= Caviar diplomacy =

Lobbying strategy of Azerbaijan

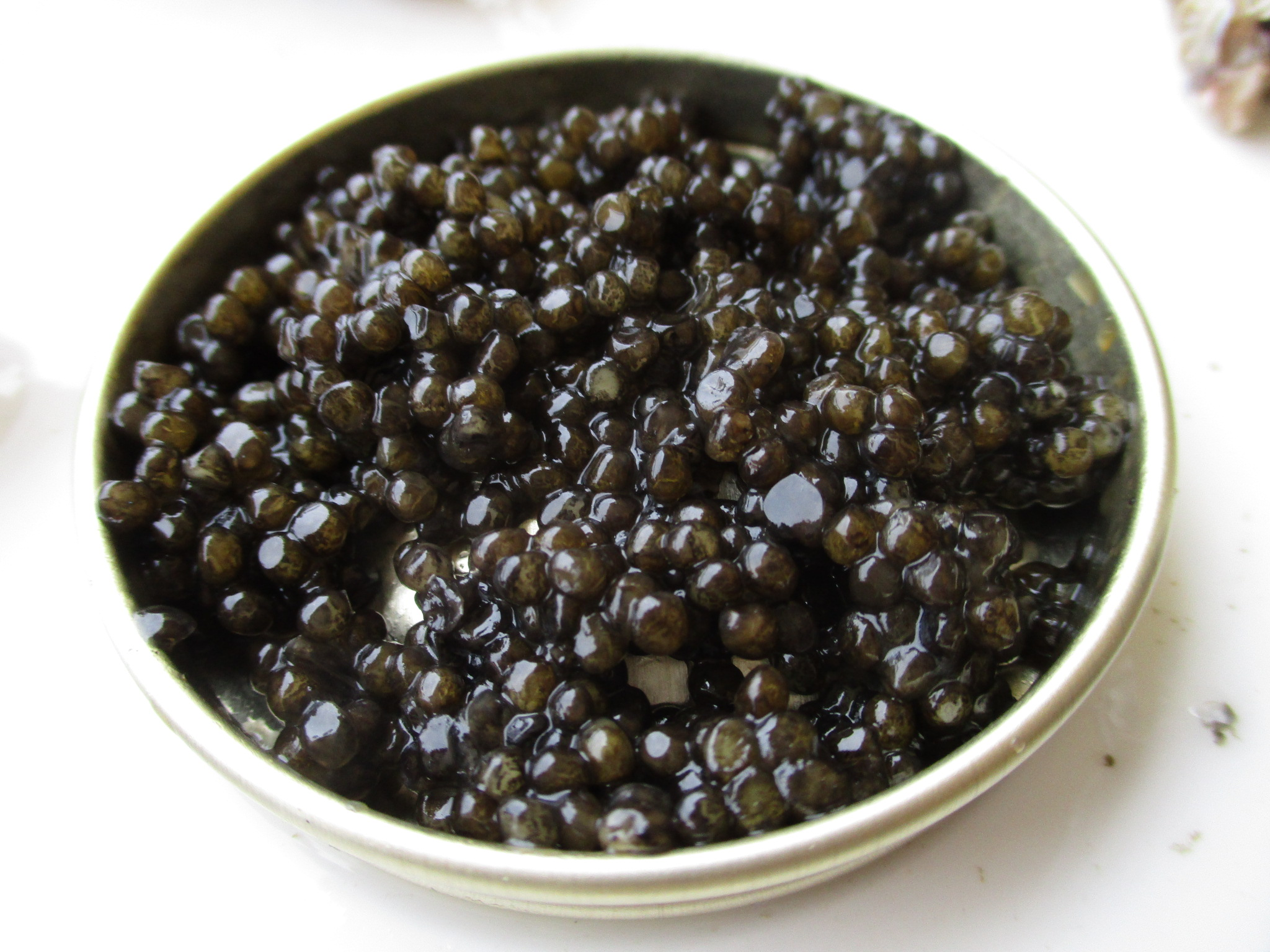
A bowl of Caviar

Caviar diplomacy is a lobbying strategy of Azerbaijan, consisting of costly invitations and bribes to foreign politicians and employees of international organizations to Azerbaijan at the expense of the host country. Caviar diplomacy also includes expensive gifts presented as "a tribute to the Eastern tradition."

== Terminology ==
The term "caviar diplomacy" was first used in 2012, in a report by the European Stability Initiative (ESI) – "Caviar Diplomacy – How Azerbaijan silenced the Council of Europe". It was noted in the report that this term is being used in informal conversations of Azerbaijani officials to describe generous gifts to foreign politicians.

== Investigation of the "European Stability Initiative" ==
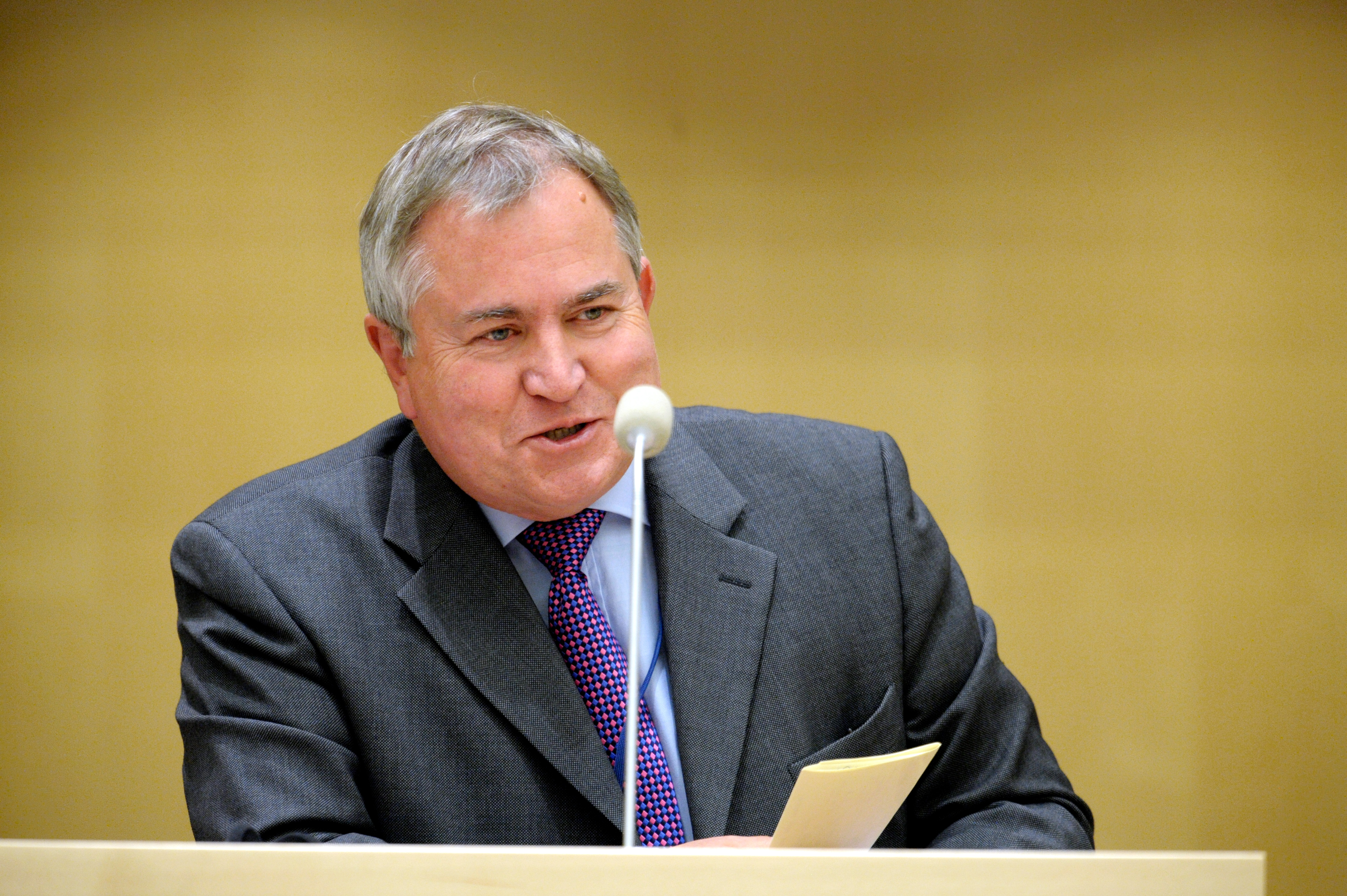
Robert Walter

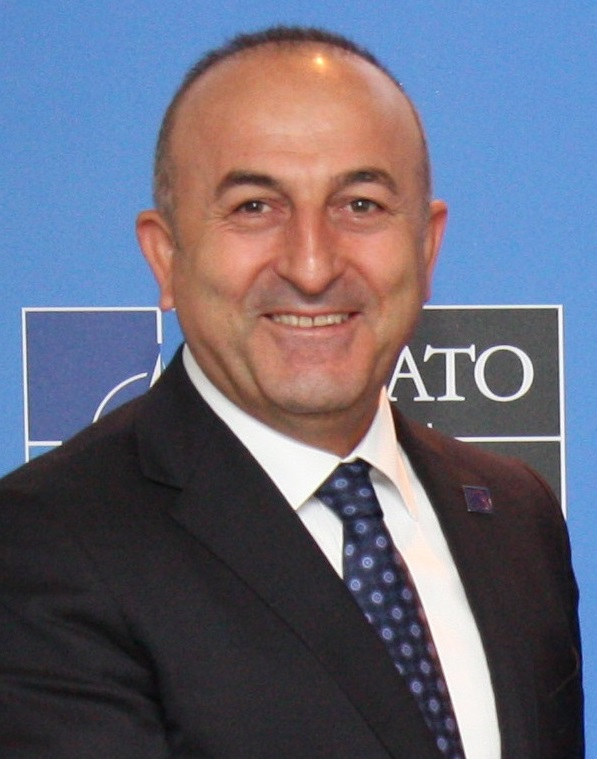
Mevlüt Çavuşoğlu

According to the sources of the European Stability Initiative, Azerbaijan has a group of 10-12 friends in the Parliamentary Assembly of the Council of Europe (PACE) and 3-4 people in the secretariat who receive at least half a kilogram of black caviar (the price on the market is more than 1300 euros per kilogram) as a gift four times a year. Many deputies are invited to Baku and during their visits receive, alongside the caviar, numerous other gifts including: expensive silk carpets, gold and silver items, drinks, and money. In Baku, a common gift is 2 kg of caviar. According to the ESI, outside of PACE, there is no doubt about the state of democracy in Azerbaijan, which is characterized as semi-authoritarian even by its biggest supporters. Nevertheless, despite the fact that there were no opposition parties elected to the Azerbaijani parliament in 2010, the head of the PACE mission stated that the elections corresponded to international standards. According to the ESI, this can be explained only by "caviar diplomacy". The ESI cited an example of PACE discussions in its report, when Azerbaijan was publicly supported by its frequent visitors – British Liberal Democrat Michael Hancock and former Foreign Minister of Estonia Kristiina Ojuland, who, despite the obvious regression in human rights situation in Azerbaijan, the lack of free elections, as well as criticism from international human rights organizations, stated that there are no serious problems in Azerbaijan. The ESI also added to the list of "friends of Azerbaijan" the Belgian Paul Wille, Eduard Lintner from Bavaria, Mevlüt Çavuşoğlu from Turkey, Robert Walter from Britain, and a number of Russian representatives.

During the 2008 presidential elections, PACE observers included a large group of frankly pro-Azerbaijani MPs. The variant of the statement on elections, prepared by the head of the group of observers Andres Herkel, containing critical remarks, faced the rejection of the pro-Azerbaijani group consisting of Michael Hancock, Eduard Lintner and Paul Ville. Herkel was forced to declare his resignation if criticism did not go into the statement. During the referendum, which lifted the limits on the number of presidential terms for Ilham Aliyev, four PACE deputies – Eduard Lintner, Paul Wille, Khaki Keskin and Pedro Agramunt evaluated the referendum as the progress of democracy.

In addition to PACE representatives, observers from the Office for Democratic Institutions and Human Rights of the OSCE (ODIHR) who have extensive experience of such observations, which revealed numerous violations of the procedure, which exclude the possibility of choice, were also present at the 2010 parliamentary elections. During the meetings of European observers, attended by PACE representatives in the person of Paul Ville and Pole Tadeusz Iwinski, the head of ODIHR observers, Audrey Glover from Great Britain, noted numerous violations that were not contested by PACE representatives. Nevertheless, the preliminary result of PACE monitoring, presented by Paul Ville, noted the compliance of preparations for elections with international standards, as well as transparent and effective work of the organizers. During the election, ODIHR observers recorded multiple violations and unprecedented ballot stuffing. By the closing of polling stations, the elections were assessed by the ODIHR as probably the most fraudulent they monitored. However, speaking on Azerbaijani television, Paul Wille stated that the elections were democratic and that he did not know about any violations. The ODIHR, in turn, subjected the elections to sharp criticism.

When asked if bribes were given to observers, Glover replied that she had not personally received one. After returning from Baku, a representative of the PACE group Wolfgang Grosruck from Germany accused Audrey Glover of being "unreliable", unprofessional, and also of not speaking out in defence of the PACE representatives when questions about bribes were asked. The ODIHR report published in January 2011 contained extremely critical assessments of the 2010 elections.

Investigations of the ESI have received resonance in Russian and international media: EU Observer, Politiken, DR, Radio Sarajevo, BBC, Der Tagesspiegel, Africa Intelligence, Neue Zürcher Zeitung, The Guardian and others.

== 2013 presidential elections ==
On October 9, 2013, Ilham Aliyev was elected Azerbaijan's president for the third time. Observers from the OSCE / ODIHR, led by Italian politician Tana de Zulueta, spoke of restrictions on freedom of speech during elections, while representatives of the European Parliament headed by Pino Arlacchi confirmed free and fair elections. The European Parliament and PACE issued a joint statement in which they highly appraised the elections. A group of observers from the US House of Representatives also acknowledged fair elections.

Varying estimates of the elections led to a scandal. On October 11, the representative of the European Union, Catherine Ashton and European Commissioner Stefan Fule, ignored the assessment of the European Parliament, including in its statement the results of the ODIHR. The Commission on Foreign Relations of the EU discussed the report of Arlacchi. During the discussion, representatives of the "green" condemned the report and said that it discredited the European Parliament. The head of the Socialists' faction in the EU said that the PACE report cannot be considered reliable at all. It later emerged that a number of EU representatives traveled to Azerbaijan unofficially and on the dime of Azerbaijani organizations, which was regarded by European Voice as "stupidity or corruption", these trips were labeled "electoral tourism".

The US State Department in its turn discredited the observers from the House of Representatives, describing the elections as not meeting international standards, and expressing solidarity with the ODIHR's assessment.

== Turning point ==
In 2015, during the discussion of the resolution on political prisoners in the European Parliament, the text written by the pro-Azerbaijani rapporteurs initially contained almost no criticism, but as a result, a resolution was adopted calling for Azerbaijan to stop repression of human rights defenders, revising the law on non-governmental organizations, not putting pressure on journalists and there was also a threat of sanctions. According to the German deputy Frank Schwabe, this was a turning point for Azerbaijan's "caviar diplomacy".

On September 10, 2015, the European Parliament adopted a resolution in which Azerbaijan was condemned for "unprecedented repression". The resolution also called on the European authorities to conduct a thorough investigation of allegations of corruption against President Aliyev and his family members, and to consider imposing targeted sanctions against officials related to the persecution.

== Investigation of the Italian prosecutor's office and in PACE ==
In June 2016, the Milan prosecutor's office brought charges of corruption and money laundering to Luca Volontè, the former head of the European People's Party faction in the Parliamentary Assembly of the Council of Europe. According to the Prosecutor's Office Volonte received €2.39 million for the support of Azerbaijani officials. Volonte's lawyers called these accusations absolutely groundless. According to the second ESI report – "Caviar Diplomacy. Part 2", published in December 2016, Volonte agreed to cooperate with the investigation and named many European politicians who have been lobbying for the interests of the Azerbaijani authorities. During the interrogations Volonte confirmed receiving €2.39 million for lobbying in favor of Azerbaijan. According to the ESI, the money went to bribing Italian and other politicians who voted against PACE resolutions and reports condemning human rights violations in Azerbaijan. In the documentary film shown on Italian television, Volonte also confirmed the receipt of €2.39 million, arguing that this money was transferred from a member of the Azerbaijani delegation to PACE Elkhan Suleymanov for consultations on agriculture. Payments to Volonte went through four British companies, which, according to The Guardian, did not conduct any operations in Britain and probably are front companies. Part of the money went through Volontè's Novae Terrae Foundation to lobbies Iona Institute, CitizenGO (he was a member of its board), the ECI Mum, Dad & Kids initiative against equal marriage and Dignitatis Humanae Institute.

The Milan prosecutor's office accused Volonte of two episodes: money laundering and accepting bribes. The court of Milan, having considered the second charge, recognized Volonte's immunity for this episode, as according to the Italian constitution, a deputy cannot be prosecuted for his professional activities. Later, the Supreme Court of Italy reversed this decision and returned the case to the Milan Court, citing the fact that the article of the Constitution is not about using his or her position for personal enrichment purposes.

Ex-ambassador of Azerbaijan to the European Union Arif Mammadov told The Guardian that he spent about 30 million euros for the services of lobbyists as representative of the Azerbaijani delegation to the Council of Europe: "All members of the Azerbaijani delegation knew about this figure, although it never appeared anywhere. It was said, that the money is intended for bribing members of other delegations and the PACE as a whole." A number of PACE deputies said that they knew about proposals to bribe the European deputies.

Elkhan Suleymanov, the representative of Azerbaijan in PACE, was called the "curator" of Volonte and other European deputies. The European press cites examples of how Volonte recalled his requests to the PACE, informing Suleymanov that "your every word is an order for me". Through the company, from which Volonte received his payments, in total of about one billion euros were conducted. Attempts by Armenian MEPs to raise the issue of corruption in PACE came up against the opposition of PACE President Pedro Agramunt, another subject of investigation of the "caviar diplomacy", who deprived them of their voice and prevented the investigation. Der Tagesspiegel qualifies this investigation as "the biggest scandal in the history of Europe". After the publication in the media, Thorbjorn Jagland, Secretary General of the Council of Europe, called on Agramut to personally provide an independent external investigative body without any further delay. Agramunt and the leaders of the five political groups rejected the proposals of the CoE official Wojciech Sawicki, which sets out the conditions for an independent investigation. However, after the visit of Agramunt to Syria, the PACE Bureau expressed to him a vote of no confidence and in fact removed Agramunt from real power, after which in April 2017 the Parliamentary Assembly formed a commission to investigate alleged corruption accusations. Its report was published in April 2018. In the course of several follow-up hearings to the report of the Assembly's Investigation Body (on 25 April 2018, 15 May 2018 and 27 June 2018) 4 PACE members were deprived of certain rights and 14 members, accused of accepting gifts and bribes from the government of Azerbaijan in 2013, were expelled from the Assembly's premises for life.

After 4 different court hearings held between 2018 and 2019, in January 2021, Criminal Section X of the Court of Milan sentenced Luca Volontè to four years in prison for taking bribes from Azerbaijani politicians.

== Investigations in Germany ==
In March 2021 several Bundestag members and ex-members of the ruling Union coalition became subjects of criminal investigations on the initial suspicion of corruption, for receiving payments from the Azerbaijani laundromat money laundering scheme, while others were implicated in allegations of corrupt lobbying practices, which led to intense criticism from members of all parties in the Bundestag and became known as the "Azerbaijan affair" (German: Aserbaidschan-Affäre) in Germany.

In March 2019, Karin Strenz, a German parliament member from the ruling CDU party, was fined for failing to notify the Bundestag of additional earnings from Azerbaijan. Earlier, she had been included in the list of "Caviar diplomacy" lobbyists. On January 30, 2021, the Bundestag stripped Karin Strentz of parliamentary immunity, as she was accused of receiving bribes in the amount of at least 22 thousand euros to lobby for Azerbaijan's interests in the Parliamentary Assembly of the Council of Europe (PACE). The case involves also the ex-member of Bundestag from CSU Eduard Lintner, a former parliamentary secretary of state under the Minister of the Interior. According to the prosecutor's office, Lintner received about 4 million euros from Azerbaijan in the period from 2008 to 2016 and transferred a significant part of the money to individual PACE members, who were supposed to speak positively about the elections in Azerbaijan and oppose demands for the release of political prisoners in Azerbaijan.

On March 4, 2021, the German Bundestag deprived Axel Fischer of parliamentary immunity, who is being investigated by the BKA for receiving money from Azerbaijan to lobby its interests in the Council of Europe.

Vice reported on the involvement of CDU MPs Axel Fischer, Mark Hauptmann, Thomas Bareiß and Olav Gutting in the "Azerbaijan affair". The article also reported on TV Berlin, a local Berlin channel that broadcasts "regime-friendly interviews" for Azerbaijan. Other Union politicians who came under fire for their connections and support of Azerbaijan are Nikolas Löbel, Tobias Zech and Joachim Pfeiffer.

On January 29, 2024 German prosecutors brought bribery and corruption charges against Axel Fischer and Eduard Lintner.

== Investigation in Malta ==
In April 2017, the Maltese press published documents according to which the top politicians of Malta and the wife of Prime Minister Joseph Muscat received millions of dollars from a bank controlled by Ilham Aliyev's daughter Leila. According to the editorial investigation, Joseph Muscat made a trip to Baku in 2015, after which he called on Europe to give an objective assessment of the positive processes in Azerbaijan.

== Paid group trips for foreign journalists after the 2020 Nagorno-Karabakh War ==
In the aftermath of the 2020 Nagorno-Karabakh war, the Azerbaijani government started arranging paid group trips for foreign journalists with the aim to disseminate Azerbaijan's narrative about the Nagorno-Karabakh conflict and the recent war. Swedish journalist Rasmus Canbäck, who was offered such a trip but declined, has written a series of articles about these trips. His investigations are foremost about his colleagues in Sweden, but according to Canbäck similar trips have been arranged from several other countries, including Italy, France, Germany, Mexico and Peru. The trips, often all-inclusive with paid air tickets, VIP treatment, accommodations at luxury hotels etc., were usually arranged by an intermediator such as the Baku Press Club or the Azerbaijani Association active in the respective country. A conspicuous detail about many of the journalists who were invited to visit the Azerbaijani controlled parts of Nagorno-Karabakh was that they had no or very limited prior knowledge about the conflict.

Based on his investigations and interviews with some of the Swedish journalists who participated in the trips, Canbäck writes that "the purpose of these trips is to spread an Azerbaijani view of the conflict in Nagorno-Karabakh and that the opportunity to ask critical questions or control who and where to meet people has been extremely limited." Journalists who asked critical questions received "brusque answers", calling such questions as "typical Armenian" and "Armenian propaganda". One of the interviewed journalists, mentioned that "It was not even possible to refer to Amnesty or Human Rights Watch, because they were allegedly bought by Armenia and then the discussion was over." Canbäck's investigations resulted in criticism from media and journalist organizations, questioning the judgement of the participants and their journalistic ethics, resulting in reprimands for some of the participants who either resigned from their positions or were suspended from any reporting which would involve issues concerning the Caucasus.

== Paid trips for EU parliamentarians ==
In 2023 the Swedish-German investigative platform Blankspot published several investigative reports about freewheeling trips made by several European Parliament members to Azerbaijan. The first report revealed that 2 MEPs, Engin Eroglu from Germany and Franc Bogovic from Slovenia, who had previously voiced harsh criticism of Azerbaijan and its government, changed their stance and started praising it after participating in a partially paid trip to Azerbaijan without declaring it in accordance with transparency rules of the EU parliament. Following this one of the members of the RUMRA-group (Bogovič is the co-chairman of the group) - German MEP Niklas Nienaß resigned, stating that "Trust and transparency are the basis of integrity, both have been broken." He subsequently said that he would "put this trip in the same basket as Qatargate" and emphasised that "MEPs should pay for their own foreign trips to avoid suspicion of undue influence".

Later a report uncovered another paid trip Polish MEP Tomasz Poręba had made to Azerbaijan after which, he also started voicing pro-Azerbaijani views. When asked why he had failed to declare the trip his lawyer said that he was freelancing in Azerbaijan. Latvian MEP Andris Ameriks similarly went to Azerbaijan and sang its praises, but the EU Parliament committee he claimed to represent had no idea he was there.

Several publications have emphasised how these trips raise questions on the reliability of EU Parliament ethics codes and the importance to enforce them.

== United States officials ==
=== Henry Cuellar ===
In May 2024, United States Congressman Enrique Roberto "Henry" Cuellar was indicted on charges related to bribery, foreign influence, and money laundering. Cuellar and his wife Imelda allegedly accepted approximately $600,000 in bribes from two foreign entities: Azerbaijan's state-owned oil company (SOCAR) and a Mexican bank. In exchange for the bribes, Cuellar allegedly used his office to influence US foreign policy in favor of Azerbaijan and to advise on legislative activity benefiting the Mexican bank. Cuellar faces up to 20 years imprisonment on each count if convicted on charges including conspiracy to commit bribery, bribery of a federal official, money laundering, and violating the Foreign Agents Registration Act (FARA). The investigation was led by the FBI and the Department of State Office of Inspector General, with assistance from the Justice Department's Criminal Division.

=== Eric Adams ===
In September 2024, New York City mayor Eric Adams was indicted on charges of bribery, fraud, and soliciting illegal foreign campaign donations from Turkey. The indictment alleges that Adams accepted free travel, luxury hotel rooms, and campaign contributions from Turkish businessmen in exchange for using his position as mayor to pressure the New York City Fire Department to fast-track approval of a new 36-story Turkish consulate building.

According to an investigation by Politico, Edward Mermelstein visited Azerbaijan with another Eric Adams official, Rana Abbasova, on an economic development trip in May 2023. The visit was paid for by the Azerbaijani government, which also covered some expenses for Mayor's Office of International Affairs Commissioner. According to Politico, this trip was part of a pattern of foreign governments and organizations paying for trips taken by Adams' officials. According to an Adams spokesperson, the primary purpose of the visit was to foster economic development and share best practices between communities. Mermelstein reported four other payments for city-related travel in 2023, including a trip to Dubai and a global summit in Seoul. Adams visited the country at least twice, and an Azerbaijani cultural group hosted a fundraiser for his 2021 campaign. City Hall said that Mermelstein took similar trips paid for by city government that would not have to be reported.

== See also ==
- Azerbaijani laundromat
- Foreign relations of Azerbaijan
- Panda diplomacy
- Ping-pong diplomacy
- Qatar corruption scandal
