= Arif Mammadov (ambassador) =

Azerbaijani diplomat (born 1964)

- Arif Məmmədov
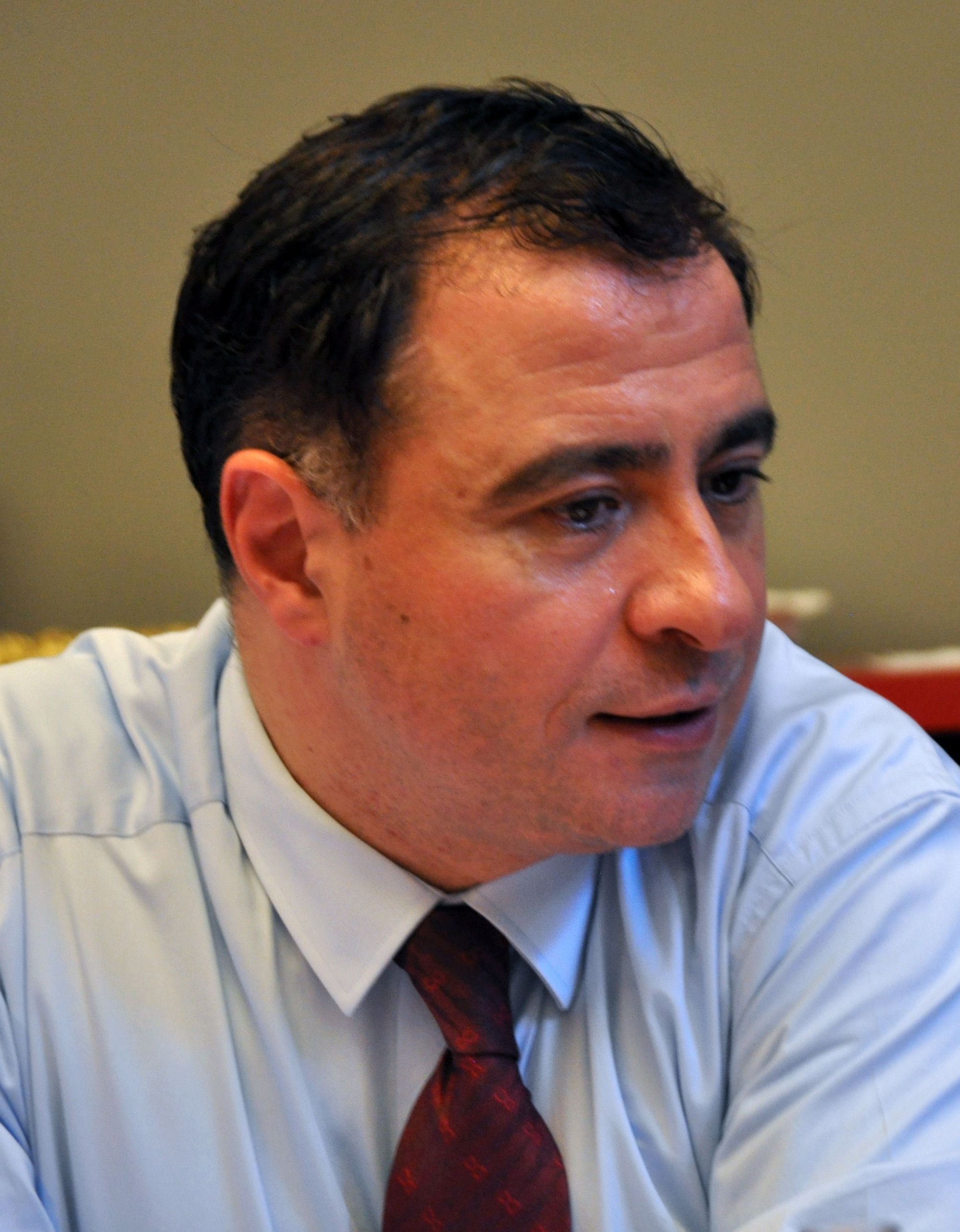

Head of the Permanent Observer Mission of the Organization of Islamic Cooperation to the European Union
- In office 25 June 2013 – November 2015
- Preceded by: Position established
- Succeeded by: Agshin Mehdiyev

Personal details
- Born: 22 September 1964 (age 62) Azerbaijan SSR
- Spouse: Jamila Mammadova
- Children: son Jamal Mammadov and daughter Selin Mammadova
- Education: Center for Political and Diplomatic Studies, London, United Kingdom Clingendael, Netherlands Institute of International Relations, Hague, Netherlands Military Institute in Moscow (VKIMO), Russia

Arif Mammadov (Azerbaijani: Arif Məmmədov; born 22 September 1964) is an Azerbaijani former diplomat and opposition activist.

== Career ==
From March 1991 until June 1992, Mammadov served as a Senior Adviser at the Department of International Affairs at the City Council of Baku, Azerbaijan. In 1993 he joined the Department of State Protocol of the Ministry of Foreign Affairs of the Republic of Azerbaijan. From 1994 to 1995, he was the 2nd Secretary at the Department of Europe, USA, and Canada. In 1995, Arif Mammadov was appointed as the 2nd Secretary to the Ambassador of the Republic of Azerbaijan to the Kingdom of Belgium. In 1998, he became the 1st Secretary and from 1999 to 2000 he held the position of the Counselor.

From 2000 until 2006, Mammadov was the Head of the Brussels-based Permanent Representation of the Republic of Azerbaijan to the European Union. At the same time, he was the Ambassador of Azerbaijan to the Kingdom of Belgium, Kingdom of Netherlands and Grand-Duchy of Luxembourg from 2004 to 2006. From January 2007 to September 2012, Mammadov was the Head of the Permanent Representation of the Republic of Azerbaijan to the Council of Europe (CoE) in Strasbourg, France. During this appointment, he chaired a number of high level conferences organized by the CoE and its member states. In 2008-2010 he was a Thematic Coordinator on Information Policy of the CoE. He also was a Chair of the Rapporteur Group on Education, Culture, Sport, Youth, and Environment of the Committee of Ministers of the CoE and from 2010 to 2012 a Member of the Governing Board of European Wergeland Center. In 2011-2012, he was a co-chair of the CoE Exchange on Religious Dimension of Intercultural Dialogue. From 2012 to 2013 he joined again the Ministry of Foreign Affairs of the Republic of Azerbaijan as the Head of the Department of Human Rights and Democracy.

Since June 2013, he headed (as their first EU Ambassador) the Mission to the EU of the Jeddah-based Organization of Islamic Cooperation (OIC). As of 2019, he directed his efforts, first of all, to establishing strong political and economic relations with the European Union and cooperating in the field of human rights, humanitarian aid, inter-cultural and inter-religious dialogue, combating terrorism and islamophobia.

In March 2015 Mammadov published a post about a fire in Baku which killed 15 people, "There is no nation that would stand that shame and injustice," he wrote on his Facebook page "Officials earn millions on our people's sufferings, and if they do not fear our people's anger, they must fear God's wrath!". In response, the pro-government website Haqqin.az called Mammadov a "traitor" and suggested that Mammadov, along with a number of Azerbaijani diplomats who "liked" his Facebook post were involved in a conspiracy. Shortly after, the General Secretariat of the OIC recalled Mamedov from the post of OIC Permanent Representative to the EU. Five other diplomats who liked Mamedov's post were also fired from the Azerbaijani Foreign Ministry.

In August 2015 the National Central Bureau of Interpol in the Republic of Azerbaijan issued an international warrant for Mammadov's arrest on corruption charges.

In 2017, Mammadov gave an interview to The Guardian about corruption among members of the Azerbaijani delegation to the Council of Europe. According to Mammadov, they spent over 30 million euros on lobbying in the Council of Europe institutions, including the Parliamentary Assembly of the Council of Europe (PACE). In 2018, Mammadov became a key witness in the investigation of allegations of corruption in PACE in the aftermath of the "Caviar Diplomacy" report by the European Stability Initiative. He was also present at the trial of the Italian MP Luca Volontè [it; fr], in the Italian court. According to Mammadov, Volonte's lawyers were financed by Azerbaijan.

In May 2020, Mammadov became a co-founder of the Azerbaijani civil platform "BIZ" he is also the co-chair of the AND (Democracy for Azerbaijan movement).

== Other ==
From 2008 to 2012, Mammadov was a member of the Governing Board of the Oslo-based European Wergeland Centre, a European resource centre on education for intercultural understanding, human rights and democratic citizenship. He advocates for active youth involvement in international affairs, thus initiating a number of projects for youth.

== Personal life ==
Besides politics, he is interested in sports and music. Along with his native Azerbaijani language, Arif Mammadov is also fluent in Turkish, English, Russian, French and Amharic/Ethiopian.
