= Novae Terrae Foundation =

Organization engaged in money laundering

The Novae Terrae Foundation (Fondazione Novae Terrae) was a far-right organization active between 2012 and 2021 which financed campaigns against abortion, LGBT rights, and "gender ideology," particularly in partnership with right-wing religious groups across Europe.

It was formed in 2005 in Saronno by Luca Volontè but remained inactive until 2012. In 2012, it began to serve as part of the so-called 'Azerbaijani laundromat' and channeled €2.39 million from Russian-Azerbaijani sources into campaigns, primarily organized by right-wing religious organizations, against abortion, divorce, alleged "gender ideology", and LGBT rights including same-sex marriage, adoption, and surrogacy.

In 2015, the Foundation's headquarters were searched as part of an investigation into Volontè for money laundering. In January 2021, Volontè was initially sentenced to four years in prison for accepting bribes from Azerbaijani officials to use his position as a member of the Parliamentary Assembly of the Council of Europe (PACE) to mute criticism of Azerbaijan's human rights abuses. Of the 2.39 million euros received, only three payments totaling 500 thousand euros were recognized by the court as bribes. Volontè was eventually acquitted of all charges in 2022.

== Financing and investigation ==
Various researchers were commissioned by European parliamentarians to research the Azerbaijani laundromat. The researchers drew connections between nationalist campaigns and their connections to anti-LGBT, anti-abortion, and anti-divorce lobbyists; all investigations found Novae Terrae to play a large role.

In February 2015 the Foundation was searched by the Milan Prosecutor's Office as part of an investigation of Volontè for tax offenses. Prosecutors found that money flowed from tax havens into Volontè's accounts, including Novae Terrae, which received €1.89 million in 18 payments of €105 thousand each between July 2013 and December 2014 from two front Scottish companies, who they believe Elkhan Suleymanov was behind. Other payments were made to a front company solely owned by Volontè's wife. In total, he received 2.39 million euros through Novae Terrae from Azerbaijan officials so that Volontè would, while serving on the Council of Europe, bury a report by Christoph Strässer, a German deputy, on torture and inhumane treatment in Azerbaijani prisons. In January 2021, Volontè was sentenced to four years of imprisonment for international corruption, together with the Azerbaijani defendants Elkhan Suleymanov and Muslum Mammadov. The Court of Milan recognized three bribes for a total sum of five hundred thousand euros as part of the offense and acquitted the defendants for the rest of the sum.

Between 2015 and 2017, Novae Terrae continued to distribute over 560 thousand euros collected by monetizing bank bonds previously bought with Russian-Azerbaijani money, though no new money was coming in. After the investigations, Novae Terrae began to receive financing through Catholic prelates and entrepreneurs. In the months of the investigation, he received 20 thousand euros from the Spaniards of CitizenGo, the same amount from Hungary, 5 thousand from the Vatican Secretariat of State, and 5.7 thousand from Antonio Brandi, president of ProVita, a far-right Catholic association. They also received funds from the National organization for marriage. Patrick Dominit Slim sent 66 thousand euros divided into four wire transfers and Christoph Schönborn contributed 15 thousand euros to Novae Terrae to fund research to create the "Global Index of Human Dignity".

== Members ==
From 2016 to 2019, Volontè was the chairman of the Dignitatis Humanae Institute and he has also served on the board of CitizenGo, a petition platform set up by the far-right group Hazte Oír. Matteo Cattaneo was coordinator of Novae Terrae in 2013, and also the head of fundraising for Hazte Oír and for CitizenGo.

In 2015, Volontè left the presidency to Emanuele Fusi. Massimiliano Codoro, who'd been on the board for 10 years, left the organization and was replaced with Simone Pillon, who renounced the chair after the first investigative article by L'Espresso. In 2019, the Foundation registered a new statute which named as founding members Fusi, Volontè, Gianfranco Amato (founder of Nova Civilitas and a leader of The People of the Family, an Italian political party), Flavio Felice, Giuseppe Zola, and Nicola Abalsamo.

== Activities ==
Novae Terrae redistributed funds it received to right-wing fundamentalist lobbyists in Italy, Spain, Great Britain, the United States, Poland, and Hungary.

In November 2012, Volontè persuaded Monsignor Rino Fisichella to host an exhibition from the Aliyev Foundation, headed by the Azerbaijani President Ilham Aliyev, inside the Vatican. Later, the Monsignor's secretary sent Volontè a bank account number for Institute for the Works of Religion, the Vatican bank, which Novae Terrae paid 20 thousand euros to in January 2013.

In 2014, Novae Terrae began to work more globally due to the influx of offshore money. They recruited lobbyists in Brussels, reimbursing travel and entertainment expenses. They also gave 8 thousand euros to Franciso Javier Borrego, a Spanish magistrate and former judge of the European Court of Human Rights. In January, Novae Terrae transferred 12 thousand euros to Benjamin Harnwell, a British ultra-conservative politician who founded the Dignitatis Humanae Institute, a Catholic organization whose most famous member is Steve Bannon. L'espresso notes that a few months after the transfer, Dignitatis organized a conference in the Vatican. In February, Novae Terrae donated 12 thousand euros to CitizenGo, pledging the same amount annually, renewable year to year, as well as 2 thousand to a Madrid communications company specializing in anti-abortion campaigns. In addition, they paid 33 thousand euros to two fundraising managers for CitizenGo. Later in 2014, Novae Terrae donated 25 thousand euros to the Iona Institute, a socially conservative organisation that advocates the advancement and promotion of the Christian religion and what it sees as the religion's social and moral values, based in Dublin.

The same year, Novae Terrae created a pledge which called for an EU plan for families that would only recognize heterosexual marriage. Notable signatories include Antonio Tajani, who has opposed LGBT rights for decades and was elected president of the European Parliament shortly after, and the German Association for a Christian Culture (DVCK), which campaigns against LGBT rights.

Novae Terrae was an integral player in Agenda Europe, until Volantè was investigated. They also funded the European Citizen’s Initiative Mum, Dad & Kids against equal marriage. Pink News identified the Center for Bioethics and Culture (CBC) and Alliance Defending Freedom (ADF) as part of a network set up by Novae Terrae, then issued a correction as the CBC had been included in the network without their prior approval or knowledge and were subsequently removed.

In 2016, Novae Terrae gave 24 thousand euros to the Catholic University of Milan for the creation of the "Human Dignity Index", a modification of the Universal Humans Rights Index that defines "dignity" as the "universal right to be born" as part of a larger campaign to strategically reframe opposition to abortion rights as promotion of human rights.

=== World Congress of Families ===
Novae Terrae occupies a top position in the World Congress of Families. In 2014, the World Congress of Families was to be held in Russia, and Volontè was supposed to attend. The event was canceled due to sanctions on Russia following the invasion of Crimea. A parallel and unofficial congress was organized titled "Large Families - The Future of Humanity". Luca Volontè was photographed at the 2015 World Congress of Families in Salt Lake City, United States. The photograph appears on the homepage of Novae Terrae. In 2016, Volontè, speaking for Novae Terrae at the World Congress of Families, argued against same-sex marriage. In 2019, Novae Terrae, ProVita, and Generazione Famiglia invited the World Congress of Families to Verona. Novae Terrae had financed nearly all the organizations present: the Sutherland Institute, CitizenGo, former organizer of Family Day Gianfranco Amato, Don Fortunato di Noto, and the European Federation of Large Family Organizations.
