= Poverty in Azerbaijan =

As per the Asian Development Bank's estimates of 2017, 5.5% of the population of Azerbaijan lives below the poverty line in 2022. Experts estimate that the real figure is much higher. The 2017 Asian Development Bank report also estimated that for every 1000 babies born in Azerbaijan, 18 die before their 15th birthday.

While the government of Azerbaijan has become immensely wealthy over the past two decades due to an oil boom, it is unclear to what extent this has affected living standards, with poverty, corruption, and repression continuing to affect the country. Rovshan Aghayev, one of Azerbaijan's leading economists, states that the Azerbaijani government's claim of drastically reducing poverty is unsubstantiated, as the state fails to provide the transparent statistical data necessary to measure real income inequality and living standards.

Khadjia Ismayilova, an Azerbaijani investigative journalist and member of the Organized Crime and Corruption Reporting Project, states that "Azerbaijanis understand quite well that the wealth of oligarchs we expose has been built at the expense of their empty fridges and the time will come when the anger of poverty will explode." The revenue from the petroleum resources of Azerbaijan benefits the capital of Baku, while the rest of the country remains underdeveloped.
