= Breda O'Brien =

Irish newspaper columnist and Catholic conservative pundit

- Education: Mater Dei Institute of Education
- Occupations: Journalist, teacher

Breda O'Brien (born 1962) is an Irish teacher and columnist, writing a weekly column for The Irish Times. O'Brien is a frequent spokesperson for Catholic-based views on political issues such as opposition to abortion and same-sex marriage. She founded the Irish chapter of Feminists for Life in 1992.

== Early life and education ==
Born in Dungarvan, County Waterford, O'Brien was educated at the Convent of Mercy, Dungarvan and later at the Mater Dei Institute of Education, Dublin, qualifying as a teacher.

== Career ==
O'Brien taught English and Religion, at Muckross Park College, a public Catholic girls' school, between 1983 and 1987. She later returned to this post in 1992, and has remained there since. She has worked as a video producer and communications trainer in the Catholic Communications Centre (founded by the Irish Catholic Bishops' Conference), Booterstown, Dublin from 1988 to 1991. She worked as a researcher for RTÉ from 1991 to 1992. Her career as a columnist began with The Sunday Business Post from 1997 to 2000 and continued with The Irish Times.

O'Brien is a patron of the Iona Institute, a conservative Catholic pressure group, and appears regularly in the Irish media as a contributor, supporting the teachings of the Catholic Church.

In her Irish Times column, she has expressed her opposition to abortion in all circumstances, including rape, incest and fatal foetal abnormality, and to same-sex marriage.

Her stance on civil partnerships has changed. Initially opposed to them in 2008, and 2010 by 2015, in the run up to the Irish marriage equality referendum, she claimed to be in support of them.

Marriage is already under assault in every way from heterosexuals. Do we wish to redefine it in an even more radical way? ... It is never pleasant to take a stance like this, and it must be a thousand times less pleasant to be the person who is told that important values like equality must take second place to the common good.

— Breda O'Brien,

O'Brien, along with other members of the Iona Institute took legal action against RTE and Panti Bliss for being labelled as homophobes for campaigning against marriage equality. This was the impetus for Panti's Noble Call speech.

She is married, and has four children who have been home-schooled.

== See also ==
- Patricia Casey
- David Quinn
- Maria Steen
- John Waters
- Abortion in the Republic of Ireland
- LGBT rights in the Republic of Ireland
