= Patricia Casey =

Irish psychiatrist

- Education: University College Cork
- Occupation: Psychiatrist
- Organization: Iona Institute
- Known for: Catholic campaigning, Anti-abortion campaigning, Anti-LGBT rights campaigning

Patricia Rosarie Casey is an Irish psychiatrist, academic, journalist and conservative commentator on social issues. She is Professor of Psychiatry at University College Dublin and consultant psychiatrist at the Mater Misericordiae University Hospital, Dublin. She is known for her regular column with the Irish Independent newspaper, and her conservative views on a variety of social issues.

== Background and personal life ==
Brought up in Ballynoe in County Cork, Casey's father was a council worker and farmer, while her mother worked as a public health nurse. She has one sibling; a younger sister, Terry. Excelling at school, she went on to study medicine at University College Cork, graduating in 1976 with Bachelors of Medicine and Surgery. She is married to barrister John McGuiggan. Casey notes that she and her husband are at opposite ends of the political spectrum. Casey is a practising Roman Catholic.

== Medical career ==
After graduating from medical school, Casey received specialist psychiatric and research training in Britain. Between 1977 and 1985 she held the positions of senior house officer, registrar, honorary senior registrar, and research fellow at Mapperley Hospital, Nottingham, and the Royal Edinburgh Hospital. From 1985 to 1991, she worked as a senior lecturer and consultant psychiatrist in the Department of Psychiatry at Cork University Hospital. She has been Professor of Psychiatry and director of an Acute Unit at the Mater Misericordiae University Hospital, Dublin since 1991. Casey has authored or co-authored several books and edits The Psychiatrist, a publication of the Royal College of Psychiatrists. Her clinical and research interests include depression, personality disorder and suicide prevention. From 1994 to 1999, she chaired the Irish Fitness to Practise Medical Council Committee.

== Memberships and Fellowships ==
Casey is associated with several professional organisations:

- Fellow of the Royal College of Psychiatrists
- Fellow of the Royal College of Physicians of Ireland
- Fellow of the Royal Society of Medicine
- Fellow of the Royal Academy of Medicine in Ireland
- Member of the Medico-Legal Society of Ireland

== Positions on social issues ==
Casey is a patron and co-founder of the Iona Institute, a think tank, often described as a pressure group, which promotes a Catholic point of view. Casey is known for her opposition to divorce, advising the Irish government against holding a referendum to legalise divorce in 1995. She also maintains that "the sense of loss children feel when parents separate is greater than when a parent dies". She does not, however, disagree with divorce in the case of a violent or abusive spouse. Casey also opposes abortion, surrogate pregnancy, anonymous donor in vitro fertilisation, non-traditional family units, adoption by gay parents, and same-sex marriage. She is a proponent of heterosexual adoption. Casey has testified before the Irish Government, at the British House of Commons, and in Irish legal cases on a number of these issues, in particular suicide and deliberate self-harm. She also writes a regular opinion column for the Irish Independent newspaper and in the past has contributed to the Sunday Business Post and to the letters page of the Irish Times, as well as appearing on national television and radio.

=== Newstalk interview ===
In a November 2009 interview on Newstalk's The Wide Angle programme, Casey criticised the way in which the Catholic Church dealt with child sexual abuse. She called for reform of the Church hierarchy in Ireland and for the resignation of bishops named in the Murphy Report. The Broadcasting Authority of Ireland later found the interview to have been conducted in an "unfair and non-objective manner" and described Karen Coleman's questioning of Casey as "inappropriate" and "unjustified". Newstalk broadcast an apology following the interview.

=== Archbishop Diarmuid Martin row ===
In July 2012, Casey accused the Catholic Archbishop of Dublin Diarmuid Martin of undermining the confidence of young priests by both criticising them for being "traditional" and referring to them as "fragile". In addition she criticised him for being unable to talk about the Catholic Church in an "upbeat" way, offering "no solutions" and merely analysing problems rather than solving them.

Responding on behalf of the Archbishop in August 2012, his Director of Communications accused Casey of "mispresenting" his comments, saying she had "conveniently forgotten" the Archbishop's upbeat comments at the Eucharistic Congress 2012. She also said Casey "grossly misrepresented" the Archbishop's comments on young priests being "fragile", saying "his actual comments [...] indicate the opposite".

== Misrepresentation of research ==
=== Uppsala University study ===
Swedish scientists faulted Casey for presenting their research data in order to support her position against same-sex marriage and same-sex couple adoption. Casey had made repeated reference to a parenting study from Uppsala University, Sweden, claiming that it showed that "children...do best when raised by their married biological parents". The University and the authors of the report rejected as invalid Casey's interpretation of their results. They have stated that her claim that children do better when raised by married heterosexuals is "not valid based on our findings... no comparisons were made with gay or lesbian family constellations in the studies included in the review. Therefore, there is nothing whatsoever in our review that would justify the conclusion that same-sex parents cannot raise healthy children who do well." Anna Sarkadi, the study's lead author, also commented, "I find it interesting that, since the report was published, we have been contacted by many ultra-conservative groups who are saying that it supports their point. But I think it's very important to be cautious about what conclusions you come to." Casey said that she was "just taking the results of the report to its logical conclusion."

=== UNICEF report ===
Casey has claimed that a United Nations Children's Fund (UNICEF) report supported her position on same-sex parenting. This was disputed by the then Executive Director of UNICEF Ireland, Melanie Verwoerd. Verwoerd stated that "Unicef does not make any judgments on the well being of children growing up with same-sex parents" and that Casey's claim of UNICEF support was "incorrect and unacceptable".

=== Views on counselling ===
In the Irish Examiner newspaper of 13 May 1999, Casey was quoted as saying that counselling is a waste of time for treating depression. The journalist Caroline O'Doherty wrote that Casey, an advocate of Prozac and related SSRI treatments, was speaking following the publication of a study in the British Medical Journal which asserted that counselling had no benefits for patients with depression. Casey was referring to a study on depression published in the British Medical Journal on 1 May 1999 by Ulrik Fredrik Malt, a professor of psychiatry at the University of Oslo who provided expert evidence at the trial of Anders Behring Breivik. The only counselling involved in the study was the request that GPs be supportive during the consultation. Malt's paper clearly stated that specific forms of counselling were excluded from the study.

In response to similar claims by Casey in the Sunday Business Post of 4 July 1999 ( 'Counsellor, Heal Thyself' ), Ivor Browne, Casey's predecessor as Professor of Psychiatry at University College Dublin, wrote in the Sunday Business Post on 11 July 1999 that the reference to counselling in the paper was merely incidental and that the concern of the paper was a comparison of one anti-depressant with another, continuing that;

This study did not involve any significant psychotherapy of counselling input. I can only assume that Professor Casey was pressed for time when she read this

Browne continued to note that there is a well established body of research demonstrating the effectiveness of counselling and psychotherapy and expressed his surprise that Casey was unaware of these studies.

=== Publications ===
- Casey, Patricia; Richard Byng (2011). Psychiatry in Primary Care (Cambridge Clinical Guides) (4th ed.). Cambridge University Press. ISBN 978-0-521-75982-3.
- 'Using computers in research' in 'Research methods in psychiatry'. London: Gaskell Publications. (2007)
- 'Bipolar disorder' in 'The mind: a users guide'. London: Transworld Publications. (2007)
- Fish's Clinical Psychopathology. London: Gaskell Publications. (2007)
- 'Personality disorder' in 'Psychiatry in primary care'. London: Gaskell Publications. (2007)
- Casey, Patricia; Brendan Kelly (2007). Fishes Clinical Psychopathology. Gaskelly Publications. ISBN 978-1-904671-32-9.
- Psycho-social treatment of deliberate self-harm. London, UK: Royal College of Psychiatrists CPD online. (2006)
- Casey, Patricia; Ciaran Craven (1998). Psychiatry and the Law. Oak Tree Press. ISBN 1-86076-069-4.
- Casey, Patricia (1997). A Guide to Psychiatry in Primary Care (2nd ed.). Wrightson Biomedical Publishing Ltd. ISBN 1-871816-33-5.
- Casey, Patricia (1988). "The Epidemiology of Personality Disorder". In P. Tyrer (ed.). Personality Disorder. Wright. ISBN 0-7236-1055-X.
- Casey, Patricia (November 1988). "The Epidemiology of Personality Disorder". In Tryer, Peter J (ed.). Personality Disorders: Diagnosis, Management and Course. John Wright. ISBN 0-7236-1055-X.
- Casey, Patricia (1982). "Drugs of Abuse". In Tryer, Peter J (ed.). Drugs in Psychiatric Practice. John Wright. ISBN 0-407-00212-X.

== See also ==
- Anthony Clare
- Breda O'Brien
- David Quinn (columnist)
