= Vincent Twomey =

Irish Roman Catholic priest

The Reverend Dr. Vincent Twomey SJ
- Education: CBC Cork
- Alma mater: Maynooth College; University of Regensburg
- Occupations: lecturer, priest
- Known for: Catholic campaigning

Denis Vincent Twomey SVD (born 1941) is an Irish Roman Catholic priest, Professor Emeritus of Moral Theology, and a "patron" of the Iona Institute, a Catholic pressure group.

== Life ==
Twomey grew up in Cork, where he attended Christian Brothers College. He entered the Divine Word Missionaries in 1963. After philosophical studies at Donamon, County Roscommon, and theological studies at St Patrick's College, Maynooth, he was ordained priest on 6 January 1970. After ordination, he spent a semester in Münster, Westphalia, studying under the theologian Karl Rahner, before he transferred to the University of Regensburg to do his doctoral studies under the supervision of Joseph Ratzinger. On completing the doctorate in 1979, he was sent to teach in the Regional Seminary of Papua New Guinea and the Solomon Islands for three years as Professor of Dogmatic Theology. After this, he was appointed professor at the Divine Word Missionary Theology Faculty at Mödling, near Vienna, Austria. In 1983, he was appointed lecturer in moral theology at Maynooth, and was subsequently made Professor. He was also Visiting Professor on the Theology Faculty of the University of Fribourg, Switzerland, in the Summer semester of 1983.

Since 1978, he has been a member of the Ratzinger circle of doctoral and post-doctoral students that meets once a year for a week-end seminar. In 1986, he founded The Patristic Symposium at Maynooth to promote the study of Patrology and has organised six international conferences on the subject. From 1997-2006, he was Editor of the Irish Theological Quarterly. In 2003, he became Editor-in-Chief of The Word. Since September 2006, he is Professor Emeritus of Moral Theology. He is at present a member of the Provincial Council of the Irish and British Province of the Divine Word Missionaries, as well as being an elected member of the House Council in the SVD House, Maynooth.

On 10 October 2011 he was conferred with the Pro Ecclesia et Pontifice medal by Cardinal Burke. The medal was given to Fr Twomey for outstanding services rendered to the Church and to the Pope.

== Murphy Report ==
On 2 December 2009 Twomey, speaking on the Murphy Report, said that those bishops named in the Dublin diocesan report "should resign immediately from their current pastoral positions". Twomey also said that "the longer they delay in doing so, the greater the damage they will do to all faithful Catholics, and in particular to the survivors of abuse who are still paying the price for the sins of their priests and bishop". He said, "at the very least, it would seem, all were guilty of negligence – some, such as Bishop Donal Murray of Limerick, whose behaviour was described as 'inexcusable', more than others. But all were deemed guilty of inaction, of failing to listen to their conscience, as Mary Raftery put it on radio and television." "They seem incapable of responding", he added.

Twomey said the bishops "were deemed guilty of putting the interests of the institution above the safety and welfare of children. Their failure to act when necessary, whatever the motivation, caused profound emotional damage to the victims of clerical sexual abuse and their families, and facilitated even more abuse."

Twomey said "an honest investigation of the culture of the Irish Catholic Church itself is needed. Scrutinising 'traditional Irish Catholicism' would call for a long-term commitment at local and national level. This should begin immediately." He said that "with reference to the Irish Bishops' Conference, the report quotes a bishop who suggested its modus operandi was to try to achieve a 'consensus'. Perhaps the 'lowest common denominator' would be more accurate."

He suggested that the "size and the nature of the Bishops' Conference works against effective leadership at local or national level. Each bishop fears to tread on the toes of the others, not to mention criticise them. Worse still, there is a marked general tendency in the Irish Bishops’ Conference to hide behind the episcopal bench, as I pointed out in a public debate in Maynooth".

In an interview on RTE Radio 1 following publication of the 'Cloyne Report' in July 2011, he opined that the current Minister for Justice, Alan Shatter, did not understand the "seal of the confessional" as he was not a Catholic.

On 5 January 2010 Twomey said that calls for the resignation of the Bishop of Galway, Martin Drennan, "are unfounded". Twomey also said: "If I was in any way guilty of inciting such calls, I am sincerely sorry and ask forgiveness." In a letter to The Irish Times, Twomey wrote: "Since I am on record as calling for the resignation of the bishops mentioned in the Murphy report (3 December 2009), I should have expressly excluded Dr Martin Drennan."

Twomey said that sectors of society have shown little decency or virtue over the last 20 years. Speaking about the criticism aimed at the church following the Murphy and Ryan reports, Twomey said the extent to which the church was responsible for this was a shame, but that such behaviour was a sign of our cowardice and lack of moral courage". He said moral theology was about virtue, decency, character, principle, but that "very little of that has been evident in the last 20 years, be it in banking, economics, politics or the church".

== Hibernia College Controversy ==
In March 2012, after being contacted by Atheist Ireland, Hibernia College removed material on atheism, written by Twomey, from its religion module for primary schools teachers. The material, Atheist Ireland argued, was defamatory and untrue, linking atheist humanism to both Nazism and Communism and accusing it of "producing the worst horrors history has ever witnessed, namely Nazism, fascism and Marxism, the latter alone responsible for some 100 million lives, according to The Black Book written by French ex-Marxists. Atheism is not a benign force in history." In order to pass the accompanying exam, students were required to answer "true" to questions such as "Atheist humanism produced the worst horrors history has ever witnessed".

On the "Lunchtime with Jonathan Healy" show on Newstalk radio on 7 March 2012, Twomey defended his material, claiming "It is a fact that atheism has produced the worst atrocities in history such as Nazism" and "I stand over my course, I stand over what I said".

== Partial bibliography ==
- Apostolikos Thronos: The Primacy of Rome as reflected in the Church History of Eusebius and the historico-apologetic writings of Saint Athanasius the Great (Münster, Westphalia 1981)
- Christianity and Neoplatonism: Proceedings of the First Patristic Conference, Joint Editor with Thomas Finan (Dublin: 1992)
- Scriptural Interpretation in the Fathers: Letter and Spirit: Proceedings of the Second Patristic Conference, Joint Editor with Thomas Finan (Dublin 1995)
- Studies in Patristic Christology: Proceedings of the Third Patristic Conference, Joint Editor with Thomas Finan (Dublin1998)
- The End of Irish Catholicism? (Dublin, 2003)
- Benedict XVI. The Conscience of Our Age: A theological Portrait (San Francisco: Ignatius Press, 2007)
- The Holy Trinity in the Fathers of the Church: Proceedings of the Fourth Patristic Conference, Joint Editor with Lewis Ayres (Dublin 2007).
