= David Quinn (columnist) =

Irish social and religious commentator

- Education: St Paul's College, Raheny
- Alma mater: NIHE Dublin
- Occupation: Journalist
- Organisation: Iona Institute
- Known for: Conservative campaigning

David Quinn is an Irish social and religious commentator. From 1996 to 2003, he was the editor at The Irish Catholic. He served as the religious and social affairs correspondent for the Irish Independent from 2003 to 2005. He has often appeared on Irish current affairs programmes. Since 2007, Quinn has been the Director of the Iona Institute advocacy group. Quinn has campaigned against the liberalisation of Irish abortion laws, the introduction of same-sex marriage and the legalisation of assisted suicide. He is a member of the Dublin branch of Legatus, which promotes Catholic values in corporate business, for those who meet stringent qualification criteria. He was educated at St Paul's College, Raheny and studied at NIHE Dublin (now Dublin City University), graduating with a degree in Business Studies.

He is also a regular contributor to the Irish edition of The Sunday Times.

== Activities ==
=== Iona Institute ===
In January 2007 Quinn founded the Iona Institute, a Roman Catholic advocacy group promoting the practice of religion and families based on traditional marriage. He is the current Director of the Iona Institute.

=== Abortion ===
Quinn supported Ireland's previous near total ban on abortion, and has appeared many times in media debates on the topic of abortion in Ireland, to defend the Eighth Amendment.

=== Euthanasia ===
Quinn has campaigned against the legalisation of euthanasia.

=== LGBT rights ===
Quinn has spoken in favour of Section 37 of the Employment Equality Act, which allows religious schools to discriminate, and fire employees who don't match their ethos, which can be used to fire gay teachers in Catholic schools, with the Iona Institute recommending that it be kept. He is opposed to Ireland's Gender Recognition Act for transgender people. In 2010, he was opposed to legal recognition of same-sex in the form of civil partnerships. He campaigned unsuccessfully for a No vote in the 2015 same-sex marriage referendum.

In the course of the referendum campaign, Professor John A. Murphy, an Irish historian and former member of Seanad Éireann, wrote to The Irish Times. In his letter, he described the constitutional amendment, which permitted same-sex marriage and extended constitutional protection to families based on such marriages, as "grotesque nonsense.". Following this, Mr Quinn tweeted "Proposed change to marriage "grotesque nonsense"... Great letter by Prof John A Murphy in @IrishTimes today #MarRef". Mr Quinn was criticised for this Tweet by drag queen and gay rights activist Rory O'Neill (also known by his stage name, Panti Bliss), who wrote: "I can think of lots of things that are grotesque. Extending constitutional protection to all families is not one of them... I would call it 'fair', 'reasonable', 'compassionate', 'considerate', 'respectful', or even 'the very least we can do'. But not 'grotesque'."

=== Climate change denial ===
Quinn is highly outspoken in his denial of both the severity of climate change and the role that humans have played in perpetuating the Climate crisis.

Many of his objections to climate action - from carbon taxes to cutting emissions - focus solely on the economic impact that such actions would have. This is despite overwhelming evidence that climate action will ultimately create jobs and cost less than not taking action.

In 2014 he made claims that the Irish Government would need to permit fracking in Ireland to address the growing demand for energy, while also sharing his opinion that the 2007 IPCC report was inaccurate. The Houses of the Oireachtas subsequently published a report into the harmful effects on environment and humans that fracking could have in Ireland, which led to a law being passed in 2017 banning the practice of fracking in Ireland.

In 2019, Quinn was noted for his outspoken comments targeting climate activist Greta Thunberg, using his appearances on radio stations and his social media channels to attack the youth climate movement.

== See also ==
- LGBT rights in the Republic of Ireland
- Abortion in the Republic of Ireland
- Patricia Casey
- Breda O'Brien
- Maria Steen
- Cora Sherlock
- Iona Institute
