= Dignitatis Humanae Institute =

Christian think tank (2008–2021)

The Dignitatis Humanae Institute (DHI; also known as the Institute for Human Dignity (Italian: L'Istituto Dignitatis Humanae)) was a Christian think tank based in Italy that existed from 2008 to 2021. Its stated mission was to "protect and promote human dignity based on the anthropological truth that man is born in the image and likeness of God."

== History ==
The institute was founded by Benjamin Harnwell, a British man who had worked as an aide to Conservative Party MEP Nirj Deva. According to Harnwell, he was motivated to start the Institute after Italian politician Rocco Buttiglione was vetoed for the position of European Commission Vice President and Commissioner for Justice, Freedom, and Security because he described homosexuality as a sin and said the principal role of women was to have children.

From 2008 to 2011, Harnwell served as the Institute's Chairman. From 2011 to 2013 British royal Lord Nicholas Windsor took over as Chairman. From 2013, the Chairman was Italian politician Luca Volontè. In 2017 it came to light that Volontè had been accepting bribes, which he had funnelled through his Novae Terrae Foundation to then donate to the Institute. In 2021 Volontè was sentenced to four years' imprisonment for corruption.

From 2010 to 2019, Catholic Cardinal Renato Raffaele Martino, former President of the Pontifical Council for Justice and Peace, was Honorary President of the Institute. In 2019, Cardinal Martino resigned because of the Institute's plans to use the Trisulti monastery for political purposes. In 2019, Cardinal Raymond Leo Burke became the new President but resigned later that same year because of "irreconciliable differences" with the leadership of the Institute.

Between 2011 and 2019, the Institute operated from Rome. From 2019 to 2021, the Institute operated from the Abbey of Trisulti, a former monastery in Collepardo, Frosinone. In 2021, the Institute was evicted from the Abbey for non-payment of bills.

For a time, the Institute gained publicity for its association with American pundit Steve Bannon. In 2014, the Institute invited Bannon as one of its key note speakers at a conference to discuss poverty, during which he praised European far-right parties. In 2019, Reuters reported that Bannon had helped the institute to craft curricula for a course it would run training right-wing politicians. A plan was backed by Bannon to turn the Abbey of Trisulti into an academy for training future European nationalists and populist politicians. Cardinal burke, in his brief tenure as President of the Institute, said Bannon would play a leading role in the Institute, helping in "the defense of what used to be called Christendom". The plan never came to fruition because the Institute was evicted from the Abbey due to non-payment of bills.
