= Permanent Observer Mission of the Organisation of Islamic Cooperation to the European Union =

Organization basedin Brussels, Belgium

Permanent Observer Mission of the Organisation of Islamic Cooperation to the European Union Mission Permanente d'Observation de l'Organisation de Coopération Islamique à l'Union Européenne (French)
- Motto: "To safeguard the interests and ensure the progress and well-being of Muslims"
- Representative office: 26 Rue du Trone, Brussels, 1000, Belgium (International territory)
- Official languages: Arabic; English; French

Government
  - Head of the Mission: Abdulkhaleq Al Yafei

Establishment
  - Official inauguration: 25 June 2013
- Website www.oiceumission.org

The Permanent Observer Mission of the Organisation of Islamic Cooperation to the European Union (French: Mission Permanente d'Observation de l'Organisation de Coopération Islamique à l'Union Européenne) is the official representative office of the Organization of Islamic Cooperation (OIC) in Brussels, Belgium. The OIC opened its mission in Brussels in order to contribute and reinforce cooperation and relationship with the European Union (EU) in April 2012, which was followed by the official inauguration by former Secretary General Ekmeleddin İhsanoğlu on 25 June 2013.

Ambassador Abdulkhaleq Al Yafei from UAE is the Permanent Observer since 1 June 2024.

OIC aims at strengthening relations with the European Union and working jointly on political issues including combating terrorism, conflict prevention and post-conflict peacebuilding, combating Islamophobia, providing cultural and informational exchange between the OIC Member States and EU, and promoting interreligious and intercultural dialogue, human rights and humanitarian assistance.
