= Limited partnerships in England and Wales =

In the United Kingdom, a limited partnership consists of:

- one or more persons called general partners, who are liable for all debts and obligations of the firm; and
- one or more persons called limited partners, who contribute a sum/sums of money as capital, or property valued at a stated amount. Limited partners are not liable for the debts and obligations of the firm beyond the amount contributed.

Limited partners may not:

- draw out or receive back any part of their contributions to the partnership during its lifetime; or
- take part in the management of the business or have power to bind the firm.

If they do, they become liable for all the debts and obligations of the firm up to the amount drawn out or received back or incurred while taking part in the management, as the case may be.

Generally speaking, an individual or a legal body such as a company may be a partner in a limited partnership, either as a general or as a limited partner. A person cannot be both a general and a limited partner at the same time.

== Registration process ==
A limited partnership must be registered under the Limited Partnerships Act 1907. To register, you must deliver a statement (Form LP5), signed by all the partners, to the Registrar of Companies. Partnerships whose principal place of business is situated [or proposed to be situated] in England and Wales should send their forms to the Cardiff office; those whose principal place of business is situated or proposed to be situated in Scotland to the Edinburgh office; and those whose principal place of business is situated or proposed to be situated in Northern Ireland to the Belfast office.

The information supplied on the form must include the following:

1. the firm's name;
2. the general nature of the business;
3. the address of the principal place of business;
4. the full name of each partner, listing general and limited partners separately;
5. the term (if any) for which the partnership is entered into;
6. the date of its commencement;
7. a statement that the partnership is limited and the description of every partner as such; and
8. the sum contributed by each limited partner, and whether it is paid in cash or otherwise.

If all these particulars are in order, the Registrar will issue a certificate of registration, subject to the acceptability of the name. The Registrar will advise against the use of any name which is the 'same as' the name of a limited company, other legal body, or another limited partnership already on the register. In addition, the names of limited partnerships are controlled by the Business Names Act 1985.

The general partners are responsible for the delivery of Forms LP5 and LP6 whether or not the preparation of the documents was delegated to accountants or to anyone else.

The Limited Partnerships Act 1907 provides for the imposition of penalties for various defaults in carrying out the requirements of the Acts and for failing to send to the Registrar the required forms.

Notice of any arrangement or transaction under which a general partner will become a limited partner in the firm must be advertised in the London, Edinburgh or Belfast Gazette, as the case may be. Notice must also be advertised in the Gazette of any arrangement or transaction under which a limited partner's share in the firm will be assigned to somebody else. Until this is done these arrangements or transactions have no effect.

== Limit on the number of partners ==
A limited partnership may not normally consist of more than 20 persons. However, under section 717 of the Companies Act 1985 there are a number of exceptions to this rule, including:

- a partnership carrying on practice as solicitors and consisting of persons each of whom is a solicitor;
- a partnership carrying on practice as accountants where the partnership is eligible for appointment as a company auditor;
- a partnership carrying on business as members of a recognised stock exchange and consisting of persons each of whom is a member of that exchange;
- a partnership carrying on business as surveyors, auctioneers, valuers, estate agents, land agents, or estate managers and consisting of persons of whom at least three-quarters are members of the Royal Institution of Chartered Surveyors and of whom not more than one-quarter are limited partners;
- a partnership carrying on business as insurance brokers and consisting of persons each of whom is a registered insurance broker or an enrolled body corporate. (For the meaning of 'registered insurance broker' and 'enrolled body corporate' see section 29(1) of the Insurance Brokers (Registration) Act 1977.);and
- a partnership which is a collective investment scheme the operator of which, or the manager of the investments of which, is an authorised person under Part IV of the Financial Services and Markets Act 2000 or a European Economic Area firm or a Treaty firm with permission under the Act to operate the scheme or manage the investments.

== See also ==
- Partnership
