= Hakkı Keskin =

Turkish-German politician

Hakkı Keskin (born 12 February 1943 in Maçka, Trabzon, Turkey) is a Turkish-German politician with the Left Party (die Linkspartei), formerly of the Social Democratic Party of Germany (SPD) and a professor of political science. He was the first person of Turkish descent to become a member of a German parliament (the Bürgerschaft in Hamburg) and is seen as one of the prominent leaders of the country's Turkish community.

== Biography ==
Born in Turkey, Keskin went to High school in Erzincan and moved to Germany to pursue his tertiary education at the Free University of Berlin where he obtained a PhD in Political Science. Returning to Turkey, he served as a planning advisor to Turkish prime minister Bülent Ecevit. In 1980, he joined academia of the Professional School for Administration and Justice in Berlin. In 1982, he became a professor for politics and migration policy at the Hamburg University of Applied Sciences (HAW) . Keskin became the first person of Turkish descent to become a member of a German parliament in 1993, as representative in the Bürgerschaft of the Free and Hanseatic city of Hamburg for the SPD. In 1995, he formed the Türkische Gemeinde Deutschlands, a Turkish community organization, to which he became president.

In June 2005, he withdrew from the Social Democratic Party in protest of its policies and joined the Left Party for whom he subsequently became an opposition MDB in the September 2005 elections. His move prompted the defection of German Federal Constitutional Court justice Wolfgang Neskovic, and the former SPD leader in Baden-Württemberg, Ulrich Maurer from the Social Democrats to the Left Party. Hakkı Keskin is married with two children.

== Books ==
- Deutschland als neue Heimat. Eine Bilanz der Integrationspolitik, Verl. für Sozialwissenschaft, Wiesbaden 2005, ISBN 3-531-14673-4

== See also ==
- Turks in Germany
