= CitizenGO =

Ultra-conservative advocacy group

- Fundación CitizenGO
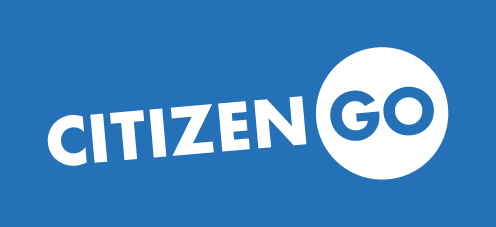
- Predecessor: HazteOir
- Formation: September 2013; 13 years ago
- Founder: Ignacio Arsuaga
- Founded at: Madrid, Spain
- Type: NGO, foundation
- Headquarters: Conde de Peñalver 52, Madrid, Spain
- Region served: Worldwide
- Method: Internet activism, online petitions
- President: Ignacio Arsuaga
- Statutory representative: Antonio Velázquez
- Board of trustees: Brian S. Brown, Luca Volontè, Blanca Escobar, Gualberto García, Carlos Polo, Ignacio Arsuaga
- Budget: 5,333,133 EUR (2024)
- Website: https://citizengo.org

CitizenGO is a conservative advocacy group founded in Madrid, Spain, in 2013.

The foundation promotes petitions in 50 countries, mostly defending Christian causes, and opposing same-sex marriage, abortion, and euthanasia.

The European Commission found CitizenGo to be one of main founders of far-right campaigns across Europe and the United Kingdom.

== History ==
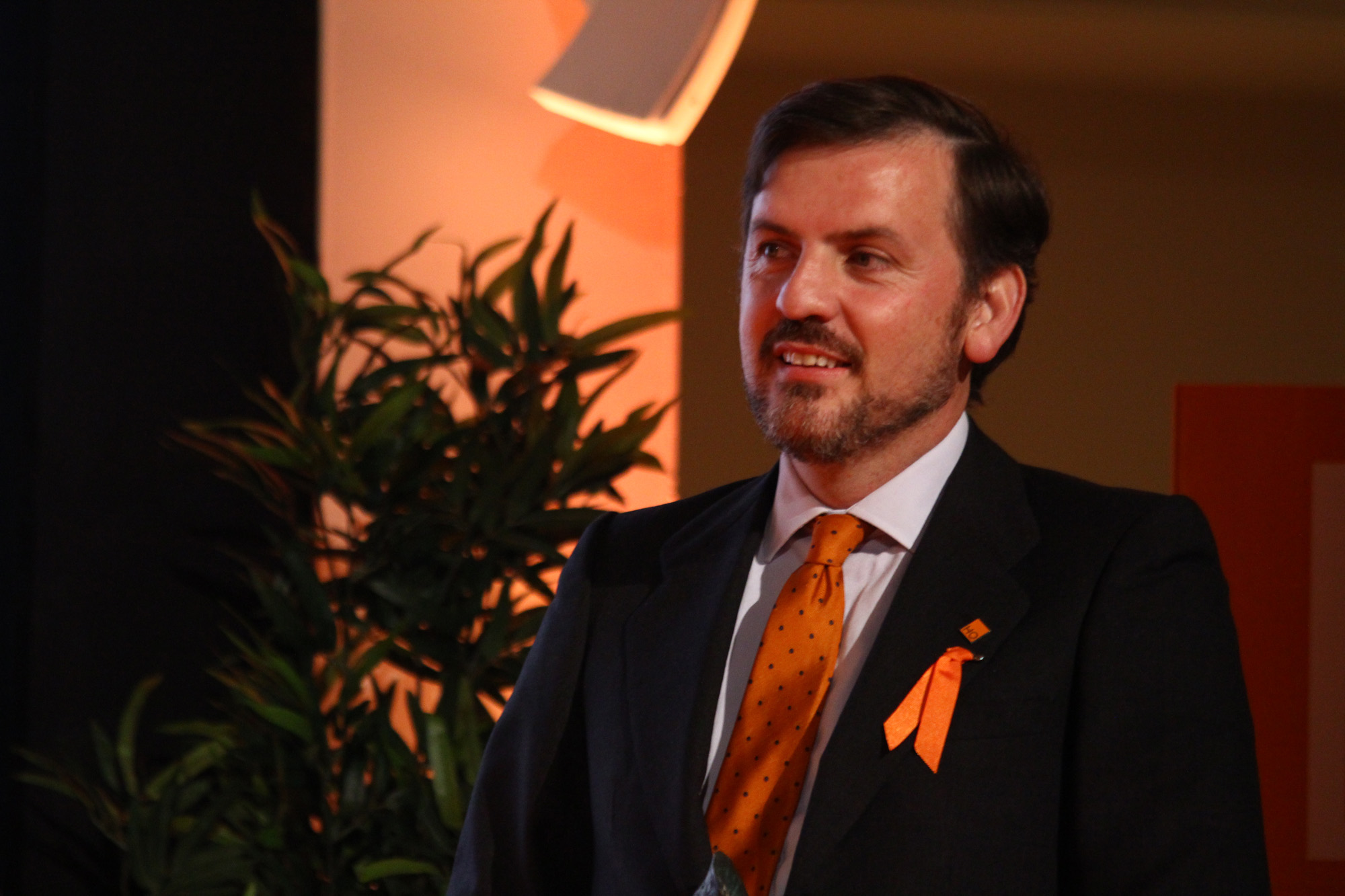
Ignacio Arsuaga, founder and president of HazteOir and CitizenGo

In 2001, lawyer Ignacio Arsuaga founded HazteOir (literally, "Make yourself heard"). This organization later merged into and became part of CitizenGO, a move that was considered a "rebranding".

CitizenGO was founded in Madrid, Spain, in September 2013 by HazteOir, (whose founder and president is also Ignacio Arsuaga), to expand its scope of action beyond Spanish-speaking countries, advancing the use of online petitions as a form of Internet activism to increase public participation in the democratic process. In appealing to potential donors early in CitizenGO's existence, Arsuaga stated: "CitizenGO will produce a social benefit that we trust will impact human history. Abortionists, the homosexual lobby, radical secularists, and champions of relativism will find themselves behind CitizenGO's containment wall".

CitizenGO stated that it had "team members located in fifteen cities on three continents", facilitating petition campaigns in 50 countries and eight languages, with plans for further expansion, and that it was funded through online donations from its members. Following its foundation, CitizenGO’s chief executive officer was Álvaro Zulueta. Over time, the board of trustees came to include several internationally known figures of conservative and religious activism associated with transnational networks. In addition to Arsuaga, trustees included Walter Hintz, Blanca Escobar, Luca Volontè (Unione dei Democratici Cristiani politician), Brian S. Brown (president of the anti-LGBT rights National Organization for Marriage), Gualberto García, Alexey Komov (Russian representative of the World Congress of Families, considered a close ally of pro-Vladimir Putin Russian oligarch Konstantin Malofeev), Alejandro Bermúdez, John-Henry Westen, and Carlos Polo.

The foundation has been linked, like HazteOir, to El Yunque, a secret society of Mexican regional origin.

In 2021, CitizenGO board member Luca Volontè was sentenced to four years in prison for accepting bribes from Azerbaijan during the Azerbaijani laundromat affair in exchange for suppressing a report on Azerbaijan's human rights record. Some of these laundered funds were transferred to CitizenGO.

Sociologists McLean and Stretesky describe CitizenGo as part of "a veritable miasma of anti-trans campaign groups [...] united in their antipathy toward transgender people".

== Activities ==
=== Abortion and euthanasia ===
CitizenGO promotes campaigns opposing abortion and euthanasia. CitizenGO has opposed the introduction of the "Estrela report" into the European Parliament, which recommends member states to provide comprehensive sex education in schools and ensure access to abortions, among other things.

In late May 2019, CitizenGO hosted a petition by "Right to Life" calling on streaming service Netflix to stop funding a legal challenge to Georgia's controversial heartbeat abortion restriction bill. The group also called for subscribers to cancel their Netflix subscription as a sign of protest.

It has also supported African activistAnn Kioko's campaign to investigate pro-abortion rights group Marie Stopes International. After Kioko was put on trial, CitizenGO used their platform to promote the idea that the Kenyan government wants to censor the protests of CitizenGO and other anti-abortion outlets.

=== Defense of the Russian gay propaganda law ===
In 2013, CitizenGO signed a declaration in support of the Russian law which had the stated purpose of protecting children from being exposed to homosexuality, but had the practical effect that hate crimes against LGBTQ people increased by two to three times soon after its introduction.

=== Second Coming comic series ===
In February 2019, CitizenGO organized a petition calling on DC Vertigo to cancel Mark Russell and Richard Pace's Second Coming comic series, which they regarded as blasphemous for its depiction of Jesus Christ. Russell subsequently confirmed that it had been his decision to request the return of the rights to the series.

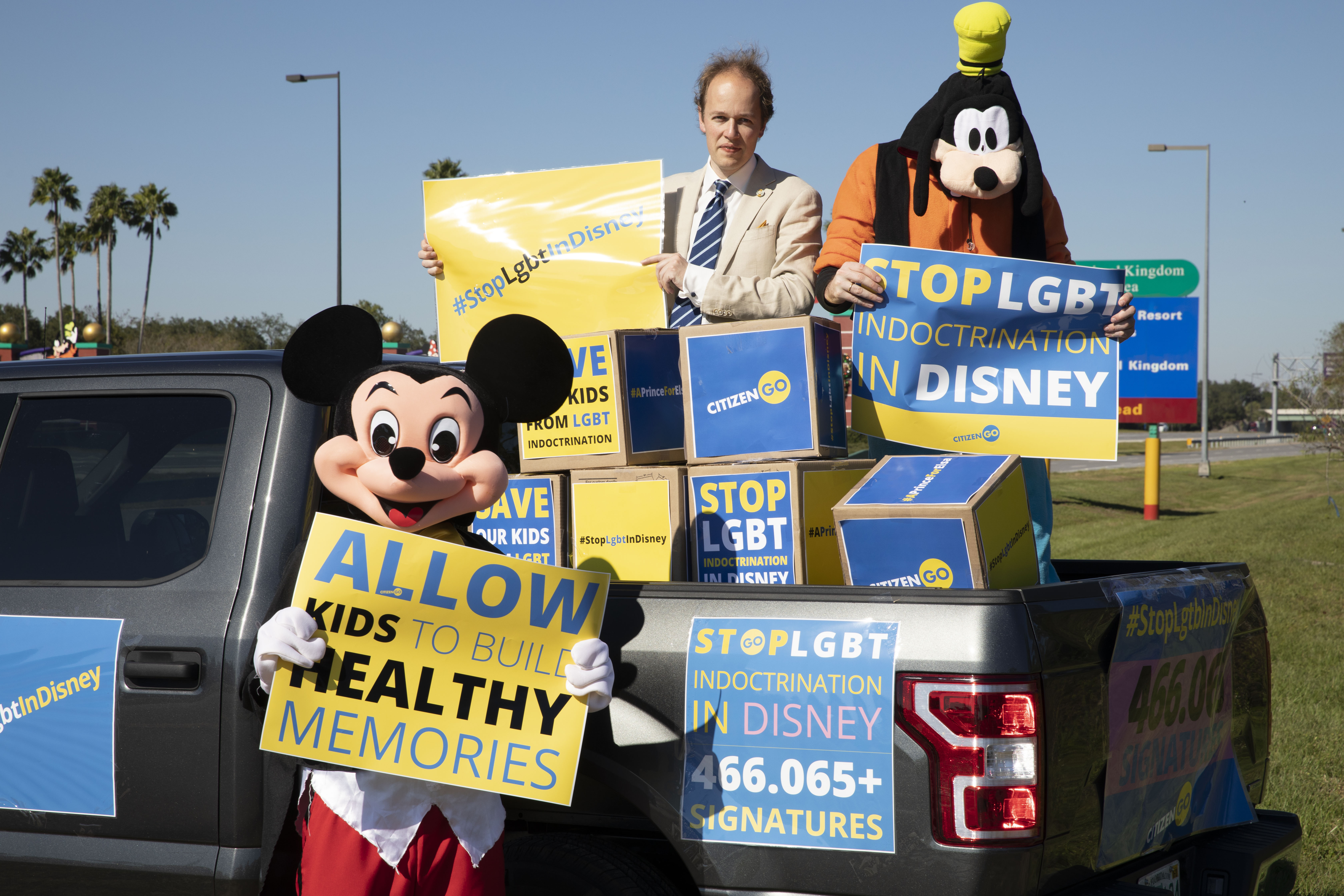
Anti-Walt Disney petition campaign by CitizenGo (2019)

=== 2019 Disneyland "Magical Parade" ===
In late May 2018, CitizenGO circulated a petition calling on Disneyland Paris to cancel a scheduled pride parade called the "Magical Parade" on 1 June 2019. The Walt Disney Company rejected the petition and the Magical Parade went ahead in Paris.

=== LGBTQ rights and reproductive health misinformation campaign in Kenya ===
CitizenGO Africa opposes decriminalising homosexuality in Kenya. According to a 2021 investigation by Mozilla Foundation, it also engaged in spreading misinformation concerning reproductive health policy in the country through a tweets and hashtags on Twitter as well as paying Kenyans to also tweet against debated legislation, which aimed to develop guidelines for surrogacy as well as improving reproductive health care and rights.

=== Paradise PD TV series ===
In 2021, CitizenGO started a campaign to have the episode "Trigger Warning" from the TV series Paradise PD removed from Netflix because of a depiction of Jesus Christ in which he is seen attacking his persecutors with machine guns and having sex with two women.

== Reception ==
In the 2024 book Who's Afraid of Gender?, feminist theorist Judith Butler characterizes CitizenGO as an important part of the worldwide anti-gender movement.

== See also ==
- Internet activism
- Online petition
