= Luca Volontè =

Italian politician (born 1966)

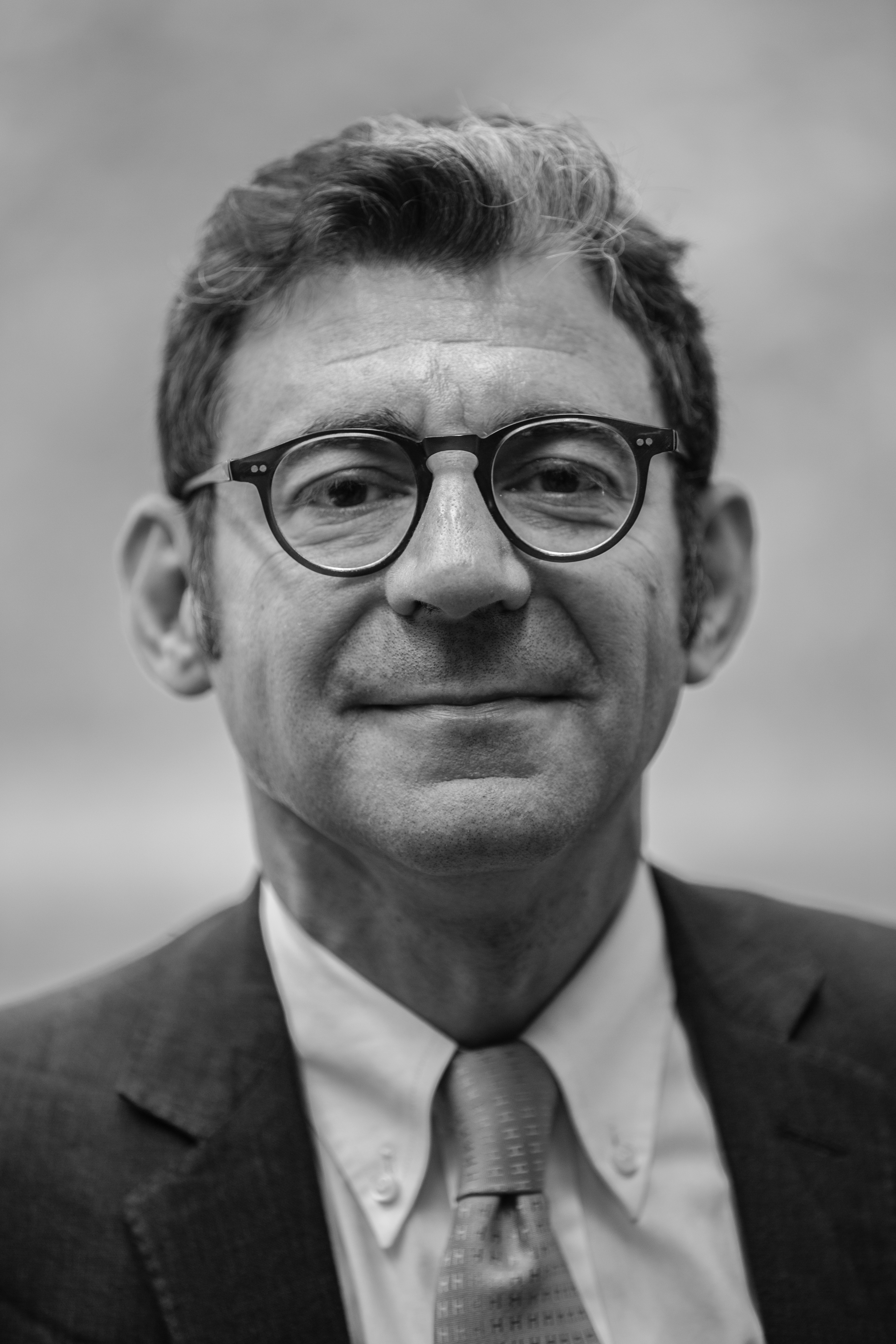

Member of the Chamber of Deputies
- In office 9 May 1996 – 14 March 2013
- Parliamentary group: CCD-CDU (1996–2002); UdC (2002–2013)
- Constituency: Lombardy 2 (1993–2017)

Personal details
- Party: UdC (from 2002)
- Other political affiliations: DC (to 1994); PPI (1994–1995); CDU (1995–2002)
- Education: Degree in political science
- Alma mater: University of Milan

Luca Volontè (born 17 March 1966) is an Italian politician, born in Saronno (Lombardy), a graduate in Political Science from the University of Milan, formerly a member of the Union of the Centre.

== Political career ==
In 1994, Luca Volontè became in charge of the local entities in the Italian Popular Party (PPI). He followed Rocco Buttiglione in the split from the PPI, which led to the foundation of the CDU, where he became an organizational manager.

Luca Volontè was elected to the Chamber of Deputies from the second constituency of Lombardy during the elections of 1996. He was re-elected in 2001, 2006 and 2008.

From 2010 to 2013 he served as Chairman of the parliamentary group of the European People's Party in the Parliamentary Assembly of the Council of Europe.

== Corruption charges, conviction and acquittals ==
Following investigative reports, published by the European Stability Initiative on "Caviar diplomacy", in June 2016, the Milan prosecutor's office brought charges against Luca Volontè on 2 episodes: money laundering and accepting bribes. In 2017, it was also revealed that Volontè had been involved in the Azerbaijani laundromat scandal - a complex money-laundering scheme used to pay off European politicians in an attempt to whitewash Azerbaijan’s reputation abroad. According to the Prosecutor's Office Volontè received €2.39 million to organise support for Azerbaijani officials in the Council of Europe. Part of the money went through Volontè's Novae Terrae Foundation to lobbies Iona Institute, CitizenGO (he was a member of its board), the ECI Mum, Dad & Kids initiative against equal marriage and Dignitatis Humanae Institute. In January 2021, Criminal Section X of the Court of Milan sentenced Luca Volontè to four years in prison for taking bribes from Azerbaijani politicians. On December 22, 2021, Volonté was acquitted of the accusation of money laundering, Verdict No.8364. On May 22nd of the same year the Court of Appeals in Milan acquitted him, Verdict No. 3549, due to the statute of limitations, as Corriere dell Sera wrote|: "international corruption conviction prescribed", "The statute of limitations evaporates in the Court of Appeal in Milan one of the few sentences (at 4 years) for international corruption, even rarer because it is centered on 500,000 euros paid in 2012-2013 by the then representative of Azerbaijan to the Parliamentary Assembly of the Council of Europe, Elkhan Suleymanov (with his collaborator Muslum Mammadov), to the Italian deputy Udc Luca Volontè". https://milano.corriere.it/notizie/cronaca/22 maggio 18/luca-volonte-soldi-dell-azerbaijan-consiglio-ue-prescritta-condanna-corruzione-internazionale-5b438fb4-d676-11ec-a70e-c4b6ac55d57f.shtml?refresh ce It was confirmed the following year by the High Court (Corte di Cassazione) on May 24, 2023, Verdict No.28227. The other charges have all been extinguished under the Statute of Limitations.
