= Eduard Lintner =

German politician

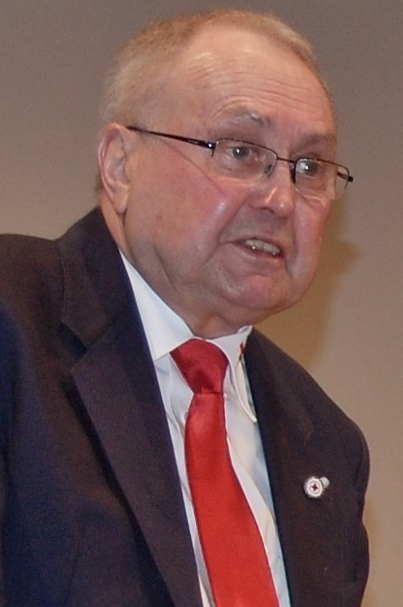
- Lintner in 2013

Member of the Bundestag; from Bavaria
- In office 14 December 1976 – 27 October 2009
- Preceded by: Multi-member district
- Succeeded by: Dorothee Bär
- Constituency: State list (1976–1980); Bad Kissingen (1980–2009)

Personal details
- Born: 4 November 1944 (age 82) Marktlangendorf, Sudetenland
- Party: Christian Social Union
- Children: 4
- Education: University of Würzburg
- Awards: Cross of the Order of Merit of the Federal Republic of Germany

Eduard Lintner (born 4 November 1944) is a German politician and lobbyist. From 1976 to 2009 he served as a member of the Bundestag.

He also served from 1991 to 1998 as Parliamentary State Secretary for the Federal Secretary of the Interior and from 1992 to 1998 he was the Drug Enforcement Officer in the Federal Government.

In 2017, it was revealed that Lintner had lobbied on behalf of the authoritarian regime in Azerbaijan and has been involved in the Azerbaijani laundromat scandal, which was a complex money-laundering scheme, used to pay off European politicians in an attempt to whitewash Azerbaijan's reputation abroad.

== Early life and education ==
After graduating from school in Cham in 1966, Lintner studied jurisprudence at the Julius Maximilian University of Würzburg. In 1973 he passed the second state examination and worked in the administration of the State of Bavaria until 1976 and subsequently worked as a councilor in the Kitzingen district office. In 1981 he was admitted to the bar in Bad Neustadt.

Lintner joined the CSU and the Junge Union (JU) in 1962, while still at school. From 1970 to 1972 he was chairman of the JU district association for Würzburg and from 1972 to 1978 chairman of the JU district association of Lower Franconia.

== Political career ==
From 1972 to 1974 Lintner was elected member of the municipal council of Erlabrunn.

From 1976 to 2009 he was a member of the German Bundestag. From 1982 to 1990 also served as chairman of the German Politics and Berlin Issues working group of the CDU/CSU parliamentary group.

After the federal elections in 1990, Lintner was appointed Parliamentary State Secretary to the Federal Minister of the Interior in the federal government led by Chancellor Helmut Kohl on 24 January 1991. From 27 August 1992, he was also the Federal Government's first drug commissioner. After the 1998 Bundestag elections, he left the office on 26 October 1998.

In 1999 Lintner became a member of the Parliamentary Assembly of the Council of Europe (PACE) and the Western European Union. From 2002 to 2005 he was chairman of the Legal and Human Rights Committee of the Council of Europe.

Eduard Lintner was chairman of the Lower Franconia District Association of the Bavarian Red Cross until 2017 and has been its honorary member ever since.

In his political career, Eduard Lintner has focused on maintaining relations with the states of Latin America and the South Caucasus. As part of this activity, he was also the initiator of the Bundestag resolution to shape Germany's relations with the states of the South Caucasus. After he stopped running for the Bundestag in the 2009 elections, Lintner founded the "Society for the Promotion of German-Azerbaijani Relations" based in Berlin and has been its sole managing partner ever since.

=== Voting in the Council of Europe ===
In 2007 Eduard Lintner made the headlines as for voting against resolution 1580 (2007) in the Council of Europe. The resolution calls on the member states to actively counter the views expressed by creationists or supporters of "intelligent design" and to classify them as a threat to freedom and democracy in Europe. The resolution aimed to support Darwin's theory of evolution in teaching of biology in public schools in Europe. Lintner denied supporting creationist theories and explained his voting behavior by saying that the dangers of creationism were greatly exaggerated in the text of the resolution and that with this resolution the Council of Europe was improperly attempting to intervene in the educational sovereignty of the German federal states.

=== Lobbying for Azerbaijan and indictment for corruption ===
Eduard Lintner has been actively lobbying for the government of Azerbaijan, which is known for serious human rights violations and heavy crackdown on opposition. He was on the board of trustees of the German-Azerbaijani Forum, a lobbying association that is close to the autocratic Azerbaijani regime, which was described by Lobbycontrol as a "dubious Azerbaijan network" and made the headlines in the wake of the "Aserbaidschan-Affäre" lobbying scandal in the German Bundestag. Bank records show that Lintner received multiple payments through a branch of Danske Bank in Estonia as part of an "Azerbaijani laundromat" money laundering scheme. According to a report published by the European Stability Initiative, Lintner organized an election observation delegation for the presidential elections in Azerbaijan in 2013. The delegation published a positive assessment of the elections, although independent election observers had pointed out extensive election fraud. Lintner, on the other hand, stated that the elections "met German standards". Two weeks later, Lintner received 61,000 euros from Azerbaijan. His organization received a total of 819,500 euros from front companies between 2012 and 2014. Lintner, in turn, transferred large sums of money to pro-regime politicians in Germany and Belgium. This was also made known through the Panama Papers.

The Frankfurt public prosecutor's office is investigating Lintner on the initial suspicion of corruption; the police searched several offices and private premises in Germany and Belgium. Lintner's CDU parliamentary group colleague Karin Strenz was also investigated until her death on 21 March 2021.

In 2018, Eduard Lintner and Karin Strenz were banned from the Council of Europe and its parliamentary assembly for life due to investigations by the EU.

In January 2024 German prosecutors brought bribery and corruption charges against Eduard Lintner and another CDU member - Axel Fischer. Lintner was found guilty of bribery on 30 July 2025 by a court in Munich. The judge considered it proven, that between 2006 and 2008 Lintner received some 4 million Euros from Azerbaijan using shell corporations. Money from Azerbaijan was then passed on to Parliamentary Assembly members Axel Fischer and Karin Strenz. Lintner was sentenced to 18 month in prison, but the 88-year old was granted probation.
