= Wojciech Sawicki =

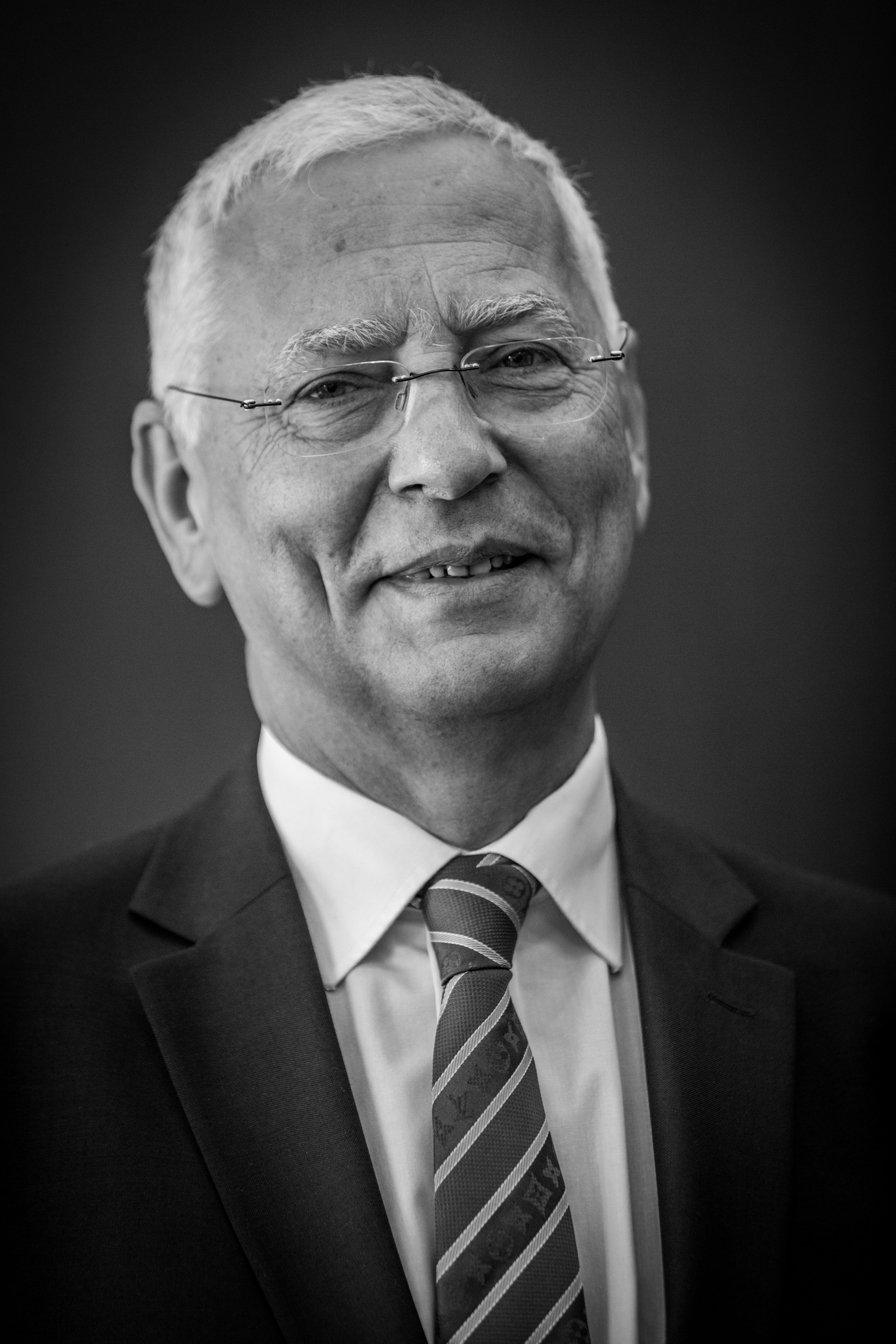
- Wojciech Sawicki, 2014.
- Born: March 20, 1955 (age 71); Warsaw, Poland
- Education: University of Warsaw
- Occupations: programmer, official
- Known for: Secretary General of the Parliamentary Assembly of the Council of Europe (2011–2021)
- Spouse: Beata Sawicka

Wojciech Sawicki (born 20 March 1955 in Warsaw) served as the Secretary General of the Parliamentary Assembly of the Council of Europe (PACE), a body bringing together parliamentarians from the national parliaments of the 47 Council of Europe member states, for a ten-year period from February 2011 to February 2021.

He was twice elected to the post by the members of the Assembly, serving two five-year terms of office, and headed a 90-strong multi-national secretariat based in Strasbourg, France.

From 1990–96 he served as Secretary General of the Polish Senate, the upper house of the Polish parliament, playing a leading role in helping to re-establish democracy in Poland after the collapse of communism in 1989.

Presenting his candidacy to PACE members in 2010, he said: “Being from Poland – a country which was cut off from most of Europe by the Iron Curtain and where, for years, I participated actively in the democratic opposition movement – I know the true value and real meaning of democracy, human rights and the rule of law. I know how important it is for Europe to be united in defence of these principles.”

== Duties of the PACE Secretary General ==
In line with the Assembly’s Rules of Procedure, the Secretary General ensures the proper functioning of PACE and the fulfilment of its mandate. He heads a secretariat of around 90 staff which assists the Assembly’s members – including its President – to carry out their work, and ensures the proper conduct of parliamentary proceedings. Combining political acumen, administrative ability, impartiality and personal integrity, he also upholds its

== Career ==
=== At the Council of Europe ===
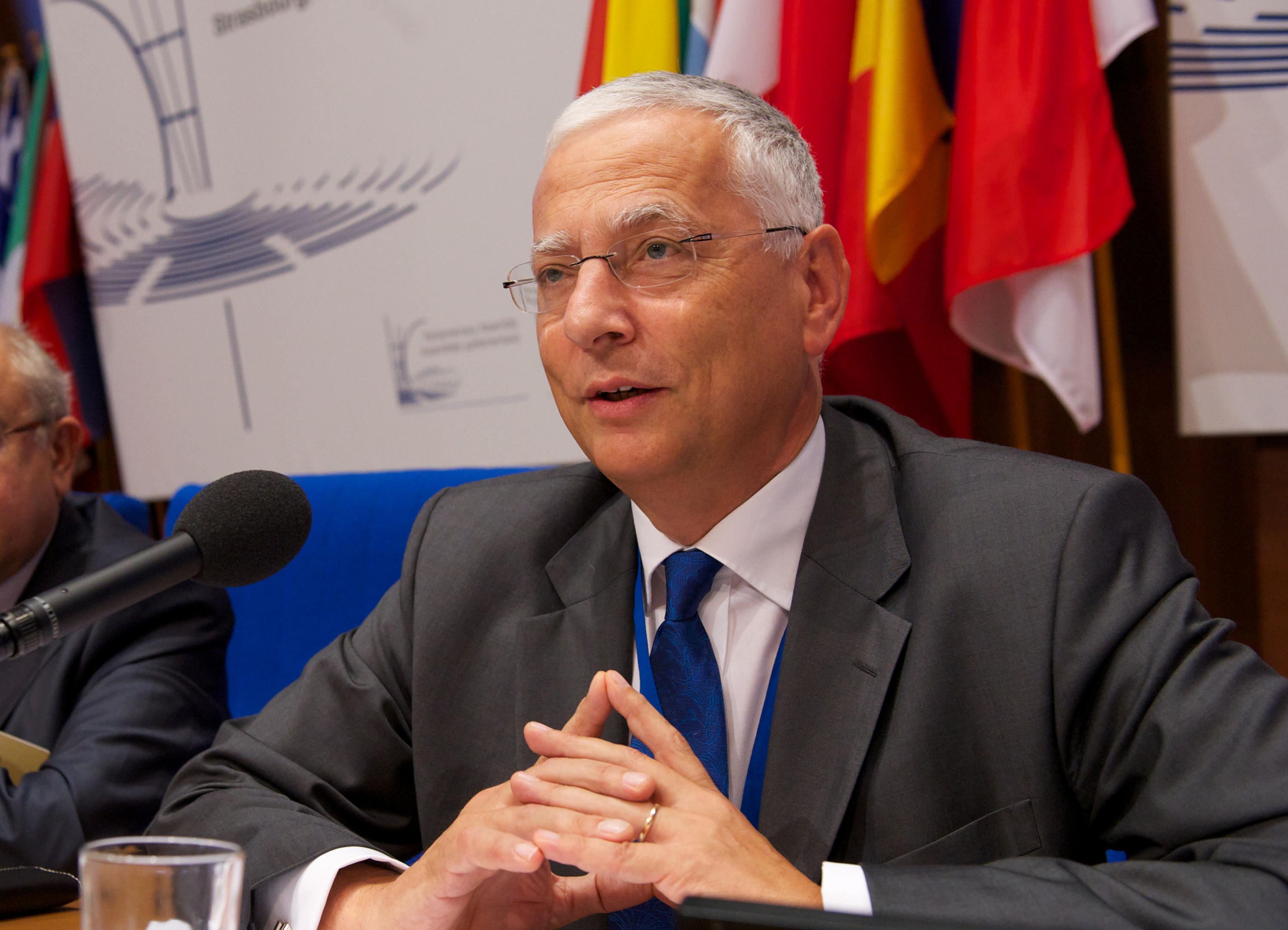
Wojciech Sawicki, Secretary General of the Parliamentary Assembly of the Council of Europe.

In June 1996, Wojciech Sawicki left Poland to take up his duties at the Council of Europe as Director (Deputy Clerk) and Head of the General Services Department of the Parliamentary Assembly. He held this office until 2006, when he became Director General of the Secretariat of the Parliamentary Assembly and Deputy to the Secretary General of the Assembly. In 2009, he took on the additional post of Acting Secretary General of the Congress of Local and Regional Authorities of the Council of Europe, which he held for six months. From 1996 to 2011 he was also Co-director of the European Centre for Parliamentary Research and Documentation (ECPRD).

=== In Poland ===
From 1990 to 1996 he held the post of Secretary General of the Polish Senate, the first to hold this post after the collapse of communism, where he was responsible for establishing and managing its activities, providing political, legal and procedural advice to all its statutory organs and maintaining contacts with the secretariats of other parliaments.

From 1977 to 1990, he was Programmer and Head of Department in the Power Industry Computer Centre in Warsaw. From 1980 to 1981, he was Chairman of the Centre’s “Solidarity” Trade Union Section.

In 1979, the year after he obtained his M. Sc. in computer sciences, Wojciech Sawicki became a lecturer at the Polish Academy of Sciences in Warsaw. He held this post until 1986.

== Miscellaneous ==
Since 1990 he has been a member of the Association of Secretaries General of Parliaments.

From 1979 to 1996 he was a member of the Executive Committee of the Warsaw Club of Catholic Intellectuals, and from 1981 to 1984 its Vice-President.

From 1981 to 1987 he was a member of Poland’s Church Committee to Assist Political Prisoners and their Families and head of the Committee’s Registry and Information Office, responsible for setting up and managing the information system.

== Personal details ==
=== Education ===
In 1978 he obtained an MSc. in computer sciences, specialising in operational systems, from the Faculty of Mathematics and Computer Sciences of Warsaw University. Mr Sawicki speaks Polish, English, French and Russian.

=== Family life ===
Wojciech Sawicki is married to Beata Sawicka, an artist by training who has studied fine arts in Rouen, Gdansk and Warsaw. They have two daughters and a son.

In October 2012, together with her younger daughter Magdalena and her mother Alina, both of whom are also artists, Beata Sawicka organised an exhibition in Strasbourg entitled “De Mères en Filles”, reflecting the artistic continuity that has been seen in the family across three generations.

== Distinctions ==
In 2002, he was awarded the Gold Cross of Merit (Poland).

In 2011, he was awarded the Commander Cross of the Order of the Polish Renaissance (Polonia Restituta).

In 2022, he was awarded the Order of Prince Yaroslav the Wise (third class) by President Volodymyr Zelenskyy.

== Notes and references ==
- Biography on the website of the Parliamentary Assembly of the Council of Europe
- "Pole elected Secretary General of the Parliamentary Assembly of the Council of Europe", article, Gazeta.pl, 5 October 2010 (in Polish)
- Announcement of Independence Day honours, official website of the Polish President (in Polish)
