= Iona Institute =

Irish conservative Catholic organisation

- Iona Institute logo
- Established: January 2007; 19 years ago
- Founder: David Quinn
- Type: NGO
- Location: 23 Merrion Square, Dublin
- Chairman: John Murray
- Director: David Quinn
- Key people: Patricia Casey; Breda O'Brien; James Sheehan; Vincent Twomey; Ken Clarke; Maria Steen
- Website: ionainstitute.ie

Lolek CLG, operating under the business name the Iona Institute, is an Irish, socially conservative organisation that advocates the advancement and promotion of the Christian religion and what it sees as the religion's social and moral values. It has been frequently described as a Catholic pressure group. Founded by columnist David Quinn, it was launched publicly in 2007.

Iona promotes conservative Christian values and opposes abortion, euthanasia, assisted suicide, same-sex marriage, civil partnerships, lifting restrictions on divorce, adoptions by same-sex couples, sperm donation, egg donation, surrogacy and the children's rights referendum. It takes the view that crime is rising, family breakdown is increasing, and that drug abuse and other social problems are caused by fewer people obtaining opposite-sex marriages and participating in organised religion. The institute has released a number of reports and has also hosted talks in support of its aims. Quinn and other prominent members have weekly columns in Ireland's mainstream press.

In 2022, Iona was included in a list of extremist groups by the Global Project against Hate and Extremism, for which Iona was reportedly "consider[ing] legal action".

== Background ==
Irish society underwent a period of rapid secularisation during the 1990s and 2000s. In 1992, two referendums established the right to travel abroad to obtain an abortion and the right to information about foreign abortion services. In 1993, homosexuality was decriminalised. The 1995 referendum approved the removal of the constitutional ban on divorce.

Throughout the 1990s and 2000s, a series of criminal cases and Irish government enquiries established that hundreds of Catholic priests had abused thousands of children over decades. The widespread abuse scandals and cover-ups by Church authorities led to a decline in influence of the Catholic Church in Irish society.

The Iona Institute was formed in 2006 to promote Christian social teachings in an attempt to prevent and reverse the secularisation of Irish society.

== Incorporation ==
Lolek Ltd was incorporated on 16 August 2006 as a company limited by guarantee. "Lolek" was the childhood nickname of Pope John Paul II. Lolek registered the business name "The Iona Institute" which it operates under in public. "Iona" is a reference to Iona Abbey which was an important centre of Celtic Christianity founded by Irish monks.

Unlike the UK, the word "Institute" is not a protected term in Ireland and can be used in the name of any company. The use of "institute" has been challenged by notable public commentators such as Graham Norton who said "it is just a feeble attempt to give themselves a veneer of considered intellectual respectability." David Norris referred to "the so-called Iona Institute" as "an unelected, unrepresentative group of reactionary, right-wing, religiously motivated people".

In 2016, the company changed its name to Lolek CLG as required under the Companies Act 2014. It also adopted a new constitution.

Lolek CLG is a company limited by guarantee and does not have share capital or shareholders. The company consists of eight members, whose liability to the company upon winding-up is limited to a maximum of €1 each.

Lolek's current board members are John Murray, Sean Ascough, Evanna Boyle, Brendan Conroy, Eanna Johnston and Tom Finegan. Lolek's former members include: Tom Ascough, Patrick Kenny, Susan Hegarty, John Reid, Andrew O'Connell and John Smyth.

Lolek also has self-described "patrons" associated with the company; the psychiatrist Patricia Casey, columnist Breda O'Brien, Roman Catholic priest Vincent Twomey, James Sheehan, and Church of Ireland bishop Ken Clarke. Dr. Angelo Bottone serves as a part-time research officer for the institute.

=== Ideology ===
Iona is commonly described as right-wing, conservative Catholic lobby group.

Lolek's founding memorandum of association states their objective as "[t]he advancement and promotion of the Christian religion, its social and moral values, and the doing of all such other things as are incidental or conductive to the attainment of that object."

In 2013, Iona spokesperson Patricia Casey denied that it was specifically Catholic or Christian, saying "We support the role of religion in society but we're not a religiously-based organisation." In 2014, John Murray said that the Church of Ireland bishop Ken Clarke's becoming a patron proved Iona's stances were "not specific to any particular Christian denomination."

Lolek's registered address is 23 Merrion Square, Dublin which it shares with a number of Roman Catholic organisations:

- Vocations Society of St Joseph – which supports young men training to be Catholic priests;
- Pure in Heart – which promotes the Roman Catholic Church and evangelises school children and young people to practice chastity;
- Columba Press – which publishes Catholic religious and theological books;
- Apostolate of Eucharistic Adoration – which promotes Eucharistic adoration in dioceses and parishes, conformity with Roman Catholic teachings and full obedience to bishops and priests;
- The Irish Catholic was registered at the address for the period 2015 to 2020. David Quinn is a former editor and weekly columnist for the paper.
- Religious Vocation Association – a former charity set-up for the "advancement of religion". The Charities Regulator deregistered the organisation from the Register of Charities as it was deemed to no longer have an exemption under Irish tax law.
- Vocations Ireland – a registered charity for the "advancement of religion" formerly operated from the address. It is now registered care of the Missionaries of Africa (White Fathers) CLG in Templeogue, Dublin. As of April 2022, the charity is not fully compliant with Charities Governance Code. The charity's explanation for non-compliance is that it is winding up.

=== Charitable status ===
Lolek is a registered charity using the category of "advancement of religion" to qualify; hence its does not pay any tax on its income. Lolek's constitution and charitable status legally restrict the company's activities to promoting and advancing religion. However, it has been criticised as portraying itself as a secular organisation and avoiding the use of religious arguments in political campaigns; along with purposely hiding its affiliation with the Catholic Church. Senator David Norris criticised Iona's charitable status in a Seanad Éireann debate saying that it was "the most ideologically driven group I have come across and it is not a charity. I would be very interested to know how it receives charitable status for such a campaigning political group?" During the same debate, Senator Martin Conway stated that "[i]t is shocking that the Iona Institute has charitable status."

In the run-up to the 2015 same-sex marriage referendum, opponents argued that Iona's activities were political and that it was therefore legally required to register with the Standards in Public Office Commission (SIPO), which monitors political donations. Organisations which receive a donation of €100 or more for political purposes are considered a "third party" and must register with SIPO and submit their accounts for analysis. On 20 February, SIPO contacted Iona and asked them to consider whether they were required to register as a third party and to confirm whether they had received political donations exceed the €100 threshold and to reply before the 31 March deadline.

On 4 March, Iona told SIPO that it did not receive any political donations exceeding €100 and that it was not going to register as a third party. Atheist Ireland wrote to SIPO on 20 April with examples of political activity carried out by Iona. SIPO responded that it is their practice to accept a group's declaration that it has considered whether it is a third party and that it has not received a political donation. However, on 23 April, seven weeks after declaring that they had not received any relevant political donations, Iona reversed its decision and registered as a third party. Iona explained that its change of policy was because it wanted to "play a fuller part" in the referendum and that intended to distribute "a minimum of half a million leaflets".

Lolek's financial statements reveal that it received a total of €355,437 in donations during 2015; consisting of €149,830 "regular" donations and €205,607 relating to the marriage referendum. A substantial increase in revenue compared to receiving just €202,677 donations in 2014 and only €170,032 in 2014. The statements report that all of Lolek's income is attributable to the Irish market.

In 2018, the same year as the abortion referendum, Lolek received €441,696 in donations. Again a substantial increase compared with receiving €218,798 in the prior year and €208,130 in the following year. No breakdown was provided as to how much were regular donations and how much were political donations.

In 2016, Lolek adopted a new constitution which removed prior explicit references to the promotion of Christianity and Christian social and moral values from the object of the company. The 2016 constitution gives the objects for which the company was established to be [t]he promotion and advancement of marriage and religion in society and the doing of all such other things as are incidental or conductive to the attainment of the above object."

=== Funding ===
Lolek is required to report its income by filing annual financial statements with the Companies Registration Office. Lolek does not disclose the source of its income other than it consists of private donations received due to its activity in Ireland.

The source of Iona's funding and whether it is compliant with Irish law have been regularly raised in the Irish media, in Dáil Éireann and Seanad Éireann. However, no evidence of irregularities has ever emerged.

In 2021, the European Parliamentary Forum for Sexual and Reproductive Rights published a report, "Tip of the Iceberg", which claimed that the Iona Institute, among others, had received substantial funding from Russia to pursue an anti-gender/anti-trans rights agenda. The Novae Terrae Foundation was identified as the immediate donor to the Iona Institute, after it had in turn benefited from €2.39 million from a Russian-Azerbaijani "laundromat" designed to channel funds to like-minded campaign groups. It states that some of this funding was then routed to the European Christian Political Movement, which campaigns on a socially conservative and Christian right basis. In a blog entry, founder David Quinn called the claim "absurd".

While the Novae Terrae Foundation was never investigated and continued its charitable activities, its founder was charged for money laundering and bribery, and eventually acquitted.

During the 2015 marriage referendum campaign, David Quinn admitted that a substantial amount of Iona's foreign funding, around €24,000, came from the Novae Terrae Foundation. He denied that the money was used in the marriage referendum campaign.

David Quinn contributed an essay to the 2010 publication Exiting a Dead End Road: A GPS for Christians in Public Discourse which was funded by the Novae Terrae Foundation.

== Agenda Europe ==
Iona is closely linked with Agenda Europe; a secretive network of European ultra-conservative organisations which oppose LGBT rights, abortion, contraception, assisted reproduction technologies, surrogacy, euthanasia and divorce.

The activity of the group was exposed in a leak to the television channel Arte in 2017; a cache of documents revealed that Agenda Europe was founded in a "strictly confidential" meeting in London in January 2013; that it held annual "summits" and that it has a common manifesto called Restoring the Natural Order: an Agenda for Europe.

The first summit was held in Fürstenried Castle, outside Munich in 2014. David Quinn attended and gave a talk on opposition to same-sex marriage. In 2015, the summit was held in Dublin where Iona directors David Quinn and Tom Finegan presented a talk on the Irish same-sex marriage referendum which occurred early that year. In 2016, the summit was held in Warsaw were Quinn moderated discussions regarding hate speech and the "politicisation" of human rights.

The summits were attended by Luca Volontè, founder of the Novae Terrae Foundation which was accused, and eventually acquitted, of money-laundering and funneling Russian-Azerbaijani funds into various right-wing religious groups in Europe, including Iona. In January 2021, Volontè was sentenced to four years in prison and a fine of €500,000 for taking bribes from Azerbaijani politicians.

He was acquitted in 2022 of money laundering by the Court of Milan; which also acquitted him of corruption due to the expiry of the statute of limitations although the fine imposed by the court still stands.

== Campaign issues ==
=== Marriage ===
==== Same-sex marriage ====
The Iona Institute promotes heterosexual marriage and opposes the extension of the right to marry to same-sex couples. The group previously opposed the introduction of civil partnerships. The group says that children do best when raised by a mother and father, citing a study by Douglas Allen and others published in the journal Demography in 2012. This position has been challenged by groups such as the American Psychological Association, whose stated position is that "the evidence to date suggests that home environments provided by lesbian and gay parents are as likely as those provided by heterosexual parents to support and enable children's psychosocial growth". The Iona Institute has been accused of misrepresenting the research which underpins its position opposing same-sex marriage. The group was also criticised for invalid interpretations of data to back its claims.

In December 2012 the group released a video on YouTube saying that marriage can only be between a man and a woman and that blocking gay couples from marriage was not discrimination. The video gained notoriety after the institute's YouTube account was temporarily suspended. Its director, David Quinn, alleged censorship. The video was subsequently parodied by activists in favour of same-sex marriage.

On 13 May 2015, in the run up to Ireland's same-sex marriage referendum held on 22 May 2015, Irish historian John A Murphy, wrote to The Irish Times. In his letter, he described the constitutional amendment, which permitted same sex marriage and extended constitutional protection to families based on such marriages, as "grotesque nonsense." Following this, Iona director David Quinn tweeted "Proposed change to marriage 'grotesque nonsense'. ...Great letter by Prof John A Murphy in @IrishTimes today." Quinn was criticised for this tweet by LGBT rights activist Panti, who wrote: "I can think of lots of things that are grotesque. Extending constitutional protection to all families is not one of them. ...I would call it 'fair', 'reasonable', 'compassionate', 'considerate', 'respectful', or even 'the very least we can do'. But not 'grotesque.'"

==== Marital breakdown claims ====
An Iona Institute report called "The Fragmenting Family" drew heavily on data from the 2006 census and said that between 1986 and 2006 marital breakdown in Ireland rose by 500%. However, the report was criticised by Fergus Finlay because it used figures from the 1986 census (before divorce was legalised in Ireland), and that the figures actually suggest that marriage breakdown had been slowing down since the 1990s. A 2010 report by the Economic and Social Research Institute (ESRI) states that "[t]he evidence suggests no significant upward shift in marital breakdown as a result of the advent of divorce in 1997".

==== Submission to the Constitutional Convention ====
In its submission to the Constitutional Convention, in opposition to same-sex marriage, the group cited a 2002 study conducted by the American non-governmental organisation Child Trends. In its submission, the organisation summarised the report stating that "Research clearly demonstrates that family structure matters for children, and the family structure that helps the most is a family headed by two biological parents in a low-conflict marriage...". Issues were subsequently raised in the Irish Senate as to the accuracy of the report and a response by Carol Emig, president of Child Trends, wrote to the convention and stated that "This Child Trends brief summarizes research conducted prior to 2002, when neither same-sex parents nor adopted parents were identified in large national surveys. Therefore, no conclusions can be drawn from this research about the well-being of children raised by same-sex partners or adoptive parents."

==== Tax ====
In 2007 the Institute issued a policy document entitled Tax Individualisation: Time for a Critical Treatment which criticised the government's policy of tax individualisation for married couples as favoring women who choose to work over those who stay at home. The document was launched by Joan Burton TD, who was the then finance spokesperson for the Labour Party. The document claimed that families where only one parent stayed at home were discriminated against by the current tax individualisation policy.

In May 2011, the group hosted a conference entitled "Women, home and work: Towards a policy that's fair to all families", which highlighted the social policies that it says unfairly discriminate in favour of working women over mothers who wish to spend some or all of their working lives at home with their children.

=== Denominational schools ===
In March 2009, the organisation commissioned a survey by polling company Red C which showed that only 47% of the population wished to send their children to a Roman Catholic school.

=== Religious freedom and discrimination against gays and atheists ===
At an April 2008 conference, the Iona Institute highlighted a posited move by the European Union, which would require Ireland to scrap Section 37 of the Employment Equality Act 2000. Section 37 allows government-funded religious schools and hospitals to discriminate against any employee on any basis except gender if having the employee is "undermining the religious ethos" of the institution. David Quinn, the director of the institute, said that removing the discrimination exemption "could impact very severely on the freedom of action of faith-based schools". This section has been opposed by the Irish National Teachers' Organisation since its introduction.

The Iona institute also believes that employees should not be required to act against their Catholic beliefs by employers. For example, in April 2010, the group supported the stance taken by Dr Phil Boyle, a fertility doctor based in Galway and husband of Iona director Evana Boyle, who would only provide fertility treatment to married couples because of his Catholic beliefs.

=== Climate change ===
In September 2019, David Quinn and Maria Steen wrote opinion pieces in national newspapers questioning climate change activists and their refusal to consider the economic impacts of climate change activism on its own. Steen compared some activists to a pagan cult.

=== Low national birth rate ===
The institute is concerned about the low national birth rate. It quotes statistics showing that it has gone below replacement rate: "The Irish Fiscal Advisory Council came up with a report a few days ago, showing that by mid-century 2050 – so 30 years into the future – the number of retired people would have doubled from 14 per cent of the population to 27 per cent. And so you have a diminishing percentage of young people having to look after – through tax and through other things – a fast increasing number of retired people. That's something to be looked at incredibly closely." David Quinn stated that the solution to Ireland's skewed age ratio is to "help people to have the number of children they want".

== Reception and impact ==
In an article in The Irish Times by Kathy Sheridan on same-sex marriage, the group was described as being "blessed with extremely high-profile members with priceless multimedia platforms" and "'very, very engaged' with politicians".

In an interview in Hot Press magazine, comedian Graham Norton said "I'm actually glad ... the Iona Institute exists. The great thing about extremists is that they drag everyone towards the centre."

In August 2022, the Global Project against Hate and Extremism published a report on the growth of far-right and hate groups in Ireland. The report stated that "white nationalist, anti-LGBTQ+, anti-immigrant, and anti-lockdown groups seem to be coming together and echoing each other's hateful rhetoric" and identified twelve far-right groups, including the Iona Institute, that had experienced growth in recent years. The Iona Institute was included due to its anti-LGBT+ stances.

On 16 September 2025, a package containing white powder—claimed by the sender to be anthrax—was sent to the Iona Institute. The organisation's CEO, David Quinn, stated that it was "just addressed 'Iona Institute', so it's basically targeting me and Breda O'Brien". A hand written note accompanying the powder read: "Happy Anthrax. To David Quinn and Bit*h O'Brien (sic)". The building was evacuated and the Army's bomb squad secured the area. Gardaí launched an investigation, while Quinn suggested that the person responsible might be "somebody with a hang-up about the Catholic Church".

== RTÉ payment controversy (a.k.a. "Pantigate") ==
On 11 January 2014, the Iona Institute said it was defamed when accused of homophobia by the performer and gay rights activist Rory O'Neill in an interview on the RTÉ Saturday Night Show. A payment of roughly €85,000 was made by RTÉ to the Iona Institute and John Waters as part of an out of court agreement. All the litigants from the Iona Institute rejected a right of reply in favour of the payment. Breda O'Brien described a right of reply offer as "completely inadequate". RTÉ's TV director said "Senior counsel was consulted and confirmed that the legal position was far from clear."

The payment caused a controversy, with the Minister for Communications, Pat Rabbitte, and Senators David Norris and Ivana Bacik demanding the reasoning for the payment and in the region of 2000 people attended a protest at the payment. Senator Averil Power said seeking "to completely censor somebody else's viewpoint by resorting to solicitors' letters is ridiculous". MEP Paul Murphy said RTÉ's actions were censorship, and further described it as a "real attack on the freedom of speech". Senator Rónán Mullen said that the payments by RTÉ "were a welcome development in the cause of promoting a civil debate."

In a Dáil discussion on the issue, TDs, John Lyons, Jerry Buttimer, Michael Colreavy, Clare Daly, Luke Flanagan, Mick Wallace and Catherine Murphy also criticised the payment. Then-Taoiseach Enda Kenny said to Buttimer that he had no plans to make RTÉ "directly accountable" to the Dáil over the payments. The Index on Censorship commented on the incident, saying "If the Catholic right was more confident in its arguments, it wouldn't attempt to censor the other side".

== See also ==
- Anti-abortion movements
- Christian right
- Opposition to LGBTQ rights
- Pro Life Campaign
- Youth Defence
