= Azerbaijani laundromat =

Money laundering scheme

The Azerbaijani laundromat is a complex money-laundering scheme organized by the Republic of Azerbaijan that was revealed by the Organized Crime and Corruption Reporting Project (OCCRP) in September 2017. The investigations exposed that from 2012 to 2014 about US $2.9 billion was siphoned through European companies and banks. The money was used to pay off Western politicians in an attempt to whitewash Azerbaijan's reputation abroad.

== Media investigation ==
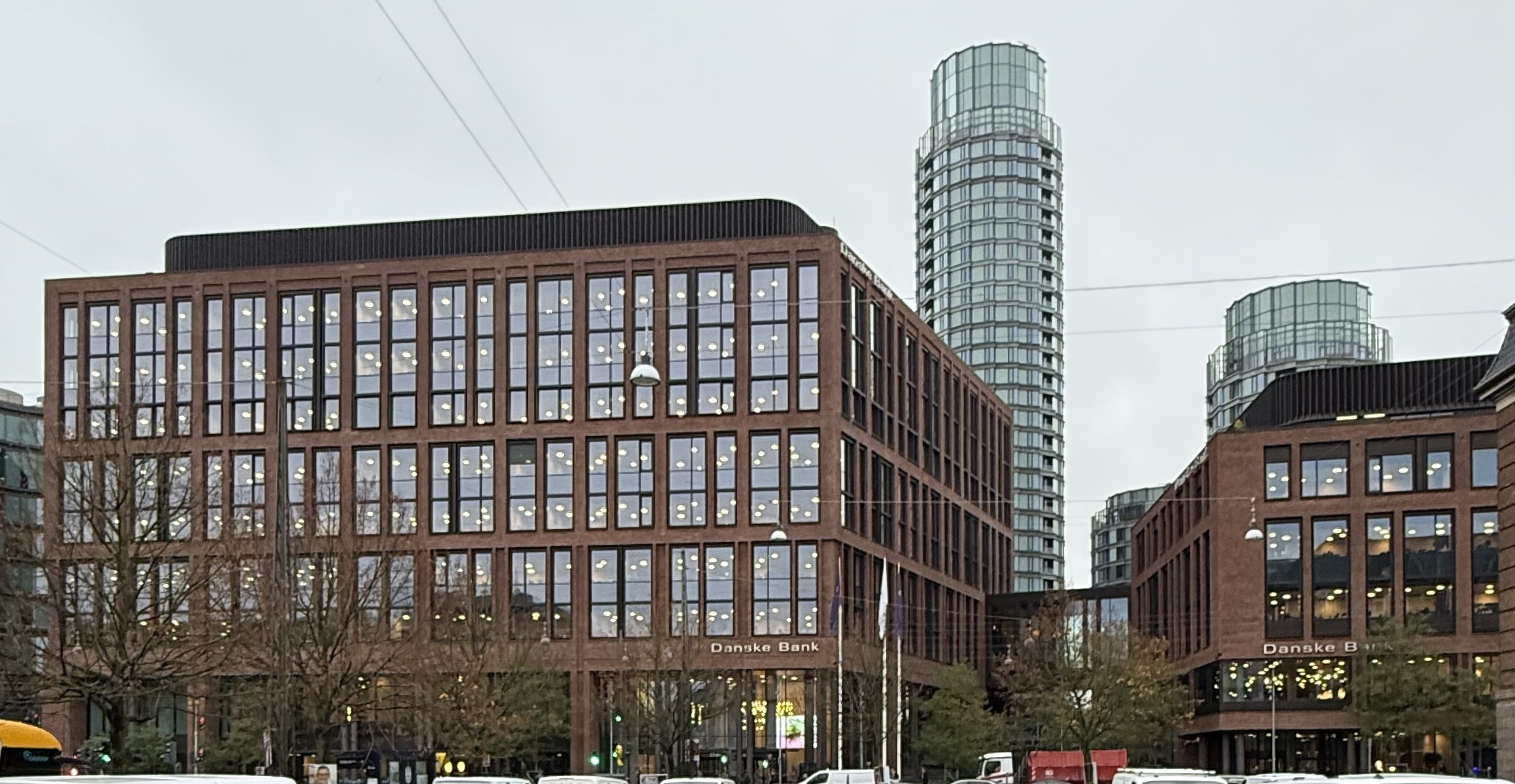
A Danske Bank (pictured here its head office) branch in Estonia was central in transmitting the laundered money.

The scheme was uncovered through a joint investigation by OCCRP, Berlingske (Denmark), The Guardian (UK), Süddeutsche Zeitung (Germany), Le Monde (France), Tages-Anzeiger and Tribune de Genève (Switzerland), De Tijd (Belgium), Novaya Gazeta (Russia), Dossier (Austria), Atlatszo (Hungary), Delo (Slovenia), RISE Project (Romania), Bivol (Bulgaria), Aripaev (Estonia), Czech Center for Investigative Journalism (Czech Republic), and Barron's (US), which published a series of articles revealing the results of their investigations in September 2017. In 2018 OCCRP published 2 more investigative reports suggesting Azerbaijani Laundromat was also used to influence US government bodies and policy in favour of Azerbaijan.

Internal bank documents detailing over 16,000 transactions between 2012 and 2014 were initially obtained through a leak by Berlingske Danish newspaper and then shared with their media partners. The analysed documents revealed a large number of obscure transactions indirectly linked to "influential persons" in Azerbaijan that mainly used four UK-based shell companies and the Danske Bank branch in Estonia to transfer millions to accounts of companies and individuals across the world. The scheme allowed Azerbaijan's ruling elite to funnel out at least $2.9 billion to purportedly buy silence on human rights violations in Azerbaijan, promote Azeri government views and create a positive image of Azerbaijan abroad.

This was Berlingske's first sizeable international cooperative investigation. It had a major impact in Denmark due to Danske Bank's implication in the scheme. Danish Prime Minister Lars Løkke Rasmussen reacted to the stories publicly, telling Denmark's TV2: "It makes me sad and angry."

== Laundered money ==
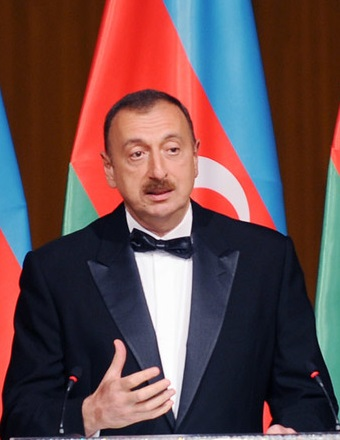
Ilham Aliyev in 2012

Almost half of the money ($1,452,918,429) came from an account held in the International Bank of Azerbaijan (IBA) by a shell company linked to the Aliyev family, $8.5 million came directly from government ministries and organisations such as the MODIAR, Ministry of Emergency Situations, Special State Protection Service. Some of the money came from companies with ties to the regime like Baktelekom MMC, connected to former minister Goknur Baki, Azarbaycan Metanol Kompani, Arash Medical Production and offshore entities. Another portion came from Rosoboronexport – a state-owned Russian arms exporter. The recipients also included prominent Azerbaijanis with government positions or connections, like the family of Yaqub Eyyubov – Azerbaijan's first deputy prime minister, Ali Nagiyev – a government representative responsible for battling corruption and Orkhan Sultanov – head of foreign intelligence of Azerbaijan.

The four front companies at the centre of the scheme (Metastar Invest, Hilux Services, Polux Management and LCM Alliance) were all limited partnerships registered in the UK. Their corporate partners were anonymous tax haven entities based in the British Virgin Islands, Seychelles and Belize. Danske Bank handled the accounts of all four laundromat companies, allowing the billions to pass through its Estonian branch without due investigation into the provenance of the funds.

A majority of the payments went to shell companies in the UK. Large amounts also went to companies in the UAE and Turkey to accounts and companies that were also implicated in the Russian Laundromat uncovered previously by the OCCRP, thus revealing a connection between the two money laundering schemes. Both "laundromats" (a term coined by OCCRP to refer to a vast money-laundering scheme) have used the same type of British-based limited partnerships, share the same formation agents and some of the same bank accounts, in addition 33 of the companies used in the Azerbaijani scheme also appear in the Russian version, indicating that the full extent of the scheme may be much larger and needs further investigations to uncover its full extent.

Later the OCCRP report also revealed a series of transfers from two Azerbaijani Laundromat shell companies to a Baku-based organization called Renaissance Associates, which, in turn, engaged a US lobbying firm "to orchestrate praise for Azerbaijan and had its representatives make thousands of dollars in campaign donations, including to Senators and Representatives who sat on committees that determine foreign aid budgets".

== Sociopolitical implications ==
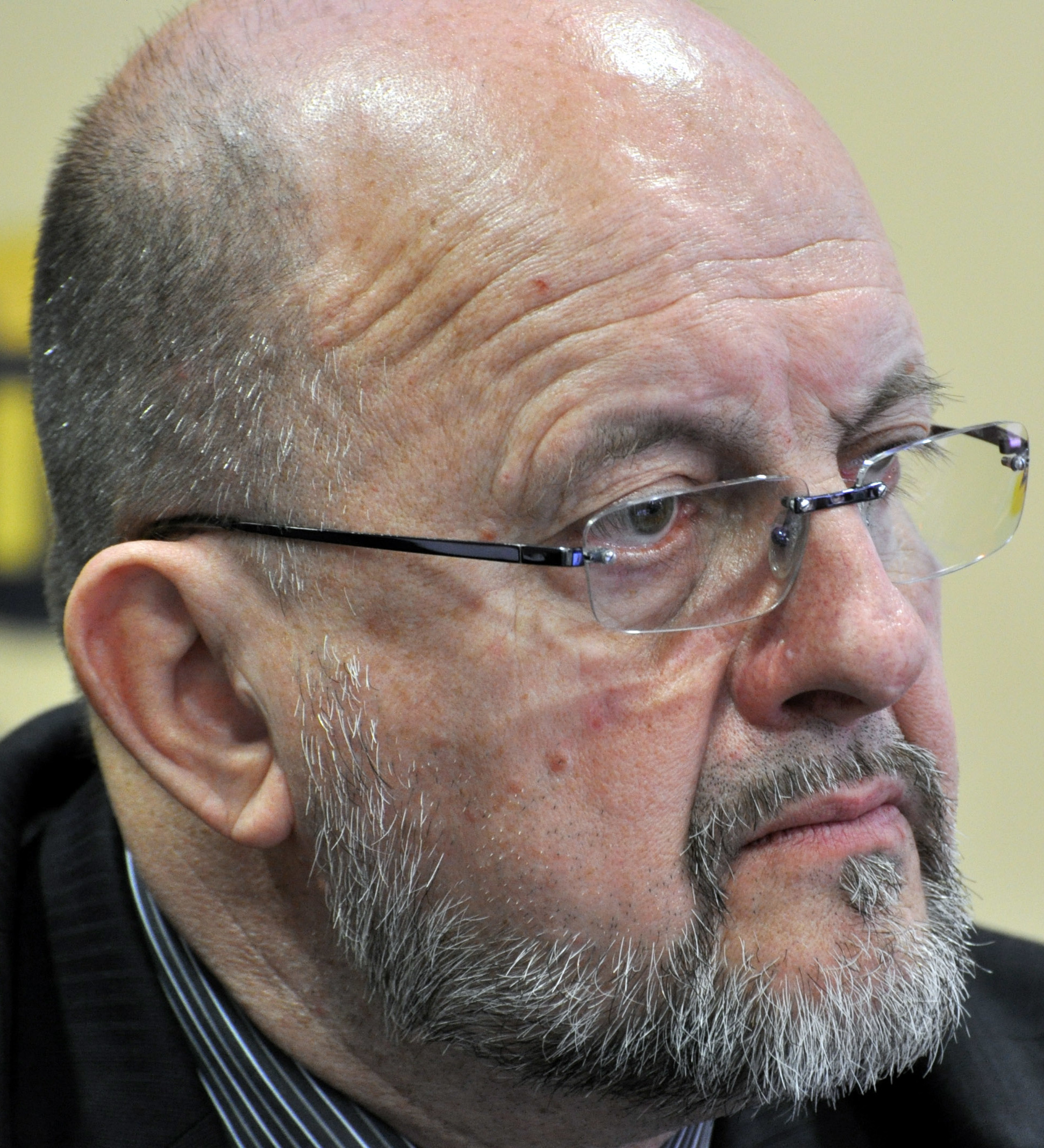
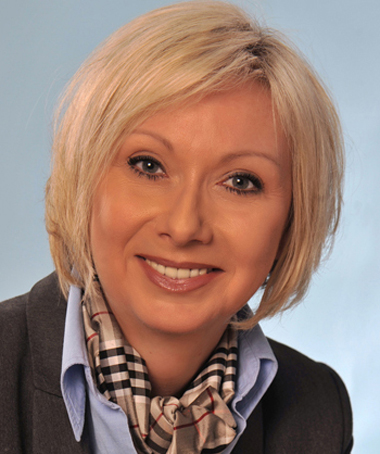
Slovenian politician Zmago Jelinčič Plemeniti (left) and German Bundestag member Karin Strenz (right) were among the laundered money recipients.

During the period of the money laundering activities, the Azerbaijani government imprisoned more than 90 human rights activists, opposition politicians, and journalists (such as Khadija Ismayilova, Anar Mammadli, Intiqam Aliyev, Rasul Jafarov, Leyla Yunus) on politically motivated charges. While this human rights crackdown was roundly condemned by international human rights groups, several European politicians, who were among the recipients of the laundromat payments, were able to mobilize important international organizations, such as the Parliamentary Assembly of the Council of Europe (PACE) and allegedly UNESCO, to silence criticism or score PR victories for the Azerbaijani government.

The revelations confirmed some of the earlier reports on the corruption of European diplomats by Azerbaijani officials uncovered by the European Stability Initiative in 2012 since some of the money recipients, such as Eduard Lintner (German politician and election monitor in European Parliament), Alain Destexhe (Belgian politician and member of PACE), Luca Volontè (Italian politician and member of PACE) and others were already implicated in the "Caviar diplomacy" investigation.

Other recipients included: Kalin Mitrev (member of the board of EBRD and married to Irina Bokova – head of UNESCO), Zmago Jelincic Pleminiti (Slovenian politician and presidential candidate), and Karin Strentz (Bundestag member – CDU).

Money was also shuffled to sports stars, media moguls, musicians and journalists to bolster the image of Azerbaijan. Eckart Sager, a former CNN journalist who wrote articles friendly to the Azerbaijani regime was among the recipients.

OCCRP reports also exposed Adil Baguirov (an Azerbaijani businessman based in Dayton, Ohio) as "Baku's Man in America" claiming that Baguirov received $253,150 months after his non-profit organisation held a conference in Baku in 2013 that was attended by 10 members of the US Congress, most of who spoke favourably about Azerbaijan after their return to the US. As reported by OCCRP, Baguirov also helped organise other US-Azeri conferences in Washington, repeatedly testified before the House in favour of US military aid to Azerbaijan, served as the coordinator of the Congressional Azerbaijan Caucus, and worked prominently in a Houston-based company, which organized a trip by the Azerbaijani President to the White House. The investigation stated that Baguirov and his father served in numerous advisory roles to the Azerbaijani and Russian governments respectively and that "Baguirov did all this while holding American, Azerbaijani, and, it also appears, Russian citizenship until at least 2005".

== Reaction and criminal probes ==
=== Azerbaijan ===
Thousands of protesters took to the streets in Baku under the slogan "Return the money stolen from the people", to demonstrate against corruption and tax fraud committed by the country's governing elite.

=== Bulgaria ===
In September 2017, the public prosecutor's office launched an inquiry into Kalin Mitrev, Bulgaria's representative to the EBRD, who received €425,000 from the laundromat scheme. Mitrev denied wrongdoing and said the payments to his Swiss and Bulgarian accounts were for legitimate consultancy work, and which had happened before he joined the bank's board in London. In September 2018, Bulgarian prosecutors declared that the investigation and an audit of Mitrev's tax affairs from 2012 to 2015 had uncovered no evidence of tax evasion, money laundering, "nor any discrepancy between the property of the taxpayer, the expenses incurred by him, and his income".

=== Denmark ===
The Azerbaijani and Russian Laundromat revelations led to what became known as the Danske Bank money laundering scandal, described as possibly the largest money laundering scandal ever in Europe. In the immediate aftermath of the Berlingske publications, Danske Bank launched an internal investigation into its Estonian branch activities. In September 2018, when the results of the investigation were released, the CEO of the bank Thomas Borgen stepped down. In May of the same year, Danish prosecutors charged him with neglecting his responsibilities. Charges were also brought against Henrik Ramlau-Hansen, the bank's former chairman of the Financial Supervisory Authority, for failing to prevent the suspicious transactions.

The Danish Parliament introduced more stringent anti-money laundering measures, increasing penalties for money laundering eight-fold, making them some of the toughest in Europe.

=== Estonia ===
The Estonian authorities launched a probe into the matter as well and arrested 10 former employees of Danske Bank in December 2018. The bank was required to close its Estonian branch in 2019 by the Estonian government.

=== Council of Europe ===
In January 2017, following a series of critical reports and concerns expressed by many members of the Parliamentary Assembly of the Council of Europe (PACE), the Assembly's Bureau decided to set up an independent, external body to investigate allegations of corruption in PACE. The investigation body's final report was published in April 2018, finding "strong suspicions of corruptive conduct involving members of the Assembly" and naming a number of members and former members as having breached the Assembly's Code of Conduct. Many of the members or former members mentioned in the report were sanctioned: four members were deprived of certain rights and 14 members, accused of accepting gifts and bribes from the government of Azerbaijan, were expelled from the Assembly's premises for life.

In March 2019, the PACE Committee on Legal Affairs and Human Rights issued a new report with recommendations titled "Laundromats: responding to new challenges in the international fight against organised crime, corruption and money laundering".

=== Germany ===
In July 2018, the PACE decided to expel the Member of the German Bundestag Karin Strenz and also the former CSU politician Eduard Lintner from its buildings for life. In January 2019, the leadership of the Bundestag disciplined Strenz for breaking parliamentary rules on declaring external income received from Azerbaijan. In January 2020, the public prosecutor's office in Frankfurt launched an investigation into both Strenz and Lintner. The Bundestag waived Strenz's immunity and approved the execution of judicial searches and seizure orders to investigate Strenz for receiving money from a company lobbying for Azerbaijan and owned by Lintner. The Federal Criminal Police searched the parliamentary office and the apartments of Strenz. At the request of the German court, investigators also searched Belgian ex-MR-politician Alain Destexhe's and Stef Goris's' apartments.

In March 2021 Strenz fell unconscious during an international flight and died at the age of 53.

In March 2021, the Munich Public Prosecutor's Office launched an investigation on the initial suspicion of corruption against another CDU MP Axel Fischer. The Bundestag lifted his immunity and the BKA searched his representative office. In January 2024 prosecutors brought bribery and corruption charges also against Axel Fischer and Eduard Lintner.

In July 2025 Eduard Lintner was convicted for bribing officials on behalf of Azerbaijan, sentencing him to a suspended prison term of 9 months. The husband of deceased Karin Strenz was ordered to repay €111,000 and proceedings against Axel Fischer were separated to proceed further. The verdict shows that there was systematic bribery of parliamentarians by Azerbaijan, the corruption was extensively planned and organized and dozens of other parliamentarians and former parliamentarians were involved.

In January 2026 the court found Alex Fischer guilty and sentencend him to one and a half years, giving him a suspended sentence. Additionally, he was banned from running in elections for two years.

In October 2026 former BND chief August Hanning, known for his ties to Azerbaijani influence networks in Germany, including the Deutsch-Aserbaidschanisches Forum, came under investigation on suspicion of espionage and using confidential BND information for a foreign intelligence service. Investigators suspect a connection to Azerbaijani intelligence and an Azerbaijani agent.

=== Hungary ===
The investigation revealed several bank transfers in 2012, totalling more than USD 9 million, made to the Hungarian MKB Bank account in Budapest right around the time when, amid international controversy, the Hungarian government extradited the convicted Azeri axe-murderer Ramil Safarov to Azerbaijan. Several media outlets suggested a connection between Viktor Orbán's visit to Baku in June and the first instalment of $7.6 million transferred to the bank account in July, since by the end of August Safarov was handed over to Azerbaijan.

Hungary's foreign minister Péter Szijjártó said he hopes the "international and national inquiries into the stories uncover what exactly happened because as long as the truth is not known, all kinds of defamatory statements can be made by everyone without consequence. In the firmest possible way, I reject any inference or insinuation which make any inference or insinuation which make a connection between the Hungarian foreign policy decisions and the aforementioned international criminal actions."

=== Italy ===
The Milan prosecutor's office charged Luca Volontè, the former head of the European People's Party faction in the PACE, with corruption and money laundering. According to the Prosecutor's Office Volontè had received €2.39 million to organise support for Azerbaijani officials in the Council of Europe. In January 2021, the Court of Milan sentenced Luca Volontè to four years in prison for receiving bribes from Azerbaijani politicians.

=== Luxembourg ===
The President of the Luxembourg Chamber of Notaries, Martine Schaeffer was fined €70,000 after a guilty plea for ignoring Azerbaijan-related money laundering practices in May 2024. It was reported that she, along with Michelin-starred chef Léa Linster, had supported the activities of the Azerbaijani cultural association 'Karabah' in Luxembourg from 2010 to 2020, all the while ignoring repeated alerts from the public prosecutor's office about Azerbaijani money-laundering practices.

=== Sweden ===
In March 2019, Swedbank CEO Birgitte Bonnesen lost her job in connection with a money laundering scandal. In January 2022, Sweden's Economic Crime Authority charged her with gross fraud, enabling money laundering with references, among others, to the Russian and Azerbaijani Laundromats.

=== United Kingdom ===
The extensive use of UK limited partnerships both in the Azerbaijani and Russian Laundromats gave rise to criticism on how these entities were being regulated. As a result, the NCA started an investigation into the role of British LP/LLP companies in these schemes and in December 2018 the UK government unveiled a raft of measures to cut down on money laundering through British LLPs, increase transparency and tackle corruption.

In the course of a government crackdown on limited partnerships to fight UK money laundering, the NCA froze several bank accounts linked to the Azerbaijani laundromat.

Khalid Sharif – a senior partner with a London law firm – was fined £45,000 and £40,000 by the tribunal for "failing to carry out money-laundering checks and breaching his professional code" in a real-estate deal where the two daughters of the Azerbaijani president, Leyla and Arzu Aliyeva, sought to purchase a £59.5 million real estate property in London.

Izzat Khanim Javad (a cousin of Azerbaijani president Ilham Aliyev and a London DJ under the name Mikaela Jav) and her husband Suleyman Javadov agreed to forfeit £4 million in funds received from the Laundromat to the NCA. The settlement was not an admission of wrongdoing.

In November 2021, the NCA filed proceedings to freeze and seize £15 million in bank accounts belonging to the wife, son, and nephew of Javanshir Feyziyev, a high-ranking Azerbaijani politician. In January 2022, the NCA seized £5.6 million from accounts belonging to the Feyziyev family because the money came from the Azerbaijani laundromat scheme. In February 2024 UK authorities proceeded to also freeze 22 London properties belonging to Javanshir Feyziyev and his wife suspected to have been acquired with "proceeds of unlawful conduct".

=== United States ===
In May 2024, Democratic Congress Representative Henry Cuellar and his wife Imelda were indicted on money laundering, conspiracy, and bribery charges. As per the indictment, nearly $600,000 in bribes from Azerbaijan and a Mexican commercial bank were laundered into shell companies owned by Imelda from December 2014 through at least November 2021. The indictment also states that "Among other things, Cuellar agreed to influence legislation favorable to Azerbaijan and deliver a pro-Azerbaijan speech on the floor of the U.S. House."

After Cuellar's indictment, two political advisors he had worked with pled guilty to charges that they had conspired with Cuellar to launder more than $200,000 in bribes from a Mexican bank. An Azerbaijani woman living in Houston and working for a SOCAR affiliate also pleaded guilty to having acted "as an agent for Azerbaijan without registering with federal officials".

== See also ==
- Caviar diplomacy
- Danske Bank money laundering scandal
- Russian Laundromat
