= Abortion in the Republic of Ireland =

Abortion in Ireland is permitted in Ireland during the first twelve weeks of pregnancy, and later in cases where the pregnant woman's life or health is at risk and in cases of a fatal fetal abnormality.

Abortion services commenced on 1 January 2019 following its legalisation by the Health (Regulation of Termination of Pregnancy) Act 2018. This replaced a restrictive regime which had been required by the Eighth Amendment adopted in 1983, which inserted a clause into the Constitution of Ireland recognising the equal right to life of the unborn and the mother. In 2018, the Thirty-sixth Amendment replaced this clause with one permitting legislation on the termination of pregnancies.

Abortion had been prohibited in Ireland by the UK Offences against the Person Act 1861. The Eighth Amendment was added to the Constitution by referendum in 1983, after concerns that laws prohibiting abortion could be found to be unconstitutional based on a right to privacy. In 1992, the Supreme Court held in the X Case that a thirteen-year-old girl who had become pregnant as a result of rape could be permitted to obtain an abortion in the state because there was a risk to her life from suicide. There were unsuccessful constitutional referendums in 1992 and 2002 that aimed to preclude such grounds for abortion in future cases. Between 1 January 2014 and 31 December 2018, abortion in Ireland was regulated by the Protection of Life During Pregnancy Act 2013, under which abortion was illegal unless it occurred as the result of a medical intervention performed to save the life of the woman.

In 2012, Irish abortion law received worldwide attention on the death of Savita Halappanavar, who had been denied an abortion while suffering a septic miscarriage. This increased calls to repeal the Eighth Amendment. The constitutional and legislative provisions were discussed at a Citizens' Assembly in 2016–17, and at an Oireachtas committee in 2017, both of which recommended substantial reform and framed the debate of the referendum in May 2018.

== Current law ==
=== Constitutional provisions ===
Article 40.3.3° Provision may be made by law for the regulation of termination of pregnancy.

The current provision dates from the Thirty-sixth Amendment of the Constitution of Ireland, passed by referendum on 25 May 2018. For the previous constitutional provisions from 1983 to 2018, see the historical sections below.

=== Legislation ===
The Health (Regulation of Termination of Pregnancy) Act 2018 allows for a termination:

- under section 9, where there is a serious risk to the life of, or of serious harm to the health of, a pregnant woman, after examination by two medical practitioners;
- under section 10, in cases of emergency, where there is an immediate serious risk to the life of, or of serious harm to the health of a pregnant woman, after an examination by one medical practitioner;
- under section 11, where two medical practitioners are of the opinion formed in good faith that there is present a condition affecting the foetus that is likely to lead to the death of the foetus either before, or within 28 days of, birth; and
- under section 12, where there has been a certification that the pregnancy has not exceeded 12 weeks, and after a period of three days after this certification.

On commencement of the Health (Regulation of Termination of Pregnancy) Act, the Protection of Life During Pregnancy Act 2013 was repealed. Sections 7 and 8 of the 2013 Act provide for legal termination of pregnancies in cases of a risk of loss of life from physical illness, whereas section 9 provides for legal termination of pregnancies in cases of a risk of loss of life from suicide. Sections 58 and 59 of the Offences Against the Person Act 1861 were repealed, and effectively superseded by the offence defined in section 22 of intentionally destroying unborn human life, punishable by fourteen years' imprisonment.

==== Reproductive Rights (Amendment) Bill ====
In May 2026, the Social Democrats brought forward the Reproductive Rights (Amendment) Bill. The bill "would have abolished the three-day waiting period for an abortion, revised the criteria for a termination on the grounds of fatal foetal abnormality, and removed the criminal sanctions found in the current laws". The bill was defeated in the Dáil by 85 votes to 30. There were 36 abstentions.

== Irish abortions ==
=== Legal abortions in Ireland ===
Every year, the government publishes the number of notifications received of terminations performed under legislation. Those between 2014 and 2018 took place under the Protection of Life During Pregnancy Act 2013, with those taking place under the Health (Regulation of Termination of Pregnancy) Act 2018 being published from 2019:

Year	Number of notifications received
2014	26
2015	26
2016	25
2017	15
2018	32
2019	6,666
2020	6,577
2021	4,577
2022	8,156
2023	10,033
2024	10,852
2025	10,600

*: The government received just 4,577 notifications for abortions performed under the 2018 Act, but acknowledged that "the number of terminations of pregnancy notified to the Minister is substantially lower than the number of terminations carried out in 2021." The Department of Health estimated that 6,700 abortions under the 2018 Act were obtained in 2021, according reimbursements paid by the HSE. The disparity was blamed on COVID-19 and the HSE cyber attack.

=== Abortion pills ===
Between 2010 and 2012, 1,642 women ordered abortion pills over the Internet from Women on Web, and had an abortion at home, in Ireland. The pills were illegal in Ireland, and Customs occasionally seized shipments.

=== Traveling for an abortion ===
Estimates as to the number of Irish women seeking abortions in Britain vary. Since the passage of the Thirteenth Amendment (Travel) in 1992, the right to travel for an abortion has had constitutional protection. In 2016, 3,265 Irish women were recorded as having had abortions in Great Britain. In some cases, women traveling do so with the assistance of the Abortion Support Network.

In 1980, Marian Finucane won the Prix Italia for a documentary on abortion; she interviewed a woman who was about to have an abortion, had travelled with her to England, been with her in the hospital and talked to her afterwards. In 2001, an estimated 7,000 women travelled abroad to obtain an abortion. Statistics showed that 4,149 Irish women had abortions in Britain in 2011. A study published in Social & Legal Studies found that in 2014 a total of 5,521 women gave Irish addresses to English and Welsh clinics that provided abortion services. In years leading up to 2018, some Irish women had abortions in the Netherlands.

The issue of traveling to the UK for an abortion was relevant for many Irish abortion cases, such as the X Case in 1992, C Case in 1997 and the case of Miss D in 2007, as well as in the cases of fatal foetal abnormalities. In response to the UNHRC decision in Mellet v Ireland (2016), the government gave Amanda Mellet €30,000 compensation, partially for being forced to travel.

=== Abortion for minority groups ===
Despite the legalisation of abortion in Ireland following the 2018 repeal of the Eighth Amendment, access to services remains deeply unequal, with minority women bearing a disproportionate burden of the barriers that persist. Geographic inequity is a foundational problem: with only around one in ten GPs contracted to provide abortion services, and those providers concentrated in urban centres, women in rural areas — particularly asylum seekers living in isolated Direct Provision centres with poor public transport links — face significant practical obstacles. These structural barriers compound existing experiences of discrimination: research by the National Traveller Women's Forum found that over two-thirds of service providers acknowledged that discrimination against Traveller women occurs in health settings. Migrant women and asylum seekers face a distinct set of compounding disadvantages, including the requirement for an Irish address and PPS number, difficulties securing translation services — which in documented cases extended waiting times by several days beyond the mandatory three-day period — and restrictions on travel arising from immigration or dependent status. That women from Black, Asian, and Chinese backgrounds with Irish addresses are significantly over-represented among those travelling to Britain for abortion care points to particular, unresolved barriers facing racialised minority women within the Irish system. Disabled women face additional layers of exclusion, including inaccessible information, physical and communication barriers, and an inadequate transport infrastructure). As the geographer Sydney Calkin argues, a system genuinely designed with the most marginalised in mind — attending to barriers of transport, immigration status, and access to support — would look fundamentally different from the one currently in place.

== History of abortion in Ireland ==
=== Offences against the Person Act 1861 ===
Under sections 58 and 59 of the Offences against the Person Act 1861, as amended by the Statute Law Revision Act 1892 and Statute Law Revision (No. 2) Act 1893, procuring a miscarriage was a criminal offence subject to penal servitude for life.

58. Every woman, being with child, who, with intent to procure her own miscarriage, shall unlawfully administer to herself any poison or other noxious thing, or shall unlawfully use any instrument or other means whatsoever with the like intent, and whosoever, with intent to procure the miscarriage of any woman, whether she be or be not with child, shall unlawfully administer to her or cause to be taken by her any poison or other noxious thing, or shall unlawfully use any instrument or other means whatsoever with the like intent, shall be guilty of felony, and being convicted thereof shall be liable ... to be kept in penal servitude for life ...
59. Whosoever shall unlawfully supply or procure any poison or other noxious thing, or any instrument or thing whatsoever, knowing that the same is intended to be unlawfully used or employed with intent to procure the miscarriage of any woman, whether she be or be not with child, shall be guilty of a misdemeanor, and being convicted thereof shall be liable … to be kept in penal servitude ...

These provisions enacted by the Parliament of the United Kingdom remained in force in Irish law until they were repealed by the Protection of Life During Pregnancy Act 2013.

=== Early twentieth century ===
Fears were expressed by politicians in 1929 of an increase in criminal abortions and infanticide following the passing of the Criminal Law Amendment Act which prohibited all appliances and substances for contraception; no exceptions whatsoever were made. Over 100 Irish women were dying annually from unsafe backstreet abortions in the 1930s.

The English case of Rex v Bourne (1938), which allowed the distress of a pregnant girl as a defence in a prosecution against a doctor for the termination of a pregnancy, led to an increase in abortion in Britain, and thereafter, of Irish women traveling to obtain abortions. There were no prosecutions in Ireland for illegal abortions between 1938 and 1942 but as a result of travel restrictions imposed during the war years, there were 25 cases prosecuted between 1942 and 1946. During the late 1930s and early 1940s, up to 400 terminations (both legal and illegal) were performed daily in England and Wales, and given the high emigration rates it is likely that there was widespread knowledge of the possibility of obtaining backstreet abortions in England by Irish people. The Bell magazine in 1941 said that some young women from well-off backgrounds were "hustled off, normally to London, Paris, Biarritz, comes back without the baby and nobody is any the wiser" After the war the level of prosecutions decreased, though this only relates to abortions that went wrong or were found out. Those found guilty were dealt with severely by the courts, receiving long sentences of penal servitude, with one chemist with an extensive abortion practice in Merrion Square, Dublin in 1944 receiving a 15-year sentence that was reduced to 7 years on appeal. The Garda Commissioner's first annual report on crime published in 1947 made reference to the number of abortions that were performed illegally. In the 1950s novels, autobiographies and works of non-fiction (including medical texts) that promoted or even described abortion were banned. There were extremely few prosecutions for performing illegal abortion between 1952 and 1963, but one of Ireland's best-known abortion providers, Mamie Cadden, was sentenced to death by hanging in 1957 – this was later commuted to life imprisonment – when one of her patients died.

The Abortion Act 1967 in Great Britain made access to the treatment easier for Irish women and the instance of infanticide, which was prevalent, began to decline sharply. In 1974 Noël Browne became the first member of the Oireachtas to propose the provision of therapeutic abortion services during a contribution to a Seanad debate. In 1981, Mary McAleese (later president of Ireland), chaired a meeting at Liberty Hall that advocated a woman's right to choose. She later claimed that she misunderstood the nature of the meeting. McAleese had previously said that "I would see the failure to provide abortion as a human rights issue", but also that she did not feel "that the way to cope with it is through introducing abortion legislation" into Ireland. A number of controversies have arisen following deaths of pregnant women who were prevented from receiving medical care because of their pregnancy, such as Sheila Hodgers in 1983. Sheila Hodgers, a woman from Dundalk, County Louth, died in 1983 of multiple cancers two days after giving birth to her third child, who died at birth. It is alleged that she was denied treatments for her cancer while pregnant because the hospital did not wish to harm the foetus because of its Catholic ethos.

=== Eighth Amendment ===
The Pro-Life Amendment Campaign (PLAC) was founded in 1981 to campaign against the possibility of a judicial ruling in Ireland that would allow abortion. Prior to the 1981 general election, PLAC lobbied the major Irish political parties – Fianna Fáil, Fine Gael and the Labour Party – to urge the introduction of a Bill to allow the amendment to the constitution to prevent the Supreme Court interpreting the constitution as giving a right to abortion. The leaders of the three parties – respectively Charles Haughey, Garret FitzGerald and Frank Cluskey – agreed although there was little consultation with any of their parties' ordinary members. All three parties were in government over the following eighteen months but it was only in late 1982, just before the collapse of a Fianna Fáil minority government, that a proposed wording for the amendment was proposed. After the election, on the advice of Attorney General Peter Sutherland, the new government of Fine Gael and Labour proposed an alternative wording but there was not a majority in the Dáil for it, and the wording proposed by Fianna Fáil was accepted. This inserted the following subsection into the Constitution:

Article 40.3.3° The State acknowledges the right to life of the unborn and, with due regard to the equal right to life of the mother, guarantees in its laws to respect, and, as far as practicable, by its laws to defend and vindicate that right.

The Eighth Amendment of the Constitution of Ireland was put to a referendum on 7 September 1983 and was approved with 66.9% of the vote.

Protests took place in Ireland in the years leading up to 2018 to remove the Eighth Amendment. The government set an indicative timescale of early summer 2018 for a referendum on the section of the state's constitution that ensures tight legal restrictions on terminations.

=== Abortion information ===
In the 1980s the Society for the Protection of Unborn Children challenged distribution of information relating to abortion services in Britain under the provisions of Article 40.3.3°. In proceedings which they initiated, which were later converted into the name of the Attorney General, AG (SPUC) v Open Door Counselling Ltd. and Dublin Wellwoman Centre Ltd. (1988), the High Court granted an injunction restraining two counselling agencies from assisting women to travel abroad to obtain abortions or informing them of the methods of communications with such clinics. SPUC v Grogan and SPUC v Coogan targeted students' unions, seeking to prohibit them from distributing information on abortion available in the UK.

In response to the success of this litigation, and prompted by the controversy on the X Case, a referendum was held in November 1992 on the Fourteenth Amendment, which passed. The Fourteenth Amendment specified that the prohibition of abortion would not limit the right to distribute information about abortion services in foreign countries. This was governed by the Regulation of Information (Services Outside the State For Termination of Pregnancies) Act 1995. This was referred to the Supreme Court by President Mary Robinson and found to be constitutional. This Act was repealed on the commencement of the 2018 Act.

=== X Case and 1992 referendums ===
In 1992, in the X Case, the Attorney General sought an injunction to prevent a thirteen-year-old girl who had been the victim of rape from obtaining an abortion in England, which was granted in the High Court by Justice Declan Costello. On appeal to the Supreme Court, this decision was reversed, on the grounds that the girl was suicidal, and that, therefore, it was permissible to intervene to save her life.

In November 1992, the Twelfth Amendment of the Constitution Bill was proposed, which would have removed a risk of self-destruction as grounds for an abortion, but was defeated in a referendum.

The Thirteenth Amendment was passed in November 1992 in response to the injunction sought by the Attorney General, ensuring that the protection of the unborn in the constitution could not be used to prohibit travel from the state to another state for an abortion.

The Thirteenth and Fourteenth Amendments together added the following paragraphs to Article 40.3.3°:

This subsection shall not limit freedom to travel between the State and another state. This subsection shall not limit freedom to obtain or make available, in the State, subject to such conditions as may be laid down by law, information relating to services lawfully available in another state.

=== C Case ===
In August 1997 a 13-year-old girl was raped, and became pregnant. She was suicidal due to the pregnancy, and the High Court ruled in the C Case that the Eastern Health Board could arrange for her to travel to Britain for an abortion against the wishes of her parents.

The woman at the centre of the case has occasionally spoken about her experiences, but has not revealed her identity.

=== 2002 referendum ===
In 1999, as part of constitutional review, the Ahern government produced a 179-page green paper summarising the then-current Irish abortion law and held an All-party Oireactas Committee on the Constitution. It held oral submissions in 2000, producing a Fifth Progress Report: Abortion in November 2000. Following this, a referendum was held on the Twenty-fifth Amendment to the Constitution Bill, which would have introduced legislation into the constitution to permit abortion in cases of a threat to the life of a woman, but not in cases where there was a risk of suicide. This proposal was narrowly defeated (50.4% – 49.6%).

=== A, B and C v Ireland ===
In 2005, two Irish women and a Lithuanian woman who had previously travelled to England for abortion brought suit in the European Court of Human Rights (ECtHR) asserting that restrictive and unclear Irish laws violate several provisions of the European Convention on Human Rights (ECHR). The case, A, B and C v Ireland, was heard before the Grand Chamber of the Court on 9 December 2009 and was decided on 16 December 2010. The court ruled that the first two women's rights were not violated by being forced to travel because Irish law was "legitimately trying to protect public morals". The ECtHR also ruled that Irish law struck a fair balance between the women's rights to respect of their private lives and the rights of the unborn, although it found that Ireland had violated the ECHR by failing to provide an accessible and effective procedure by which a woman can have established whether she qualifies for a legal abortion under current Irish law. This pertained to the case of the woman who identified as C. Since she did not receive accurate information about the risks of pregnancy associated with her prognosis, she believed that she did not qualify for legal abortion in Ireland and was forced to travel to England for the procedure. In this case, the court relied on doctrine that would deny the direct challenge to Ireland's criminal law and this led to the reasoning that abortion is a moral issue. With the complex, lengthy and sensitive debate surrounding the issue, the Court made its ruling that state authorities were better suited than an international judge to balance the competing views and rights in abortion regulation. The Court's decision is binding on Ireland and all of the member states of the Council of Europe.

A government-appointed Expert Group on Abortion released its findings on 13 November 2012, the day before news of the death of Savita Halappanavar broke, saying that Ireland was obliged to implement the court's decision and recommending legislative and statutory reform. This led to the enactment of the Protection of Life During Pregnancy Act the following year.

=== Death of Savita Halappanavar ===
The death of Savita Halappanavar led to protests in 2012 calling for changes to Ireland's abortion laws and a highly public investigation by the Health Service Executive. After a miscarriage had been diagnosed, she was denied an abortion because the foetus's heart was still beating. She developed sepsis and died. The HSE enquiry found that her death was a result of inadequate assessment and monitoring and a failure to adhere to established clinical guidelines, and made several recommendations, including legislative and constitutional change.

=== Protection of Life During Pregnancy Act 2013 ===
The Protection of Life During Pregnancy Act 2013 was proposed by Minister for Health James Reilly on behalf of the Fine Gael–Labour Party government. It passed the Dáil by 127 votes to 31. Fine Gael, the Labour Party and Sinn Féin had a party whip in favour of the legislation, and among those who opposed it were Fine Gael TDs Lucinda Creighton, Terence Flanagan, Peter Mathews, Billy Timmins, and Brian Walsh, and Sinn Féin TD Peadar Tóibín. Brian Walsh and Peadar Tóibín were both returned to the party whip within the same Dáil term.

Sections 7 and 8 provided for legal termination of pregnancies in cases of a risk of loss of life from physical illness, whereas section 9 provided for legal termination of pregnancies in cases of a risk of loss of life from suicide. Sections 58 and 59 of the Offences Against the Person Act 1861 were repealed, and effectively superseded by the offence defined in section 22:

22. (1) It shall be an offence to intentionally destroy unborn human life.

(2) A person who is guilty of an offence under this section shall be liable on indictment to a fine or imprisonment for a term not exceeding 14 years, or both.

(3) A prosecution for an offence under this section may be brought only by or with the consent of the Director of Public Prosecutions.

Prior to this law, there was no standard to what conditions and situations would be considered to qualify for legal abortion in Ireland. This Act included a provision that allowed abortion only if there was a real and substantial risk to life, specifically pertaining to the life and health of the mother. Within this provision, the women seeking to qualify for legal abortion were examined by an obstetrician and a relevant specialist to decide if she qualified. In a case of a mother feeling suicidal or threatening to commit suicide, she was examined by three specialists and the agreement of their decision was required for her to obtain a legal abortion. If certification for a legal abortion was refused, a woman could appeal the decision and have her situation and conditions reviewed again.

President Michael D. Higgins convened the Council of State to consider the constitutionality of the Bill and a possible reference under Article 26 of the Constitution to the Supreme Court. The President decided against such a reference and signed the legislation into law on 30 July 2013.

In 2014, Ms Y, a young, suicidal refugee woman, was denied an abortion under the act. She went on hunger strike. The baby was eventually delivered by Caesarean section.

=== Cases of fatal foetal abnormality ===
In 2002, a woman pregnant with a foetus with fatal foetal abnormalities travelled to the UK for a termination. Her letter in The Irish Times was credited with playing a part in the defeat of the Twenty-fifth Amendment referendum. She later took a case against Ireland in the European Court of Human Rights, D v Ireland, which was ruled inadmissible. The State argued that the Constitution of Ireland might allow termination in cases of fatal foetal abnormalities. After the death of Savita Halappanavar, she gave up anonymity and spoke out. In May 2007 a 17-year-old girl, known as "Miss D", who was pregnant with a foetus suffering from anencephaly (the absence of a major portion of the brain, skull, and scalp; blind, deaf, unconscious, and unable to feel pain, a disorder which is invariably fatal), was prevented from travelling to Britain by the Health Service Executive. The High Court ruled on 9 May 2007 that she could not lawfully be prevented from travelling even though she was a ward of the state.

Amanda Mellet became pregnant in 2011; however, the foetus was suffering from Edwards syndrome, a fatal condition. She was unable to have an abortion in Ireland and had to travel to the UK. In 2016, she took a case to the United Nations Human Rights Committee, and in Mellet v Ireland it found that Ireland's abortion law violated the United Nations International Covenant on Civil and Political Rights and called for the law's reform. The Irish government paid her €30,000 in compensation.

In a case in 2010, the government of Ireland denied Siobhán Whelan an abortion despite being diagnosed with fatal foetal syndrome; she had to travel from Ireland to the UK to terminate her pregnancy. In June 2017, the United Nations Human Rights Committee ruled that Ireland's abortion law violated Whelan's human rights along with the International Covenant on Civil and Political Rights, subjecting Whelan to a cruel, inhumane and degrading treatment, and called for legalisation of and access to safe abortions. The ruling was praised by the Center for Reproductive Rights.

Abortion is currently permitted under the Health (Regulation of Termination of Pregnancy) Act 2018 where two medical practitioners are of the opinion formed in good faith that there is present a condition affecting the foetus that is likely to lead to the death of the foetus either before, or within 28 days of, birth.

=== Repeal of the Eighth Amendment ===
On 25 May 2018, the Irish people voted by 66.4% to 33.6% in a referendum to repeal the Eighth Amendment. They approved the Thirty-sixth Amendment of the Constitution Bill 2018 to delete the current provisions of Article 40.3.3° and replace it with the following:

3° Provision may be made by law for the regulation of termination of pregnancy.

The government also outlined policies which would govern legislation to replace the Protection of Life During Pregnancy Act 2013.

A Citizens' Assembly had been established by the government in 2016 to consider a number of issues. After five meetings on the Eighth Amendment, it voted to amend the constitution to allow the Oireachtas to legislate for abortion. It also voted on the provisions it would support in this legislation. The Report of the Assembly was sent to the Joint Oireachtas Committee on the Eighth Amendment of the Constitution. The Committee delivered its report in December 2017, and the report was debated in both Houses of the Oireachtas in January 2018.

The result of the referendum came after extensive social media campaigning coordinated the civil society organisation, Together For Yes. The influence of using social media as a voice of change reminded voters of how 'local' the abortion issue was in Ireland, allowing women the right to be heard openly on national media. Another strength of the 'feminist campaign' was the positioning of women from the private to the public sphere. By using social media to bring stories into the public, emotions were mobilised as a form of 'political resistance' to shed light on the potential damage a 'No' vote could cause.

Ultimately, 39 of the 40 constituencies voted in favour of repealing the Eight Amendment. The national result was:

Thirty-sixth Amendment of the Constitution Bill 2018
Choice	Votes	%
For	1,429,981	66.40
Against	723,632	33.60
Total	2,153,613	100.00
Valid votes	2,153,613	99.72
Invalid/blank votes	6,042	0.28
Total votes	2,159,655	100.00
Registered voters/turnout	3,367,556	64.13

A second draft of the Health (Regulation of Termination of Pregnancy) Bill was published by the Department of Health in July 2018.

=== Health (Regulation of Termination of Pregnancy) Act 2018 ===
The Health (Regulation of Termination of Pregnancy) Act 2018 defines the circumstances and processes within which abortion is legally performed in Ireland. It was signed by the President of Ireland on 20 December 2018, after being approved by both Houses of the Oireachtas, legalising abortion in Ireland. Abortion services commenced on 1 January 2019. This Act permits terminations to be carried out up to 12 weeks of pregnancy; or where there is a risk to the life, or of serious harm to the health, of the pregnant woman; or where there is a risk to the life, or of serious harm to the health, of the pregnant woman in an emergency; or where there is a condition present which is likely to lead to the death of the foetus either before or within 28 days of birth.

=== Mistaken cases of fatal foetal conditions ===
In March 2019, a woman in Dublin was told her baby was likely to have Edwards syndrome, considered a fatal foetal condition, following a positive non-invasive prenatal test (NIPT) and a positive chorionic villus sampling (CVS) diagnostic test, the mother opted for an amniocentesis, which did not show Edwards syndrome. She went on to give birth to a healthy baby without the condition.

In 2019, a woman attending the National Maternity Hospital was also given a diagnosis of Edwards syndrome. An abortion was carried out after 15 weeks. Following the abortion, genetic tests proved negative for Edwards syndrome, leaving the parents devastated and demanding an external investigation, which the hospital agreed to.

=== Pilots pressured into having abortions ===
According to the Irish Air Line Pilots' Association (IALPA), some female pilots of Irish registered airlines are under pressure to have an abortion if they become pregnant. The issue was highlighted as many Irish-registered airlines use pilots hired under self-employed contracts. Such pilots, as they are deemed to be self-employed, can lose out on work and pay if they become pregnant as they are not entitled to maternity leave.

=== GP abortion services ===
On 6 January 2019, it was reported that 200 GPs had registered to provide abortion services in Ireland. By the end of 2019, less than 15% of the GPs in Ireland had signed up to provide abortion services.

=== Access for migrants ===
Access to abortions remains precarious for migrants. People accessing state subsidised abortion are required to provide a Personal Public Service Number (PPSN), a unique number which allows access to a range of social welfare benefits and public services. This restrict abortion access for undocumented migrants (who do not qualify for PPSN), international students (who do not apply for a PPSN because they are self-funded), temporary migrants, or new migrants who are awaiting their PPSN. Migrants with limited knowledge of English frequently cannot get access to translation services; asylum seekers living in Direct Provision centres have to negotiate lack of privacy in this state-provided accommodation, and face additional obstacles in reaching abortion providers, including lack of public transport and lack of resources. Migrants are less likely to understand the range of healthcare options available to them and therefore more likely to lose out on access when met with conscientious objection from GPs.

== Referendums ==
Table of amendments and referendums relating to abortion
Proposal	Enactment date	Subject	Referendum date	Electorate	Total poll	(%) (Note: Total poll as a percentage of the electorate)	For	(%) (Note: As a percentage of the valid poll (total poll less spoilt votes))	Against	(%)	Spoilt	(%) (Note: Spoilt votes as a percentage of the total poll.)	Ref
8th Amendment	7 October 1983	Recognised the equal right to life of the unborn	7 September 1983	2,358,651	1,265,994	53.7	841,233	66.9	416,136	33.1	8,625	0.7	
	Gave constitutional recognition to the equal right to life of the unborn to entrench the statutory prohibition of abortion.												
12th Amendment Bill	N/A	Exclusion of suicide	25 November 1992	2,542,841	1,733,309	68.2	572,177	34.6	1,079,297	65.4	81,835	4.7	
	Proposed to prevent risk of suicide being invoked as grounds for an abortion.												
13th Amendment	23 December 1992	Right to travel	25 November 1992	2,542,841	1,733,821	68.2	1,035,308	62.4	624,059	37.6	74,454	4.3	
	Specified that the prohibition of abortion would not limit freedom of travel in and out of the state.												
14th Amendment	23 December 1992	Right to information	25 November 1992	2,542,841	1,732,433	68.1	992,833	59.9	665,106	40.1	74,494	4.3	
	Specified that the prohibition of abortion would not limit the right to distribute information about services in foreign countries.												
25th Amendment Bill	N/A	Exclusion of suicide	6 March 2002	2,923,918	1,254,175	42.9	618,485	49.6	629,041	50.4	6,649	0.5	
	Proposed to prevent risk of suicide being invoked as grounds for an abortion.												
36th Amendment	18 September 2018	Repeal of the 8th amendment	25 May 2018	3,367,556	2,159,655	64.13	1,429,981	66.40	723,632	33.60	6,042	0.3	
	Replaced the protection for life of the unborn with clause permitting legislation regulating the termination of pregnancy.												

== Public opinion ==
Several polls have been taken on the subject:

- A 1997 Irish Times/MRBI poll found that 18% believed that abortion should never be permitted, 77% believed that it should be allowed in certain circumstances (this was broken down into: 35% that one should be allowed in the event that the woman's life is threatened; 14% if her health is at risk; 28% that "an abortion should be provided to those who need it") and 5% were undecided.
- A September 2004 Royal College of Surgeons survey for the Crisis Pregnancy Agency found that, in the under-45 age groups, 51% supported abortion on-demand, with 39% favouring the right to abortion in limited circumstances. Only 8% felt that abortion should not be permitted in any circumstances.
- A September 2005 Irish Examiner/Lansdowne poll found that 36% believe abortion should be legalised while 47% do not.
- A June 2007 TNS/MRBI poll found that 43% supported legal abortion if a woman believed it was in her best interest while 51% remained opposed. 82% favoured legalisation for cases when the woman's life is in danger, 75% when the foetus cannot survive outside the womb, and 73% when the pregnancy has resulted from sexual abuse.
- A January 2010 Irish Examiner/RED C online poll found that 60% of 18- to 35-year-olds believe abortion should be legalised, and that 10% of this age group had been in a relationship where an abortion took place. The same survey also showed that 75% of women believed the morning-after pill should be an over-the-counter (OTC) drug, as opposed to a prescription drug.
- A September 2012 Sunday Times/Behaviour and Attitudes poll of 923 people showed that 80% of voters would support a change to the law to allow abortion where the life of the woman was at risk, with 16% opposed and 4% undecided.
- A November 2012 Sunday Business Post/RED C poll of 1,003 adults showed that 85% of voters would like the government to "Legislate for the X Case, which means allowing abortion where the mother's life is threatened, including by suicide", with 10% opposed and 5% undecided. The same poll also found that 82% of voters supported "A constitutional amendment to extend the right to abortion to all cases where the health of the mother is seriously threatened and also in cases of rape", and 36% of voters supported "A constitutional amendment to allow for legal abortion in any case where a woman requests it". In addition, 63% of voters also supported "A constitutional amendment to limit the X Case, by excluding a threat of suicide as a grounds for abortion, but still allowing abortion, where the mother's life is threatened outside of suicide".
- A January 2013 Paddy Power/RED C poll of 1,002 adults found that 29% of voters believed that there should be a constitutional amendment to allow abortion "in any case where the woman requests it". 35% supported legislating for the X Case allowing for abortions where the life of the mother is at risk, including from suicide. 26% supported legislating for the X Case but excluding suicide and 8% believed no legislation at all was necessary.
- A January 2013 Sunday Times/Behaviour and Attitudes poll of 916 voters found that 87% would support legislation to provide abortion where the woman's life was in danger for reasons other than threat of suicide, 80% would support legislation to provide abortion where there was a foetal abnormality meaning the baby could not survive outside of the womb, 74% would support legislation to provide abortion where the pregnancy was a result of rape, and 59% would support legislation to provide abortion where the woman displayed suicidal feelings. Overall, 92% supported allowing abortion in one of these four circumstances, while 51% supported allowing abortion in all four circumstances.
- A February 2013 Irish Times/Ipsos MRBI poll of 1,000 voters in face-to-face interviews in all constituencies found that 84% felt that abortion should be allowed when the woman's life is at risk, 79% felt that abortion should be allowed whenever the foetus cannot survive outside the womb, 78% felt that abortion should be allowed in cases of rape or incest, 71% felt that abortion should be allowed where the woman is suicidal as a result of the pregnancy (the X Case result), 70% felt that abortion should be allowed when the woman's health is at risk, and 37% felt that abortion should be provided when a woman deems it to be in her best interest.
- A June 2013 Irish Times/Ipsos MRBI poll of 1,000 voters in face-to-face interviews in all constituencies found that 75% were in favour of the government's proposed legislation (the Protection of Life during Pregnancy Bill 2013), with 14% opposed and 11% choosing "Don't know". Furthermore, 89% felt that abortion should be allowed when the woman's life is at risk, 83% felt that abortion should be allowed whenever the foetus cannot survive outside the womb, 81% felt that abortion should be allowed in cases of rape or abuse, 78% felt that abortion should be allowed when the woman's health is at risk, 52% felt that abortion should be allowed where the woman is suicidal as a result of the pregnancy, and 39% felt that abortion should be provided when a woman deems it to be in her best interest.
- A September 2014 Sunday Independent/Millward Brown poll found that 56% of voters were in favour of holding a referendum to repeal the Eighth Amendment to the Constitution, with 19% against and 25% undecided. In addition, 60% of voters were in favour of allowing abortion where there is a threat of the woman's suicide, 69% when the pregnancy arose as the result of rape, 72% when there is a risk to the woman's life (other than suicide) and 68% where there is a threat to the woman's long-term health. When it comes to allowing abortion "for other reasons", 34% are in favour, 38% opposed and 20% saying "it depends".
- A January 2016 Newstalk/RED C poll found that 78% of voters were in favour of allowing abortion in cases when the pregnancy arose as the result of rape or incest, 76% when there is a fatal foetal abnormality, 61% when there is a significant foetal disability or non-fatal foetal abnormality, 59% when the pregnant woman has suicidal feelings as a result of the pregnancy and 41% in any circumstances felt necessary by the pregnant woman. However, when asked if the Eighth Amendment should be removed from the constitution, only 48% said it should and 41% were opposed to removing it.
- An October 2016 Irish Times/Ipsos MRBI poll found that, regarding the Eighth Amendment, 18% said it should not be repealed; 55% said it should be repealed to allow for limited access to abortion in the cases of rape and fatal foetal abnormality; 19% said it should be repealed to allow for abortion in all cases requested, and 8% had no opinion. Support for a more liberal regime was strongest in Dublin and among younger people.
- An April 2017 Claire Byrne Live/Amárach Research Panel poll asked 1,000 adults "Do you agree with the Citizens' Assembly that abortion, with no restrictions as to reasons, should be made available in Ireland?" 50% said yes, 33% said no and 17% said that they didn't know.
- A May 2017 poll conducted by Ipsos MRBI found 76% of those asked were in favour of allowing abortion in cases of rape.
