= Ms Y =

Y is a woman who unsuccessfully sought to have an abortion in Ireland in 2014. She is an asylum seeker who arrived in Ireland and became suicidal after discovering she was pregnant as a result of a rape in her home country. At the time, Ireland's abortion laws limited abortion in nearly all cases. She was unable to travel to the UK for an abortion, and after a hunger strike the High Court granted an order to hydrate her against her will. After the 1992 X Case judgement, abortion should be legal in cases of suicide, and the then newly introduced Protection of Life During Pregnancy Act 2013 allows abortion in those cases. Her baby was delivered via caesarian section, but there was controversy over whether the government handled the case appropriately.

== Case details ==
On 28 March 2014 a foreign national, with limited English arrived in Ireland. She said she had been raped in her home country. She discovered she was pregnant on 4 April, when she arrived in Ireland, and she sought an abortion.

On 1 July 2014, she attempted to travel to the UK via ferry, but was arrested upon arrival for illegally entering the UK. She said that she felt suicidal, and the two psychiatrists on the panel decreed that she indeed was suicidal but that her pregnancy had proceeded to the point of viability, so that she could not access lawful abortion under the Protection of Life During Pregnancy Act 2013. She then went on hunger strike. The HSE obtained a High Court order to hydrate her. The baby was delivered via caesarian section at 25 weeks gestation over the weekend of 2/3 August 2014.

This was the first case under Ireland's recently enacted law, the Protection of Life During Pregnancy Act 2013.

== Reaction ==
=== Investigation ===
The case was being investigated by the Health Service Executive. Ms Y was too ill to be interviewed by the HSE. However a draft version was prepared and leaked to the media in September 2014. She initiated court action against the HSE to stop the inquiry, and the case was settled out of court with the HSE quashing the report.

=== Protests ===
- 2,000 people protested for more abortion access in Dublin on 20 August 2014.
- Similar protests took place in Galway, Belfast, Cork and Limerick, and outside Irish embassies in London and Berlin.
- 800 pro-choice protestors marched in Dublin on 23 August 2014.
- 400 people attended an anti-abortion vigil in Dublin on 23 August 2014.

=== International media coverage ===
As well as Irish national media attention (in The Irish Times, the Irish Independent, and the Irish Examiner), the case was covered by international media, such as Al Jazeera's The Stream, The Guardian, The Sunday Times, and The New York Times.

== Court case ==
By September 2015, she had been granted refugee status and had begun to sue 11 organisations.

In March 2016, she initiated a court case against the Irish State for "alleged trespass, assault and battery; alleged negligence; and alleged reckless and intentional infliction of emotional harm and suffering".

== See also ==
- Eighth Amendment of the Constitution of Ireland
- Abortion in the Republic of Ireland
- Death of Savita Halappanavar
- X Case
- Protection of Life During Pregnancy Act 2013
- PP v. HSE
