= Thirty-sixth Amendment of the Constitution of Ireland =

2018 amendment liberalising abortion laws

- Referendum: 25 May 2018; In force: 18 September 2018
- To permit the Oireachtas to legislate for the regulation of termination of pregnancy

Results
Choice	Votes	%
Yes	1,429,981	66.40%
No	723,632	33.60%
Valid votes	2,153,613	99.72%
Invalid or blank votes	6,042	0.28%
Total votes	2,159,655	100.00%
Registered voters/turnout	3,367,556	64.13%
- Results by Dáil constituency

The Thirty-sixth Amendment of the Constitution of Ireland (previously bill no. 29 of 2018) is an amendment to the Constitution of Ireland which permits the Oireachtas to legislate for abortion. The constitution had previously prohibited abortion, unless there was a serious risk to the life of the mother.

The proposal is often described as the Repeal of the Eighth Amendment, referring to the 1983 constitutional amendment which guaranteed the right to life of foetuses, making abortion illegal unless the pregnancy is life-threatening. The 2018 amendment replaces Article 40.3.3° of the Constitution, which was added in 1983 and amended in 1992.

The bill was introduced to the Oireachtas on 9 March 2018 by the Fine Gael minority coalition government, and completed its passage through both houses on 27 March 2018. It was put to a referendum on 25 May 2018, and was approved by 66.4% of voters. The amendment took effect when signed into law by President Michael D. Higgins on 18 September 2018.

== Background ==
The British Offences Against the Person Act 1861, which made "unlawful procurement of a miscarriage" a crime, remained in force after Irish independence in 1922. The Eighth Amendment of the Constitution, adopted in 1983, which declares "the right to life of the unborn ... equal [to the] right to life of the mother", was instigated by the Pro-Life Amendment Campaign for fear that the 1861 prohibition might be weakened by liberal legislators or activist judges. In 1992, the Supreme Court ruled in the X Case that abortion is permitted where pregnancy threatens a woman's life, including by risk of suicide. No regulatory framework within the limited scope of the X case judgement was passed until the Protection of Life During Pregnancy Act 2013, impelled by A, B and C v Ireland (2010) in the European Court of Human Rights and death of Savita Halappanavar in 2012 after miscarriage. The 2013 Act repealed the 1861 Act, and makes "destruction of unborn human life" a crime. In the three years 2014–2016, a total of 77 legal abortions were performed under the 2013 Act.

Illegal surgical abortions in Ireland have been practically unknown since the UK's Abortion Act 1967 allowed Irish women to travel to Great Britain for a legal abortion. The 13th and 14th amendments to the constitution, passed in 1992 after the X Case, guarantee the right to information about foreign abortions and to travel abroad for an abortion. The number of women at UK abortion clinics giving Irish addresses peaked at 6,673 in 2001, and was 3,265 in 2016. The decline is partly due to unregulated use of abortion pills illegally delivered from online pharmacies.

While left-wing parties and feminists opposed the 1983 amendment, and have advocated its repeal, this was not supported by the two largest parties for most of the interim: Fianna Fáil, and Fine Gael. In the 2010s, while both parties' leadership opposed broad liberalisation, some accepted the argument for abortion in cases like fatal foetal abnormalities and pregnancy resulting from rape or incest, which are not permitted by the 1983 amendment. These became the focus of campaigning after the 2013 Act. The Abortion Rights Campaign, a pro-choice alliance formed in 2012, held an annual "March for Choice" in Dublin. Anti-abortion groups countered with a "Rally for Life". In the run-up to the 2016 general election, a number of parties committed to a referendum to repeal the Eighth Amendment (Labour, Green Party, Social Democrats, Sinn Féin, and Workers' Party) and a group of feminist law academics published model legislation to show what a post-Eighth Amendment abortion law could look like.

A Fine Gael–led government under Taoiseach Enda Kenny took office after the 2016 election with a programme which promised a randomly selected Citizens' Assembly to report on possible changes to the Eighth Amendment, which would be considered by an Oireachtas committee, to whose report the government would respond officially in debates in both houses of the Oireachtas. Leo Varadkar replaced Enda Kenny as Taoiseach on 14 June 2017 and promised to hold a referendum on abortion in 2018. The Citizens' Assembly, chaired by Supreme Court judge Mary Laffoy, discussed the issue from November 2016 to April 2017 with invited experts and stakeholders, and voted to recommend repealing the existing text and replacing it with an explicit mandate for the Oireachtas to legislate on abortion. It also made recommendations for the consequent legislation, which were more liberal than media commentators had expected. The assembly's report was considered from September to December 2017 by a special Oireachtas committee of 21 members, which also discussed the issue with invited experts; its recommendations by majority vote were broadly similar to those of the assembly. However, it said that because of difficulties legislating for rape and incest, abortion should be legal up to 12 weeks' gestation without restriction; on the other hand, it did not favour socio-economic grounds for abortion after 12 weeks. In January 2018, Minister for Health Simon Harris opened the Dáil debate on the committee's report by listing the numbers from each county who travelled to Great Britain for an abortion in 2016. Fianna Fáil leader Micheál Martin declared that he had changed his view on the issue and gave his support for Repeal of the Eighth Amendment and for the committee's recommendations.

Further action was called into question by a July 2016 High Court ruling that a foetus was a child within the meaning of Article 42A of the Constitution, which guarantees children's rights. The Supreme Court agreed to expedite the government's appeal of the decision, and on 7 March 2018 overturned the High Court judgement, ruling that a foetus was not a child and had no rights other than the right to life mentioned in Article 40.3.3°.

== Changes to the text ==
The Amendment replaced the text of Article 40.3.3°, which read:

The State acknowledges the right to life of the unborn and, with due regard to the equal right to life of the mother, guarantees in its laws to respect, and, as far as practicable, by its laws to defend and vindicate that right.

This subsection shall not limit freedom to travel between the State and another state.

This subsection shall not limit freedom to obtain or make available, in the State, subject to such conditions as may be laid down by law, information relating to services lawfully available in another state.

Note: The first clause was added by the Eighth Amendment approved by referendum in 1983. The second and third clauses were added by the Thirteenth Amendment and the Fourteenth Amendment respectively approved by referendum in 1992.

As the Amendment passed, the subsection was replaced with the following text:

Provision may be made by law for the regulation of termination of pregnancy.

== Subsequent legislation ==
The Department of Health published a policy paper on "Regulation of Termination of Pregnancy" on 9 March 2018. This provided an outline of the policies for legislation which would repeal and replace the Protection of Life During Pregnancy Act 2013 if the Amendment of Constitution Bill was passed in a referendum. Under this scheme, abortion would be permissible in circumstances where:

- there is a risk to the health of a woman, on assessment by two doctors, without a distinction between physical and mental health;
- there is a medical emergency, on assessment by one doctor;
- there is a foetal condition which is likely to lead to death before or shortly after birth, on the assessment of two doctors;
- up to 12 weeks of pregnancy without specific indication, with a time period after an initial assessment by a medical practitioner and the termination procedure.

The Policy Paper also proposed that:

- medical practitioners would have a right of conscientious objection;
- the termination of pregnancy in circumstances other than those under the proposal would be a criminal offence, but that a woman who procures or seeks to procure a termination of pregnancy for herself would not be guilty of an offence.

On 26 March 2018, Tánaiste Simon Coveney announced he would support legislation on the lines of the policy paper, but suggested that this should be entrenched by requiring a two-thirds supermajority in the Dáil for any later amendment. This was aimed at voters prepared to accept the policy-paper regulations, but wary of subsequent liberalisation. Coveney's proposal was dismissed as unconstitutional. On 27 March 2018, the cabinet agreed the general scheme of the proposed "Regulation of Termination of Pregnancy Bill 2018", which health minister Simon Harris summarised that evening in the Seanad. The scheme was published online the following day.

Even after the referendum had passed, "Abortion [would] remain illegal in almost all circumstances until the Oireachtas passes legislation providing otherwise". Health Minister Simon Harris, speaking a few days before the referendum, said the Government hoped to introduce the bill in the Dáil in the autumn and to have passed it by the end of 2018.

== Oireachtas debate ==
The Thirty-sixth Amendment of the Constitution Bill was introduced by Minister for Health Simon Harris. The debate on the Second Stage began on 9 March 2018. The Bill passed all stages in the Dáil on 21 March. The main vote on the bill was at second stage, with 110 in favour and 32 against. Of the 16 who did not vote at second stage, five voted in favour in subsequent votes. At committee stage, there were votes on Section 2 of the bill (98–18) and the short title (96–20); there was also a vote on the final stage (97–25). Fianna Fáil TDs had a free vote although Micheál Martin was reported to be upset at how many voted against the bill. Fine Gael also gave a free vote, including for ministers.

TDs voting on the Thirty-sixth Amendment of the Constitution Bill 2018
Party / group	For	Against	Absent	Notes
Fine Gael	42 (Note: Forty-one on second stage, plus Simon Coveney on final stage)	2	6	Seán Barrett and Peter Fitzpatrick voted against.
Fianna Fáil	22 (Note: Twenty on second stage, plus Seán Fleming and Charlie McConalogue on later stages)	21	1	Billy Kelleher did not vote
Sinn Féin	21 (Note: Nineteen on second stage, plus Dessie Ellis and Kathleen Funchion on later stages)	1	1	Carol Nolan voted against, losing the party whip for three months. She later resigned from the party. Peadar Tóibín did not vote; Gerry Adams voted in Tóibín's seat by mistake on second stage.
Labour Party	7	0	0	
Solidarity–People Before Profit	6	0	0	
Independents 4 Change Group (Note: A technical group of the four Independents 4 Change party members plus three Independents)	7	0	0	
Social Democrats–Green Party (Note: A technical group of two parties)	5	0	0	
Rural Independents Group (Note: A technical group of independents)	1	6	0	Michael Harty voted in favour.
Unaligned Independents	4	2	2	
Total	115	32	10 (Note: Excluding Seán Ó Fearghaíl, who as Ceann Comhairle votes only in the case of a tie.)	

In the Seanad, the second stage was held on 27 March, with a 35–10 vote in favour. Remaining stages were the following day, with the bill passed 39–8 at committee stage and 40–10 at final stage. Eight of the thirteen Fianna Fáil senators voted against, as did two of nineteen from Fine Gael, and independent Rónán Mullen. (Note: Jennifer Murnane O'Connor (FF) voted no on second stage; Paul Coghlan (FG) voted no on final stage; nine other senators voted no both times.)

== Campaign ==
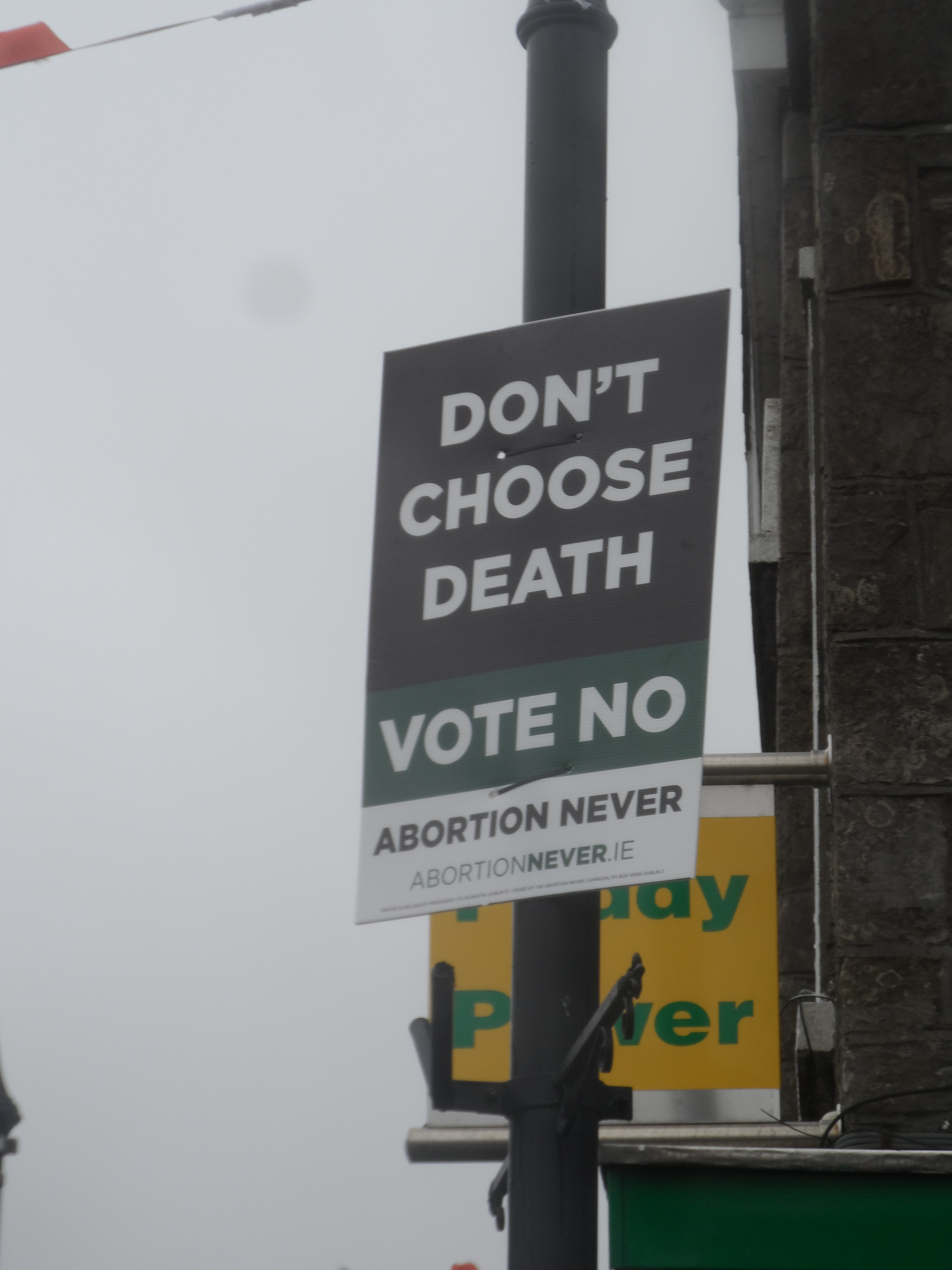
Anti-abortion poster in Trim, County Meath

On 9 March 2018, Minister for Housing, Planning, and Local Government Eoghan Murphy established the statutory Referendum Commission to oversee the referendum campaign, with High Court judge Isobel Kennedy as chair.

Both Fine Gael and Fianna Fáil had allowed their TDs a free vote on the issue in the Dáil. However, although Fine Gael "cannot adopt an official party position because members have been afforded a freedom of conscience vote on issues to do with the referendum", on 21 April, Taoiseach and Fine Gael leader Leo Varadkar launched a Fine Gael "Vote Yes" campaign for Yes-supporting party members, along with party colleagues, including Minister for Health Simon Harris and Fine Gael referendum coordinator, Josepha Madigan.

On 8 May 2018, due to controversy over the origin, number, content, and targeting of adverts on social media, Facebook announced that it would block advertisements placed by foreign entities, most of whom are in the United States, and limit them to adverts placed by Irish organisations. On 9 May, Google announced that it was blocking all adverts on the referendum from its advertising platform and YouTube, citing concerns around the integrity of elections.

On 9 May, the fund-raising web pages of Together for Yes, Amnesty Ireland, and Termination for Medical Reasons were subjected to a denial-of-service attack.

On 20 May, the parents of Savita Halappanavar called for a Yes vote, her father saying, "I hope the people of Ireland will vote yes for abortion, for the ladies of Ireland and the people of Ireland. My daughter, she lost her life because of this abortion law, because of the diagnosis, and she could not have an abortion. She died." After the Yes vote won, Halappanavar's father thanked the people of Ireland.

On 23 May, CNN reported that American-based anti-abortion groups, such as "Let Them Live", have flown to Ireland, in order to sway voters to vote No to the amendment. They entered Ireland by lying to Irish border control about their reason for coming to Ireland, claiming they were only in Ireland to document the event and nothing more.

On 24 May, The New York Times reported that thousands of Irish citizens living around the world were travelling back to Ireland to vote in the referendum – postal or absentee voting is not generally allowed. These voters coalesced online under the social media hashtag "#HomeToVote" and in-person during their transport. The journeys resembled a similar movement in advance of the 2015 Irish constitutional referendums that resulted in the approval of the Thirty-fourth Amendment of the Constitution of Ireland concerning same-sex marriage. In some cases, the travelling voters may have been in breach of Irish law, which removes the right to vote in a referendum from most non-residents, as only those who have lived away for less than 18 months were legally entitled to take part in the referendum. The use of the #HomeToVote hashtag was part of a larger campaign effort from activists who utilised social media, particularly Twitter, to connect and communicate with citizens. Together for Yes used social media to highlight the lived experiences of women endangered by the abortion ban, placing what was viewed as a private issue into the public to "mobilise emotions" online, in the hope that they would vote "Yes".

=== Endorsing a Yes vote ===
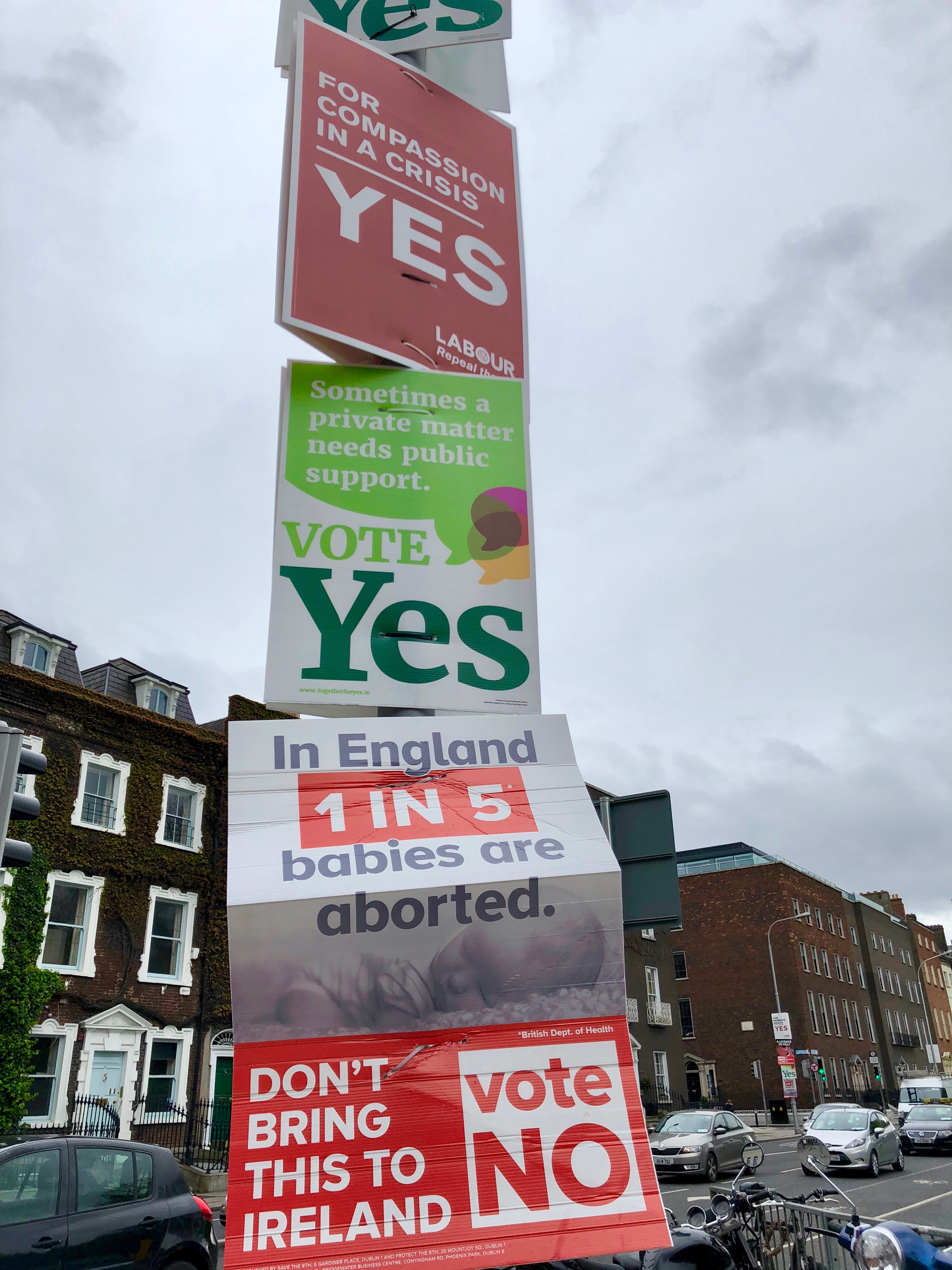
Referendum campaign posters in Dublin

Political parties

- Communist Party of Ireland
- Éirígí
- Green Party
- Labour Party. Party leader Brendan Howlin stated their long standing view was that it was a complex issue what should not be dealt with by a few lines in the constitution. Howlin said: "The Labour Party position is in the case of fatal foetal abnormality, of pregnancy by rape or incest, or where there is a threat to the health of a mother, that option should be available in the discussion between an individual woman and her clinicians."
- Solidarity–People Before Profit
- Social Democrats
- Sinn Féin
- The Workers' Party

Other organisations

- Together for Yes, led by directors from three organisations (The Abortion Rights Campaign, The Coalition to Repeal the Eight and The National Women's Council) was an umbrella group bringing together many pro-repeal organisations, including the Irish Council for Civil Liberties, the Irish Family Planning Association, the Union of Students in Ireland, SIPTU, and Inclusion Ireland, the national association for people with an intellectual disability.
- The Institute of Obstetricians and Gynaecologists: The executive committee of the Institute of Obstetricians and Gynaecologists within the Royal College of Physicians of Ireland voted 18–0, with one abstention, in favour of repeal.
- The Irish Congress of Trade Unions and constituent members Unite, Mandate, the Communications Workers' Union, and SIPTU published a newspaper with many articles calling for a Yes vote on International Workers' Day.
- Amnesty International Ireland, Termination for Medical Reasons, Women's Health in Ireland, The Coalition to Repeal the Eighth, The Abortion Rights Campaign, Choice Ireland, and ROSA were all among those who registered as campaigning on a Yes Vote.
- The Irish Times endorsed a Yes vote in an editorial, arguing, "The Eighth Amendment has turned out to be more damaging than its critics in those febrile days dared imagine", and urging readers to "Repeal the Eighth".

=== Endorsing a No vote ===
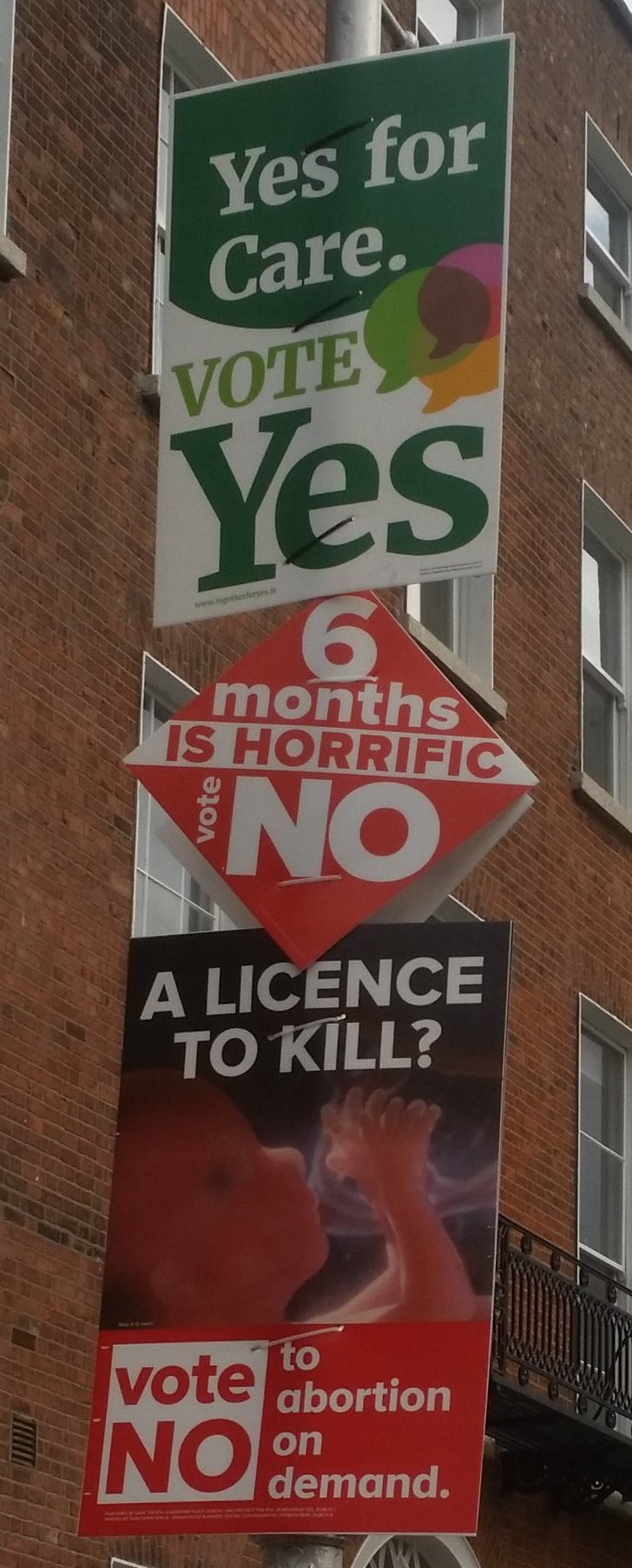
Referendum campaign posters in Dublin

Political Parties

- Renua. The political party had been established from a revolt by some Fine Gael members who rejected the whip to vote against the Protection of Life During Pregnancy Bill. While they had been open to a coalition planning to legislate for abortion in 2015, and had declared a neutral stance in 2016, In March 2017, the party declared it was against any repeal of the amendment. Then-leader John Leahy said that, while members declaring freedom of conscience would not be asked to support or canvas, he expected that party candidates "will be required to subscribe fully to our position on this matter".
- The National Party who launched the "Abortion Never" campaign, though the party was unregistered at this point.

Other Organisations

- The Pro Life Campaign, who campaigned under the slogan "Love Both".
- Save the 8th, a campaign supported by the Life Institute and Youth Defence, registered with the Standards in Public Office Commission in January 2018. The Iona Institute, Mother and Fathers Matter and the Life Institute also all registered as campaigning for a No vote.
- Cherish All the Children Equally, a group of republican campaigners which described itself as "progressive, republican, and of the left", and included current and former Sinn Féin supporters at odds with the party's stance.
- The Irish Catholic Bishops' Conference said repealing the Eighth Amendment would be "a shocking step" and "a manifest injustice".
- The Islamic Cultural Centre of Ireland.
- The Orange Order.

=== Neutral and other positions ===
A number of political parties, religious bodies and other organisations took a freedom of conscience vote or position, calling on individual members to decide for themselves.

==== Political parties ====
- Fianna Fáil did not take a formal position on the referendum. However, 31 of the party's TDs and Senators posed for a photograph showing their opposition to repealing the eighth, therefore over half of the parliamentary party supported a "No" vote. Nonetheless, the party's leader Micheál Martin supported "Yes", and was one of the two speakers for the "Yes" side in the final televised debate before the vote, along with Sinn Féin leader Mary Lou McDonald.
- Fine Gael "cannot adopt an official party position because members have been afforded a freedom of conscience vote on issues to do with the referendum". However, Josepha Madigan, the Minister for Culture, Heritage, and the Gaeltacht, co-ordinated a campaign for "Yes"-supporting party members, which was formally launched on 21 April 2018 by Leo Varadkar and Simon Harris. The campaign supported Together for Yes, and some Fine Gael TDs put up posters of their own.

==== Religious bodies ====
- The Catholic Church did not take an official position on the referendum, leaving public campaigning to civil groups said to ensure they were seen as "not interfering directly in the process". Though some Church leadership, including the Irish Bishops Conference wrote pastoral letters and shared messages urging parishioners to vote No. This prompted the Association of Catholic Priests to issue a statement that they were concerned about using the pulpit in this manner, saying "we believe this is inappropriate and insensitive and will be regarded by some as an abuse of the Eucharist."
- The Church of Ireland issued statements favouring giving the Oireachtas responsibility for abortion legislation, but opposing unrestricted abortion up to 12 weeks' gestation; it concluded, "We therefore ask Church members to think through the issues involved carefully and with prayer". This contrasted to their position in the 1983 referendum.
- The Presbyterian Church in Ireland initially supported a No vote, but later moved to a seemingly more neutral stance. Their General Council issued a congregational letter in April 2018 against changes to the Eight Amendment. They encouraged church members to " consider these matters prayerfully and with great care over the coming weeks and to vote in accordance with their conscience.” In the weeks before the referendum they reflected on that statement saying "At this time, we felt, in order to save as many lives as possible, the Eighth Amendment should be retained. That was communicated by letter throughout our church, but that is for moral guidance. In reality, people must vote according to their conscience. We do not prescribe to people how they should vote."
- The Methodist Church in Ireland did not take a formal stance. In April 2015 the Methodist Church's Council on Social Responsibility issued a statement to say that the Church was "against abortion on demand" and that "We would urge that abortion is seen as a last resort. Any provision of an abortion service does not mean that it has to be availed of, and there should be no pressure to do so". This was perceived by some to be in favour of a No vote. In May 2015 clarified this statement, with saying Dr Fergus O'Ferrall "The Methodist Church would never dare to tell members how to vote" as well as "If it's not carried, the issues are not going to go away."
- The head imam of the Al-Mustafa Islamic Centre supported repeal of the eighth amendment and state-funded abortions in "extraordinary circumstances", but rejected "calls for abortions to be freely available until the end of the first trimester".

==== Other organisations ====
- The Gaelic Athletic Association reiterated its policy of neutrality on political issues, in response to media reports of various players and managers publicly taking sides.
- The Association of Catholic Priests took a neutral position during the referendum. They asked priests not to direct parishioners to a Yes or No vote

=== Television debates during the referendum campaign ===
Television debates during the referendum campaign
Date	Programme	Channel	Moderator	"Yes" advocates	"No" advocates	Notes	Refs
27 April	The Late Late Show	RTÉ One	Ryan Tubridy	Peter Boylan (obstetrician); Mary Favier (GP, Together for Yes)	Wendy Grace (journalist); Caroline Simons (lawyer, Love Both)	The debate was the last segment of the chat show. Members of the audience also spoke.	
14 May	Claire Byrne Live	RTÉ One	Claire Byrne	Orla O'Connor (National Women's Council of Ireland), Peter Boylan (obstetrician), Mary Lou McDonald (Sinn Féin leader)	Maria Steen (lawyer, Save the Eighth); John Monaghan (obstetrician); Mary Butler (Fianna Fáil TD)	There was criticism of boisterous reactions from audience members during the debate.	
22 May	Prime Time	RTÉ One	Miriam O'Callaghan	Simon Harris (Fine Gael minister); [ Mary Higgins (obstetrician) withdrawn]	Peadar Tóibín (Sinn Féin TD); [ Cora Sherlock (Love Both) withdrew]	Sherlock was withdrawn against her will by Love Both, Save the 8th and Iona Institute, who wanted the better performing Maria Steen instead. RTÉ denied the request, and Higgins was withdrawn to equalise the number of speakers on both sides. Sinn Féin clarified that Tóibín's views differ from his party's. Audience members contributed to the debate.	
23 May	Pat Kenny Tonight	TV3	Pat Kenny	Regina Doherty (Fine Gael minister); Colm O'Gorman (Amnesty International Ireland)	Rónán Mullen (independent senator); Maria Steen (Iona Institute; Save The 8th)		
23 May	The Tonight Show	TV3	Matt Cooper and Ivan Yates	Micheál Martin (Fianna Fáil leader); Mary Lou McDonald (Sinn Féin leader)	Declan Ganley (businessman); Theresa Lowe (lawyer, former broadcaster)		

== Opinion and exit polling ==
When voters were asked how they voted, exit polls showed the following results:

Date(s) conducted	Polling organisation/client	Sample size	Yes	No	Lead
25 May 2018	Behaviour & Attitudes/RTÉ (exit poll)	3,800	69.4%	30.6%	38.8%
25 May 2018	Ipsos MRBI/Irish Times (exit poll)	>4,500	68%	32%	36%

When respondents were asked if they would support the amendment, opinion polls showed the following results:

Date(s) conducted	Polling organisation/client	Sample size	Yes	No	Undecided	Lead
10–16 May 2018	Red C/Sunday Business Post	1,015	56%	27%	17%	29%
14–15 May 2018	Ipsos MRBI/Irish Times	1,200	44%	32%	24%	12%
3–15 May 2018	Behaviour & Attitudes/The Sunday Times	935	52%	24%	19%	28%
18–30 Apr 2018	Millward Brown/Sunday Independent	1,003	45%	34%	18% (Note: 18% were undecided and 4% refused to answer.)	11%
19–25 Apr 2018	Red C/Sunday Business Post	1,000	53%	26%	19%	27%
5–17 Apr 2018	Behaviour & Attitudes/The Sunday Times	928	47%	29%	21%	18%
16–17 Apr 2018	Ipsos MRBI/Irish Times (Note: 62% agreed with the statement that the law needs to change to recognise a woman's right to choose. 56% agreed that the 12 weeks proposal, while they had "reservations" about it, was a "reasonable compromise" and would be an "improvement on the current situation". 41% agreed with the statement: "I agree the law needs to be changed, but the proposal for abortion on request up to 12 weeks goes too far." 40% said that abortion "is wrong and should not be made more widely available".)	1,200	47%	28%	20%	19%
15–22 Mar 2018	Red C/Sunday Business Post	1,000	56%	26%	18%	30%
6–13 Mar 2018	Behaviour & Attitudes/The Sunday Times	900	49%	27%	20%	22%
1–13 Feb 2018	Behaviour & Attitudes/The Sunday Times	926	49%	30%	21%	19%
18–25 Jan 2018	Red C/Sunday Business Post	1,003	60%	20%	20%	40%
25 Jan 2018	Ipsos MRBI/Irish Times	—N/a	56%	29%	15%	27%
4–5 Dec 2017	Ipsos MRBI/Irish Times	1,200	62%	26%	13%	36%

During the course of the referendum campaign some surveys asked if respondents supported the proposed legislation allowing termination for any reason for the first 12 weeks of pregnancy. The following results were recorded:

Date(s) conducted	Polling organisation/client	Sample size	Yes	No	Undecided	Lead
10–16 May 2018	Red C/Sunday Business Post	1,015	52%	34%	13% (Note: 13% were undecided and 1% refused to answer.)	18%
3–15 May 2018	Behaviour & Attitudes/The Sunday Times	935	44%	34%	22%	10%
18–30 Apr 2018	Millward Brown/Sunday Independent	1,003	53% (Note: 53% consists of 42% 'About right' + 11% 'Not far enough', as against 32% 'Too far', with 15% 'Don't know')	32%	15%	21%
19–25 Apr 2018	Red C/Sunday Business Post	1,000	47%	32%	21%	15%
4–18 Apr 2018	Ireland Thinks/Irish Daily Mail	1,026	46%	31%	16%	15%
5–17 Apr 2018	Behaviour & Attitudes/The Sunday Times	928	43%	36%	21%	7%
6–13 Mar 2018	Behaviour & Attitudes/The Sunday Times	900	43%	35%	22%	8%
1–13 Feb 2018	Behaviour & Attitudes/The Sunday Times	926	43%	35%	22%	8%
14–22 Dec 2017	Ireland Thinks/Irish Daily Mail	1,144	53%	27%	20%	26%

== Result ==
Polls opened at 07:00 IST (UTC+1) and closed at 22:00 IST on 25 May 2018. Twelve offshore islands voted the day before, to allow for possible delays delivering ballot boxes to the count centres. Counting began at 09:00 on 26 May. All Irish citizens entered on the electoral register were eligible to vote. A total of 3,229,672 people were on the annual electoral register (as of 15 February 2018) and an additional 118,389 electors were added to the supplementary register by the closing date of 8 May 2018, an unusually high number of late registrations. Dáil constituencies were used to organise the voting, with the returning officer for each appointed by the city or county council, and results sent to the national returning officer in Dublin. Although a close result had been expected by observers, an exit poll conducted by The Irish Times predicted a 68% Yes result, while one conducted by RTÉ predicted a similar Yes result of 69.4%. The day after the vote, Save the 8th campaign conceded defeat.

Thirty-sixth Amendment of the Constitution Bill 2018
Choice	Votes	%
For	1,429,981	66.40
Against	723,632	33.60
Total	2,153,613	100.00
Valid votes	2,153,613	99.72
Invalid/blank votes	6,042	0.28
Total votes	2,159,655	100.00
Registered voters/turnout	3,367,556	64.13

Results by constituency
Constituency	Electorate	Turnout (%)	Votes		Proportion of votes	
Constituency	Electorate	Turnout (%)	Yes	No	Yes	No
Carlow–Kilkenny	112,704	61.99%	44,211	25,418	63.50%	36.50%
Cavan–Monaghan	91,602	63.39%	32,115	25,789	55.46%	44.54%
Clare	83,225	64.37%	34,328	19,079	64.28%	35.72%
Cork East	85,643	63.80%	34,941	19,550	64.12%	35.88%
Cork North-Central	84,412	62.45%	33,639	18,908	64.02%	35.98%
Cork North-West	68,830	65.93%	27,194	18,054	60.10%	39.90%
Cork South-Central	87,524	66.73%	40,071	18,138	68.84%	31.16%
Cork South-West	60,356	67.35%	26,147	14,387	64.51%	35.49%
Donegal	118,901	57.06%	32,559	35,091	48.13%	51.87%
Dublin Bay North	108,209	71.60%	57,754	19,573	74.69%	25.31%
Dublin Bay South	78,892	54.94%	33,919	9,928	78.49%	21.51%
Dublin Central	48,002	51.52%	18,863	5,790	76.51%	23.49%
Dublin Fingal	95,926	70.39%	51,840	15,523	76.96%	23.04%
Dublin Mid-West	71,558	67.30%	35,192	12,838	73.27%	26.73%
Dublin North-West	62,270	62.76%	28,477	10,489	73.08%	26.92%
Dublin Rathdown	64,887	70.11%	34,529	10,845	76.10%	23.90%
Dublin South-Central	76,914	59.60%	34,201	11,530	74.79%	25.21%
Dublin South-West	106,588	68.58%	54,642	18,301	74.91%	25.09%
Dublin West	67,138	67.77%	33,595	11,794	74.02%	25.98%
Dún Laoghaire	95,372	68.52%	50,243	14,953	77.06%	22.94%
Galway East	69,631	63.47%	26,525	17,546	60.19%	39.81%
Galway West	107,726	59.90%	42,422	21,906	65.95%	34.05%
Kerry	111,108	62.41%	40,285	28,851	58.27%	41.73%
Kildare North	85,587	63.76%	40,058	14,399	73.56%	26.44%
Kildare South	63,190	61.34%	27,307	11,339	70.66%	29.34%
Laois	63,860	62.01%	24,232	15,264	61.35%	38.65%
Limerick City	77,836	62.01%	32,169	15,941	66.87%	33.13%
Limerick County	67,592	62.45%	24,448	17,644	58.08%	41.92%
Longford–Westmeath	89,665	59.30%	30,876	22,113	58.27%	41.73%
Louth	106,184	65.89%	46,429	23,333	66.55%	33.45%
Mayo	91,377	62.09%	32,287	24,287	57.07%	42.93%
Meath East	67,755	65.61%	30,686	13,652	69.21%	30.79%
Meath West	65,651	62.94%	26,343	14,850	63.95%	36.05%
Offaly	66,120	64.71%	24,781	17,908	58.05%	41.95%
Roscommon–Galway	63,158	65.70%	23,677	17,709	57.21%	42.79%
Sligo–Leitrim	95,954	61.08%	34,685	23,730	59.38%	40.62%
Tipperary	113,546	63.84%	42,731	29,516	59.15%	40.85%
Waterford	83,107	64.30%	37,016	16,296	69.43%	30.57%
Wexford	110,494	66.27%	49,934	23,069	68.40%	31.60%
Wicklow	99,062	74.48%	54,629	18,931	74.26%	25.74%
Total	3,367,556	64.13%	1,429,981	723,632	66.40%	33.60%

=== Analysis of results ===
The turnout of voters, at 2,159,655, was the highest thus far in any Irish constitutional referendum. This beat the previous record, which had been held by the 2015 marriage equality referendum, by 209,930 votes.

Results by region

All four regions voted Yes, ranging from 57.5% Yes for Connacht-Ulster to 75.5% for Dublin.

Regional Results
Region	Turnout (%)	Votes		Proportion of votes	
Region	Turnout (%)	Yes	No	Yes	No
Connacht–Ulster	61.3%	224,270	166,058	57.5%	42.5%
Dublin	65.7%	433,255	140,934	75.5%	24.5%
Leinster (excluding Dublin)	64.7%	399,487	200,276	66.6%	33.4%
Munster	64.0%	372,969	216,364	63.3%	36.7%
Total	64.1%	1,429,981	723,632	66.4%	33.6%

By age

According to exit polls by The Irish Times and by RTÉ, every age group voted Yes, except those aged 65 and over, with the highest Yes vote being from the youngest age groups. The details were:

Age group	Yes		No	
Age group	Irish Times	RTÉ	Irish Times	RTÉ
18 to 24	87%	87.6%	13%	12.4%
25 to 34	83%	84.6%	17%	15.4%
35 to 49	74%	72.8%	26%	27.2%
50 to 64	63%	63.7%	37%	36.3%
65 and over	40%	41.3%	60%	58.7%

By gender

According to the exit polls, both genders voted Yes, with women doing so somewhat more heavily than men. The details were:

Gender	Yes		No	
Gender	Irish Times	RTÉ	Irish Times	RTÉ
Female	70%	72.1%	30%	27.9%
Male	65%	65.9%	35%	34.1%

By urban-rural

According to the exit polls, both urban and rural voters voted Yes, with urban voters doing so more heavily than rural ones. The details were:

Urban-Rural	Yes		No	
Urban-Rural	Irish Times	RTÉ	Irish Times	RTÉ
Urban	71%	72.3%	29%	27.7%
Rural	60%	63.3%	40%	36.7%

== Reactions to the result ==
=== Ireland ===
Yes side

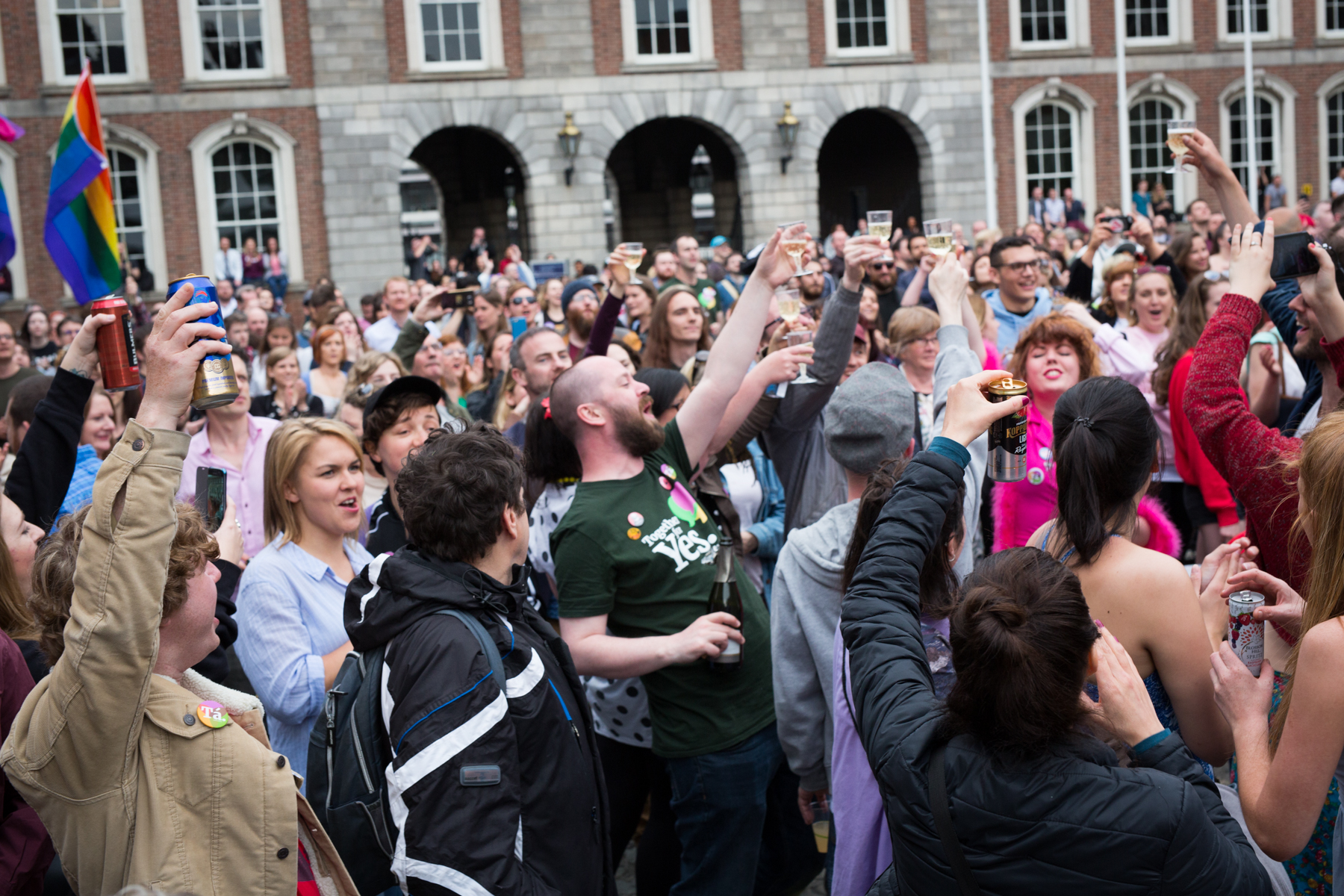
"Yes" supporters at Dublin Castle after the Referendum results were declared

Taoiseach Leo Varadkar said: "I think what we've seen today really is the culmination of a quiet revolution that's taken place in Ireland for the past 10 or 20 years. This has been a great exercise in democracy, and the people have spoken. The people have said we want a modern constitution for a modern country, that we trust women, and we respect them to make the right decision, the right choices about their own health care."

Tánaiste Simon Coveney said: "For me, the margin of victory is important, but equally important is that there is no Dublin versus the rest or no urban/rural divide – in virtually every part of the country, people have voted in big numbers to allow the government and the Oireachtas to change Ireland for the better."

Orla O'Connor, director of the National Women's Council and co-director of Together for Yes, thanked "Yes" voters, saying: "This is phenomenal. This was a grass-roots, people campaign, and I think what today will show is that this is a people's referendum. Presuming that these exit polls are correct, the public haven't just spoken, this is a resounding roar from Irish people about the horrors of the Eighth and how women should no longer be treated as second-class citizens in our society."

No side

Cora Sherlock, of the LoveBoth campaign, said: "This is a very sad day for Ireland, that people have voted for abortion. We need to remember what they have won. All that is being offered is abortion. There has been no talking about why Irish woman travel, what options could have been put on the table."

Declan Ganley tweeted: "I've been thinking about conscientious objection. I will not pay for the killing of Ireland's unborn children, I cannot be a party to it. So, there will need to be a way to exempt conscientious objectors taxes from paying for them in any way, shape, or form."

Catholic Bishop Kevin Doran said: "While the Catholic Church is a family, and nobody ever gets struck off, what I'd say to a Catholic who voted Yes is this: If you voted Yes, knowing and intending that abortion would be the outcome, then you should consider coming to Confession." This statement caused controversy, leading to former President of Ireland Mary McAleese weighing in to say that baptised voters showed that freedom of conscience trumped the Church's view of mortal sin.

=== United Kingdom ===
UK Prime Minister Theresa May contacted Taoiseach Leo Varadkar, and posted to Twitter, saying: "The Irish Referendum yesterday was an impressive show of democracy which delivered a clear and unambiguous result. I congratulate the Irish people on their decision and all of #Together4Yes on their successful campaign." However, she later reiterated her position that abortion is considered a devolved matter in Northern Ireland, and, accordingly, that the UK government would not intervene. This followed a statement from Arlene Foster, leader of the Northern Ireland's anti-abortion DUP, whose votes were needed to give May's Conservative government its parliamentary majority, that the issue should be decided by the Northern Ireland Assembly.

Senior Conservatives, such as Commons Health Committee chairperson Sarah Wollaston and education minister Anne Milton, backed calls for a free vote on the issue, while Labour MP Stella Creasy said she would table an amendment on the matter to the Domestic Violence Bill and said that over 150 parliamentarians had expressed support for the change, and Labour's shadow Attorney General Shami Chakrabarti called the issue a test for May's feminism. May's spokesperson refused to say whether Conservative MPs would be given a free vote in such a "hypothetical" situation, but said that there had been free votes on the abortion issue in the past.

Northern Ireland

The result re-opened the debate about the legality of abortion in Northern Ireland. In all constituent countries of the United Kingdom but Northern Ireland, abortion is legal in many circumstances under the Abortion Act 1967. Abortion in Northern Ireland has historically been considered a devolved matter, to be decided by the Northern Ireland Assembly.

In Belfast, a rally took place advocating for the liberalisation of abortion laws in Northern Ireland, where there were calls for the UK government to step in. UK intervention to liberalise abortion laws in Northern Ireland was opposed by the Democratic Unionist Party, then largest party in Northern Ireland and which supported minority Conservative government in the UK.

Since 2020 abortion has been legal in Northern Ireland.

=== Elsewhere ===
- Speaking from his home in Karnataka, south-west India, Andanappa Yalagi, the father of Savita Halappanavar (who died from sepsis in 2012 after being refused an abortion in Galway), thanked the Irish people for their "historic vote".
- Canadian Prime Minister Justin Trudeau, who, when visiting Dublin in 2017, had urged Taoiseach Leo Varadkar to liberalise Ireland's abortion laws as a fundamental human rights issue, phoned to congratulate him, and also tweeted: "What a moment for democracy and women's rights. Tonight, I spoke with Taoiseach @campaignforLeo and his team and congratulated them on the Yes side's referendum victory legalising abortion in Ireland."
- Varadkar also received messages from Xavier Bettel, Prime Minister of Luxembourg, and from Jüri Ratas, Prime Minister of Estonia.
- Finland's Foreign Minister Timo Soini, a Blue Reform MP and "a self-described Roman Catholic", criticised the Irish abortion vote, writing that "the world had become odd if it was necessary to find reasons to defend life". Following a query by Green Party MP Ville Niinistö, Interior Minister Kai Mykkänen, and Foreign Trade and Development Minister Anne-Mari Virolainen, both National Coalition Party MPs, insisted that Soini's position was not the official position of the Finnish Government, and that the right to abortion was a matter of human rights.
- Sweden's Foreign Minister Margot Wallström applauded the result of the referendum.
- France's President Emmanuel Macron tweeted that he welcomed the result.

== Challenge to referendum result ==
The Provisional Referendum Certificate was signed by Barry Ryan, the Referendum Returning Officer, on 28 May 2018, and published in Iris Oifigiúil on 29 May. Challenges against the validity of the referendum must be brought within seven days of publication.

Three petitions challenging the result were made within the deadline, by Joanna Jordan, Charles Byrne, and Ciarán Tracey. These alleged variously that the Referendum Commission information booklet was biased and that the electoral register was unreliable, with unexplained deletion of older voters' details and failure to delete those of emigrants who were thus able to travel back to vote despite being ineligible. Jordan's unsuccessful petition against the children's rights amendment delayed its enactment from 2012 until 2015. Enactment of the 2015 marriage equality amendment was similarly delayed for three months.

The applications seeking leave to bring judicial review proceedings were heard in the High Court from 26 to 29 June. Tracey withdrew and leave was refused for another man, Diarmaid McConville, to take over his application. On 20 July, Justice Peter Kelly ruled against the other two applicants, saying they had failed to provide prima facie evidence of anything likely to have changed the result of the vote, but left them a week to challenge this in the Court of Appeal. Costs were awarded against both applicants. Byrne did not appeal, while Jordan's appeal was heard on 17 August.

Separately, on 31 July, the Court of Appeal rejected McConville's appeal against the refusal to allow him to take over Tracey's petition application, but gave him time to apply to the Supreme Court, which on 16 August denied him leave to appeal. On 27 August, the Court of Appeal dismissed Jordan's challenge, with Justice George Birmingham stating that "Jordan's assertions were so entirely devoid of substance that we can only conclude they were made with reckless and irresponsible abandon". Before the 31 August deadline, Jordan applied to the Supreme Court for leave to appeal; the court decided on 7 September to refuse to hear the appeal, thus allowing the amendment to be signed into law by President Higgins on 18 September 2018.

== Implementing legislation ==
Even though the referendum had been carried, abortion remained "illegal in almost all circumstances until the Oireachtas passes legislation providing otherwise", which the Government originally hoped to introduce into the Dáil in the autumn, and to have passed by the end of 2018. After the referendum, there were calls for the process to be sped up, and health minister Simon Harris said that the bill would be introduced before the summer recess and become law by the autumn. The Irish Times reported on 6 June that the Dáil second stage would begin on 11 July, possibly extending the Dáil term, and that remaining Oireachtas stages would be in September and October. The introduction of legislation was held up until after the processing of the petitions against the referendum result.

Media had speculated before the vote that a narrow Yes majority would encourage No-supporting legislators to obstruct or weaken the legislative provisions compared to the draft published in March. Conversely, media said afterwards that the large majority made such moves unlikely; in particular, Fianna Fáil opponents would not "stand in the way" of the "will of the people".

An updated general scheme of the Health (Regulation of Termination of Pregnancy) Bill 2018 was published by the Department of Health on 10 July. The final text was agreed by the cabinet at a meeting on 27 September and published the same day. Its second reading in the Dáil was introduced by minister Simon Harris on 4 October.

On 5 December, the Health (Regulation of Termination of Pregnancy) Bill passed final stages in the Dáil, where it was approved by 90 votes to 15 (with 12 abstentions). On 13 December, Seanad Éireann approved the bill by 27 votes to 5. On 20 December 2018, President Michael D. Higgins signed the bill into law, officially legalising abortion in Ireland for the first time for non-life-threatening reasons.
