= Abortion in Ireland =

Abortion in Ireland may refer to:

- Abortion in the Republic of Ireland, abortion in the sovereign state of Ireland
- Abortion in Northern Ireland, a constituent country of the UK
