= HomeToVote =

Social media ballot-participation campaign

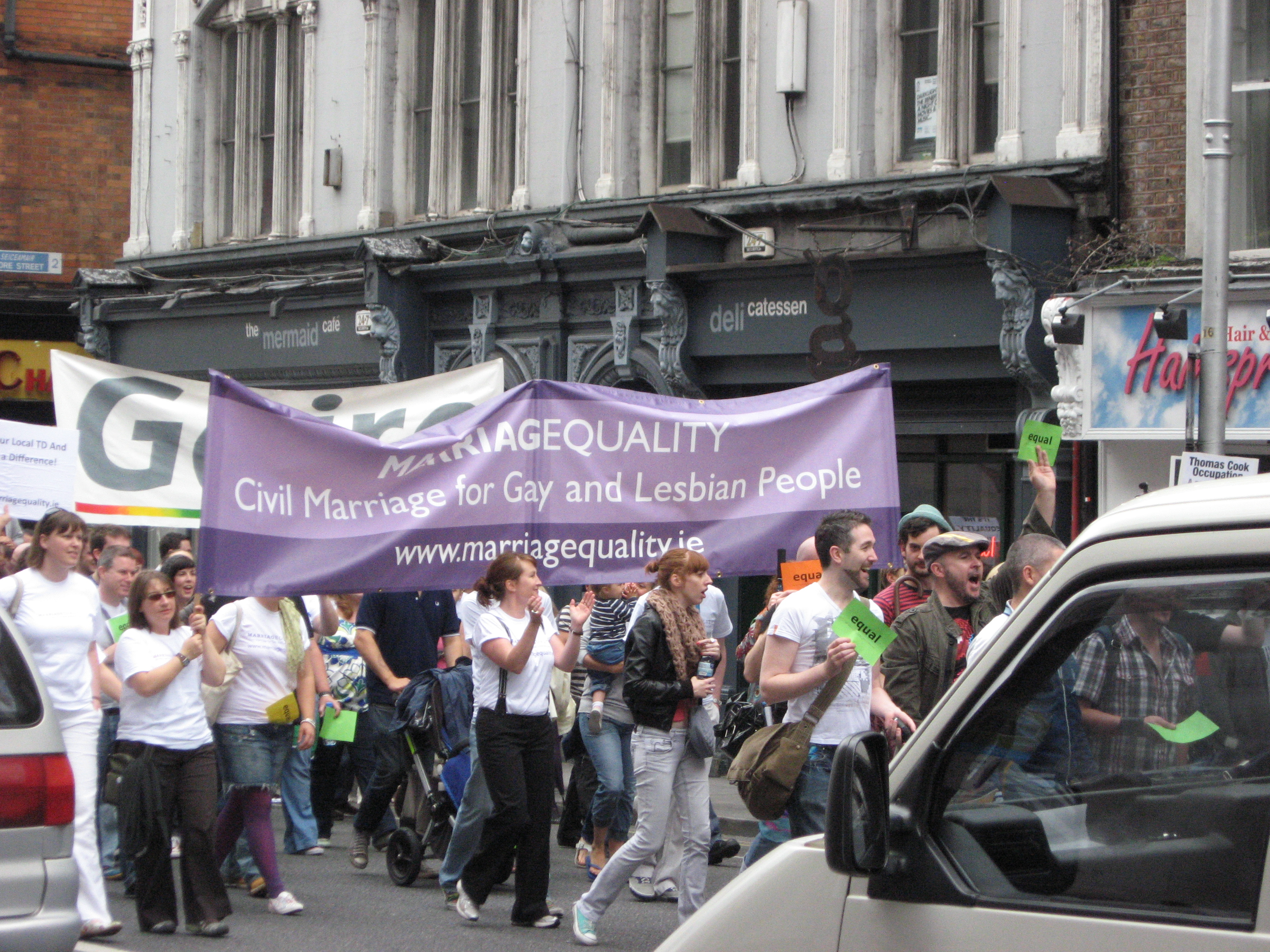
Campaigners in Ireland's 2015 referendum on Marriage Equality, which spawned the #hometovote hashtag and movement

#HomeToVote is a Twitter hashtag and social media campaign in Ireland that urged Irish people abroad to return home to vote for same-sex marriage in 2015 and to repeal the country's abortion ban in 2018. Although postal voting is allowed in elections to Seanad Éireann and arrangements exist for the families of military and diplomatic staff posted overseas to vote by post, the general rule is that voting in Irish elections must be done in person.

Under the 1992 Electoral Act, Irish citizens retain their right to vote in Irish elections for 18 months only after taking residence in another country. This is based on the condition that the voter intends to return to Ireland.

In 2015, voters in favour of same-sex marriage used social media to encourage Irish expatriates to return to Ireland to vote in favour of same-sex marriage. The hashtag was tweeted 72,000 times, ranking fifth in Twitter's news trends of the year. In April 2018, abortion rights activists used the hashtag to capitalize on the energy from three years prior, encouraging Irish citizens abroad to return home and vote to repeal the Eighth Amendment, an amendment asserting equal rights between a pregnant woman and her fetus.

== Origin ==
=== 2015 referendum to legalize same-sex marriage ===
On May 22, 2015, Irish citizens voted to approve the referendum to recognize marriage between any two partners. Under Irish law, there are few options for voting by mail. After the financial crisis in 2008, 250,000 Irish citizens emigrated for economic reasons, 70% of whom were in their 20s. In order to secure the right to same-sex marriage, citizens took to social media with the hashtag #HomeToVote to ask eligible voters to return home to Ireland to fight for same-sex marriage.

=== 2018 referendum to repeal Ireland's abortion ban ===
London-based group London-Irish Abortion Rights Campaign (ARC) encouraged Irish citizens who had lived in Ireland in the previous 18 months to return to Ireland to vote in the historic opportunity to repeal Ireland's abortion ban. In April 2018, ARC released a video encouraging the 40,000 Irish citizens abroad who are eligible to vote to return and vote to repeal the Eighth Amendment. The campaign was inspired by Ireland's vote three years prior to legalize same-sex marriage, which brought thousands of Irish citizens home.

Some Irish voters cited the 3,500 women who travel to England for abortion care as inspiration for their journeys home to vote.

== Voting outcomes ==
=== Same-sex marriage ===
Ireland overwhelmingly voted to support the referendum, making them the world's first country to legalize same-sex marriage by popular vote. 1,201,607 people, or 62% of the electorate, voted in favor of legalization.

=== Abortion rights ===
On May 25, 2018, Ireland held a referendum to repeal the Eighth Amendment and replace it with a clause that allows legislation to regulate abortions. The referendum allowed Irish citizens the opportunity to reform their abortion laws for the first time in 35 years. The referendum passed with a landslide victory, repealing one of the world's most restrictive bans on abortion.

== Reach and impact ==
The hashtag #HomeToVote was tweeted 72,000 times leading up to the referendum vote for same-sex marriage in 2015, ranking fifth in Twitter's news trends that year. Between May 23 and the afternoon of May 24, the hashtag was mentioned 43,096 times on social media in support of legalizing abortion services.
