= Protection of Life During Pregnancy Act 2013 =

The Protection of Life During Pregnancy Act 2013 (Act No.35 of 2013; previously Bill No.66 of 2013) was an Act of the Oireachtas which, until 2018, defined the circumstances and processes within which abortion in Ireland could be legally performed. The act gave effect in statutory law to the terms of the Constitution as interpreted by the Supreme Court in the 1992 judgment in the X Case. That judgment allowed for abortion where pregnancy endangers a woman's life, including through a risk of suicide. The provisions relating to suicide had been the most contentious part of the bill. Having passed both Houses of the Oireachtas in July 2013, it was signed into law on 30 July by Michael D. Higgins, the President of Ireland, and commenced on 1 January 2014. The 2013 Act was repealed by the Health (Regulation of Termination of Pregnancy) Act 2018, which commenced on 1 January 2019.

== Background ==
Under section 58 of the Offences against the Person Act 1861, unlawfully attempting to procure a miscarriage was a crime punishable by up to life imprisonment. A 1983 amendment to the 1937 Constitution guaranteed to vindicate the "right to life of the unborn" with due regard for "the equal right to life of the mother". Proponents of the amendment believed that it would guarantee abortion could never be allowed in any circumstances. However, in 1992 the Supreme Court ruled in the X Case that abortion was permitted where pregnancy presented "a real and substantial risk to the life, as distinct from the health, of the mother", including where the risk was through suicide. There were two attempts to amend the Constitution to explicitly rule out suicide as grounds for abortion. These were rejected at referendums in 1992 and in 2002; some no-voters felt the restriction was too strong and others that it was not strong enough. No legislation was passed to amend the 1861 Act in the light of the 1992 judgment.

In December 2010, in the case A, B and C v Ireland, the European Court of Human Rights (ECtHR) ruled that the State had infringed a complainant's rights by not providing clear information on whether she was entitled to an abortion. The state had a year to respond officially, and after the 2011 general election, the coalition government decided in December 2011 to appoint an expert group to advise on how to implement the ECtHR judgment. Following the death of Savita Halappanavar in Galway on 28 October 2012 of maternal sepsis after a miscarriage, her husband and friends told local pro-choice groups they blamed her death on the denial of her request for an abortion; The Irish Times broke the story on 12 November and it fed into the wider abortion debate. On the day the story broke, the Irish government confirmed that the expert group handed in its report to the Department of Health the night before. The committee offered four possibilities: 1) non-statutory guidelines 2) statutory regulations 3) legislation only and 4) legislation plus regulations. In December, the government decided to pursue option 4 in the expert group's report: legislation plus regulations.

== Provisions ==
The Act specified the number and specialty of medical practitioners who concurred that a termination was necessary to prevent a risk of death. Those criteria differed in three scenarios:

Risk of loss of life from physical illness
Two physicians, one an obstetrician and the other a specialist in the field of the relevant condition, concurred. For example, if the woman had cancer, the two physicians were an obstetrician and an oncologist. Where relevant, the specialists also consulted the woman's general practitioner (GP). The termination was an elective procedure performed at an appropriate institution.
Risk of loss of life from physical illness in emergency
In a medical emergency, a single physician provided the diagnosis and performed the termination.
Risk of loss of life from suicide
Three physicians concurred; an obstetrician, a psychiatrist with experience treating women during or after pregnancy, and another psychiatrist. At least one of them should consult the woman's GP with her consent. The termination was an elective procedure performed at an appropriate institution.

The physicians' diagnosis had to be "an opinion formed in good faith which has regard to the need to preserve unborn human life as far as practicable". Normal informed consent was required. Medical personnel with conscience objections to abortion were not required to participate in terminations, but had to transfer care of a patient in such cases. All terminations were notified to the Minister for Health within 28 days. The Minister made an annual report of such notifications.

Where a termination was requested but refused, a woman could appeal to the Health Service Executive (HSE). The HSE established a panel of at least 10 physicians, from whom a committee of two or three reviewed any application within three days. The committee members' specialties depended on whether the condition was physical or mental, in the same way as for the initial assessment. The HSE published an annual report on the review process.

The Act also repealed sections 58 and 59 of the 1861 Act; these criminalised attempted or actual procurement of miscarriage, and assisting such procurement. It replaced them with a new offence of "destruction of unborn human life", with a maximum penalty of 14 years' imprisonment. The director of a body corporate which performed such a procedure could be guilty of a similar offence. As required by the Constitution, the right to travel abroad for abortion (13th amendment), and to provide information about foreign abortion (14th amendment), were protected.

The Act defined the "unborn" whose life is protected as existing from implantation in the uterus until "complete emergence ... from the body of the woman". Beginning at implantation conformed to a 2009 Supreme Court judgment on the beginning of pregnancy, rather than the Catholic view that personhood begins at conception. The aim of specifying the uterus was to avoid criminalising emergency contraception or treatment of ectopic pregnancy.

The Act empowered the Minister for Health to produce regulations detailing the procedures for all its provisions.

A "senior source" at the National Maternity Hospital (NMH) told The Irish Times that terminations had been carried out there prior to the 2013 Act, and that the change brought about by the Act would be to remove the "fear of a possible Medical Council case".

=== Approved locations ===
Except in an emergency, a termination could only be carried out in an "appropriate institution". The Act listed several of these, and empowered the Minister to specify others. The draft bill's list of approved institutions included only maternity hospitals, but was extended to include other hospitals with intensive care units where the nearest maternity hospital did not have emergency medicine facilities.

Dublin

- Beaumont Hospital
- Coombe Women & Infants University Hospital
- Mater Misericordiae University Hospital
- National Maternity Hospital
- Rotunda Hospital
- St. James's Hospital
- St. Vincent's University Hospital
- Tallaght University Hospital

Provincial

- Cavan General Hospital
- Cork University Hospital and Cork University Maternity Hospital
- Galway University Hospitals
- Kerry General Hospital, Tralee
- Letterkenny General Hospital
- Mayo General Hospital, Castlebar
- Midland Regional Hospital, Mullingar
- Midland Regional Hospital, Portlaoise
- Mid-Western Regional Hospital, Dooradoyle
- Mid-Western Regional Maternity Hospital, Limerick
- Our Lady of Lourdes Hospital, Drogheda
- Portiuncula Hospital, Ballinasloe
- Sligo General Hospital
- St Luke's Hospital, Kilkenny
- Tipperary University Hospital, Clonmel
- Waterford Regional Hospital
- Wexford General Hospital

== Enactment ==
The bill was drafted by the Government and then introduced by it into the Oireachtas or parliament. After both Houses of the Oireachtas passed it, it was signed into law by the President.

=== Draft ===
In January 2013, the Oireachtas Joint Committee on Health and Children held three days of discussions with interest groups on the government's plans. The meeting was held in the chamber of the Seanad, rather than a committee room, to allow more people to attend. Journalist Stephen Collins commented that it was an unusual and positive step to hold such a discussion before the drafting of a bill by the Office of the Parliamentary Counsel to Government. Health Minister James Reilly said in January 2014 that the process had "become now the standard for many bills".

The draft of the bill was published in April 2013. The official announcement stated that the provisions of the proposed legislation being published were strictly within the parameters of the X Case. In May 2013, the Oireachtas Joint Committee on Health and Children held three days of discussions on the draft bill with healthcare and legal professionals. Its report was laid before the Dáil on 30 May.

=== Dáil stages ===
The bill was introduced in Dáil Éireann, the lower House of the Oireachtas, on 16 June 2013. It was the subject of vigorous debate. From the government parties, TDs Terence Flanagan, Peter Mathews, Billy Timmins, and Brian Walsh were expelled from the Fine Gael parliamentary party on 2 July 2013 after voting against the bill's second stage in defiance of a party whip. Lucinda Creighton was likewise expelled on 11 July for voting against the bill's report stage; she was also forced to resign as Minister of State for European Affairs. Michael McNamara of Labour also voted against the bill, but the party later explained this had been a mistake. From the opposition parties, Peadar Tóibín was suspended by Sinn Féin for six months after voting no against the whip. While Fianna Fáil leader Micheál Martin favoured the bill, the party's TDs demanded a free vote, and 13 of 19 voted against. This contributed to media reports that Martin's continued leadership of the party was in doubt.

Six pro-choice technical group TDs voted against the bill: Clare Daly, Joan Collins, Richard Boyd Barrett, Mick Wallace, Joe Higgins and Luke 'Ming' Flanagan. They argued instead for a referendum to repeal the 1983 Constitutional amendment which places the life of the mother and the unborn on an equal footing. Boyd Barrett criticised the exclusion of fatal foetal abnormality in the bill, which he said “will force women whose pregnancies will inevitably end in tragedy to go full term or travel overseas for terminations".

At the bill's report stage, 165 amendments were proposed. Faced with such a large number, the government decided to let the debate run over the originally allocated time, rather than using a guillotine motion to curtail it. Such a motion might have prevented discussion of the bill's most contentious sections, thereby increasing controversy. The report stage began at 11.50am on 10 July, and was adjourned at 5am the following morning.

At about 2.40am, as deputies were awaiting a division, Tom Barry pulled Áine Collins, a fellow Fine Gael TD for Cork East, onto his lap. Barry apologised publicly and was reprimanded by Fine Gael. He admitted having drunk alcohol before the incident but denied being drunk. Some politicians called for an end to the practice of the Oireachtas members' private bar remaining open and serving alcohol whenever Oireachtas business is being conducted.

Debate resumed at 5pm that evening, and concluded with the final vote at 12.25am on the morning of 12 July. The bill was finally approved by 127 votes to 31.

=== Seanad stages ===
Six days were set aside for the bill's passage through the Seanad. It was introduced on Monday 15 July 2013 and passed its second stage the next day by 41 votes to 15. The No voters were: 10 of the 14 Fianna Fáil senators; independents Feargal Quinn and Rónán Mullen; Taoiseach's nominee Mary Ann O'Brien; and Fidelma Healy Eames and Paul Bradford, who lost the Fine Gael whip. Jim Walsh quoted an anti-abortion pamphlet's description of dilation and evacuation, which the bill's supporters criticised as inappropriate. Fianna Fáil's Brian Ó Domhnaill claimed that allowing abortions in the case of foetal anomalies would deprive Ireland of future Special Olympics athletes. He also remarked that babies with Down's syndrome could be "left to die on sterilised trays". The bill passed its final stage unamended on 23 July 2013, by 39 votes to 14. If the Seanad had rejected or amended the bill, the Dáil would have had to be recalled from its summer recess to consider the Seanad's changes.

=== President ===
A bill passed by both Houses of the Oireachtas is sent to the President of Ireland to be signed into law. There were suggestions that the Seanad might petition President Michael D. Higgins to call an ordinary referendum on the bill.

Paschal Donohoe suggested Higgins might refer the bill to the Supreme Court under Article 26 of the Constitution, to test whether it is constitutional. The President is required to summon a meeting of the Council of State before any referral, and on 24 July he called such a meeting for 29 July. Of the 24 members of the Council, 21 attended. Of the three absentees, Mary Robinson and John Bruton both made written submissions; the third, Albert Reynolds, had Alzheimer's disease. A bill allowed by the Supreme Court under Article 26 can never subsequently have its constitutionality challenged in court. News reports suggested that, for this reason, most members of the Council advised the President not to refer the bill, to allow the Supreme Court to consider it in the light of specific future cases rather than abstract hypothetical cases. Higgins had until 31 July 2013 to either sign or refer the bill; in the event, he signed it on 30 July without referral.

== Debate ==
The bill was criticised by commentators on both sides of the Irish abortion debate, both for being too restrictive, and for not being restrictive enough.

Jurist Gerry Whyte listed and critiqued five hypothetical grounds on which the Act could be argued to be unconstitutional: the lack of explicit time limits; the lack of an opt-out for institutions (as opposed to individuals) with conscience objections; the fact that a refused abortion can be appealed but an allowed abortion cannot; the lack of allowance for fatal foetal abnormality; and the possibility that the X-case judgment is not binding with regard to allowing suicide as grounds.

The Irish Catholic Bishops' Conference wrote a series of pastoral letters condemning the bill. In May 2013, Fine Gael TD Tom Barry wrote to Cardinal Seán Brady and the nuncio, Charles John Brown, asking whether TDs would be excommunicated if they voted for the bill. Derek Keating's parish priest stopped him serving as minister of the Eucharist after he voted for the Act.

Anti-abortion commentators criticised the bill's lack of time limits. Breda O'Brien suggested doctors might induce labour of a borderline-viable fetus, resulting in permanent health problems associated with premature birth. Rónán Mullen suggested the prospect of medical malpractice lawsuits from such births might make doctors prefer late-term abortion instead.

Professor Fiona de Londras objected to the criteria for establishing risk being more onerous for suicide than for physical illness.

== Implementation ==
While the bill was still in progress, the Department of Health published drafts of the Statutory Instruments for regulations to be introduced by the Minister for Health. Separate regulations deal with certification of appropriate institutions, reporting of procedures performed, and application for review of refused termination.

On 7 August 2013, Kevin Doran, a priest on the board of governors of Mater Misericordiae University Hospital, told The Irish Times it could not comply with the Act because of its Catholic ethos, while a hospital spokesperson said it had not yet formulated a policy on the Act. Senator John Crown expressed his anger at the comments and said "serious questions have to be asked" on hospital board governance and suggested that religious institutions had retained management control of hospitals, whilst divesting of assets to so they could not be touched during abuse claims. He said that "fundamental reform" of hospitals we needed to enable freedom of choice of hospital (including where religious hospitals could have their own roles), but expressed concerns that the planned hospital would reduce options.

The Irish Times suggested that it was permissible for the Mater to opt out of the Act, due to the deletion from the bill of an explicit requirement for approved institutions to facilitate terminations.

While Minister for Health James Reilly declined to comment as the hospital board had not met yet, a spokesperson for the Department of Health signposted to Reilly's comments during the debate on the Act. He had provided two reasons why there was no right to refuse. These were that the Act did not contain a right "for conscientious objection by institutions" which "is limited to persons involved in the delivery of the treatment only", with a duty to ensure that another colleague takes over the patient care and that publicly funded hospitals could not refuse services to patients which were provided for under law.

The board held a four-hour meeting on 17 September, and announced on 24 September that it would comply with the Act. Doran resigned from the board, while a nun on the board said the hospital "would not be performing abortions. This is a matter of how we deal with complicated situations." She expressed uncertainty about future decisions.

A spokesperson for St. Vincent's University Hospital, which had Religious Sisters of Charity management, said in August it would "be following the law of the land". The other approved hospitals were managed by the HSE, and so provided facilities as a matter of course.

The Irish Times reported on 23 August 2013 that the first abortion under the terms of the Act had been performed several weeks earlier at the NMH. In fact, although the act had been passed, it had not commenced. The NMH story was investigated for possible breach of information privacy law. On 31 August, The Irish Times withdrew its story and stated "the case described in the article did not happen".

The Department of Health stated that commencement of the Act would not occur until the finalisation of the regulations required to implement its provisions. The department established an expert committee comprising twelve people, including ten medical specialists. It first met on 24 September 2013 and was originally expected to report within three months. One task was appointing doctors to the review and appeals panels required by the Act, which was accomplished by December. On 19 December 2013, Minister Reilly signed several statutory instruments: those specifying regulations for certification, review, and notification of decisions, and a commencement order specifying 1 January 2014 as the date the Act and regulations would come into force.

Separate from the administrative regulations are the clinical guidelines for physicians to determine whether a given case met the legal criteria specified by the Act. These were not in place when the Act commenced. There was criticism of the decision to commence the Act and regulations before the guidelines have been established. The College of Psychiatrists advised members not to participate in assessments for risk of loss of life from suicide until the guidelines had been published. The Irish Times reported in January 2014 that the guidelines were being drafted by the Medical Council; on 3 July 2014 it reported that they had been drawn up by the Department of Health and circulated to healthcare professionals. In August 2014 media reported on "Ms Y", who in July had a Caesarean section after 24 weeks' gestation, despite having requested an abortion and being suicidal. A revised version of the June guidelines was published on 19 September 2014. The Irish Times commented that the guidelines differed from those circulated in July, and "appear to go further than the Act in prescribing C-section and early induction"; Minister for Health Leo Varadkar denied the "Ms Y" case had influenced them.

ON 29 October 2014, the Government made a submission to the Council of Europe on its response to the A, B and C v Ireland judgment, summarizing the Act and ensuing regulations and publicity, and stating that the Health Service Executive would be producing a patient information leaflet for women. On 4 December 2014, the Council's Committee of Ministers closed the case as resolved.

The first annual report on the Act's operation, covering the calendar year 2014, was laid before the Dáil on 29 June 2015 by the Minister for Health. The report revealed that in 2014 there had been 26 terminations in the state under the Act's provisions, of which three were on grounds of risk of suicide.

Annual reports of notifications in accordance with the Protection of Life During Pregnancy Act 2013
For year	Report date	Number of terminations by risk				Appeals		Refs
For year	Report date	Suicide	Emergency	Other illness	Total	Made	Upheld	Refs
2014	29 June 2015	3	9	14	26	1	0	
2015	29 June 2016	3	9	14	26	1	1	
2016	29 June 2017	1	16	8	25	1	1	
2017	28 June 2018	2	5	8	15	1	1	
2018	27 June 2019	1	13	18	32	0	0	

In 2017, news media reported the case of an adolescent who was detained for several days under the Mental Health Act by the District Court on the evidence of psychiatrist that her distress at being pregnant placed her at risk of suicide. The girl had asked for a termination and became agitated upon discovering she was being transferred to a mental health unit rather than to an abortion facility. She was discharged after a psychiatrist employed by her guardian ad litem found "no evidence of a mental health disorder". Pro-choice advocates said the incident highlighted the deficiencies of the 2013 act. The Irish Times quoted psychiatrists describing the act as "unworkable" or "a lottery".

== Repeal ==
In February 2015, Clare Daly's private member's bill, to amend the 2013 act to allow abortion in cases of fatal foetal abnormality, was rejected in the Dáil; the government argued that the bill was unconstitutional, which Daly disputed. The Protection of Life During Pregnancy (Amendment) Bill 2017, introduced by pro-choice TDs from AAA–PBP and the Green Party, proposed to reduce the prescribed punishment for "unlawful destruction of human life" from the maximum 14-year prison sentence specified in the 2013 Act to a fine of up to €1. The intention was to provide minimal compliance with the constitutional requirement to outlaw abortion while removing any deterrent effect. The bill was rejected by the Fine Gael–independent coalition, that the bill was unconstitutional as the new penalty would not "defend and vindicate" the unborn's right to life "as far as practicable". Simon Harris, the Minister for Health, said, "The clear advice of the Attorney General, which I am sharing with the House, is that this Bill fails to discharge the State's obligations under Article 40.3.3° of the Constitution and would, if passed, be likely to be subject to immediate successful legal challenge." The Dáil resolved to decline a second reading for the bill and to wait for the Citizens' Assembly to report on the 8th Amendment.

The Citizens' Assembly voted on 22 April 2017 to recommend replacing the text of Article 40.3.3° with a mandate for the Oireachtas to regulate terminations. The recommendation was formally reported to the Oireachtas on 29 June 2017, and effected by the 36th Amendment of the Constitution, approved at a referendum on 25 May 2018 by 66.4% of voters, and signed into law on 18 September 2018. The Health (Regulation of Termination of Pregnancy) Act 2018 was then enacted by the Oireachtas. It repealed the 2013 Act while re-enacting a similar regulatory framework for terminations between 12 weeks' gestation and viability, which are permitted for "a risk to the life, or of serious harm to the health, of the pregnant woman". The 2018 Act also permits terminations before 12 weeks for any reason, and at any time for fatal foetal abnormality. The 2018 Act was signed into law on 20 December 2018 and commenced on 1 January 2019, whereupon the 2013 Act was repealed.

== See also ==
- Abortion in the Republic of Ireland
- Eighth Amendment of the Constitution of Ireland
- Twenty-fifth Amendment of the Constitution Bill 2001
- Death of Savita Halappanavar
- Ms Y
- A, B and C v Ireland
