= Death of Savita Halappanavar =

Woman who died from sepsis from being denied an abortion in Ireland

Savita Halappanavar
- ಸವಿತಾ ಹಾಲಪ್ಪನವರ್ Savitā Hālappanavar
- Born: Savita Andanappa Yalagi; 9 September 1981; Bagalkot, India
- Died: 28 October 2012 (aged 31); Galway, Ireland
- Cause of death: Sepsis
- Burial place: Belgaum, India
- Education: Maratha Mandal Dental College; KLE University
- Occupation: Dentist
- Known for: Protection of Life During Pregnancy Act 2013
- Spouse: Praveen Halappanavar (m. 2008)
- Parents: Andanappa Yalagi (father); Akhmedevi Yalagi (mother)

Savita Halappanavar (née Savita Andanappa Yalagi; 9 September 1981 – 28 October 2012) was a dentist of Indian origin, living in Ireland, who died from sepsis after her request for an abortion after a prolonged miscarriage was denied on legal grounds. In the wake of a nationwide outcry over her death, Irish voters passed in a landslide the Thirty-Sixth Amendment of the Constitution, which repealed the Eighth Amendment and empowered the Oireachtas to make abortion legal. It did so through the Health (Regulation of Termination of Pregnancy) Act of 20 December 2018.

== Death ==
=== Summary of events ===
On 21 October 2012, Halappanavar, then 17 weeks pregnant, was examined at University Hospital Galway after complaining of back pain, but was soon discharged without a diagnosis. She returned to the hospital later that day, this time complaining of lower pressure, a sensation she described as feeling "something coming down", and a subsequent examination found that the gestational sac was protruding from her cervix. She was admitted to hospital, as it was determined that miscarriage was unavoidable, and several hours later, just after midnight on 22 October, her water broke but did not expel the fetus. The following day, on 23 October, Halappanavar discussed abortion with her consulting physician but her request was promptly refused, as Irish law at that time forbade abortion if a foetal heartbeat was still present, with her midwife furthermore stating that "Ireland is a Catholic country". Halappanavar developed sepsis and, despite doctors' efforts to treat her, had a cardiac arrest at 1:09 a.m. on 28 October, and died, aged 31.

=== Early reactions ===
After her death, a coroner's inquest was held, finding that she died of medical misadventure. The Health Service Executive (HSE) and Health Information and Quality Authority (HIQA) conducted an investigation. Both criticized the team for not diagnosing the sepsis soon enough and for not using already-standard screening tools for detecting and managing maternal sepsis; for poor keeping of medical records, poor communication at shift changes, and failure to notify staff with needed expertise. The administration of the hospital was also criticized for the poor system in which the team failed. They made recommendations about training and policies for the hospital locally along with a number of national recommendations, including the creation of a laboratory system to coordinate a national response to emerging microbial threats. The HSE also recommended changes to the legal situation and training of doctors about the law.

The law in force at the time stated that the act of abortion, where continuing the pregnancy posed no immediate physiological threat to the woman's life, was a criminal offence punishable by life imprisonment. Following a ruling of the Supreme Court of Ireland in 1992 (the X Case), terminations are allowed where "a pregnant woman's life is at risk because of pregnancy, including the risk of suicide". However at the time of Halappanavar's death, there was legal uncertainty regarding the precise circumstances when this exception was allowed, as the matter had not been enacted in legislation.

On 3 November 2012, friends and family of the Halappanavars contacted local abortion rights groups (Galway Pro-Choice) to find out what they could do, with dozens meeting in person on the 6th. Galway Pro-Choice put them in contact with The Irish Times journalist Kitty Holland on 7 November. Abortion rights groups then organised on the Irish Choice Network (ICN) email group before the story broke.

Halappanavar's death became public knowledge on 13 November 2012 when the TV programme Tonight with Vincent Browne showed front-page stories that The Irish Times and the Irish Independent had planned for the next day. This resulted in the news being disseminated on Twitter, including tweets by journalists Caitlin Moran and India Knight, and coverage by publications such as BBC News, the British edition of The Huffington Post, The Guardian, The Daily Telegraph, the Daily Mirror, and The Independent newspapers.

On 14 November, more than 2,000 people gathered in her memory to protest against Ireland's abortion laws outside the Dáil in Dublin. In addition, candle-light vigils were held in Cork and Belfast the following day. The evening before the news story broke, the government's expert committee on abortion had handed in its report on the A, B and C v Ireland judgement to the Department of Health. Halappanavar's death led to protests in Galway, particularly from the local Indian community. The Daily Mirror reported that the University Hospital was the subject of several investigations. Halappanavar had been one of the organisers of the annual Galway Diwali festival, which was cancelled in response to her death.

There were calls upon the Taoiseach to start an external enquiry. There were also calls for a change in the law, as the legislation in effect at the time was an Act of the British Parliament of 1861 – when Ireland was part of the United Kingdom – which declared that it was unlawful to "procure a miscarriage". On 16 November, the Irish Health Service Executive established an independent inquiry into the circumstances surrounding Halappanavar's death.

On Saturday 17 November, the Garda Síochána (Ireland's national police) estimated that between ten and twelve thousand protesters marched from Parnell Square to Merrion Square to demand a change in the law, with other rallies across Ireland and many other countries. The Gardaí announced that they were assisting the coroner in the investigation. Medical terminations had previously been performed at the University Hospital when complications arose in pregnancy, as it is permitted by Irish law to save the life of the woman.

On Monday 19 November, the Roman Catholic bishops of Ireland met in response to Halappanavar's death and released a statement that the Catholic Church believes in the "equal and inalienable right to life of a mother and her unborn child" and that the Church has never taught that the life of an unborn child takes precedence over the mother.

=== Response from the medical community ===
The staff of University Hospital as well as members of Ireland's Health Services Executive (HSE) Regional Health Forum stated that there is no "Catholic ethos" affecting treatment.

Dr Sam Coulter-Smith, a prominent obstetrics and gynaecology physician, said that current standards of care were legally unclear, saying, "We really do need legislation in this area, otherwise we're going to be at risk of doctors working outside the law, and that's not appropriate." Dr Rhona Mahony, Master of the National Maternity Hospital, said: "It is very disappointing that, 20 years after the 'X-Case', we don't have legislation" and that women "need to know that they are going to get the appropriate health care that they need" while doctors "need to know that they are also protected in their ability to do their job". Peter Boylan, of the Irish Institute of Obstetricians and Gynecologists, said: "The current situation is like a sword of Damocles hanging over us. If we do something with a good intention, but it turns out to be illegal, the consequences are extremely serious for medical practitioners."

Microbiologist James Clair stated in a letter to the IrishExaminer that the "main problem is being missed" in the case, suggesting that the real issue may be that the sepsis was caused by extended-spectrum beta-lactamase positive gram negative bacteria (ESBL), which "are now spreading rapidly within the Irish population" and are resistant to many known antibiotic treatments.

=== Political response in 2012 ===
A week after the story broke, Taoiseach Enda Kenny stated, "I don't think we should say anything about this until we are in possession of all the facts."

Minister for Health James Reilly said that the public must not pre-judge the situation and that he was awaiting the results of the investigations, adding he had no evidence of a "Catholic ethos" at the University Hospital that prevented Halappanavar's life from being saved by a medical termination. He also stated that an inquiry into Halappanavar's death must stand up to international scrutiny. On 18 December, after a panel of experts submitted its report to the parliament recommending that "the government legislate the issue in order to clarify what the current laws actually do and do not permit", Reilly stated, "We will clarify in legislation and regulation what is available by way of treatment to a woman when a pregnancy gives rise to a threat to a woman's life."

Brian Walsh, a Fine Gael TD for Galway West, said that Galway University Hospital had carried out terminations in recent years in accordance with the judgment in the X Case and the guidelines of the Irish Medical Council. He said that the University Hospital was not run or managed by any (Catholic) religious orders and did not have a "Catholic ethos".

Fianna Fáil leader Micheál Martin said that Halappanavar's death was tragic and harrowing. Martin said that Ireland had always prioritised a low death rate during pregnancy, but that this was "cold comfort" to Halappanavar and her surviving family. He called for an independent inquiry with experts from outside the country to establish the full circumstances. On 17 November he said that "legislating for the X Case would not have stopped [the death of Savita Halappanavar]".

=== Response of abortion rights organisations in 2012 ===
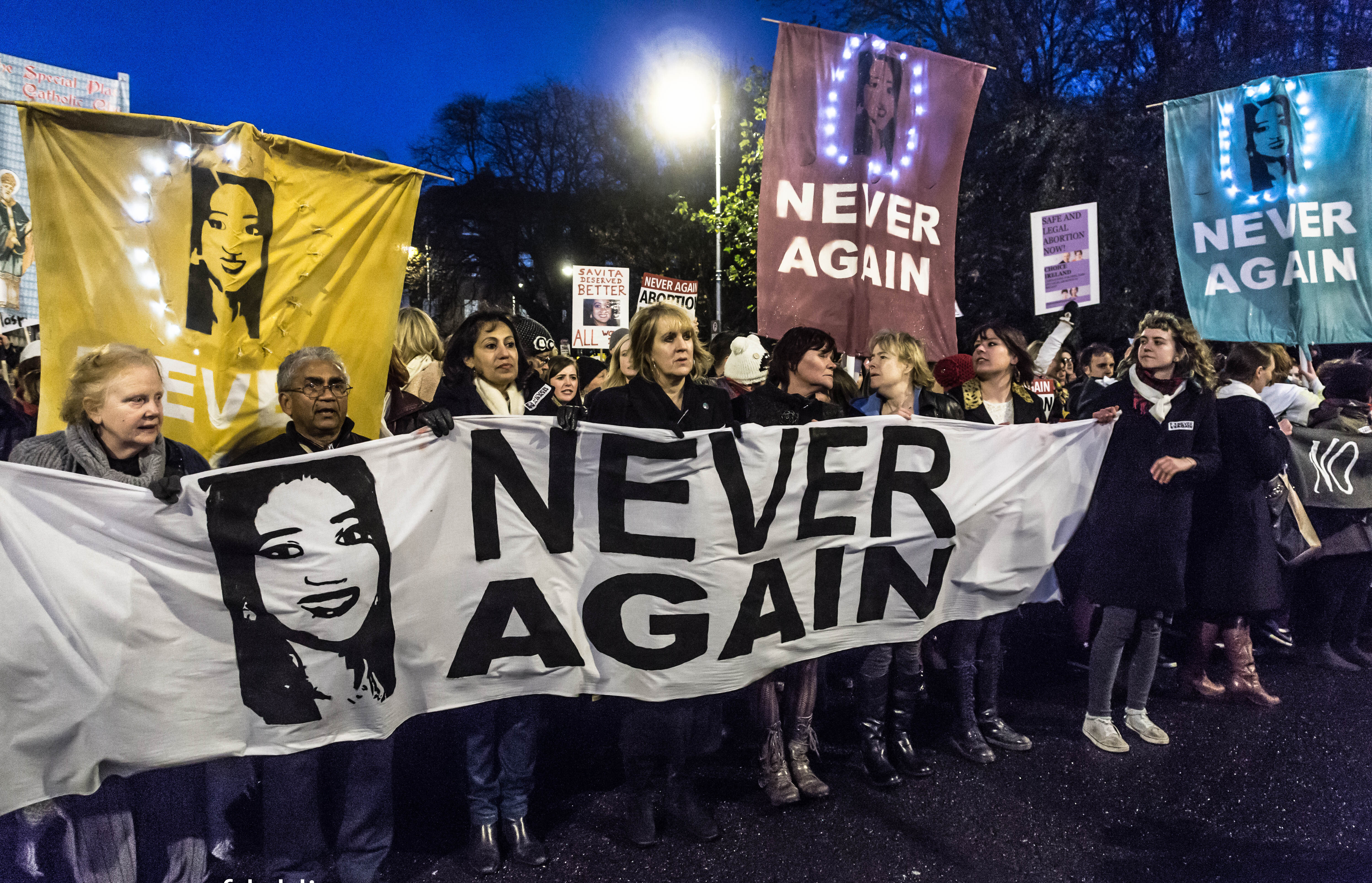
Pro-choice campaigners holding a rally in remembrance of Halappanavar in Dublin in November 2012

Abortion rights campaigners highlighted at the time that the lack of legislation clarifying the limited circumstances in which abortion is legal in Ireland contributed to Halappanavar's death. Several rallies and vigils were organised nationwide, calling for the Irish government to legislate in relation to abortion on the basis of the X Case case. Campaigners argued that legislation remained outstanding at the time of Halappanavar's death despite the European Court of Human Rights having instructed the state to clarify its laws on abortion after finding in A, B and C v Ireland (2010) that Ireland had violated the Convention by failing to provide an accessible and effective procedure by which a woman can have established whether she qualifies for a legal abortion under current Irish law.

Irish Choice Network allegedly emailed members, calling for an emergency meeting to discuss how to proceed with this "major news story".

In response to critics accusing abortion rights activists of exploiting Halappanavar's death, Kate Smurthwaite responded in a column in The Huffington Post titled "Yes, Savita Halappanavar's Death IS a Political Issue" in which she stated, "If I am ever a victim of an unjust legal discrepancy that infringes my human rights and leads to my untimely and unnecessary agonising death I want every man, woman and child on the streets immediately demanding that it never, ever be allowed to happen again."

=== Response of anti-abortion organisations in 2012 ===
The Life Institute in Ireland accused "abortion campaigners" of exploiting Halappanavar's death to further the abortion rights agenda.

Michael Kelly of The Catholic World Report rejected claims that Ireland's abortion laws led to Halappanavar's death, writing that "medical experts and bioethicists have been quick to express their view that Ireland's ban on abortion had nothing to do with Mrs. Halappanavar's death. They insist that guidelines from the Irish Medical Council are perfectly clear that pregnant women must be given all necessary medical treatment." Father Shenan J. Boquet, president of Human Life International, said that there was no evidence to indicate that "a Catholic ethos" prevented responsible treatment of the mother, and called news reports that that was the case "demonizing the Church's position on abortion". He described the debate resulting from the event as "activism masquerading as compassion and moral outrage".

=== International response ===
There were protests outside the Irish embassies in London, Berlin and Brussels.

In India, Minister for External Affairs Salman Khurshid recalled the Indian ambassador to Ireland, Debashish Chakravarti, for deliberations over the issue. Chakravarti later met Eamon Gilmore, Ireland's Tánaiste and foreign minister, and promised to keep Halappanavar's husband up to date with the government's response. Rajeev Chandrasekhar, an independent member of the Rajya Sabha (the upper house of the Parliament of India) said, "The death of Savita Halappanavar should be pursued by family and Govt. of India as a case of human rights violation and murder. Instead of simply protesting, cases should be filed against the Govt. of Ireland and its leadership at the International Court of justice and United Nations Commission for Human Rights (UNHCR). This should move beyond protesting to where people are brought to account!"

In an editorial on 17 November 2012, The Times of India said, "There appears to be a tendency to view this issue in terms of India versus Ireland or the Catholic faith against other religions. To fall prey to such tendencies would be a serious mistake and a great disservice to the memory of Savita. ... Adding a nationalist or communal tone to the debate detracts from the merit of argument rather than enhancing it."

Amnesty International stated that Halappanavar's death "illustrates [the] gap in Irish law" and asked the government of Ireland to change the law on abortion "in line with international human rights laws". The executive director of Amnesty International in Ireland, Colm O'Gorman, said that "successive Irish Governments have failed in their duty to provide necessary clarity on how this right is protected and vindicated, leaving women in Ireland in a very vulnerable position."

== HSE inquiry 2012 ==
On 19 November 2012, the HSE named Professor Sir Sabaratnam Arulkumaran to head a seven-member panel looking into the case. Arulkumaran was the head of obstetrics and gynaecology at St George's Hospital Medical School and president-elect of the International Federation of Gynaecology and Obstetrics. The panel sought to uncover all the facts and "to identify any safety issues arising in this case".

On 20 November 2012, three members of the panel were asked to step down when Savita Halappanavar's husband, Praveen Halappanavar, indicated that he would not cooperate with the panel due to their connections as consultants to University Hospital. Arulkumaran requested a meeting with Mr. Halappanavar. On 21 November, the Irish Independent reported that Arulkumaran was being accused of promoting a "pro-abortion" approach in papers that he had published.

=== Arulkumaran report ===
The Arulkumaran report was published on 13 June 2013. It identified three "Key Causal Factors" for the death: inadequate assessment and monitoring; failure to offer all management options to a patient; and non-adherence to clinical guidelines related to the prompt and effective management of sepsis. It made six recommendations for improvements in patient care in such situations. Most recommendations called for improvements in healthcare guidelines, training and practices, and one recommendation called for legislative changes if necessary to allow for expediting delivery for clinical purposes. Additionally, it made three recommendations to address incidental factors.

=== Key causal factors ===
The report indicates the first key causal factor was inadequate assessment and monitoring which would have allowed medical staff to recognise and respond to indicators that the infection was causing a deterioration in Halappanavar's condition. Additionally, staff failed to devise a plan of care recognising that (1) the infection was the most likely cause of the patient's miscarriage, and (2) with increase in time following admission, and the rupture of the patient's membranes, the risk of infection and sepsis increases.

The second factor was the hospital's failure to offer all management options to the patient. The panel points out that the patient was "experiencing inevitable miscarriage of an early second trimester pregnancy where the risk to the mother increased with time from the time that membranes were ruptured."

The panel found that hospital staff failed to adhere to clinical guidelines on severe sepsis and septic shock, calling for timely and effective management after first diagnosis.

In reviewing the care given to Halappanavar in light of clinical guidelines, the panel wrote:

Rupture of membranes may be caused by infection and vomiting indicates that the patient was unwell increasing the possibility of infection becoming systemic to causing sepsis. At interview, clinicians indicated that their management decisions were guided by the Royal College of Obstetricians and Gynaecologists Green-top guidelines [...]. The patient was commenced on erythromycin at 22.00 hrs on the 22^{nd} of October. [...] Erythromycin has also been shown to delay delivery which is beneficial in the management of preterm pre-labour rupture of the membranes but not in cases of inevitable miscarriage.

The appropriate management of spontaneous rupture of the membranes in cases of inevitable miscarriage where infection is a possible underlying cause is somewhat different to the appropriate management of Preterm Pre-labour Rupture of the Membranes where the incidence of infection at presentation is lower and the survival of the fetus is more likely.

There are no accepted clear local, national or international guidelines on the management of inevitable early second trimester miscarriage (i.e., less than 24 weeks) including the management of miscarriage where there is prolonged rupture of the membranes. The reason for the absence of such guidelines may be that clinical practice in other jurisdictions would have led to an early termination of pregnancy in equivalent clinical circumstances. It is recommended that such guidelines be developed for such patients as a matter of urgency and they should be explicit in the guidance given as to when one should offer termination based on symptoms and signs of infection implying increasing health risk to the mother which may even threaten her life.

We recognise that such guidelines must be consistent with applicable law and that the guidance so urged may require legal change.

=== Recommendations of the Panel ===
1. Prompt introduction of a Maternity Early Warning Scoring Systems Chart for patients with pregnancy complications in gynaecology wards. This should be followed by a compliance audit. The chart should indicate a monitoring coupled with an escalating nursing, medical and multidisciplinary response.
2. Introduction of mandatory induction and education on early recognition, monitoring and management of infection and sepsis. This includes severe sepsis and septic shock.
3. Development and implementation of national guidelines relating to infection and pregnancy, in addition to multidisciplinary educational programmes to improve care in such cases. In particular, there needs to be audited compliance with guidelines on management of infection, sepsis, and suspected sepsis in cases of inevitable miscarriage of an early second trimester pregnancy. This includes when there is a prolonged rupture of membranes, and increasing time from this point increases the risk to the mother.
4. Two sub-recommendations:
  1. Compliance with guidelines on the management of early second trimester inevitable miscarriage. This should recognise possible rapid patient deterioration, possibly within a few hours, from sepsis to severe sepsis to septic shock. It should also recognise the high mortality rate, of up to 60 percent, associated with this. These guidelines should include the same emphases as those for infection and pregnancy listed in recommendation 3. The panel recommended such guidelines should include guidelines relating to expediting delivery for clinical reasons, including "medical and surgical termination" based on the expertise available and legal feasibility.
  2. Clear statement of the legal context in which clinical professional judgement can be exercised in the best medical welfare interests of patients. The Oireachtas should consider the law including any necessary constitutional change and related administrative, legal and clinical guidelines in relation to the management of inevitable miscarriage in the early second trimester of a pregnancy.
5. The panel recommended improved communication practices between all relevant staff, and improvements in handover of acutely ill patients. Additionally, definitive tools for clearly communicating information relating to the deterioration of a woman's condition, consultation and/or handover to a higher level of care, according to "Improving patient handover" (RCOG Good Practice No.12, Dec 2010).
6. Compliance of guidelines on the consultants' responsibilities, according to the Royal College of Obstetricians and Gynaecologists, "Responsibility of the consultant on call" (RCOG Good Practice No.8, March 2009). These indicate the need to involve senior medical staff due to difficulty coping with case load, or to consult on suspected serious cases. Midwives and nurses should be able to obtain help from senior nurse midwifery managers or the director of nursing on duty, and need to be able to contact the consultant if needed.

=== Subsequent comments by Sabaratnam Arulkumaran ===
In 2017, Arulkumaran commented that a significant contributing factor to Halappanavar's death was Ireland's restrictive abortion laws.

== HIQA report ==
The Health Information and Quality Authority (HIQA) published a report into the incident on 9 October 2013. It found "following the rupture of her membranes, four-hourly observations including temperature, heart rate, respiration and blood pressure did not appear to have been carried out at the required intervals", noting "that though UHG [University Hospital Galway] had a guideline in place for the management of suspected sepsis and sepsis in obstetric care, the clinical governance arrangements were "not robust enough to ensure adherence to this guideline".

== Aftermath ==
Partly in response to the protest movement after the death of Savita Halappanavar, the Irish government introduced the Protection of Life During Pregnancy Act 2013. Having passed both Houses of the Oireachtas in July 2013, it was signed into law on 30 July by Michael D. Higgins, the President of Ireland.

On 20 September 2013, Praveen Halappanavar's solicitor served legal proceedings against Galway University Hospital and separately against Doctor Katherine Astbury. The proceedings claim that Halappanavar's constitutional right to life had been breached and allege 30 issues of medical negligence.

By May 2014, Praveen Halappanavar had emigrated from Ireland to the United States. On 10 March 2016, Praveen Halappanavar settled the case with the HSE, after the HSE agreed to a confidential, six-figure cash settlement.

Abortion law continued to be an issue of heated political debate. In 2016-17 the Irish government convened a Citizens' Assembly to advise about the Eighth Amendment.

A speech by John Waters at the 2017 Renua conference resulted in Kitty Holland suing him for libel, and in 2024 being awarded €35,000 damages plus costs. Waters had said that to claim the refusal of an abortion had caused Halappanavar's death was "a lie that resulted in the journalist who started the lie getting multiple awards from her colleagues". Waters argued in court that 'he was not saying Ms Holland lied but that she was the "initiator of a process" that "at some indeterminate point along its trajectory became a lie"', and that she had been "badly served" by her editors. The judge ruled Waters' words were "a serious attack on [Holland's] professional integrity".

On 20 May 2018, the parents of Halappanavar called for a Yes vote in Ireland's referendum on the repeal of the Eighth Amendment, with her father saying, "I hope the people of Ireland will vote yes for abortion, for the ladies of Ireland and the people of Ireland. My daughter, she lost her life because of this abortion law, because of the diagnosis, and she could not have an abortion. She died." On 25 May 2018, the people of Ireland voted Yes to repeal the Eighth Amendment by a margin of 2 to 1.

On 30 September 2018, an open letter by Emma Watson to Halappanavar was published in Porter magazine.

== See also ==
- Sheila Hodgers
- PP v. HSE
- Indians in Ireland
