= Pro-Life Amendment Campaign =

The Pro-Life Amendment Campaign (PLAC) was an anti-abortion advocacy organisation established in Ireland in 1981. It campaigned in favour of the Eighth Amendment of the Constitution of Ireland, which was approved by referendum on 7 September 1983 and signed into law on the 7 October of the same year.

== Membership ==
The organisation set up several other organisations:

- Congress of Catholic Secondary School Parents' Associations
- Irish Catholic Doctors' Guild
- Guild of Catholic Nurses
- Guild of Catholic Pharmacists
- Catholic Young Men's Society
- St Thomas More Society
- Irish Pro-Life Movement
- National Association of the Ovulation Method
- Council of Social Concern (COSC)
- Irish Responsible Society
- Society for the Protection of Unborn Children (SPUC)
- St Joseph's Young Priests Society
- Christian Brothers Schools Parents' Federation

They attended a meeting chaired by the leader of the Knights of Saint Columbanus on 21 January 1981. The meeting was called by John O'Reilly, a former Knight of Columbanus who had campaigned against contraception and the Irish Family Planning Association in the 1970s. It was officially launched at a press conference chaired by Dr Julia Vaughan (a gynaecologist and former nun) on 27 April 1981.

Elected officers of the organisation were: Julia Vaughan (Irish Catholic Doctors' Guild, chairman), Michael Shortall (Catholic Young Men's Society, secretary), Dennis Barror (Irish Responsible Society, treasurer).

== Campaign ==
Shortly after its launch, PLAC delegations met separately with Fianna Fáil's Charlie Haughey, Fine Gael's Garret FitzGerald and the Labour Party's Frank Cluskey.

After an acrimonious referendum campaign, the amendment was passed by 67% voting in favour to 33% voting against.

== Aftermath ==
Key members of the campaign went on to establish the Pro Life Campaign in 1992.

== See also ==
- Abortion in the Republic of Ireland
- Youth Defence
