= Social & Legal Studies =

Peer-reviewed academic journal

- Discipline: Sociology
- Language: English
- Edited by: Carl F. Stychin, David Campbell, Marie B. Fox, Vanessa Munro

Publication details
- History: 1992-present
- Publisher: SAGE Publications
- Frequency: Bimonthly
- Impact factor: 1.119 (2018)

Standard abbreviations
- ISO 4: Soc. Leg. Stud.

Indexing
- CODEN: SLSTEK
- ISSN: 0964-6639 (print); 1461-7390 (web)
- LCCN: 94644509
- OCLC no.: 25566142

Links
- Journal homepage; Online access; Online archive

Social & Legal Studies is a bimonthly peer-reviewed academic journal that covers feminist, post-colonial, and socialist economic perspectives to the study of law and criminology. The editors-in-chief are Carl Stychin (University of London), David Campbell (University of Lancaster), Vanessa Munro (University of Warwick), and Marie Fox (University of Liverpool). It was established in 1992 and is published by SAGE Publications.

== Abstracting and indexing ==
The journal is abstracted and indexed in Academic Search Premier, the Legal Journals Index, Scopus, and the Social Sciences Citation Index. According to the Journal Citation Reports, the journal has a 2018 impact factor is 1.119, ranking it 39th out of 65 journals in the category "Criminology and Penology", 66 out of 148 journals in the category "Law", and 61st out of 104 journals in the category "Social Sciences, Interdisciplinary".
