= Health (Regulation of Termination of Pregnancy) Act 2018 =

Law regulating the availability of abortion in Ireland

Oireachtas
- Long title: An Act to provide for and regulate termination of pregnancy; to make provision for reviews at the instigation of a pregnant woman, or a person on her behalf, of certain medical opinions given in respect of pregnancy; to make available without charge certain services to women for the purpose of termination of pregnancy in accordance with this Act and, for that purpose, to amend the Health Act 1970 and certain other enactments; to provide for offences in respect of the intentional ending of the life of a foetus otherwise than in accordance with this Act; to amend the Bail Act 1997; to repeal the Regulation of Information (Services outside the State for Termination of Pregnancies) Act 1995, the Protection of Life During Pregnancy Act 2013 and provisions of certain other enactments; and to provide for matters connected therewith.
- Citation: Act 31 of 2018
- Considered by: 32nd Dáil
- Passed: 5 December 2018
- Considered by: 25th Seanad
- Passed: 13 December 2018
- Signed by: Michael D. Higgins
- Signed: 20 December 2018
- Commenced: 1 January 2019

Legislative history

Initiating chamber: 32nd Dáil
- Bill citation: Bill 105 of 2018
- Introduced by: Simon Harris
- Introduced: 27 September 2018
- First reading: 27 September 2018
- Second reading: 4 October 2018
- Third reading: 5 December 2018
- Committee report: 27 October 2018

Revising chamber: 25th Seanad
- Member(s) in charge: Minister for Health (Simon Harris)
- Second reading: 5 December 2018
- Third reading: 13 December 2018
- Committee report: 11 December 2018

Repeals
- Regulation of Information (Services outside the State for Termination of Pregnancies) Act 1995; Protection of Life During Pregnancy Act 2013

Keywords
- Abortion
- Status: In force

The Health (Regulation of Termination of Pregnancy) Act 2018 (Act No. 31 of 2018; previously Bill No. 105 of 2018) is an Act of the Oireachtas (Irish parliament) which defines the circumstances and processes within which abortion may be legally performed in Ireland. It permits termination under medical supervision, generally up to 12 weeks' pregnancy, and later if pregnancy poses a serious health risk or there is a fatal foetal abnormality.

Prior to 2018, abortion was legal only where pregnancy presented "a real and substantial risk to the life" of the woman, as mandated by the 1983 Eighth Amendment of the Constitution and regulated by the Protection of Life During Pregnancy Act 2013. A referendum on 25 May 2018 approved the Thirty-sixth Amendment of the Constitution, which in effect repealed the Eighth Amendment and empowered the Oireachtas to legislate for abortion. The Health (Regulation of Termination of Pregnancy) Bill was published on 27 September 2018 and signed into law on 20 December 2018. The act came into force on 1 January 2019.

== Key provisions ==
The law allows for a termination:

- under section 9, where 2 medical practitioners form the view that there is a risk to the life or of serious harm to the health of a pregnant woman, the foetus has not reached viability, and it is appropriate to carry out the termination to avert the risk;
- under section 10, in cases of emergency, where there is an immediate serious risk to the life or of serious harm to the health of a pregnant woman, after an examination by one medical practitioner;
- under section 11, where two medical practitioners are of the opinion formed in good faith that there is present a condition affecting the foetus that is likely to lead to the death of the foetus either before, or within 28 days of, birth; and
- under section 12, where a medical practitioner certifies that the pregnancy has not exceeded 12 weeks, and after a period of 3 days after this certification.

Under section 23, it is an offence punishable by a fine or imprisonment of up to 14 years to intentionally end the life of a foetus outside the provisions of the Act. This offence does not apply in the case of a woman ending her own pregnancy.

== Background ==
Prior to 2018, abortion was legal only where pregnancy presented "a real and substantial risk to the life" of the woman, as mandated by the 1983 Eighth Amendment of the Constitution and regulated by the Protection of Life During Pregnancy Act 2013.

After the 2016 general election, a Citizens' Assembly was established by Oireachtas resolution and tasked with reporting on several issues, the first being "the Eighth Amendment of the Constitution". It began discussion in November 2016 and finally voted in April 2017 on a range of questions. Its first recommendation was to replace the constitutional prohibition with a mandate for the Oireachtas to legislate on abortion. It then provided a range of recommendations for circumstances in which the Oireachtas might legislate to allow abortion.

The assembly's formal report was laid before the Oireachtas on 29 June 2017 and referred to a special Oireachtas Joint Committee for consideration. The committee met from September to December 2017 and produced its own report. It recommended repealing the constitutional prohibition, but without replacing it with a specific mandate for the Oireachtas to legislate on abortion. The committee also slightly varied the statutory regime recommended by the assembly. The assembly recommended allowing termination on grounds of rape up to 22 weeks' gestation, but the committee found that verifying rape or sexual assault risks further traumatisation of the victim and may be complex or even unworkable in practice. The committee instead recommended that termination in cases of rape be covered by the provision for termination without restriction as to reason within 12 weeks' gestation, which was recommended by the assembly. The committee's report was debated in the Dáil between 17 and 25 January 2018 and again on 21 February. Simon Harris, the Minister for Health, began by saying:

I want to recognise that the recommendations contained in the Committee’s report represent the views of the majority of members, but that there was not unanimous agreement on them. I respect the views of those who dissent from the recommendations but I do believe they are the basis on which we must proceed on this issue.

A referendum on 25 May 2018 approved the Thirty-sixth Amendment of the Constitution, which repealed the Eighth Amendment and empowered the Oireachtas to legislate for abortion. Legal challenges delayed enactment of the amendment until 18 September 2018.

== Legislative history ==
A General Scheme of a Bill to Regulate Termination of Pregnancy was published by the Department of Health in March 2018, prior to the passage of the Thirty-sixth Amendment. A second general scheme for the bill was published by the Department of Health in July 2018.

The Health (Regulation of Termination of Pregnancy) Bill was introduced into the Dáil Éireann on 27 September 2018 by the Minister for Health Simon Harris. It passed final stages in the Dáil on 5 December, where it was approved by 90 votes to 15, with 12 registered abstentions. Peadar Tóibín was suspended from Sinn Féin for defying the party whip to vote against the bill. He left the party to found Aontú.

On 13 December 2018, the bill passed final stage in Seanad Éireann by 27 votes to 5.

On 20 December 2018, the bill was signed into law by President Michael D. Higgins. On 21 December 2018, the Minister for Health issued the statutory instruments specifying the act's commencement date, and the regulations for certifications, notifications, and reviews of decisions. On 1 January 2019, the act commenced.

== Implementation ==
The first annual report on the Act's operation, covering the calendar year 2019, was laid before the Houses of the Oireachtas on 30 June 2020 by the Minister for Health. The report revealed that in 2019 there had been 6,666 terminations in the State under the Act's provisions, of which 21 were on grounds of risk to life or health.

Annual Reports of notifications in accordance with the Health (Regulation of Termination of Pregnancy) Act 2018
For year	Report date	Number of terminations by risk			Number of terminations at early pregnancy	Total	Refs
For year	Report date	Health	Emergency	Foetus	Number of terminations at early pregnancy	Total	Refs
2019	30 June 2020	21	3	100	6,542	6,666	
2020	29 June 2021	20	5	97	6,455	6,577	
2021	13 July 2022	9	2	53	4,513	4,577	
2022	22 June 2023	22	4	88	8,042	8,156	
2023	28 June 2024	21	7	129	9,876	10,033	
2024	11 July 2025	24	9	108	10,711	10,852	
2025	June 2026	25	13	117	10,445	10,600	
