= Red C =

Irish market research and polling company

Red C (stylised in all caps as RED C) is a market research and polling company in Ireland.

It is most widely known for its political opinion polling (though most of its business is market research, with several large corporate clients). The Business Post publishes a monthly Red C poll tracking the support for Irish political parties.

Red C was founded in 2003 by CEO Richard Colwell who had previously worked in London for Research International and ICM Research, followed by Lansdowne Market Research in Dublin. As at 2016, Red C Research and Marketing Ltd was owned (via holding company RSV Ventures Ltd) by its directors, with Colwell being the majority shareholder.

The company's headquarters are in East Point Business Park in Dublin. The company opened a call centre in Dundalk in 2006.
