= 2015 Irish constitutional referendums =

The government of Ireland held referendums on 22 May 2015 on two proposed amendments to the Constitution of Ireland which had been recommended by the Constitutional Convention. The amendment to permit same-sex marriage in the Republic of Ireland was approved by 62–38% of the voters. The other amendment would have reduced the age of candidacy for the President of Ireland from 35 to 21, but voters rejected it by 73–27%. A Dáil by-election in Carlow–Kilkenny was held on the same day. Other amendments were considered but not proceeded with, including reducing the voting age from 18 to 16, and sanctioning the establishment of a Unified Patent Court.

== Same-sex marriage ==
Voters were asked whether to add to the Constitution that "marriage may be contracted in accordance with law by two persons without distinction as to their sex". The proposal was supported by the Government as well as all major political parties, and was approved by 62.07% of voters.

Thirty-fourth Amendment of the Constitution Bill 2015
Choice	Votes	%
For	1,201,607	62.07
Against	734,300	37.93
Total	1,935,907	100.00
Valid votes	1,935,907	99.29
Invalid/blank votes	13,818	0.71
Total votes	1,949,725	100.00
Registered voters/turnout	3,221,681	60.52

== Presidential candidacy age ==
Voters rejected a proposal to reduce the age of eligibility to run for president from 35 to 21 by a 73% to 27% margin.

Thirty-fifth Amendment of the Constitution Bill 2015
Choice	Votes	%
For	520,898	26.94
Against	1,412,602	73.06
Total	1,933,500	100.00
Valid votes	1,933,500	99.18
Invalid/blank votes	15,938	0.82
Total votes	1,949,438	100.00
Registered voters/turnout	3,221,681	60.51
