= Mellet v Ireland =

UNHRC Abortion report concerning Ireland

Mellet v Ireland is a finding from the United Nations Human Rights Committee in 2016 that Ireland's abortion laws violated human rights and the International Covenant on Civil and Political Rights by banning abortion in cases of fatal foetal abnormality and by forcing Amanda Mellet to travel to the United Kingdom for an abortion.

== Background ==
=== Amanda Mellet ===
Amanda Mellet became pregnant in 2011. In November 2011, in the 21st week of pregnancy, a routine scans in the Rotunda Hospital showed the foetus was suffering Edwards syndrome, a fatal condition. Staff at the hospital told her that she could not have an abortion in that juristicion but would have to "travel". With the help of a family planning clinic, she, and her husband, travelled to Liverpool Women's Hospital for a termination. They had to return to Ireland only 12 hours after the termination because they could not afford to stay later. The procedure cost €2,000, as there is no financial assistance from the State or private health insurers for women who terminate pregnancies abroad. The Rotunda did not provide bereavement counselling to parents who terminate the pregnancy for fatal foetal abnormalities, but it will provide such counselling to women who do not terminate. The hospital did not provide any options regarding the foetus's remains, so they left them behind. The ashes were unexpectedly delivered three weeks later by courier.

In February 2012, Mellet and her husband spoke about their case to The Irish Times, which used the pseudonyms "Rachel and Tim". After the case, she was involved with the advocacy group Termination for Medical Reasons.

The Center for Reproductive Rights filed the complaint on Mellet's behalf. This was the first time that an international body found that criminalising abortion in cases of fatal foetal abnormality violated the right to be free from torture, inhuman and degrading treatment or punishment.

=== Abortion law in Ireland ===
Abortion was banned in nearly all cases in Ireland until 2018. There was a constitutional protection for the unborn after the 1983 Eighth Amendment. The 2013 law, the Protection of Life During Pregnancy Act 2013 allowed for abortion in case of danger to the life of the mother. In June 2017 the Citizens Assembly recommended holding a referendum to repeal the 8th Amendment. A referendum was held on May 25, 2018, to repeal the 8th Amendment, which passed with a large majority (66.4%) of the vote.

== Ruling ==
In 2016, the United Nations Human Rights Committee found that Ireland's abortion law violated the United Nations International Covenant on Civil and Political Rights and called for the government to offer her compensation and counselling and for it to change its laws to allow for abortion in cases of fatal foetal abnormality.

The committee found that she had been subjected to discrimination and cruel, inhuman or degrading treatment as a result of Ireland's legal prohibition of abortion. The committee said that in addition to the shame and stigma associated with the criminalization of abortion of a fatally-ill foetus, Mellet's suffering was aggravated by the obstacles that she faced in getting information about the appropriate medical options.

== Reaction ==
=== Amanda Mellet ===
Ms Mellet welcomed the ruling, and called on abortion to be decriminalised.

The Human Rights Committee has made it clear that to redress the violations that I suffered, the Irish Government must ensure that other women do not live through similar violations of their rights. This cannot happen until Article 40.3.3 is repealed, until abortion is decriminalised and legislation is adopted to enable women to access services in Ireland.

— Amanda Mellet

=== Irish Government response ===
The formal response to the finding from the Irish Government (delivered on 1 December 2016) was to explain the Citizens' Assembly process, which would report to the Oireachtas by mid 2017.

=== Abortion rights campaigners ===
The Abortion Rights Campaign welcomed the ruling, and called it a milestone.

The Human Rights Committee has called on Ireland to award Ms Mellet compensation and to revise its laws and Constitution to ensure no other woman or girl is forced to endure a similar ordeal. ... It is vital to note that this decision does not relate only to cases of fatal foetal impairment. This decision has much wider implications as it highlights the direct and indirect harm and discrimination resulting from prohibiting abortion in the state, including through criminalisation

— Linda Kavanagh, Abortion Rights Campaign spokesperson

Terminations for Medical Reasons welcomed the decision of the committee saying "The Committee has determined that Ireland, by refusing access to safe and legal abortion services, is abusing women by treating them in a cruel, inhuman and degrading manner."

The Irish Council for Civil Liberties said the report "cranks up the pressure" on the Government to reform Ireland's "antediluvian" abortion laws.

Amnesty International in Ireland welcomed the ruling, calling it "ground breaking".

=== Anti-abortion campaigners ===
Youth Defence strongly condemned the ruling, calling it "deplorable".

The UN should be protecting these sick babies... instead they are attacking Ireland’s proud pro-life tradition of caring for mothers and babies and trying to bully a sovereign nation into legalising the cruel and barbaric practice of abortion

— Rebecca Roughneen, Youth Defence spokeswoman

The Pro Life Campaign condemned the judgement, and accused the UN of being a "de facto lobby group for abortion", and criticised the offer of compensation.

The UN Human Rights Committee is now one hundred percent partisan in favour of abortion and never takes account of the hugely damaging effects of abortion on both mother and baby. I have the utmost sympathy for the woman at the centre of today's story but I honestly don't believe abortion is ever the answer.

— Cora Sherlock, Pro Life Campaign

The Catholic Archbishop of Armagh, Eamon Martin opposed the finding, saying abortion was a matter for the Irish people, and reaffirmed the Catholic view that abortion should not be allowed in this case.

== Compensation ==
In November 2016, the government paid her €30,000 for the suffering caused by having to travel to another country. Minister for Health Simon Harris (Fine Gael), Labour's Alan Kelly and Fianna Fáil's Billy Kelleher met Mellet and her family to offer the compensation and counselling just one week before the deadline to reply from the UN. This was the first time the Irish government had agreed to compensate someone in such a case. Some legal sources do not think this will set a precedent for the Irish courts, whereas a member of the UN committee said that if another woman took a similar case before the committee, Ireland would have to pay compensation.

== Further cases ==
In 2017, there was a similar case, Whelan v Ireland in which the government paid the woman €30,000 in compensation.

== See also ==
- Abortion in the Republic of Ireland
- D v Ireland
- Miss D
