= Irish abortion referendum =

Irish abortion referendum can refer to any of several referendums regarding Irish legislation:

- in 1983: Eighth Amendment of the Constitution of Ireland
- in 1992: Twelfth Amendment of the Constitution Bill 1992
- in 1992: Thirteenth Amendment of the Constitution of Ireland
- in 1992: Fourteenth Amendment of the Constitution of Ireland
- in 2002: Twenty-fifth Amendment of the Constitution Bill 2002
- in 2018: Thirty-sixth Amendment of the Constitution of Ireland

== See also ==
- Abortion in the Republic of Ireland
