= Joe McCarroll =

Chairman of Pro Life Campaign
- In office March 1992 – December 2015

Vice-Chairman of the Anti-Divorce Campaign
- In office January 1995 – November 1995

National Secretary of Family Solidarity

Personal details
- Occupation: Lecturer, Public Servant
- Known for: Anti-Divorce, Anti-Abortion campaigning

Joe McCarroll is a former conservative campaigner in Ireland. He has campaigned against abortion, same-sex marriage and divorce. McCarroll was a lecturer in ethics in Clonliffe College, Dublin. He also worked as an education officer with responsibility for school attendance, for Dublin Corporation. He was part of the editorial group of The Brandsma Review. McCarroll also had a book, Is the school around the corner just the same, published by Brandsma Books. He also contributed to other publications and newspapers.

== Education ==
McCarroll earned a Master of Arts (MA) in philosophy from University College Dublin in 1982, submitting a thesis that critiqued the work of political philosopher Eric Voegelin. He later earned a Doctor of Philosophy (PhD) in philosophical theology from Queen’s University Belfast in 1988. His doctoral dissertation was titled The development of Bernard Lonergan’s understanding of divine providence from “grace and freedom” to “insight”.

== Anti-Divorce Campaign ==
Joe McCarroll, along with Des Hanafin, is a founding member, and vice-chairman, of the Anti-Divorce Campaign, which successfully campaigned for a No vote in the 1986 Divorce Referendum The Anti-Divorce Campaign unsuccessfully campaigned for a No vote in the 1995 divorce referendum. He warned that if it were to pass, people would be divorced against their will.

Does that mean that if one partner says there is such a prospect [no reasonable prospect of reconciliation], the court is then obliged to deny a divorce? If it doesn't mean that, then you have unilateral divorce against the will of the other person

— Joe McCarroll

The referendum was passed by a slim margin, and after an unsuccessful court challenge by Des Hanafin, was signed into law in June 1996.

== Abortion ==
Joe McCarroll co-founded the Pro Life Campaign in 1992, and was its chairman until December 2015. He was active in the PLC, speaking at seminars.

=== 2002 Abortion referendum ===
While chairman of the Pro Life Campaign, McCarroll called for a 'yes' vote in the Twenty-fifth Amendment of the Constitution Bill 2001, which was rejected by the people in the referendum. He said the proposed amendment was "not anti-woman" and would "put the unborn on the social radar screen" so that women with an unexpected pregnancy could be supported, and that the amendment would provide a very good barrier against "anyone smuggling in abortion and describing it as medical treatment."

== LGBT rights ==
In 1993, as national secretary of Family Solidarity, he campaigned against the decriminalisation of homosexuality, calling it "unnatural". In 2015, in the lead up to the marriage equality referendum, he campaigned against it, and called for a 'No' vote. The referendum was passed.

== Publications ==
- Meeting You in Scripture: Meditations for a New Millennium by Joseph McCarroll, Published by Joseph McCarroll, Dublin, 1999.
- Is the School Around the Corner Just the Same? by Joseph McCarroll, Published by Brandsma Books Ltd, Dublin, 1987.
- Journey to the Centre of the Person, by Joseph McCarroll, Published by Radix Press, New York, 1986.
- Marriage or Divorce - the Real Issue by Joseph McCarroll, Published by Position Papers, Dublin, 1985.

== See also ==
- Pro Life Campaign
- Cora Sherlock
- Abortion in the Republic of Ireland
- LGBT rights in the Republic of Ireland
