= Ordinary referendum =

An ordinary referendum in Ireland is a referendum on a bill other than a bill to amend the Constitution. The Constitution prescribes the process in Articles 27 ("Reference of Bills to the People") and 47 ("The Referendum"). Whereas a constitutional referendum is mandatory for a constitutional amendment bill, an ordinary referendum occurs only if the bill "contains a proposal of such national importance that the will of the people thereon ought to be ascertained". This is decided at the discretion of the President, after a petition by Oireachtas members including a majority of Senators. No such petition has ever been presented, and thus no ordinary referendum has ever been held.

== Overview ==
The Oireachtas is a bicameral legislature in which Dáil Éireann, the lower house, is much more powerful than Seanad Éireann, the upper house. The Seanad cannot veto bills passed by the Dáil; it can at most delay them for 90 days before they are deemed to have been passed. The ordinary referendum in theory allows the Seanad to exercise a check on the Dáil by providing a mechanism for it to prevent the passing of a bill with which it disagrees. However, the composition of the Seanad, especially the fact that 11 of the 60 Senators are nominated by the Taoiseach, means that it usually has a pro-government majority and will not oppose a government bill.

The process leading to an ordinary referendum is in several stages:

- the Dáil passes a bill and sends it to the Seanad
- either
  - the Seanad rejects or amends the bill; or
  - 90 days elapse without the Seanad passing or rejecting the bill
- the Dáil passes a resolution deeming the bill to have been passed unamended by the Seanad
- Oireachtas members petition the President to refer the bill to the people
- the President
  - confers with the Council of State; and
  - decides to refer the bill to the people
- the Government decides to hold a referendum
- the referendum is held

The petition process is outlined in Article 27 of the Constitution and detailed in the Constitution (Verification of Petition) Act, 1944.

The referendum process is broadly similar to that for a constitutional referendum; both are outlined in Article 47 of the Constitution and detailed in the Referendum Act, 1994. The electorate, as for constitutional referendums and Presidential elections, consists of all Irish citizens who are either resident in the state or abroad on diplomatic or Defence Forces assignments. Both ordinary and constitutional referendums will approve a bill if a majority of votes are cast in favour of it. However, an ordinary referendum will not reject a bill unless at least one-third of voters on the electoral register vote against it. The bill will still become law even if a majority of those who vote reject it, provided the overall turnout is low. Hogan et al. call this restriction "altogether unsatisfactory", and consider it another reason why no such referendum has been held.

== Process ==
Once a bill is passed by both houses of the Oireachtas, or passed by the Dáil and deemed to have been passed by the Seanad, it is sent to the President to be signed into law. The President must wait five days before signing, unless the Seanad agrees to an expedited signature. This gives five days for the presentation of a petition under Article 27, to "request the President to decline to sign and promulgate as a law [the Bill,] on the ground that the Bill contains a proposal of such national importance that the will of the people thereon ought to be ascertained". Such a petition must be signed by a majority of the Seanad (i.e. at least 31 Senators) and at least one-third of the Dáil (currently 58 of 174 TDs). Signatures are validated by the chief or assistant clerk of the relevant house, or by a Justice of the District Court, a Commissioner for Oaths, or an officer of the Garda Síochána not below the rank of Superintendent. Forging a signature is punishable as electoral fraud.

In considering the petition, the President must convene a meeting of the Council of State, which gives non-binding advice in the exercise of most of his discretionary powers. He may separately decide to refer the bill to the Supreme Court under Article 26 of the Constitution; in which case, he will not consider the Article 27 petition until after the Court has stated that the bill is not repugnant to the Constitution.

The President has 10 days to decide on the petition, or 6 days if there was an Article 26 decision beforehand. If he rejects the petition, he simply signs the bill as normal; if he accepts it, he informs the Taoiseach, Ceann Comhairle of the Dáil, and Cathaoirleach of the Seanad in writing. The Constitution specifies that one of two things may happen within 18 months of the decision to refer the bill to the people:

- an ordinary referendum approves the bill; or
- a general election is held, followed by a resolution of the Dáil approving the bill. The intervening general election is presumed to have given the same mandate for the bill that an ordinary referendum would have given.

If either happens, the President must then sign the bill. If neither happens, the bill lapses by default. The authority to decide whether to hold a referendum is vested in the Government by the Referendum Act 1994.

== History ==
The 1922 Constitution of the Irish Free State included in Article 47 provision for a referendum similar to the current 1937 Constitution's ordinary referendum. The procedure required, first, a petition by 40% of TDs or 50% of Senators for a 90-day stay on the Governor-General's giving Royal Assent to the bill, and then either a resolution by the Seanad or a petition by 5% of voters demanding a referendum. Approval of a law under Article 47 required half of votes cast at referendum, whereas approval of a Constitutional amendment (under Article 50) required either half of registered voters or two-thirds of votes cast.

The sole attempt to invoke this was in relation to the Electoral (Amendment) (No. 2) Act, 1927, which penalised Oireachtas members who refused to take the Oath of Allegiance. Fianna Fáil TDs, who were abstentionist and refused to take the Oath, attempted to lodge a petition under Article 47; the then government introduced another bill to amend the Constitution such that only TDs and Senators who had taken the Oath would have the power to make such a petition. When Fianna Fáil subsequently entered the Dáil, the next government deleted Article 47 from the Constitution altogether in 1928.

The current 1937 Constitution included a transitional provision for the first President's first three years, during which constitutional amendments could be enacted without referendum. The President could override this and demand a referendum: unlike an ordinary referendum, no Oireachtas petition was required, although a meeting of the Council of State was. In the event, both the First Amendment (1939) and the Second Amendment (1941) were passed with cross-party support and signed by Douglas Hyde without referendum.

The 2013 bill to abolish the Seanad would, if enacted, also have removed the provision for ordinary referendums. This was given as a reason for opposing the bill by Professor Richard Sinnott, the Green Party, and Éamon Ó Cuív.

== Mooted petitions ==
Although no petition to the President has ever been made under Article 27, there are several instances where the possibility of such a petition being made has entered the public debate about proposed bills.

Senator Michael O'Higgins intended to lodge a petition in relation to the Prohibition of Forcible Entry and Occupation Act 1971, in the light of Operation Demetrius in Northern Ireland. When in 1974 O'Higgins demanded the Family Planning Bill be rejected as not having been put to the people, Senator Mary Robinson criticised him for not advocating the Article 27 procedure instead.

David Norris launched a petition regarding the Broadcasting Bill 1990. He stated that it was unlikely to receive enough signatures, but might convince the President to refer the bill to the Supreme Court under Article 26 of the Constitution.

Abortion in the Republic of Ireland is very controversial and has been the subject of multiple constitutional referendums. The 1992 X Case judgment found a limited right to abortion and a corresponding lacuna in statute law. Subsequent governments hesitated to address this for fear of voter backlash. When the 1992 government introduced a constitutional amendment to roll back the X-case judgment, John Bruton suggested instead passing an ordinary statute to regulate the situation and using an Article 27 referendum. The Irish Times in 1995 reported attempts to have an Article 27 petition on the Regulation of Information (Services outside the State for Termination of Pregnancies) Bill, which eased the ban on publication of information about foreign abortion providers. The Bill did have an Article 26 referral, which found it to be Constitutional; but there was insufficient support in the Oireachtas for a petition.

In 1997, the then government considered the possibility of using Article 27 on legislation for the X-case judgment, on the basis that the extra mandate of a popular vote would have forestalled complaints from anti-abortion campaigners if the Oireachtas had legislated in the normal manner. The proposal was criticised as a misuse of the ordinary-referendum provision, which was intended to allow a group opposed to a bill to petition the President, rather than a government supporting a bill to do so. The idea was ultimately dropped because the minimum-turnout condition would have meant that a bill passed by the Oireachtas and rejected by a majority of voters on a low turnout would become law, exacerbating the controversy the idea was intended to forestall. Instead the government proposed both a constitutional amendment and a separate non-amendment bill, the "Protection of Human Life in Pregnancy Bill", but with the latter as a schedule to the former, so that a single referendum could approve both. A court-case questioned the legality of this, arguing that the Protection of Human Life in Pregnancy Bill should instead have been subject to a separate ordinary referendum. The High Court found the procedure to be acceptable. In the event, the amendment was rejected at referendum so the Protection of Human Life in Pregnancy Bill was never introduced.

Brian Hayes said he would start a petition for the bill to trial electronic voting machines in the 2002 general election. Sinn Féin advocated a referendum on the 2009 bill establishing the National Asset Management Agency.

In 2012, the government took some time to decide whether the ratification of the European Fiscal Compact would be passed by ordinary law or as a constitutional amendment. The opposition threatened to invoke Article 27 to force a referendum in the former case, which was one factor in the government's decision to use a constitutional amendment, which was passed at referendum.

In 2013, the media reported that some government and opposition backbenchers were contemplating invoking Article 27 in relation to the Protection of Life During Pregnancy Act 2013, the government's bill to enforce the X-case judgment.

Sinn Féin, during controversy over Irish Water, called on President Michael D. Higgins to refer the Water Services Bill 2014 to the people; the Office of the President responded that without the prescribed Oireachtas petition, he was unable to do so.

In 2026, left-wing opponents of the government's bill to abolish the triple lock on foreign deployment of the Irish Defence Forces announced a press conference on applying the Article 27 procedure to the bill, which was cancelled when they realised too few senators backed the proposal.
