= Abortion and Irish Catholic saints =

Some Christian saints associated with the Irish Catholic Church were linked to performing or inducing abortions or fetal vanishing, primarily throughout the early Middle Ages in Ireland.

== History ==
Saint Patrick is credited with spreading Christianity to the Irish people after his arrival in the 5th century. Before his appearance in Ireland, paganism was widespread across the country and missionaries and saints were tasked with introducing the ideas of God, Christ, and sin to the people. Taking inspiration from Celtic culture, they created an evolved penitential system which listed offences as sins and included the penance that must taken in order to be absolved of the sin.

During this time, abortion was a lesser crime relative to unmarried sexual intercourse and delivering unwanted children. There was much greater flexibility and permittance toward abortion which meant that penances varied on the circumstances that caused a fetus to develop. Stories of these penances and abortions, sometimes described as miraculous, are described in hagiographies recounting the saints' lives and achievements. Saints did not perform all abortions, but when they did, they usually performed them on nuns and often required part of the nuns' penance to be a confession of fornication to not only the saint but sometimes their convent as well. Although not every hagiography is translated, available ones show of several notable abortion saints including Brigid of Kildare, Ciarán of Saigir, Cainnech of Aghaboe, and Áed mac Bricc.

== Known abortion saints ==
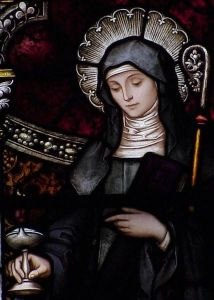
A portrait of St. Brigid from the St. Joseph Parish Church, Macon, Georgia (1903)

=== Brigid of Kildaire ===
Saint Brigid was an Irish nun who lived during the 5th and 6th centuries and became the patroness saint of Ireland as well as a patron to women and children after her death. The earliest mentions of abortion pertaining to Saint Brigid can be found in Cogitosus' hagiography, Vita Sanctae Brigidae, as well as Vita Prima Sanctae Brigitae which is written by an unknown author. Both share the story of Brigid blessing a pregnant woman and causing the evidence of her conception to disappear.

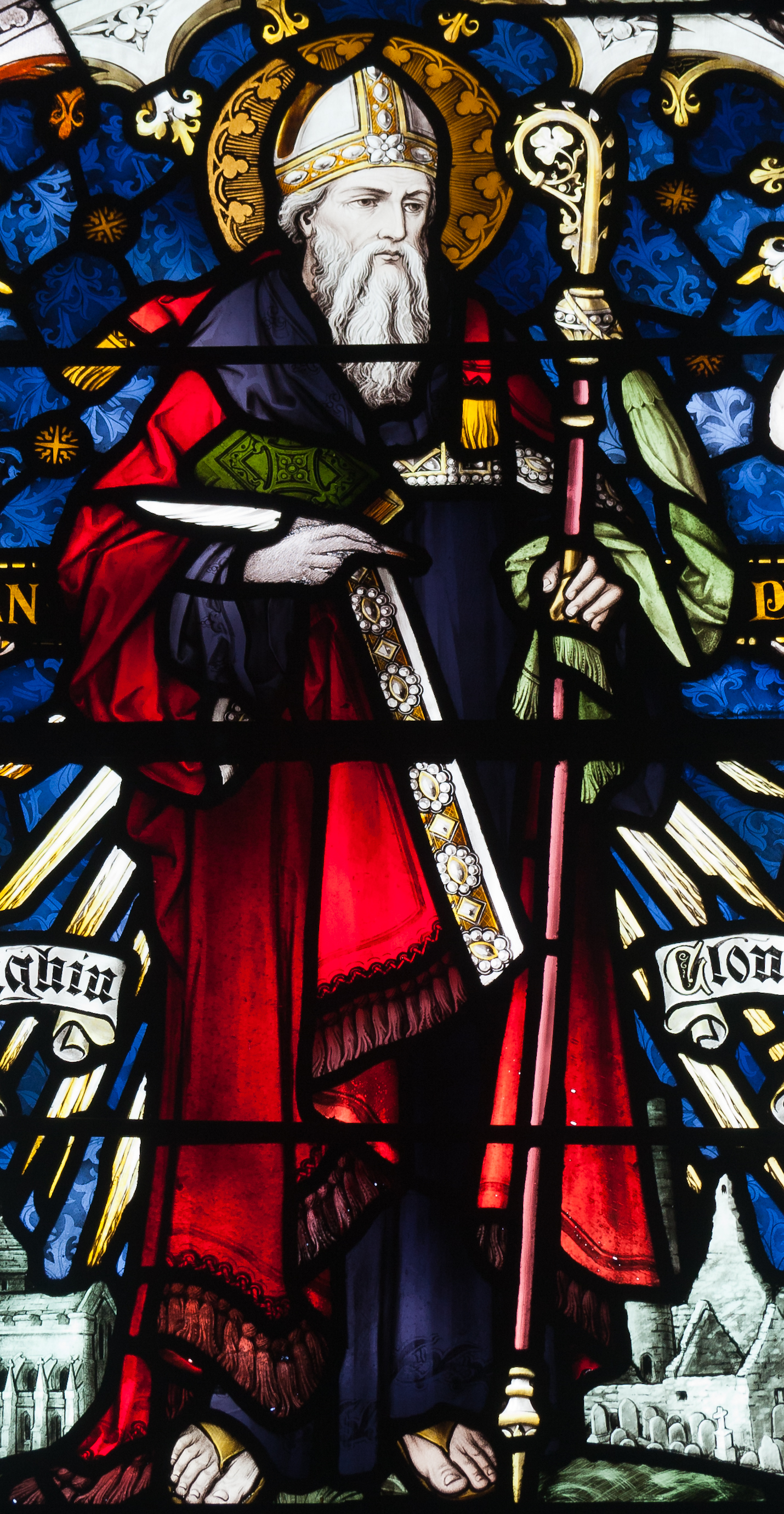
Depiction of St. Ciarán in a stained glass window at St. Brendan's Church in Burr, County Offaly, Ireland

=== Ciarán of Saigir ===
One of Saint Ciarán's miracles is the restoring of virginity to pregnant women which is described in different sections of several hagiography collections but most notably, Codex Kilkenniensis and Codex Salmanticensis. His most recognized abortion miracle pertains Bruinnech, a nun who was abducted and raped by a king, who had her womb blessed by Ciarán causing her pregnant belly to disappear.

=== Cainnech of Aghaboe ===
In the hagiography, vita Cainnechi, a woman is described to have visited Saint Cainnech and asked him to bless her womb which he agreed to before causing the swelling of her stomach and the infant to both disappear.

=== Áed mac Bricc ===
The vita Aidi hagiography, written by an unknown author, tells the story of Saint Áed meeting a group of virgin nuns and removing the infant from the womb of one of the women after he found out she was pregnant.

== Controversy of abortion saints ==
Since the Middle Ages, there has been modifications to saint's hagiographies on these abortion stories. While there are versions of these saints' hagiographies that have these abortion miracles, later versions have modifications where the fetus is not explicitly aborted but rather just disappeared. There are also edited versions where these abortion stories are removed completely from the saint's hagiography. Editors of the saints' vitae, such as John O'Hanlon, excluded these stories because they believed they did not align with Christian doctrine.

Current controversy with abortion saints has to do with disagreement on whether these stories represent abortion and if they are meant to be taken literally.

== Abortion saints and modern Ireland abortion laws ==
Before the 19th century, abortion cases were not handled directly by the state and the Church allowed abortions until quickening, the first movements of pregnancy. However, in 1861, Ireland, as part of the United Kingdom, passed the Offences Against the Person Act which prohibited abortion. After the Republic of Ireland gained independence and the Irish Constitution was created, several amendments were added to give more power to the state over abortion access and restrictions, some of which were unpopular. The Eighth Amendment of the Irish Constitution led to a near-total ban in 1983 though it was finally repealed in 2018.

During this period, some abortion activists used the case of abortion saints and Irish penitentials to oppose referendums and harsher abortion laws in Ireland. In 2002, a referendum was proposed to amend the Irish Constitution that would further restrict abortion and opponents to the proposal used Saint Brigid's abortion stories to reject the church's position on abortion. References to Saint Brigid and abortion were also made during the 2018 St. Brigid's Day celebration as a way to show support for the repealing of the Eighth Amendment.

== See also ==
- Catholic church and abortion
- Abortion in the Republic of Ireland
- List of saints of Ireland

== Bibliography ==
- Audley, Fiona (February 5, 2018). "According to scripture St Brigid performed the first abortion in Ireland". The Irish Post.
- Bitel, Lisa M. (October 1992). ""Conceived in Sins, Born in Delights": Stories of Procreation from Early Ireland". Journal of the History of Sexuality. 3 (2): 193–194. JSTOR 3704054 – via JSTOR.
- Callan, Maeve B. (May 2012). "Of Vanishing Fetuses and Maidens Made-Again: Abortion, Restored Virginity, and Similar Scenarios in Medieval Irish Hagiography and Penitentials". Journal of the History of Sexuality. 21 (2): 283–294. doi:10.1353/sex.2012.0031. PMID 22606751 – via Project MUSE.
- Callan, Maeve (April 19, 2018). "Saints once did abortions – it was a lesser sin than oral sex". The Irish Times. Archived from the original on May 2, 2026.
- Drążkiewicz, Ela; Strong, Thomas; Scheper-Hughes, Nancy; Turpin, Hugh; Saris, A. Jamie; Mishtal, Joanna; Wulff, Helena; French, Brigittine; Garvey, Pauline; Miller, Daniel; Murphy, Fiona; Maguire, Louise; Ní Mhórdha, Máire (August 1, 2020). "Repealing Ireland's Eighth Amendment". Social Anthropology/Anthropologie Sociale. 28 (3): 561, 566–567. doi:10.1111/1469-8676.12914 – via Berghahn Journals.
- Heist, William W. (Spring 1968). "Myth and Folklore in the Lives of Irish Saints". The Centennial Review. 12 (2): 191. JSTOR 23737495 – via JSTOR.
- Hensman, Robert (January 26, 2021). "Christianity and Abortion Rights". Feminist Dissent (5): 159, 165 – via University of Warwick Press.
- Lydon, James (September 3, 1998). The Making of Ireland: From Ancient Times to the Present. Routledge. pp. 2–5. ISBN 978-0415013482.
- Maas, Judith (May 5, 2002). "St Brigid would vote No if faced with this referendum". The Irish Times. Archived from the original on May 2, 2026.
- McNeill, John Thomas (1923). Champion, Édouard (ed.). The Celtic Penitentials and Their Influence on Continental Christianity. Mâcon, France: Protat Brothers, Printers. pp. 1, 107–108.
- Mistry, Zubin (November 2013). "The Sexual Shame of the Chaste: 'Abortion Miracles' in Early Medieval Saints' Lives". Gender & History. 25 (3): 609–613. doi:10.1111/1468-0424.12040 – via Wiley Online Library.
- Monaghan, Gabrielle (June 3, 2012). "Medieval saints 'were abortionists'". The Times.
