= Termination for Medical Reasons (advocacy group) =

Irish organization

- Formation: April 2012; 13 years ago
- Type: Support group; Abortion rights lobby group
- Website: Termination for Medical Reasons on Facebook

Termination for Medical Reasons (TFMR) is a campaign and support group seeking to change the law in Ireland to allow terminations in cases of fatal foetal abnormalities. Amanda Mellet (of Mellet v Ireland) is a founding member. They campaign for better services for people who experience fatal foetal abnormalities. In 2016 they welcomed the Irish government's new guidelines on bereavement counselling for grieving parents.

== Initial meeting with politicians ==
In April 2012, TFMR met with a group of 25 TDs and Senators who were investigating how to reply the European Court of Human Rights judgement in A, B and C v Ireland, and to ask for a change in Ireland's abortion law. Senator Rónán Mullen, who was in attendance, was not sympathetic to their cause, asking what their real agenda was. He later denied being nasty to the women.

== Protection of Life During Pregnancy Act 2013 ==
During the debate on the Protection of Life During Pregnancy Act 2013, the group called for an exception to allow termination in cases of fatal foetal abnormalities, however Taoiseach Enda Kenny claimed it would be unconstitutional to include that.

== Citizens' Assembly ==
In 2016 the Irish government set up a Citizens' Assembly to discuss Ireland's abortion laws. TFMR made a submission calling for a repeal of the Eighth Amendment and the removal of abortion from criminal law.

They were not invited to present to the Citizens' Assembly. Every Life Counts, a similar support/campaign group for parents of children diagnosed with fatal foetal abnormalities, but who are opposed to change in Ireland's abortion law, were invited.

== See also ==
- Abortion in the Republic of Ireland
- D v Ireland
- Miss D
