= Pro Life Campaign =

Anti-abortion advocacy organisation

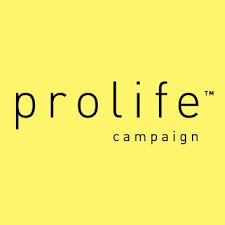
- Formation: March 1992; 34 years ago
- Type: Social conservatism; Anti-abortion
- Headquarters: 40, Mount Street Upper, Dublin 2,
- Spokesperson: Eilís Mulroy
- Legal Advisor: William Binchy
- Website: ProLifeCampaign.ie

Pro Life Campaign (PLC) is an Irish anti-abortion advocacy organisation. Its primary spokesperson is Eilís Mulroy. It is a non-denominational organisation which promotes anti-abortion views, and opposes abortion in all circumstances, including cases of rape and incest.

The Pro Life Campaign was established in 1992. Prominent members also opposed LGBT rights and campaigned against the decriminalisation of homosexuality in Ireland.

== Foundation ==
After the Eighth Amendment of the Constitution of Ireland was ratified in September 1983, a number of those involved in that campaign, including some lawyers, decided to initiate legal proceedings through SPUC (Society for the Protection of Unborn Children; Ireland). The targets were two pregnancy advisory agencies in Dublin. The cases started in 1985, won at the Supreme Court of Ireland (1988) and the Court of Justice of the European Union (1992). That same year, the X Case arose, and abortion in potentially wide circumstances was endorsed by the Irish Supreme Court.

The group that had planned the SPUC (Ireland) cases at once advised the setting up of the Pro Life Campaign (PLC). Within a week of the court judgement, it had set up an office in North Great George's Street and held its first press conference on 10 March. The chairman, and later honorary president, was Des Hanafin, who had played a central role in the 1983 campaign.

Pro Life Campaign is a trading name of VIE Ltd, a private limited company incorporated in Ireland in June 1993. Its founding directors were Joe McCarroll, Owen Doyle, Mary Barrett, John O'Reilly, Barry Kiely, Des Hanafin, Marie Vernon, Catherine Bannon, Jerry Collins, Michael Lucey and Desmond McDoland.

It has offices at 40 Mount Street Upper, Dublin 2.

== 1992 Abortion Referendums ==
In 1992, in the wake of the X Case, there were three abortion referendums in Ireland (12th, 13th and 14th).

The government had proposed the 12th Amendment Bill as an attempt to rule out the risk of suicide as a ground for an abortion. It would have added the following clause to Article 40.3.3º:

It shall be unlawful to terminate the life of an unborn unless such termination is necessary to save the life, as distinct from the health, of the mother where there is an illness or disorder of the mother giving rise to a real and substantial risk to her life, not being a risk of self-destruction.

The Pro Life Campaign rejected this wording as too broad, and proposed the following alternative wording:

It shall be unlawful to act in such a way as to bring about the termination of the life of an unborn unless such termination arises indirectly as a side-effect of treatment designed to protect the life of the mother.

The PLC also called for a No vote on the 14th Amendment which allowed for the provision of information on services outside the state. It was strongly opposed to the 13th, which allowed for travel outside the state, but did not call for a No vote.

Both the 13th and 14th amendments were passed. The 12th amendment bill was defeated, after a combination of liberal campaigners who did not support excluding a risk of suicide as a ground, and those in the PLC.

== 2002 Abortion Referendum ==
The Pro Life Campaign campaigned for a Yes vote on the Twenty-fifth Amendment of the Constitution Bill 2002. A statement on their website read:

We welcome the proposed 25th Amendment (Protection of Human Life in Pregnancy) Bill and are calling for a 'YES' vote.
The Amendment restores protection to unborn children. It protects women by ensuring the lawful availability of necessary medical treatment to save their lives.

The reality of unexpected pregnancies also challenges us to put the resources in place to meet the real needs of women. A clear law on the right to life is an important first step to framing social policies to help reduce our abortion rate.

During the campaign, a member referenced the Finnish study published in the British Medical Journal which claimed women were six times more likely to commit suicide after abortion than if they went through with their pregnancies.

The Pro Life Campaign was the second largest spender during the referendum, spending €350,000. It received €200,000 of undisclosed donations during the campaign.

== NGO status at UNESC ==
The Pro-Life Campaign has consultative NGO status at the United Nations Economic and Social Council, granted in 2011.

It has participated in regular sessions organised by the Council to oversee the various covenants affecting Ireland, and attended and made written submissions to Universal Periodic Reviews into Ireland.

In June 2015, the PLC participated in a General Discussion on Article 6 (Right to Life) of the International Covenant on Civil and Political Rights.

In February 2017, the PLC participated in the 66th Session of the Convention on the Elimination of all forms of Discrimination Against Women (CEDAW), where it advocated against any change to Ireland's abortion law.

== Protection of Life During Pregnancy Act 2013 ==
The PLC organised a protest in Merrion Square in June 2013, as the Protection of Life During Pregnancy Act 2013 was being debated. Official figures put the crowd at 15,000 to 20,000 people, with the organisers claiming 50,000. Attendees included GAA Tyrone football manager Mickey Harte, Adele Best of Women Hurt, Jennifer Kehoe, Maria Steen and Íde Nic Mathúna, co-founder of Youth Defence. The Bill was approved in the Dáil by 127 votes to 31. It passed its final stage in the Seanad on 23 July 2013, by 39 votes to 14. It was signed into law on 30 July by Michael D. Higgins, the President of Ireland.

A 2014 "National Vigil" took place at Merrion Square on 3 May 2014, and was attended by about 4,500 people, with the organisers claiming 15,000. They criticised the newly passed Protection of Life During Pregnancy Act. Speakers included Cora Sherlock, Caroline Simons, and Lynn Coles of Women Hurt.

== Involvement in elections ==
The Pro Life Campaign has been involved in European, local, and general elections by producing a 'voter guide', which ranks all candidates based on their position on abortion. In the 2016 general election, their guided focused on the position (and voting record) of candidates based on their stance on the Protection of Life During Pregnancy Act 2013. In the 2020 general election, it centred on the candidates' positions on the 2018 abortion referendum and their voting record on the Health (Regulation of Termination of Pregnancy) Act 2018 (if applicable).

Ahead of the 2024 general election, Pro Life Campaign spokesperson Eilís Mulroy explained the purpose of their voter guide was to "direct pro-life voters towards the best candidates and help ensure that in the next Dáil pro-life voices are represented". She also urged voters to "tactically vote against candidates we least want to see elected".

The Pro Life Campaign has also spent money on advertising during elections, such as €40,000 during the 2016 Irish general election and €37,345 in the 2020 general election.

== Citizens Assembly ==
In 2016 the Irish government established the Citizens' Assembly, a group of 99 citizens, to discuss the Eighth Amendment, and then make recommendation to the government. This is similar to the 2012 Constitutional Convention.

While the PLC criticised the Citizens' Assembly, claiming it has a pre-arranged outcome, it nonetheless participated, making a presentation to the Assembly in March 2017.

== 2018 referendum and Love Both campaign ==
In June 2017, Leo Varadkar, who became Taoiseach following his victory in the May Fine Gael leadership election, signaled his intention to hold a referendum in 2018 on whether to replace Article 40.3.3.º of the Constitution, which provided "an equal right to life to the mother and the unborn." The Pro Life Campaign responded by expressing its disappointment that Varadkar had announced the decision prematurely before the special Oireachtas Committee on the Eighth Amendment had submitted its findings.

The Pro Life Campaign was critical of the Oireachtas Committee on the Eighth Amendment's recommendations published in January, which they claimed were "exclusively focused on taking away all meaningful protection from unborn babies." They further criticised the committee for failing to hear the perspectives of "families who say their children are alive today because of the Eighth Amendment." Solicitor and PLC spokesperson Cora Sherlock echoed this argument later in January in response to an Irish Times opinion poll which found 56% of people supported changing the constitution while only 29% supported retaining the Eighth Amendment. She expressed confidence that the polls would reverse due to growing discussion "about families who have been saved by the Eighth Amendment."

On 31 January, the Government formally decided to progress with holding a referendum in early summer. The date was later fixed for 24 May 2018. Reacting on 1 February to the decision, PLC spokesperson Dr Ruth Cullen stated that "what was being proposed was the removal of the legal protection from unborn babies and the provision of abortion on demand" and urged voters to reject the referendum's proposals.

In the referendum on the Thirty-sixth Amendment of the Constitution Bill 2018 to replace the provisions of Article 40.3.3º with a clause allowing for legislation on the termination of pregnancy, which passed by a two-thirds majority, the Pro Life Campaign organised the unsuccessful Love Both campaign. Love Both described itself as a "nationwide movement" and had key spokespeople involved. Love Both was distinguished from other No campaigns as it promoted a "pro-woman anti-abortion discourse." The campaign was distinguished by its emphasis on "talk[ing] passionately about human rights", and its presentation of young women, students, and "professionals in suits" as its public activist base, according to The Guardian newspaper.

From February, the PLC launched the "Love Both Roadshow", which was described as an "information campaign". It saw anti-abortion campaigners travel to various urban centres across Ireland until the end stages of the referendum campaign. The campaigners claimed that since 1983 approximately 100,000 people have been born who would not have been were it not for the Eighth Amendment. Many such events were held in towns during the referendum campaign and became a staple of the PLC's public activism.

In March, PLC spokesperson Cora Sherlock condemned remarks from Fine Gael politician Regina Doherty that the repeal campaign would "not accept a No vote in the upcoming referendum" as being "arrogant and deeply undemocratic". On 31 March spokespeople from the Love Both Roadshow in Mullingar questioned whether "we can trust politicians to lead us on this" and complained that the No campaign were "not really getting a fair hearing" in the media.

The Love Both and wider No campaign generated significant support within the Fianna Fáil parliamentary party, with thirty-one TDs and Senators from the party appearing for a photo-call on 1 May at Merrion Square holding Love Both placards and urging the electorate to "vote No" and to "support women, protect babies, save lives." This contrasted with the pro-repeal position adopted by Fianna Fáil leader Micheál Martin, who told the Dáil in January that whilst he was "instinctively on the pro-life side of the abortion debate", he was influenced to support a Yes vote owing to expert opinion and by the deliberations of both the Citizens' Assembly and the Oireachtas Committee.

Love Both launched its "official" referendum campaign at the Alex Hotel, Dublin on 18 April 2018. The event was attended by six TDs: Peter Fitzpatrick, Éamon Ó Cuív, Kevin O'Keefe, Declan Breathnach, Mattie McGrath and Michael Healy-Rae. The campaign concentrated its messaging on characterising the proposal as "extreme", amounting to "abortion on demand" and being similar to the British abortion law.

In May, a further six regional Love Both rallies took place across the country, with a final rally in Merrion Square, Dublin attracting thousands of participants. The final rally heard speeches from Caroline Simons, legal advisor to Love Both, and from Dr Andrew O'Regan of the "Medical Alliance for the 8th" campaign. At an event hosted by Love Both's Roadshow in Monaghan on 10 May, former UCD Students' Union President and Love Both spokesperson, Katie Ascough, told her audience that a Yes vote would remove the obligation for the Government to go directly to the people through a referendum on issues related to abortion and "they would be free to make whatever laws they want."

On 22 May controversy was generated when the PLC spokesperson Cora Sherlock "pulled out" of an RTÉ Prime Time debate scheduled for that evening, due to the refusal of RTÉ to swap out Sherlock for Maria Steen, following the latter's appearance on a Claire Byrne Live debate the previous week where she "had impressed" in her performance. The controversy about the selection of No campaign debaters was described as a "Mexican stand-off" at Montrose following Sherlock's withdrawal. Eventually, the Sinn Féin TD Peadar Tóibín participated in a head-to-head debate with Minister for Health, Simon Harris, which aired on the evening of 22 May. The following day, RTÉ's handling of the debate was criticised by the Love Both campaign and the state broadcaster was accused of "failing to achieve balance on the panel" due to their decision to invite the pro-repeal Prof Mary Higgins onto a panel debate but failed to invite a medic from the No side. The campaign described this as "utterly unacceptable". RTÉ defended its handling of the debate as being "fair and equitable".

In the last stages of the referendum, the PLC and Love Both concentrated on urging voters to reject the referendum on the basis that the proposed abortion legislation was "extremist". Katie Ascough claimed on 17 May that the prospective abortion law would be "more extreme than the law in Britain".

On 23 May, the day before the poll, Cora Sherlock described the referendum as giving the Government "a blank cheque to write whatever abortion law it wants, no matter how extreme." Following the vote on 24 May and the release of an exit poll which predicted a "landslide victory for the Yes side", Love Both expressed the view that the result represented "a very sad day for Ireland" and called on Taoiseach Leo Varadkar to include restrictions within any future abortion legislation.

In the aftermath of their referendum defeat, Love Both spokesperson in Cork, Maeve O'Hanlon, said the group would campaign "to keep the number of abortions low". PLC spokesperson Ruth Cullen pledged to hold Varadkar "to his promise that repeal would only lead to abortion in very restrictive circumstances." Following the referendum defeat, the Love Both campaign largely folded back into the Pro Life Campaign.

=== Love Both's social media strategy ===
Love Both adopted a social media strategy which produced videos that foregrounded "young women representing different Irish counties" to counteract an impression that anti-abortion voices were "restricted to older people". Social media advertising policies became a contentious aspect of the campaign, with Facebook taking steps to prevent efforts to "disrupt the referendum with disinformation." On 6 April, a Love Both spokesperson said they were "wary of Facebook introducing 'censorship' during the referendum". In May, Google announced a ban on all ads relating to the referendum and Facebook banned all foreign advertising on the issue. The Guardian noted that "the most obvious difference between the two sides of the campaign" was that No campaign ads used "emotional language" compared with the more "legalistic tone" of the Yes campaign ads.

== March for Life ==
The Pro Life Campaign organises an annual 'March for Life', which typically attracts thousands of participants. The event is typically held in Dublin, but has also been held in Donegal, Cork, and Galway.

== Controversies ==
Joe McCarroll co-founded and was chairperson of the Pro Life campaign until December 2015. In 1993, as national secretary of Family Solidarity, he campaigned against the decriminalisation of homosexuality, calling it "unnatural". In 2015, in the lead up to the marriage equality referendum, he campaigned against it, and called for a no vote. Writing in The Brandsma Review, after the referendum that approved same-sex marriage, he accused the media of lying and complained about funding from outside the state.

Des Hanafin, co-founder, former leader and former honorary president, accused equality campaigners in the same-sex marriage referendum of spreading a "palpable climate of fear", and called for a No vote. His son, Senator John Hanafin resigned from Fianna Fáil rather than vote for civil partnerships for same sex couples in 2010.

In 2005, Pro Life Campaign members wrote to a Dáil committee arguing against legal recognition of same-sex couples. The submission from the North Tipperary branch opposed any legal recognition of same sex couples, claiming same sex relationships were an "unnatural union" and "totally unacceptable, and an attack upon the family". The Cork North West branch submission asked "why can't they [same-sex couples] make their own legal arrangements distinct from marriage?" and stated that "a homosexual environment is incomplete [for raising children]".

== See also ==
- Abortion in the Republic of Ireland
- Iona Institute
- Youth Defence
- Family Solidarity
- Des Hanafin
- Joe McCarroll
