= The Brandsma Review =

Defunct catholic magazine

- Type: Bimonthly magazine
- Owner(s): Brandsma Books
- Editor: Peadar Laighleis
- Founded: 1992
- Circulation: 3,000
- Price: Subscription per issue: €3.50
- Website: http://brandsmareview.wordpress.com/

The Brandsma Review was a bi-monthly magazine of conservative Catholic opinion in circulation in Ireland. Its Ecclesiastical Latin masthead is Pro Vita, Pro Ecclesia Dei et Pro Hibernia 'for life, for the Church of God and for Ireland'. It is called after the Dutch Carmelite priest-journalist Blessed Titus Brandsma, who lived in Ireland for a period in the 1930s and was subsequently martyred by the Nazis.

== Overview ==
The magazine was founded in the wake of the X Case and the resignation of Rt. Rev. Éamon Casey as Bishop of the Roman Catholic Diocese of Galway, Kilmacduagh and Kilfenora in 1992 and since then it has consistently opposed euthanasia, embryo experimentation, and abortion.

The legend 'Ecclesia Dei' is a reference to the 1988 document of Pope John Paul II, Ecclesia Dei Adflicta which deals with the Tridentine Mass, but this is not a unanimous position within the editorial board. Board members of the Latin Mass Society of Ireland have contributed articles over the years. At the same time, the Review tries to cultivate a broad presentation of Catholic culture and has correspondents in North America, Europe and the Australasia. It sometimes publishes articles by non-Catholics (generally Evangelical Protestants and eastern Orthodox, but sometimes Jews, Muslims and conservative secularists have contributed) on matters of common concern.

The Brandsma Review has published many articles criticising the state of catechesis in Irish Catholic schools and the existence of unorthodox liturgical practices and doctrinal statements within sections of Irish Catholicism. It has also been critical of the tendency of some Traditionalist Catholics to believe in conspiracy theories. The March–April 2008 issue (vol. 17 no.2) p. 2 has an editorial "Beware of French Letter Liberals – And Jew Baiters!" which describes "our sniff test for articles submitted for publication. The left nostril is for pro-contraceptionists... the right nostril, for Jew baiters. Both are incompatible with real Catholicism, and so both are a no-no." It has also published articles questioning the alleged Marian apparitions at Medugorje.

The founder editor of The Brandsma Review is Nick Lowry, a retired news editor from Radio Telefís Éireann who contributes signed editorials and a regular column "Straws for the Camel's Back" commenting on current events within Irish Catholicism. Lowry retired in February 2012 and was replaced by Peadar Laighleis, who was also President of the Latin Mass Society of Ireland. The original model used was that of the Ballintrillick Review, which was in circulation in Ireland in the 1980s, until its editor Doris Manley died of cancer; the Ballintrillick Review was outspokenly anti-abortion but was somewhat more communitarian on economic matters and had no particular interest in the Tridentine Mass. Many of the original Brandsma Review subscribers had subscribed to the more strident Faith and Family which earned notoriety at the time by being banned from the Catholic book store Veritas.

== Contributors ==
Among the contributors to the magazine are Mel Cormican, David Manly, and the campaigner on many social issues Dr Joe McCarroll.
