= Irish abortion referendum 1992 =

Irish abortion referendum 1992 can refer to any of three abortion amendments put to referendum that year:

- Twelfth Amendment of the Constitution Bill 1992
- Thirteenth Amendment of the Constitution of Ireland
- Fourteenth Amendment of the Constitution of Ireland
