= Every Life Counts =

Parent support network in Ireland

- Type: Support group
- Location: Dominick Court, 41 Dominick Street Lower, Dublin 1, Ireland
- Website: EveryLifeCounts.ie

Every Life Counts is a support network for families whose child is diagnosed with a life limiting condition in Ireland. They campaign for the creation of a perinatal hospice in Ireland, as an opposition to abortion in cases of life limiting conditions, claiming it is not a "pathway to healing", and that abortion causes depression and distress.

They are opposed to the term "fatal foetal abnormalities" or "incompatible with life" calling it an "ugly term", preferring the term "life limiting condition". They point out that some people diagnosed with life limiting conditions (e.g. Patau syndrome a.k.a. Trisomy 13), live for many years after birth.

After the 2016 Mellet v Ireland UN case, they claimed the United Nations Human Rights Committee "deliberately ignored the experiences of families who had received great joy and love from carrying their babies to term".

They made a submission to the Citizens' Assembly, which discussed Ireland's abortion laws, where they claimed that abortion is not a solution to a fatal foetal abnormalities diagnosis. They were selected as one of the groups to make a presentation to the members of the Citizens' Assembly.

== See also ==
- ]
- Termination for Medical Reasons (advocacy group), a pro-choice equivalent organisation
