= Together for Yes =

- Formation: 22 March 2018
- Type: Pro-choice lobby group
- Website: www.togetherforyes.ie

Together for Yes (TFY) is an abortion rights campaign group in Ireland. It campaigned successfully for a Yes vote in the 2018 referendum to ratify the Thirty-sixth Amendment, which removed the Eighth Amendment's constitutional ban on abortion in Ireland.

== Membership ==
The group is an umbrella organisation, bringing together over 70 diverse civil society bodies. The core member groups with representatives on the board are:

- The National Women's Council of Ireland
- The Coalition to Repeal the 8th Amendment
- The Abortion Rights Campaign
- The Irish Family Planning Association

Additional groups include:

- Atheist Ireland
- Green Party
- Fine Gael (Note: Fine Gael co-ordinated a campaign for Yes-supporting party members, which was formally launched on 21 April 2018 by Leo Varadkar and Simon Harris. The campaign supported Together for Yes rather than putting up posters of its own.)
- Disability rights group, Inclusion Ireland
- Irish Council for Civil Liberties
- Labour Party
- Parents Together for Yes, also known as Parents for Choice in Pregnancy and Childbirth
- National LGBT Federation
- Workers' Party
- Sinn Féin
- SIPTU
- Social Democrats
- Union of Students in Ireland (USI)
- University College Dublin Students' Union

== Fund-raising ==
When the project was launched, a crowd-funding campaign was started, with a target of €50,000. This was met within hours, and reached €500,000 within four days. As of 26 April, Together for Yes had raised over €800,000.
