= Gerard Hogan =

Irish judge, lawyer and academic

The Hon. Mr. Justice Gerard Hogan MRIA
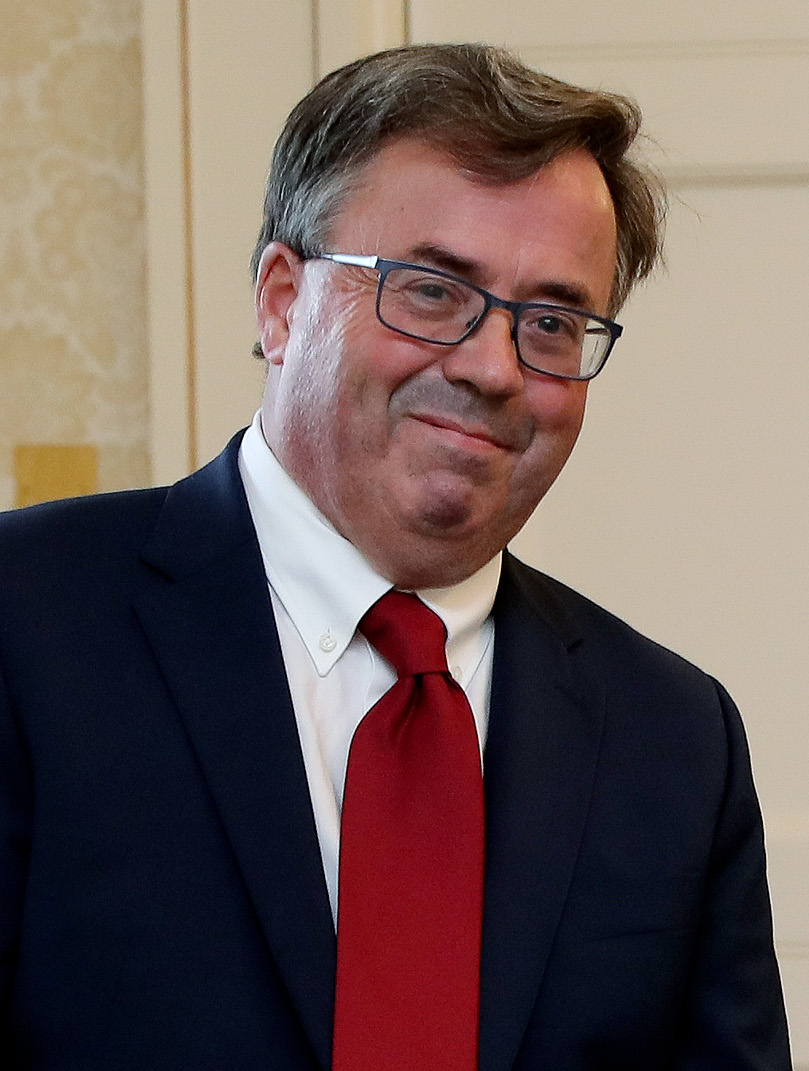
- Hogan in 2021

Judge of the Supreme Court of Ireland
- Incumbent
- Assumed office 15 October 2021
- Nominated by: Government of Ireland
- Appointed by: Michael D. Higgins

Advocate General of the European Court of Justice
- In office 8 October 2018 – 7 October 2021
- Nominated by: Government of Ireland
- Appointed by: European Council
- President: Koen Lenaerts
- Preceded by: Melchior Wathelet
- Succeeded by: Anthony Collins

Judge of the Court of Appeal
- In office 24 October 2014 – 7 October 2018
- Nominated by: Government of Ireland
- Appointed by: Michael D. Higgins

Judge of the High Court
- In office 11 November 2010 – 24 October 2014
- Nominated by: Government of Ireland
- Appointed by: Mary McAleese

Personal details
- Born: 13 August 1958 (age 67) Carrick-on-Suir, County Tipperary, Ireland
- Spouse: Karen Quirk (m. 1995)
- Education: University College Dublin; University of Pennsylvania; Trinity College Dublin; King's Inns

Gerard William Augustine Hogan (born 1958) is an Irish judge, lawyer and academic who has served as a Judge of the Supreme Court of Ireland since October 2021. He previously served as Advocate General of the European Court of Justice from 2018 to 2021, a Judge of the Court of Appeal from 2014 to 2018 and a Judge of the High Court from 2010 to 2014. Hogan first worked as a barrister and lecturer in law specialising in constitutional and administrative law.

== Early life and education ==
Hogan is from Carrick-on-Suir, County Tipperary. He was born in 1958, to Mai and Liam Hogan. His father was the deputy principal of Christian Brothers secondary school in the town. He was educated at University College Dublin, from where he received BCL and LLM degrees in 1979 and 1981. He co-authored his first book Prisoners' Rights: A Study in Irish Prison Law in 1981 with Paul McDermott and Raymond Byrne. He obtained a John F. Kennedy memorial scholarship to study for an LLM, which he earned in 1982 from the University of Pennsylvania Law School. He subsequently attended the King's Inns. He holds two doctorates – he holds an LLD from UCD and received a PhD in law from Trinity College Dublin in 2001.

Early in his legal career in 1986, he supported the Anti-Apartheid Movement with other legal scholars, including Mary McAleese, Mary Robinson and Bryan MacMahon. He was involved with the Progressive Democrats and in 1988 wrote the party's proposed new Constitution of Ireland with Michael McDowell.

In May 2021, he was made a member of the Royal Irish Academy.

== Legal career ==
He was called to the Bar in July 1984 and became a Senior Counsel in 1997. He appeared domestically in cases in the High Court and the Supreme Court and internationally at the European Court of Human Rights and the European Court of Justice.

Hogan is noted in particular for his experience in constitutional law. He acted for the Attorney General of Ireland in references made by President Mary Robinson under Article 26 of the Constitution of Ireland to the Supreme Court regarding the Information (Termination of Pregnancies) Bill 1995 and the Employment Equality Bill of 1997. He appeared again for the Attorney General (with Dermot Gleeson and Paul Gallagher) in another reference made by President Mary McAleese regarding the Health (Amendment) (No. 2) Bill 2004.

He was a law lecturer and fellow at Trinity College Dublin from 1982 to 2007. He lectured on constitutional law, competition law and the law of tort. He is regarded as "one of the foremost constitutional and administrative lawyers in Ireland". He is the co-author of Administrative Law in Ireland and JM Kelly: The Irish Constitution, the core Irish legal texts in Irish administrative and constitutional law respectively. He has also written a text on political violence and a book where he chronicled the origins of the Constitution of Ireland.

During his career as a barrister he was involved in cases involving employment law, habeas corpus, immigration law, judicial review, company law, and commercial law.

He appeared for Katherine Zappone and Ann Louise Gilligan in Zappone v. Revenue Commissioners in the High Court and Miss D in her case related to the rights to travel abroad for an abortion. He represented the State in the High Court and the Supreme Court in litigation that emerged following a court finding that an offence of unlawful carnal knowledge was unconstitutional. In 2008, he acted for Colm Murphy and Seamus Daly in the Supreme Court who were contesting an action taken by families of victims of the Omagh bombing when they were refused access to books of evidence.

Hogan was involved in several tribunals and Oireachtas committee investigations, appearing either in the actual proceedings or in related court proceedings. He represented Desmond O'Malley at the Beef Tribunal in 1992, Dermot Desmond at the Moriarty Tribunal in 2004, and Jim Higgins and Brendan Howlin in actions related to the Morris Tribunal. He acted for the Committee on Members’ Interests of Seanad Éireann in action taken by Ivor Callely.

He was the first barrister to appear in an Irish court without a wig, following the enactment of the Courts and Court Officers Act 1995.

Throughout his career, he has been a member of committees and boards in areas requiring legal expertise. He chaired the Department of Justice and Equality's Balance in Criminal Law Review Group, and was a member of three other review groups: the Constitution Review Group, the Competition and Mergers Review Group and the Offences Against the State Acts Review Group. He was also a member of the Competition Authority's Advisory Panel and the Committee on Court Practice and Procedure.

== Judicial career ==
=== High Court ===
He was appointed a Judge of the High Court in 2010. Soon after his appointment, he held an emergency hearing in his home regarding a blood transfusion for a sick baby. He was one of three judges who heard a case taken by Marie Fleming, seeking a right to die in 2012. His reference to the European Court of Justice in 2014 regarding the International Safe Harbor Privacy Principles, resulted in a declaration by the Grand Chamber that the Safe Harbour Decision was invalid.

=== Court of Appeal ===
He subsequently became a Judge of the Court of Appeal upon its establishment in October 2014.

=== Advocate General of the European Court of Justice ===
In May 2018, he was nominated by the Government of Ireland for appointment as the Advocate General to the European Court of Justice. His term began in October 2018 and would have expired in October 2024. Anthony Collins was appointed in 2021 to complete his term following his appointment to the Supreme Court. Hogan concluded his term on 7 October 2021.

In one of his first opinions, on a reference from the French Conseil d'État, he found that Regulation (EU) No 1169/2011 of the European Parliament and of the Council of 25 October 2011 requires that products originating from Israeli-occupied territories should indicate if these products come from such a territory. His opinion was followed by the Court of Justice.

=== Supreme Court ===
In April 2021, the Irish government nominated him to the Supreme Court of Ireland. He was appointed in October 2021.

== Personal life ==
Hogan is married to Karen Quirk.
