= Murder of John Horgan =

1973 child murder in Ireland

John Horgan was a seven-year-old Irish boy who was murdered by his 16 year old neighbour, Lorcan Bale, in Palmerstown, Dublin on 14 June 1973.

== Background ==
John Horgan was the only child of Anne and Terry Horgan. Terry Horgan was a member of Opus Dei and a founding member of Family Solidarity.

== Murder ==
On 14 June 1973 Anne Horgan left her son John in the care of her teenage neighbour, Lorcan Bale, as she visited a friend in hospital.

Bale took Horgan into fields behind their homes to look for rabbits. As Horgan bent downwards to look into the rabbit hole, Bale fatally struck Horgan on the head with a club. Bale then placed Horgan's body into a sack and brought him to his home.

In the attic of the Bale home, Bale tied Horgan to the rafters of the attic nude and posed in a cruciform shape. The attic was accessed through a false panel cut into the wardrobe in Bales’ room.

An alter had been created beneath the body which contained a silver chalice and communion hosts which had been stolen from a local Catholic church.

== Investigation ==
Horgan's family became concerned at 4pm when Horgan hadn't returned for tea. The neighbourhood conducted a search and Gardaí were contacted at 9pm when no trace of Horgan was found.

Tracker dogs aided in the search and two ponds were trawled. Lorcan Bale also aided in the search.

Lorcan Bale was informally questioned by Gardaí and led them to the body.

== Lorcan Bale ==
Lorcan Bale is the eldest of children and was educated at Coláiste Mhuire in Dublin City Centre. His father, Kenneth Bale, was a member of the Legion of Mary. Bale was an altar boy, though a friend described him as having an interest in the occult.

In November 1973, Bale plead guilty to murder and received a mandatory life sentence.

Bale was released after serving seven years in jail.

Bale now resides in Germany. He is married and has an office job. He is also now a church deacon.

== Inquest ==
While researching Irish murders, television producer and author David Malone learned of the Horgan murder and also discovered that no death certificated had been issued for John Horgan. Upon reporting this to the Dublin County Coroner, it was announced that a new inquest would be held.

Over 37 years after the murder, an inquest was held in 2011.

== Media ==
The murder of John Horgan is described as 'forgotten' and 'swept under the carpet' in contemporary media reports and articles note how little coverage it received in Ireland at the time.

Author David Malone wrote the true crime book The Boy in the Attic about the case.

The case was featured on an episode of the true crime podcast Mens Rea.
