= Family Solidarity =

Family Solidarity is an Irish conservative advocacy group run by lay Catholics. Founded in 1984 by supporters of the campaign that led to the Eighth Amendment of the Constitution of Ireland, it campaigned against the introduction of divorce. Nora Bennis was a member.

They condemned the Services outside the State for Termination of Pregnancies 1995 act which allowed the publication of information on abortion available outside Ireland.

Sports commentator Michael O'Hehir was a patron of the organisation at its founding. Justin Barrett was also involved.

Joe McCarroll was national secretary in 1992 of Family Solidarity, and later chairperson of the Pro Life Campaign.

In 2005 Family Solidarity members had written to a Dáil committee arguing against legal recognition of same-sex couples.

== See also ==
- Pro Life Campaign
