= Balance in Criminal Law Review Group =

Irish legal review committee

The Balance in Criminal Law Review Group was an Irish legal review committee established by Michael McDowell, Minister for Justice, Equality and Law Reform, in 2006. It made numerous recommendations which have been implemented in Irish criminal law.

== Recommendations ==
The committee was chaired by Gerard Hogan S.C. It reported in 2007 making recommendations for a number of changes to Irish criminal law, including adverse inferences to be drawn from the exercise of the right to silence in certain circumstances (which had been the subject of an interim report), wider provision for admission of adverse character evidence, rolling back the exclusionary rule by way of court discretion to admit unconstitutionally obtained evidence, provision for disposing of admissibility issues pre-trial, and allowing acquittals to be reopened following new evidence, with-prejudice prosecution appeals, allowing an acquittal to be overturned and a re-trial ordered on appeal, and requiring defence disclosure of expert evidence.

== Implementation ==
The bulk of the group's recommendations have been implemented, and in the case of the interim report on the right to silence, publication of the implementing Bill occurred as soon as some weeks after the report was published.

Part 4 of the Criminal Justice Act 2007 provided for adverse inferences to be drawn from the accused's failure to mention particular facts or account for objects, marks, or his or her presence in a particular place, in line with the Group's report.

Part 3 of the Criminal Procedure Act 2010 provides for re-trial following acquittal in certain circumstances recommended by the Group. Part 4 provides for with-prejudice prosecution appeals. Section 33 extends the circumstances in which adverse character evidence can be adduced, and section 34 provides for notice of defence expert evidence.]

The recommendation regarding rolling back the exclusionary rule was expressed to be following "the approach of seeing whether a change in jurisprudence emerges following use of the appeal provisions of the Criminal Justice Act 2006". Subsequently, in JC v Director of Public Prosecutions (2015), on a prosecution appeal, the Supreme Court changed the exclusionary rule.

The issue of allowing the determination of evidential issues before the commencement of the trial proper remains under consideration and is the subject of a Criminal Procedure Bill where heads were approved in 2015.
