= Anthony Collins (judge) =

Irish judge

The Hon. Mr. Justice Anthony M. Collins

Judge of the Court of Appeal
- Incumbent
- Assumed office 10 December 2024
- Nominated by: Government of Ireland
- Appointed by: Michael D. Higgins

Advocate General of the European Court of Justice
- In office 7 October 2021 – 7 October 2024
- Nominated by: Government of Ireland
- Appointed by: European Council
- President: Koen Lenaerts
- Preceded by: Gerard Hogan
- Succeeded by: Dean Spielmann

Judge of the General Court of the European Union
- In office 16 September 2013 – 6 October 2021
- Nominated by: Government of Ireland
- Appointed by: European Council

Personal details
- Born: Anthony Michael Collins; 23 May 1960 (age 66) Hartford, Connecticut, U.S.
- Spouse: Muireann Noonan
- Children: 4
- Education: Trinity College Dublin; King's Inns

Anthony Michael Collins (born 1960) is an Irish judge who has served as a Judge of the Court of Appeal since November 2024. He previously served as Advocate General of the European Court of Justice from 2021 to 2024 and a Judge of the General Court of the European Union from 2013 to 2021.

== Early life and education ==
Collins was born on 23 May 1960 in Hartford, Connecticut, to Irish parents. He attended Trinity College Dublin from where he graduated with a B.A. degree in Legal Science in 1984. He attended the King's Inns to study to become a barrister.

He was involved in student organisations, acting as General Secretary of the Organising Bureau of European School Student Unions between 1977 and 1984, General Secretary of the Irish Union of School Students from 1977 to 1979 and was Vice President of the Council of European National Youth Committees between 1979 and 1981. He was also a member of the Labour Party.

== Legal career ==
He was called to the Bar of Ireland in 1986 and became a Senior Counsel in 2003. His legal practice encompassed European Union law and administrative law.

His involvement with the Court of Justice of the European Communities began in 1990, where he served as référendaire to Irish judges Thomas F. O'Higgins and John L. Murray. He returned to practice in 1997.

He is the co-author of a legal text Civil Proceedings and the State and edited the Irish Journal of European Law between 1992 and 2001. Having been employed as its Director between 1997 and 2000, he became President of the Irish Centre of European Law in May 2022. He is also an adjunct professor of University College Cork and a bencher of the King's Inns.

== Judicial career ==
=== General Court of the European Union ===
Collins was nominated to the General Court of the European Union by the Government of Ireland in May 2013, replacing Kevin O'Higgins as the Irish judge on the court. He was reappointed on 1 September 2019 for a further six-year term. He was elected as President of the Eighth and Third Chambers of the General Court in 2016 and 2019 respectively.

=== Advocate General of the European Union ===
In April 2021, Ireland's serving Advocate General of the Court of Justice of the European Union Gerard Hogan was nominated to the Supreme Court of Ireland. The Government of Ireland put in place a panel of Paul Gallagher, former Advocate General Nial Fennelly and former Ambassador Marie Cross to nominate a person to serve the remainder of Hogan's term. His nomination was announced on 28 May 2021. The Member States, acting by common accord, appointed him as Advocate General in September 2021, to serve between 7 October 2021 and 6 October 2024.

=== Court of Appeal ===
Collins was nominated by Taoiseach Simon Harris's government as a judge of the Court of Appeal on the 31st of October 2024 and was appointed by President Michael D. Higgins on the 10th of December 2024.
