= In re Article 26 and the Regulation of Information (Services outside the State for Termination of Pregnancies) Bill 1995 =

In re Article 26 and the Regulation of Information (Services outside the State for Termination of Pregnancies) Bill, 1995
- Court: Supreme Court of Ireland
- Full case name: In the matter of Article 26 of the Constitution and in the matter of the Regulation of Information (Services out-side the State for Termination of Pregnancies) Bill, 1995
- Decided: 12 May 1995
- Citations: [1995] IESC 9, [1995] 1 IR 1

Court membership
- Judges sitting: Hamilton C.J, …

Keywords
- Abortion; Natural law; Constitution of Ireland

In re Article 26 and the Regulation of Information (Services outside the State for the Termination of Pregnancies) Bill 1995 [1995] 1 IR 1 was a decision of the Supreme Court of Ireland after a referral by President Mary Robinson under Article 26 of the Constitution of Ireland. This is a procedure whereby the constitutionality of a bill is considered by the Supreme Court before it is signed into law, similar to the concept of a facial challenge in the United States. If the Court finds that it is constitutional, it may not later be challenged after its enactment.

The Supreme Court ultimately found that the Regulation of Information (Services outside the State for the Termination of Pregnancies) Act 1995 was constitutional, and decisively rejected the argument that natural law supersede positive law in the Constitution of Ireland.

== Background ==
Abortion has been legal in Ireland since 1 January 2019. At the time of this case, it was prohibited under the Offences against the Person Act 1861 (these provisions have since been repealed and replaced by the Health (Regulation of Termination of Pregnancy) Act 2018). Between 1983 and 2018, there was a constitutional protection of the life of the unborn in Article 40.3.3°, introduced by the Eighth Amendment, subsequently repealed by the Thirty-sixth Amendment in 2018.

In a number of cases, the Supreme Court had held that this provision of the Constitution prohibited information within the state on the availability of abortion services outside of the state. In AG (SPUC) v Open Door Counselling Ltd. (1988), the courts injunction restraining two counseling agencies from assisting women to travel abroad to obtain abortions or informing them of the methods of communications with such clinics, and in SPUC v Grogan (1989), the courts granted an injunction restraining three students' unions from distributing information in relation to abortion available outside the state.

== Fourteenth Amendment ==
In November 1992, the Fourteenth Amendment was passed, allowing information to supplied in accordance with law. The referendum was passed on the same day as the unsuccessful referendum on the Twelfth Amendment of the Constitution Bill, 1992 and the successful referendum on the Thirteenth Amendment, which responded to different aspects of the X Case.

After this amendment, Article 40.3.3° read in full as follows:

The State acknowledges the right to life of the unborn and, with due regard to the equal right to life of the mother, guarantees in its laws to respect, and, as far as practicable, by its laws to defend and vindicate that right.

This subsection shall not limit freedom to travel between the State and another state.

This subsection shall not limit freedom to obtain or make available, in the State, subject to such conditions as may be laid down by law, information relating to services lawfully available in another state.

The Oireachtas subsequently passed the Regulation of Information (Services outside the State for the Termination of Pregnancies) Act 1995. After convening the Council of State, President Mary Robinson referred the Act to the Supreme Court.

The Fourteenth Amendment was also repealed by the Thirty-sixth Amendment in 2018.

== Argument and Decision ==
Under Article 26.2.1°, the Supreme Court assigns counsel to argue against the bill's constitutionality; in this instance, counsel was assigned both to argue on the basis of the right to life of the unborn (Peter Kelly, SC, with Ralph Sutton, SC, and Mary Irvine) and to argue on the basis of the right to life of the mother (Frank Clarke, SC, with Inge Clissman, SC, and Fidelma Macken); the Attorney General Dermot Gleeson, SC, with Peter Shanley SC, Donal O'Donnell, Gerard Hogan and Bláthna Ruane, defended the bill's constitutionality.

In addition to the positive ban on abortion contained in Article 40.3.3°, previous judgments of the Supreme Court have emphasised the importance of natural law in the Irish constitutional framework, based partly on the preamble to the Constitution which refers to the "Christian nature of the State". Previous dicta from McGee v. Attorney General, G. v. An Bord Uchtála and Norris v. Attorney General indicated that notwithstanding the explicit positive law constitutional ban on abortion, even if Article 40.3.3° were not there, the natural law enshrined in the Constitution would prohibit the Oireachtas from legalising abortion.

The Supreme Court had to decide which was superior, positive law or natural law. The Attorney General argued the Bill was adopted pursuant to a valid constitutional amendment which had passed with a support of a majority of the voters in a referendum. Court appointed Counsel arguing against constitutionality submitted that the legislature and people could not amend the constitution in a manner inconsistent with natural law.

The Court therefore had to determine which was the ultimate rule of recognition for the State. Popular sovereignty is recognised in the constitution by allowing the legislature with a majority of the electorate to amend the constitution but catholic Christian traditions are recognised in the preamble, the wording of some of the articles and was probably in accordance with the original intent of its drafters. The Constitution contained ambiguous provisions (e.g. Article 6 "All powers of government, legislative, executive and judicial, derive, under God, from the people, whose right it is to designate the rulers of the State and, in final appeal, to decide all questions of national policy, according to the requirements of the common good.")

The Court decided that the foundation of Irish Constitutional law was popular sovereignty and rejected the idea that natural law could in any way limit the people's right to amend the constitution, provided they complied with the relevant provisions on adopting an amendment.
