= Miss D =

Miss D refers to an abortion case in Ireland, Amy Dunne was a girl who wanted to travel to the United Kingdom for an abortion. Her identity was kept private at the time, and she was referred to only as Miss D.

Amy Dunne was a teenage girl who became pregnant while under HSE care in 2007. A scan of the foetus showed it suffering from anencephaly. This fatal foetal abnormality means the baby would not live for long outside the womb. Dunne wanted to travel to the United Kingdom for an abortion, since abortion in Ireland was very heavily restricted. The Health Service Executive attempted to stop her going, by falsely telling her they had a court order preventing her from travelling, by saying they would resort to physically restraining her if needed, and they also wrote to the Garda Síochána asking them to stop her travelling. Since the Thirteenth Amendment of the Constitution of Ireland in 1992, it has not been illegal to travel outside Ireland for an abortion.

A High Court judge ruled that she had the right to travel to the UK, and strongly criticised the HSE's handling of the case. The HSE was ordered to pay costs, which were estimated at up to €1 million.

She had a medical, not surgical abortion in the UK. The HSE refused to state if they paid for the abortion.

== See also ==
- X Case
- C Case
- D v Ireland
- Death of Savita Halappanavar
- Eighth Amendment of the Constitution of Ireland
- Ms Y
- Protection of Life During Pregnancy Act 2013
- PP v. HSE
- Sheila Hodgers
