= Cora Sherlock =

Irish anti-abortion activist

Deputy Chairperson of Pro Life Campaign
- Incumbent
- Assumed office 2005; 21 years ago

Personal details
- Born: 1976 (age 49–50)
- Education: University College Dublin, Queen's University Belfast
- Profession: Solicitor
- Known for: Anti-Abortion campaigning

Cora Sherlock is a writer, blogger and campaigner in the Irish anti-abortion movement. She is deputy chairperson of the Pro Life Campaign. In 2014, she was included in BBC's 100 Women series.

== Early life ==
Sherlock is from Collon, County Louth. She studied law at University College Dublin in 1993, and while studying there, she joined the Pro Life Campaign. Sherlock completed a master's degree in Queen's University Belfast and qualified as a solicitor.

== Political campaigning ==
She has been a pro-life/anti-abortion campaigner and activist since the early 1990s. As deputy chairperson of the Pro Life Campaign she has written articles in national newspapers, and appeared on radio and TV on the abortion debate in Ireland.

=== 2002 Abortion Referendum ===
Sherlock called for a yes vote on the Twenty-fifth Amendment of the Constitution Bill 2001. The Pro Life Campaign also called for a yes vote. She argued that "a Yes vote signifies our acceptance of the Government's commitment to find a realistic alternative to abortion, a matter which those who intend to vote No have studiously ignored to date." She voted against the Treaty of Nice in the 2001 referendum.

=== Protection of Life During Pregnancy Act ===
Sherlock was opposed to the Protection of Life During Pregnancy Act 2013. She said "It's a bad law, with no evidential basis".

=== Referendum on the Eighth Amendment ===
Sherlock was opposed to the referendum on the repeal of the Eighth Amendment, which passed. She was opposed to the Citizens Assembly, and has spoken in favour of keeping the Eighth Amendment on newspaper, radio, and TV.

== Media ==
Sherlock has spoken on television and radio on behalf of the Pro-Life Campaign and the Love Both campaign, on programmes such as Vincent Browne Tonight and Prime Time. She has contributed articles and opinion pieces to newspapers, including The Irish Times, The Sunday Business Post, the Irish Examiner and The Irish Catholic.

During the 2018 referendum to repeal the eighth amendment, there was controversy when the Pro-Life Campaign wished to remove Sherlock from the RTÉ televised debate with Minister Simon Harris, in favour of Maria Steen. RTÉ refused to agree to the proposed change, and instead, Peadar Toibin TD was asked to debate on behalf of the Pro-Life side.

Sherlock's brother, Leo Sherlock, founded the online news website TheLiberal.ie in 2014. Cora Sherlock contributed articles to the website when it was founded, but none since 2014.

== See also ==
- Breda O'Brien
- David Quinn
- Youth Defence
- Abortion in the Republic of Ireland
