= Des Hanafin =

Irish politician (1930–2017)

Senator
- In office 17 September 1997 – 12 September 2002
- In office 5 November 1969 – 17 February 1993
- Constituency: Labour Panel

Personal details
- Born: 9 September 1930 Thurles, County Tipperary, Ireland
- Died: 22 June 2017 (aged 86) County Tipperary, Ireland
- Party: Fianna Fáil
- Spouse: Mona Brady (m. 1958)
- Children: 2, John and Mary

Desmond A. Hanafin (9 September 1930 – 22 June 2017) was an Irish Fianna Fáil politician who served for over 30 years as a member of Seanad Éireann (1969–93 and 1997–2002). He opposed social liberalisation, particularly the legalisation of abortion, divorce and same-sex marriage, and was one of the founders of the anti-abortion advocacy group, Pro Life Campaign.

== Personal life ==
Hanafin was born in Thurles, County Tipperary, in 1930, son of John Hanafin (1890–1953), a draper and newsagent who served for many years as a Fianna Fáil councillor for North Tipperary County Council and previously was a member of the Irish Republican Brotherhood and an elected Sinn Féin councillor.

He married Mona Brady, daughter of J. P. Brady, on 28 August 1958 in Clonmel, Tipperary. The wedding was followed by a reception at the Galtee Hotel, Cahir, which was attended by various notables including Rev. Father J. J. Hampson, President of Blackrock College. Their first child, Mary Hanafin, was born in June 1959, followed by John Hanafin in September 1960. Mary Hanafin is a former Fianna Fáil TD and government minister, and John Hanafin is a former Fianna Fáil senator.

Hanafin operated the Anner Hotel, located in Thurles during the 1960s. Initially successful, the business failed in 1967, which Mary Hanafin later blamed on her father's excess drinking. Subsequently, Hanafin was a director of the Transinternational Oil Company.

== Political career ==
Hanafin's first attempt to be elected to public office proved unsuccessful. In 1953, Hanafin sought to be co-opted to fill the vacancy on North Tipperary County Council created by the death of his father, John Hanafin. In the event councillors co-opted a Labour Party nominee, Michael Treacy, by eleven votes to seven.

He was elected a member of North Tipperary County Council in 1955, polling 934 first preference votes. Subsequently, in 1956, drawing support from the Clann na Poblachta representatives, he was elected Chairman of the County Council.

In 1957, he conducted a three-month tour of the United States, during which he was commissioned a Kentucky colonel, by then Kentucky Governor Happy Chandler. He was also awarded the freedom of Louisville, Kentucky, and received by Mayor Richard J. Daley of Chicago.

Hanafin was re-elected to North Tipperary County Council in 1960, polling 797 first preference votes. In 1961, he voted against the Fianna Fáil nominee for Chair of the County Council, Thomas F. Meagher, and in favour of the Clann na Poblachta nominee, Michael F. Cronin, who was elected by 10 votes to 9. In 1964, he controversially voted in favour of Jeremiah Mockler, "a former school mate", who was elected by 10 votes to 9 to the office of Rate Collector for Borrisokane.

He held the seat until 1985. He was first elected to Seanad Éireann in 1969 and retained his seat until the 1993 Seanad election at which he lost his seat by one vote. He regained his seat in the 1997 elections, and in 2002 announced his retirement from politics. He unsuccessfully contested the 1977 and 1981 Dáil elections for the Tipperary North constituency. He was a chief fundraiser of the Fianna Fáil party for many years.

=== Social issues ===
==== Same-sex marriage ====
In May 2015, he accused Yes campaigners in the same-sex marriage referendum of spreading a "palpable climate of fear", and called for a No vote.

==== Divorce ====
He opposed the legalisation of divorce, which was introduced in 1995, and attempted to overturn the referendum result in the Supreme Court, but was refused by the court.

==== Abortion ====
An opponent of abortion, Hanafin was one of the promoters of the constitutional amendment that enshrined the legal ban on abortion in the Constitution of Ireland. He was co-founder, chairman and later honorary president of the Pro Life Campaign.

== Death ==
On 22 June 2017, Hanafin died at the age of 86.

== See also ==
- Families in the Oireachtas
- Pro Life Campaign
