= Latin Mass Society of Ireland =

The Latin Mass Society of Ireland (LMSI), founded in 1999, is a Roman Catholic society based in Ireland that is dedicated to the preservation of the Tridentine Mass.

== See also ==
- Association for Latin Liturgy
