= Abortion Rights Campaign =

Irish abortion rights group

- Formation: 10 July 2012; 13 years ago
- Type: Abortion rights lobby group
- Location: Ireland
- Website: www.abortionrightscampaign.ie

The Abortion Rights Campaign (ARC) is an Irish abortion rights group. The group's goal is the introduction of free and legal abortion in Ireland and Northern Ireland. Prior to May 2018, the group campaigned for the repeal of the Eighth Amendment of the Irish Constitution, which was achieved with the passing of the Thirty-Sixth Amendment 2018. The ARC also campaigns for the Northern Ireland Assembly on behalf of abortion legislation.

== History ==
The Abortion Rights Campaign was founded by 40 people on 10 July 2012.

ARC was one of the main partner organizations in Together for Yes, the civil society group advocating a Yes vote in the 2018 referendum. One of ARC's founding members was a co-director of Together for Yes. ARC's network of regional groups across the island of Ireland formed the basis for many Together for Yes groups in several counties in Ireland.

In January 2016, they received a grant of €23,000 from Open Society Foundations for "educational and stigma-busting projects." SIPO, a national ethics watchdog, sent a warning, reasoning that the money had been raised for a political purpose and therefore non-compliant. The ARC returned the money in November 2016 "in order to comply with all regulatory frameworks".

== March for Choice ==
The Abortion Rights Campaign's annual March for Choice is normally held on the Global Day of Action for Safe and Legal Access to Abortion. The March for Choice is organized by ARC, attended by the public and various national abortion rights groups.

The most recent March for Choice was held on 29 September 2018, the first since the vote to repeal the Eighth Amendment. The theme was 'Free Safe Legal', the slogan of ARC.

The 2017 March for Choice was held on 30 September, and over 40,000 people took part. The rally at the march's conclusion was addressed by Bernadette Devlin McAliskey.
