= November 1992 Irish constitutional referendums =

Three referendums affecting the constitutional protection of the unborn

Twelfth Amendment of the Constitution of Ireland
- 25 November 1992
- Right to Life

Results
Choice	Votes	%
Yes	572,177	34.65%
No	1,079,297	65.35%
Valid votes	1,651,474	95.28%
Invalid or blank votes	81,835	4.72%
Total votes	1,733,309	100.00%
Registered voters/turnout	2,542,841	68.16%
- Results by 1992 Dáil constituency

Thirteenth Amendment of the Constitution of Ireland
- 25 November 1992
- Travel

Results
Choice	Votes	%
Yes	1,035,308	62.39%
No	624,059	37.61%
Valid votes	1,659,367	95.71%
Invalid or blank votes	74,454	4.29%
Total votes	1,733,821	100.00%
Registered voters/turnout	2,542,841	68.18%
- Results by 1992 Dáil constituency

Fourteenth Amendment of the Constitution of Ireland
- 25 November 1992
- Information

Results
Choice	Votes	%
Yes	992,833	59.88%
No	665,106	40.12%
Valid votes	1,657,939	95.70%
Invalid or blank votes	74,494	4.30%
Total votes	1,732,433	100.00%
Registered voters/turnout	2,542,841	68.13%
- Results by 1992 Dáil constituency

Three referendums were held in Ireland on 25 November 1992, the same day as the 1992 general election. Each was on a proposed amendment of the Irish constitution relating to the law on abortion. They were enumerated as the Twelfth, Thirteenth and Fourteenth Amendments. The proposed Twelfth Amendment was rejected by voters while both the Thirteenth and Fourteenth were approved.

== Background ==
The Eighth Amendment of the Constitution was approved in a referendum in 1983. It inserted a new sub-section in section 3 of Article 40. The resulting Article 40.3.3° read:

The State acknowledges the right to life of the unborn and, with due regard to the equal right to life of the mother, guarantees in its laws to respect, and, as far as practicable, by its laws to defend and vindicate that right.

The Society for the Protection of Unborn Children obtained two injunctions affecting the availability of information on abortion services outside of the state. In Attorney General (Society for the Protection of Unborn Children (Ireland) Ltd.) v Open Door Counselling Ltd. and Dublin Wellwoman Centre Ltd. (1988), an injunction was granted restraining two counseling agencies from assisting women to travel abroad to obtain abortions or informing them of the methods of communications with such clinics, and in Society for the Protection of Unborn Children (Ireland) Ltd. v Grogan (1989), an injunction was granted restraining three students' unions from distributing information on abortion available outside the state. The Fourteenth Amendment allowed for information on abortion under terms regulated by law.

In March 1992, the Supreme Court held in the X Case that a 14-year-old girl who had become pregnant as a result of rape could obtain an abortion in circumstances where there was a threat to her life from suicide. The proposed Twelfth and Thirteenth Amendments were held to reverse differing elements of the Supreme Court's judgment in the X Case in which it held that a risk of suicide by a pregnant woman could constitute a risk to her health which would justify an abortion, and that the courts had to power to grant an injunction preventing a pregnant woman from travelling abroad for an abortion. The Fourteenth Amendment also related to abortion and was introduced to reverse decision by the courts in the abortion information cases. In these cases — beginning with Attorney-General (Society for the Protection of the Unborn Child) v Open Door Counselling Ltd. — the courts had granted injunctions preventing individuals from distributing contact information for foreign abortion clinics.

== Wording ==
=== Twelfth Amendment Bill ===
The Twelfth Amendment of the Constitution Bill 1992 proposed that the possibility of suicide was not a sufficient threat to justify an abortion. The wording of the proposed amendment was:

It shall be unlawful to terminate the life of an unborn unless such termination is necessary to save the life, as distinct from the health, of the mother where there is an illness or disorder of the mother giving rise to a real and substantial risk to her life, not being a risk of self-destruction.

=== Thirteenth Amendment ===
The Thirteenth Amendment of the Constitution provided that the prohibition of abortion would not limit freedom of travel from Ireland to other countries where a person might legally obtain an abortion. The wording of the proposed amendment was:

This subsection shall not limit freedom to travel between the State and another state.

=== Fourteenth Amendment ===
The Fourteenth Amendment of the Constitution proposed:

This subsection shall not limit freedom to obtain or make available, in the State, subject to such conditions as may be laid down by law, information relating to services lawfully available in another state.

=== Accepted amendments ===
With the approval of the Thirteenth Amendment and the Fourteenth Amendment, the full text of Article 40.3.3° read as the follows:

The State acknowledges the right to life of the unborn and, with due regard to the equal right to life of the mother, guarantees in its laws to respect, and, as far as practicable, by its laws to defend and vindicate that right.

This subsection shall not limit freedom to travel between the State and another state.

This subsection shall not limit freedom to obtain or make available, in the State, subject to such conditions as may be laid down by law, information relating to services lawfully available in another state.

== Passage through the Oireachtas ==
=== 12th ===
The Twelfth Amendment Bill was proposed in the Dáil by Minister for Justice Pádraig Flynn. The Amendment was approved by the Dáil on 27 October 1992:

Twelfth Amendment of the Constitution Bill 1992: Final Stages. Absolute majority: 83/166
Vote	Parties	Votes
Yes	Fianna Fáil (63), Progressive Democrats (5)	68 / 166
No	Fine Gael (35), Labour Party (13), Democratic Left (6), Green Party (1), Independent (2)	57 / 166

Fianna Fáil Senator Des Hanafin, a member of the Pro Life Campaign (PLC), did not vote for the government wording. He proposed an amendment at committee stage proposing the wording supported by the PLC:

It shall be unlawful to act in such a way as to bring about the termination of the life of an unborn unless such termination arises indirectly as a side-effect of treatment designed to protect the life of the mother.

This wording was not voted on, and the bill was approved by the Seanad on 30 October 1992.

Twelfth Amendment of the Constitution Bill 1992: Final Stages. Absolute majority: 31/60
Vote	Parties	Votes
Yes	Fianna Fáil (26)	26 / 60
No	Fine Gael (11), Labour Party (2), Independent (3)	17 / 60

=== 13th ===
A previous amendment to the constitution had been proposed in a private member's bill by Labour Party TD Brendan Howlin on 12 May 1992. This proposed to insert the following subsection after Article 40.3.3°:

4° Sub-section 3 of this section shall not be invoked to prohibit or interfere with the exercise of the right—

i.to travel to and from the State for the purpose of receiving services lawfully available in other jurisdictions, or
ii. to obtain, within the State, information and counselling relating to such services.

The provision of such information and counselling may be regulated by law.

This was defeated at Second Stage the following day by 62 votes to 67.

The Thirteenth Amendment was proposed in the Dáil by Minister for Justice Pádraig Flynn on 21 October 1992. It was passed in the Dáil on 22 October and in the Seanad on 30 October. It proceeded to a referendum on 25 November.

=== 14th ===
A previous amendment to the constitution had been proposed as a private member's bill by Labour Party TD Brendan Howlin on 12 May 1992. This proposed to insert the following subsection after Article 40.3.3°:

4° Sub-section 3 of this section shall not be invoked to prohibit or interfere with the exercise of the right—

i.to travel to and from the State for the purpose of receiving services lawfully available in other jurisdictions, or
ii. to obtain, within the State, information and counselling relating to such services.

The provision of such information and counselling may be regulated by law.

This was defeated at Second Stage the following day by 62 votes to 67.

The Fourteenth Amendment was proposed in the Dáil by Minister for Justice Pádraig Flynn on 21 October 1992. It was passed in the Dáil on 22 October and in the Seanad on 30 October. It proceeded to a referendum on 25 November.

== Result ==
=== 12th ===
Twelfth Amendment of the Constitution of Ireland Bill, 1992
Choice	Votes	%
For	572,177	34.65
Against	1,079,297	65.35
Total	1,651,474	100.00
Valid votes	1,651,474	95.28
Invalid/blank votes	81,835	4.72
Total votes	1,733,309	100.00
Registered voters/turnout	2,542,841	68.16

Results by constituency

Results by constituency
Constituency	Electorate	Turnout (%)	Votes		Proportion of votes	
Constituency	Electorate	Turnout (%)	Yes	No	Yes	No
Carlow–Kilkenny	81,192	69.2%	20,130	32,900	38.0%	62.0%
Cavan–Monaghan	79,004	70.3%	20,494	31,290	39.6%	60.4%
Clare	65,579	67.9%	15,504	26,251	37.1%	62.9%
Cork East	58,160	71.9%	12,684	27,210	31.8%	68.2%
Cork North-Central	68,209	66.6%	13,876	30,024	31.6%	68.4%
Cork North-West	44,578	75.4%	9,346	22,225	29.6%	70.4%
Cork South-Central	75,747	71.1%	16,862	35,224	32.4%	67.6%
Cork South-West	44,627	73.8%	9,954	20,638	32.5%	67.5%
Donegal North-East	46,934	67.3%	8,313	21,496	27.9%	72.1%
Donegal South-West	48,494	62.2%	8,623	19,666	30.5%	69.5%
Dublin Central	59,941	61.3%	11,557	23,922	32.6%	67.4%
Dublin North	62,917	69.0%	16,037	26,309	37.9%	62.1%
Dublin North-Central	64,349	71.8%	14,302	30,815	31.7%	68.3%
Dublin North-East	57,888	69.7%	14,329	25,220	36.2%	63.8%
Dublin North-West	57,951	65.3%	12,485	24,251	34.0%	66.0%
Dublin South	84,767	70.5%	15,976	42,424	27.4%	72.6%
Dublin South-Central	63,316	64.4%	12,656	27,164	31.8%	68.2%
Dublin South-East	68,366	58.9%	10,361	29,097	26.3%	73.7%
Dublin South-West	69,654	61.9%	16,832	25,330	39.9%	60.1%
Dublin West	57,755	65.0%	14,461	22,258	39.4%	60.6%
Dún Laoghaire	85,924	68.7%	17,284	40,503	29.9%	70.1%
Galway East	42,604	68.8%	10,364	16,832	38.1%	61.9%
Galway West	78,539	63.7%	15,557	31,337	33.2%	66.8%
Kerry North	48,606	69.6%	9,885	21,464	31.5%	68.5%
Kerry South	44,034	70.1%	10,370	17,861	36.7%	63.3%
Kildare	77,798	65.3%	19,187	29,873	39.1%	60.9%
Laois–Offaly	77,226	70.2%	18,915	31,947	37.2%	62.8%
Limerick East	71,004	68.6%	14,799	31,800	31.8%	68.2%
Limerick West	44,768	71.3%	9,086	20,581	30.6%	69.4%
Longford–Roscommon	60,452	74.9%	16,155	25,701	38.6%	61.4%
Louth	65,666	67.3%	16,509	25,999	38.8%	61.2%
Mayo East	43,392	68.0%	10,055	17,044	37.1%	62.9%
Mayo West	43,407	68.4%	11,009	16,165	40.5%	59.5%
Meath	77,900	66.0%	19,570	29,688	39.7%	60.3%
Sligo–Leitrim	60,675	70.5%	14,817	24,887	37.3%	62.7%
Tipperary North	42,633	74.9%	10,102	19,693	33.9%	66.1%
Tipperary South	56,705	70.3%	12,713	24,952	33.7%	66.3%
Waterford	63,692	67.7%	13,372	27,852	32.4%	67.6%
Westmeath	46,128	67.0%	10,901	18,340	37.3%	62.7%
Wexford	75,553	69.6%	18,421	31,371	37.0%	63.0%
Wicklow	76,707	67.8%	18,324	31,693	36.6%	63.4%
Total	2,542,841	68.2%	572,177	1,079,297	34.7%	65.3%

=== 13th ===
Thirteenth Amendment of the Constitution of Ireland referendum
Choice	Votes	%
For	1,035,308	62.39
Against	624,059	37.61
Total	1,659,367	100.00
Valid votes	1,659,367	95.71
Invalid/blank votes	74,454	4.29
Total votes	1,733,821	100.00
Registered voters/turnout	2,542,841	68.18

Results by constituency

Results by constituency
Constituency	Electorate	Turnout (%)	Votes		Proportion of votes	
Constituency	Electorate	Turnout (%)	Yes	No	Yes	No
Carlow–Kilkenny	81,192	69.2%	32,818	20,479	61.6%	38.4%
Cavan–Monaghan	79,004	70.3%	28,116	23,680	54.3%	45.7%
Clare	65,579	67.9%	25,918	16,171	61.6%	38.4%
Cork East	58,160	71.9%	21,345	18,823	53.1%	46.9%
Cork North-Central	68,209	66.6%	25,456	18,440	58.0%	42.0%
Cork North-West	44,578	75.4%	15,524	16,171	49.0%	51.0%
Cork South-Central	75,747	71.1%	33,876	18,437	64.8%	35.2%
Cork South-West	44,627	73.8%	16,381	14,460	53.1%	46.9%
Donegal North-East	46,934	67.2%	12,253	17,537	41.1%	58.9%
Donegal South-West	48,494	62.1%	10,933	17,382	38.6%	61.4%
Dublin Central	59,941	61.3%	21,957	13,617	61.7%	38.3%
Dublin North	62,917	69.0%	32,687	9,758	77.0%	23.0%
Dublin North-Central	64,349	71.7%	30,826	14,316	68.3%	31.7%
Dublin North-East	57,888	69.6%	29,742	9,947	74.9%	25.1%
Dublin North-West	57,951	65.3%	25,640	11,374	69.3%	30.7%
Dublin South	84,767	70.4%	45,734	12,888	78.0%	22.0%
Dublin South-Central	63,316	64.5%	27,987	12,015	70.0%	30.0%
Dublin South-East	68,366	58.9%	27,966	11,417	71.0%	29.0%
Dublin South-West	69,654	61.9%	32,154	10,077	76.1%	23.9%
Dublin West	57,755	65.0%	26,112	10,682	71.0%	29.0%
Dún Laoghaire	85,924	68.8%	46,769	11,269	80.6%	19.4%
Galway East	42,604	68.9%	15,459	11,847	56.6%	43.4%
Galway West	78,539	63.8%	30,048	17,308	63.4%	36.6%
Kerry North	48,606	69.7%	16,732	14,951	52.8%	47.2%
Kerry South	44,034	70.2%	16,028	12,464	56.3%	43.7%
Kildare	77,798	65.3%	35,503	13,907	71.8%	28.2%
Laois–Offaly	77,226	70.2%	28,903	22,213	56.5%	43.5%
Limerick East	71,004	68.6%	28,774	18,143	61.3%	38.7%
Limerick West	44,768	71.4%	15,289	14,508	51.3%	48.7%
Longford–Roscommon	60,452	74.8%	23,079	18,953	54.9%	45.1%
Louth	65,666	67.3%	25,330	17,335	59.4%	40.6%
Mayo East	43,392	68.0%	15,094	12,232	55.2%	44.8%
Mayo West	43,407	68.4%	16,332	11,140	59.4%	40.6%
Meath	77,900	66.0%	32,099	17,434	64.8%	35.2%
Sligo–Leitrim	60,675	70.5%	22,573	17,314	56.6%	43.4%
Tipperary North	42,633	75.0%	16,103	13,872	53.7%	46.3%
Tipperary South	56,705	70.3%	20,064	18,000	52.7%	47.3%
Waterford	63,692	67.8%	25,879	15,589	62.4%	37.6%
Westmeath	46,128	67.1%	16,494	12,892	56.1%	43.9%
Wexford	75,553	69.6%	30,644	19,331	61.3%	38.7%
Wicklow	76,707	67.9%	34,687	15,686	68.9%	31.1%
Total	2,542,841	68.2%	1,035,308	624,059	62.4%	37.6%

=== 14th ===
Fourteenth Amendment of the Constitution of Ireland referendum
Choice	Votes	%
For	992,833	59.88
Against	665,106	40.12
Total	1,657,939	100.00
Valid votes	1,657,939	95.70
Invalid/blank votes	74,494	4.30
Total votes	1,732,433	100.00
Registered voters/turnout	2,542,841	68.13

Results by constituency

Results by constituency
Constituency	Electorate	Turnout (%)	Votes		Proportion of votes	
Constituency	Electorate	Turnout (%)	Yes	No	Yes	No
Carlow–Kilkenny	81,192	69.2%	31,463	21,684	59.2%	40.8%
Cavan–Monaghan	79,004	70.2%	26,934	24,919	51.9%	48.1%
Clare	65,579	67.9%	25,092	16,964	59.7%	40.3%
Cork East	58,160	71.8%	20,924	19,102	52.3%	47.7%
Cork North-Central	68,209	66.6%	24,266	19,689	55.2%	44.8%
Cork North-West	44,578	75.4%	14,674	16,910	46.5%	53.5%
Cork South-Central	75,747	71.1%	32,218	20,050	61.6%	38.4%
Cork South-West	44,627	73.8%	15,562	15,197	50.6%	49.4%
Donegal North-East	46,934	67.2%	12,395	17,538	41.4%	58.6%
Donegal South-West	48,494	62.1%	11,797	16,446	41.8%	58.2%
Dublin Central	59,941	61.3%	20,812	14,784	58.5%	41.5%
Dublin North	62,917	69.0%	31,534	10,983	74.2%	25.8%
Dublin North-Central	64,349	71.6%	29,253	15,815	64.9%	35.1%
Dublin North-East	57,888	69.6%	28,623	11,036	72.2%	27.8%
Dublin North-West	57,951	65.3%	24,485	12,474	66.3%	33.7%
Dublin South	84,767	70.4%	43,613	15,018	74.4%	25.6%
Dublin South-Central	63,316	64.1%	25,825	13,949	64.9%	35.1%
Dublin South-East	68,366	58.8%	26,557	12,573	67.9%	32.1%
Dublin South-West	69,654	61.9%	31,009	11,173	73.5%	26.5%
Dublin West	57,755	64.9%	26,235	10,478	71.5%	28.5%
Dún Laoghaire	85,924	68.8%	44,009	14,001	75.9%	24.1%
Galway East	42,604	66.5%	14,885	12,487	54.4%	45.6%
Galway West	78,539	63.8%	28,761	18,515	60.8%	39.2%
Kerry North	48,606	69.6%	15,875	15,683	50.3%	49.7%
Kerry South	44,034	70.1%	15,389	13,058	54.1%	45.9%
Kildare	77,798	65.3%	33,425	15,935	67.7%	32.3%
Laois–Offaly	77,226	70.2%	27,552	23,624	53.8%	46.2%
Limerick East	71,004	68.6%	27,100	19,823	57.7%	42.3%
Limerick West	44,768	71.3%	14,629	15,165	49.1%	50.9%
Longford–Roscommon	60,452	75.1%	22,402	19,686	53.2%	46.8%
Louth	65,666	67.3%	24,356	18,260	57.2%	42.8%
Mayo East	43,392	68.0%	14,434	12,857	52.9%	47.1%
Mayo West	43,407	68.4%	15,838	11,544	57.8%	42.2%
Meath	77,900	66.0%	30,493	18,978	61.6%	38.4%
Sligo–Leitrim	60,675	70.4%	21,659	18,164	54.4%	45.6%
Tipperary North	42,633	75.1%	15,403	14,614	51.3%	48.7%
Tipperary South	56,705	70.3%	20,144	17,878	53.0%	47.0%
Waterford	63,692	68.1%	25,661	15,971	61.6%	38.4%
Westmeath	46,128	67.0%	15,874	13,447	54.1%	45.9%
Wexford	75,553	69.6%	28,384	21,530	56.9%	43.1%
Wicklow	76,707	67.8%	33,289	17,104	66.1%	33.9%
Total	2,542,841	68.1%	992,833	665,106	59.9%	40.1%

== Later developments ==
The legislation anticipated by the Fourteenth Amendment was provided for in the Regulation of Information (Services Outside the State For Termination of Pregnancies) Act 1995. This bill was referred by the President to the Supreme Court prior to its enactment, which upheld it as constitutional, having assigned counsel to argue that it provided inadequate protection to the life of the unborn, and counsel to argue that it provided inadequate protection to the rights of a woman. It was found to be constitutional and signed into law on 12 May 1995.

No legislation was enacted in the aftermath of the defeated 12th referendum. In 2002, the proposed Twenty-fifth Amendment would have similarly excluded the risk of suicide as grounds for an abortion. On this occasion, the government proposal did have the support of the Pro Life Campaign. This too was rejected in a referendum, but by a much narrower margin.

The European Court of Human Rights found against the state in A, B and C v Ireland (2010). The government responded to this with the enactment of the Protection of Life During Pregnancy Act 2013, which provided for abortion in the cases where there was a risk to the life of the woman, including from a risk of suicide.

=== Repeal ===
On 25 May 2018, the Thirty-sixth Amendment of the Constitution was passed by referendum. It was enacted on 18 September 2018, replacing the previous text of Article 40.3.3° with:

3° Provision may be made by law for the regulation of termination of pregnancy.

== See also ==
- C Case
