= X Case =

Irish court case permitting abortion in exceptional circumstances

Attorney General, Harry Welehan v X
- Coat of arms of Ireland
- Court: Supreme Court of Ireland
- Full case name: The Attorney General v. X. and Others
- Decided: 5 March 1992
- Citations: Attorney General v X [1992] IESC 1, [1992] 1 IR 1

Case history
- Appealed from: Attorney General v X (High Court) 17 February 1992

Court membership
- Judges sitting: Thomas Finlay, Niall McCarthy, Hugh O'Flaherty, Séamus Egan, Anthony Hederman

Case opinions
- Under Article 40.3.3° of the Constitution, termination of pregnancy is only permissible where there is a "real and substantial risk to the life of the mother", including a real and substantial risk of suicide. To require there to be a risk of immediate or inevitable death would not adequately vindicate the right to life of the mother.
- Decision by: Finlay
- Concurrence: McCarthy, O'Flaherty, Egan
- Dissent: Hederman

Keywords
- Constitution; Personal Rights; Right to Life; Unborn; Right to Travel; Abortion; Suicide; Injunction

Attorney General v X [1992] 1 IR 1 (more commonly known as the "X Case") is a landmark decision of the Irish Supreme Court which established the right of Irish women to an abortion if a pregnant woman's life was at risk because of pregnancy, including the risk of suicide.

== Background ==
The case involved a fourteen-year-old girl (named only as "X" in the courts and the media to protect her identity) who was a ward of the state and who had been the victim of a statutory rape by a neighbour in December 1991 and became pregnant. X told her mother of suicidal thoughts because of the unwanted pregnancy, and as abortion was illegal in the state, the family planned to travel abroad for an abortion. Before the planned abortion was carried out, the family asked the Garda Síochána (police) if DNA from the aborted foetus would be admissible as evidence in the courts, as the neighbour was denying responsibility. The garda asked the Attorney General's office for advice. Attorney General Harry Whelehan sought an injunction under Article 40.3.3° of the Constitution of Ireland (which guaranteed "the right to life of the unborn") preventing her from having the procedure carried out. The injunction was granted by Declan Costello in the High Court in February 1992.

The High Court injunction was appealed to the Supreme Court, which overturned it by a majority of four to one (Anthony Hederman dissenting) in March 1992. The majority opinion (Chief Justice Thomas Finlay, Niall McCarthy, Séamus Egan and Hugh O'Flaherty) held that a woman had a right to an abortion under Article 40.3.3° if there was "a real and substantial risk" to her life. This right did not exist if there was a risk to her health but not her life; however, it did exist if the risk was the possibility of suicide. X miscarried shortly after the judgement. In 2013 Justice O'Flaherty, speaking after his retirement, said that the X Case was "peculiar to its own particular facts", since X miscarried and did not have an abortion, and this rendered the case moot in Irish law. According to O'Flaherty, his reasoning for agreeing to uphold X's right to travel to the United Kingdom for an abortion because of suicidal ideation, "The stark situation is, if someone who is pregnant commits suicide, you lose the mother and the child."

"The man in the X case", unnamed at the time to protect X's identity, was named in 2002 as Sean O'Brien (b.1949/50). In 1994 he was tried and convicted of defilement of a girl under 15 and sentenced to 14 years in prison, reduced on appeal to four years. He was released in 1997 and obtained a taxi driver's licence. In 2002 he was tried and convicted for the 1999 sexual assault and false imprisonment of a 15-year-old girl in his taxi; his three-and-a-half-year sentence was handed down the day before another abortion referendum.

=== Constitutional amendments ===
In late 1983 the Eighth Amendment had passed, to ensure that abortion would not be introduced by the judiciary, in a similar manner to the US case of Roe v. Wade (1973). The X case resulted in three proposed amendments to the Irish constitution on the issue of abortion, which were submitted to three referendums all held on 25 November 1992. These were the

- Twelfth Amendment: on the so-called substantive issue. This proposed that the prohibition on abortions would apply even in cases where the pregnant woman was suicidal.
- Thirteenth Amendment: specified that the prohibition on abortion would not limit the freedom of pregnant women to travel out of the state
- Fourteenth Amendment: specified that the prohibition of abortion would not limit the right to distribute information about abortion services in foreign countries.

The thirteenth and fourteenth amendments were ratified but the twelfth was rejected. In 2002 an attempt to overturn the suicide grounds was again defeated, in the Twenty-fifth Amendment.

In 2018 the Thirty-sixth Amendment of the Constitution of Ireland provided a clear result, allowing abortions to be performed in Ireland, with the X Case frequently cited before the vote as a reason for amending the Constitution.

=== European law ===
Ireland joined the EEC in 1973 (now the European Union), and an express provision in the relevant treaties was and is the principle of free movement of people within the EU. In Costa v ENEL (1964), the European Court of Justice had established that European law had primacy over national laws. The 1992 Maastricht Treaty allowed Ireland an exemption in respect of its laws on abortion. At the time of the Maastricht negotiations, it was thought that this exemption meant that the EU could never impose abortion laws upon Ireland. The X Case showed that the Irish government understood that its laws against abortion extended much further, even to a denial of the basic European law right of the free movement of people within the EU.

=== Political outcomes ===
Whelehan was later appointed as president of the High Court, but his office's stance on the X case, coupled with its lengthy delaying of the extradition from Northern Ireland of Brendan Smyth, on multiple charges of abuses against children, was met with severe and widespread criticism. The issue split and eventually brought down the coalition government of the time. Under political pressure, Whelehan served as a High Court judge for just six days.

There were regular calls, in subsequent decades, to "legislate for the X case", meaning to amend or replace the Offences Against the Person Act 1861 to permit and regulate abortion within the limited circumstances allowed by the 1992 judgment. This was eventually effected by the Protection of Life During Pregnancy Act 2013.

== TV interviews in 2010 ==
The Scannal programme by RTÉ was broadcast on 22 February 2010, suggesting that the underlying divisions of opinion still exist, and that the facts of the case were too difficult and unique for a simple resolution at the time. Some quotations appeared on RTÉ's website:

- Harry Whelehan said that: "The problem was stark. There was an unborn child with a constitutional right to life. There was nobody to advocate the right of that child to be born other than the Attorney General".
- "The State was going to force a child to bear a child for her rapist" said Fintan O'Toole, journalist.
- "You can't use the constitution for certain issues and not others. It is black and white – Harry Whelehan implemented the constitution and I believe he did the right thing." – Cathal Mac Coille, RTÉ journalist.
- "I remember Albert saying 'we're up to our necks in it now Diggy, they're all out to get us', and he was so right" – Seán Duignan, government press secretary in 1992.

== Breach of ECHR ==
In A, B and C v Ireland (2010), the European Court of Human Rights found that Ireland has breached the European Convention on Human Rights by failing to provide an accessible and effective procedure by which a woman can have established whether she qualifies for a legal abortion under Irish law, which led to the enactment of the Protection of Life During Pregnancy Act 2013.
