= Twenty-fifth Amendment of the Constitution Bill 2001 =

Proposed amendment to tighten the Irish constitutional ban on abortion

- 6 March 2002
- To tighten the constitutional ban on abortion

Results
Choice	Votes	%
Yes	618,485	49.58%
No	629,041	50.42%
Valid votes	1,247,526	99.47%
Invalid or blank votes	6,649	0.53%
Total votes	1,254,175	100.00%
Registered voters/turnout	2,923,918	42.89%
- Results by Dáil constituency

The Twenty-fifth Amendment of the Constitution (Protection of Human Life in Pregnancy) Bill 2001 (bill no. 48 of 2001) was a proposed amendment to the Constitution of Ireland to tighten the constitutional ban on abortion. It would have removed the threat of suicide as a grounds for legal abortion in the state, as well as introducing new penalties for anyone performing an abortion, by giving constitutional status to legislation proposed to be enacted after the amendment. It was narrowly rejected in a referendum held on 6 March 2002, with 50.4% against.

== Overview ==
In 1983 the Eighth Amendment introduced a constitutional ban on abortion in Ireland. The X Case in 1992 established the right of Irish women to an abortion if a pregnant woman's life was at risk because of the pregnancy, including from the risk of suicide. Later in 1992, three separate constitutional amendments on the subject of abortion were put to a vote. The Twelfth Amendment Bill, which would have excluded the risk of suicide as grounds for abortion was rejected. The Thirteenth Amendment, which guaranteed freedom of travel to obtain an abortion abroad, and the Fourteenth Amendment, which guaranteed access to information, were both approved.

The Twenty-fifth Amendment was a second attempt to exclude the risk of suicide as grounds for an abortion. It was introduced by the Fianna Fáil–Progressive Democrats coalition government led by Taoiseach Bertie Ahern. The government presented the amendment as one part of a comprehensive package of changes to address the issue of crisis pregnancy. Among other measures it would have removed the threat of suicide as a grounds for legal abortion and also would have introduced new penalties of up to twelve years in jail for those performing or assisting abortions. Along with the government parties, the Catholic Church favoured the proposal. It was opposed by Fine Gael, the Labour Party, the Green Party and Sinn Féin. The proposal was put to a referendum on 6 March 2002 but was narrowly rejected by 629,041 (50.4%) against to 618,485 (49.6%) in favour.

== Proposed changes ==
The Twenty-fifth Amendment was more complex than the proposal that had been rejected in 1992. It provided that abortion would be regulated for by specific legislation that would be named in the text to be added to the Constitution. The legislation, the Protection of Human Life in Pregnancy Act 2002, would be given the same protection as provisions of the Constitution, such that it could be amended only by referendum.

Article 40.3.3° reads

3° The State acknowledges the right to life of the unborn and, with due regard to the equal right to life of the mother, guarantees in its laws to respect, and, as far as practicable, by its laws to defend and vindicate that right.

This subsection shall not limit freedom to travel between the State and another state.

This subsection shall not limit freedom to obtain or make available, in the State, subject to such conditions as may be laid down by law, information relating to services lawfully available in another state.

The Twenty-fifth amendment would have ultimately added two sub-sections immediately following, as Article 40.3.4° and 40.3.5°:

4° In particular the life of the unborn in the womb shall be protected in accordance with the provisions of the Protection of Human Life in Pregnancy Act 2002.

5° The provisions of section 2 of Article 46 and sections 1, 3 and 4 of Article 47 of this Constitution shall apply to any Bill passed or deemed to have been passed by both Houses of the Oireachtas containing a proposal to amend the Protection of Human Life in Pregnancy Act, 2002, as they apply to a Bill containing a proposal or proposals for the amendment of this Constitution and any such Bill shall be signed by the President forthwith upon his being satisfied that the Bill has been duly approved by the people in accordance with the provisions of section 1 of Article 47 of this Constitution and shall be duly promulgated by the President as a law.

The proposed text of 40.3.5° would have ensured that the provisions of Article 46 on Amendments to the Constitution and Article 47 on Referendums would apply to any amendment of this Act.

=== Proposed Protection of Human Life in Pregnancy Act ===
The Twenty-fifth Amendment of the Constitution (Protection of Human Life in Pregnancy) Bill 2001 included the text of a proposed Act which would regulate the termination of pregnancy. It would have repealed Sections 58 and 59 of the Offences against the Person Act 1861.

Section 1 defined abortion as "the intentional destruction by any means of unborn human life after implantation in the womb of a woman". It further stated that abortion did not include "the carrying out of a medical procedure by a medical practitioner at an approved place in the course of which or as a result of which unborn human life is ended where that procedure is, in the reasonable opinion of the practitioner, necessary to prevent a real and substantial risk of loss of the woman's life other than by self-destruction". This would have excluded the availability of abortion where there was a risk of life due to suicide.

Section 2 defined abortion as a criminal offence, subject to imprisonment of 12 years or a fine or both.

Section 3 protected conscientious objection.

Section 4 affirmed the freedom to travel and to obtain information about abortion.

=== Amendment procedure ===
It was intended that after the passage of the Twenty-fifth Amendment, the Oireachtas would enact the Protection of Human Life in Pregnancy Act. The Amendment proposed to insert a number of temporary provisions in the Constitution to bridge the period between the enactment of the Twenty-fifth Amendment and subsequent enactment of the Protection of Human Life in Pregnancy Act.

The Twenty-fifth Amendment proposed first to add Article 46.5. This section provided that if the Protection of Human Life in Pregnancy Act were enacted, Article 46.5 would be omitted from every official text of the constitution, and the two new Articles 40.3.4° and 40.3.5° detailed above would be inserted. The Act would have to be in the form prescribed in the Schedule to the Amendment Bill. If no action was taken within 180 days then the whole constitutional amendment would cease to have effect. It also provided that the bill for the Protection of Human Life in Pregnancy Act could not be referred by the President to the Supreme Court or to an ordinary referendum (as it would have just received the approval of the voters in a referendum). This conditional form of amendment followed a similar procedure to the amendment of Articles 2 and 3 in 1999 after the passage of the Nineteenth Amendment in 1998.

== Passage through the Oireachtas ==
The Twenty-fifth Amendment of the Constitution (Protection of Human Life in Pregnancy) Bill 2001 was proposed in the Dáil by Minister for Health and Children Micheál Martin on 25 October 2001. It was approved by the Dáil on 5 December 2001:

Twenty-fifth Amendment of the Constitution (Protection of Human Life in Pregnancy) Bill 2001: Report Stage (Resumed) and Final Stage. Absolute majority: 83/166
Vote	Parties	Votes
Yes	Fianna Fáil (66), Progressive Democrats (3), Independent (4), Independent Fianna Fáil (1)	74 / 166
No	Fine Gael (47), Labour Party (19), Green Party (1), Sinn Féin (1), Socialist Party (1), Independent (2)	71 / 166
Source: Twenty-fifth Amendment of the Constitution (Protection of Human Life in Pregnancy) Bill 2001: Report Stage (Resumed) and Final Stage.

The Bill was approved by the Seanad on 13 December 2001:

Twenty-fifth Amendment of the Constitution (Protection of Human Life in Pregnancy) Bill 2001: Report and Final Stages. Absolute majority: 31/60
Vote	Parties	Votes
Yes	Fianna Fáil (18), Progressive Democrats (3)	21 / 60
No	Fine Gael (9), Labour Party (2), Independent (3)	14 / 60
Source: Twenty-fifth Amendment of the Constitution (Protection of Human Life in Pregnancy) Bill 2001: Report and Final Stages.

== Result ==
The amendment was then put to a referendum on 6 March 2002, where it was rejected.

Twenty-fifth Amendment of the Constitution of Ireland Bill 2002
Choice	Votes	%
For	618,485	49.58
Against	629,041	50.42
Total	1,247,526	100.00
Valid votes	1,247,526	99.47
Invalid/blank votes	6,649	0.53
Total votes	1,254,175	100.00
Registered voters/turnout	2,923,918	42.89

Results by constituency
Constituency	Electorate	Turnout (%)	Votes		Proportion of votes	
Constituency	Electorate	Turnout (%)	Yes	No	Yes	No
Carlow–Kilkenny	94,668	43.0%	22,619	17,889	55.8%	44.2%
Cavan–Monaghan	86,865	40.7%	23,171	11,956	66.0%	34.0%
Clare	77,519	39.3%	17,498	12,780	57.8%	42.2%
Cork East	70,122	43.2%	16,897	13,281	56.0%	44.0%
Cork North-Central	75,794	41.9%	15,624	15,943	49.5%	50.5%
Cork North-West	50,367	45.8%	14,175	8,749	61.8%	38.2%
Cork South-Central	92,322	47.5%	19,979	23,611	45.8%	54.2%
Cork South-West	51,531	42.0%	11,527	9,931	53.7%	46.3%
Donegal North-East	56,794	33.6%	13,394	5,580	70.6%	29.4%
Donegal South-West	53,443	34.1%	12,084	6,001	66.8%	33.2%
Dublin Central	62,925	39.6%	10,178	14,634	41.0%	59.0%
Dublin North	72,175	49.6%	12,877	22,829	36.1%	63.9%
Dublin North-Central	64,262	52.4%	14,070	19,473	41.9%	58.1%
Dublin North-East	60,015	50.2%	10,763	19,259	35.8%	64.2%
Dublin North-West	57,761	45.9%	11,064	15,286	42.0%	58.0%
Dublin South	94,179	53.1%	17,451	32,339	35.1%	64.9%
Dublin South-Central	65,990	47.1%	12,241	18,662	39.6%	60.4%
Dublin South-East	60,251	48.3%	9,414	19,558	32.5%	67.5%
Dublin South-West	82,070	42.0%	12,369	21,933	36.1%	63.9%
Dublin West	80,757	45.5%	13,285	23,344	36.3%	63.7%
Dún Laoghaire	87,186	53.2%	14,653	31,476	31.8%	68.2%
Galway East	67,485	38.2%	16,170	9,424	63.2%	36.8%
Galway West	84,258	38.3%	15,996	16,101	49.8%	50.2%
Kerry North	54,137	37.1%	11,439	8,537	57.3%	42.7%
Kerry South	49,527	39.0%	11,392	7,759	59.5%	40.5%
Kildare North	61,301	44.0%	11,446	15,415	42.6%	57.4%
Kildare South	52,386	39.3%	10,110	10,375	49.3%	50.7%
Laois–Offaly	93,648	40.6%	23,207	14,618	61.4%	38.6%
Limerick East	81,136	42.6%	16,485	17,890	48.0%	52.0%
Limerick West	50,505	42.5%	12,543	8,786	58.8%	41.2%
Longford–Roscommon	68,485	39.3%	17,093	9,650	63.9%	36.1%
Louth	80,663	42.2%	17,015	16,808	50.3%	49.7%
Mayo	91,805	35.2%	19,797	12,334	61.6%	38.4%
Meath	107,309	40.9%	22,698	21,012	51.9%	48.1%
Sligo–Leitrim	67,759	38.7%	15,429	10,602	59.3%	40.7%
Tipperary North	57,211	41.9%	15,197	8,647	63.7%	36.3%
Tipperary South	54,272	41.9%	13,099	9,459	58.1%	41.9%
Waterford	72,772	44.4%	15,873	16,286	49.4%	50.6%
Westmeath	52,897	38.8%	11,888	8,497	58.3%	41.7%
Wexford	92,603	41.0%	19,487	18,295	51.6%	48.4%
Wicklow	86,763	47.3%	16,788	24,032	41.1%	58.9%
Total	2,923,918	42.9%	618,485	629,041	49.6%	50.4%

== Aftermath ==
No legislation on abortion followed this referendum. Eleven years later, under a coalition government of Fine Gael and the Labour Party, the Protection of Life During Pregnancy Act 2013 was enacted, which provided for abortion in circumstances where there was a real and substantial threat to life of the pregnant woman, including from a risk of suicide.

In 2018, the Thirty-sixth Amendment of the Constitution of Ireland was approved, allowing for abortion.

== Opinion polling ==
Date(s) conducted	Polling organisation/client	Yes	No	Would not vote	No opinion	Lead
25–26 Feb 2002	MRBI/Irish Times	35%	31%	11%	23%	4%
21–22 Jan 2002	MRBI/Irish Times	39%	34%	6%	21%	5%

== See also ==
- Abortion in the Republic of Ireland
- Politics of the Republic of Ireland
