= Eighth Amendment of the Constitution of Ireland =

Amendment recognising foetal rights

- 7 September 1983
- "The State acknowledges the right to life of the unborn and, with due regard to the equal right to life of the mother, guarantees in its laws to respect, and, as far as practicable, by its laws to defend and vindicate that right."

Results
Choice	Votes	%
Yes	841,233	66.90%
No	416,136	33.10%
Valid votes	1,257,369	99.32%
Invalid or blank votes	8,625	0.68%
Total votes	1,265,994	100.00%
Registered voters/turnout	2,358,651	53.67%
- Results by Dáil constituency

The Eighth Amendment of the Constitution Act 1983 was an amendment to the Constitution of Ireland which inserted a subsection recognising "the equal right to life of the pregnant woman and the unborn". Abortion had been subject to criminal penalty in Ireland since at least 1861; the amendment ensured that legislation or judicial interpretation would be restricted to allowing abortion in circumstances where the life of a pregnant woman was at risk. It was approved by referendum on 7 September 1983 and signed into law on 7 October 1983. In 2018, it was repealed by the thirty-sixth amendment.

The amendment was adopted during the Fine Gael–Labour Party coalition government led by Garret FitzGerald, but was drafted by the previous Fianna Fáil government of Charles Haughey. Fianna Fáil supported the amendment, while Fine Gael and Labour generally abstained in the Dáil vote. The Workers' Party was the only party to vote unanimously against the Bill in the Dáil. No TD or Senator expressed support for legalising abortion. The Catholic hierarchy and many lay Catholic organisations supported the amendment, but it was opposed by the authorities of other mainstream churches. After a bitter referendum campaign, the amendment was passed by 67% voting in favour to 33% voting against.

== Changes to the text ==
The Amendment inserted a new sub-section after section 3 of Article 40. The resulting Article 40.3.3° read:

The State acknowledges the right to life of the unborn and, with due regard to the equal right to life of the mother, guarantees in its laws to respect, and, as far as practicable, by its laws to defend and vindicate that right.

== Background ==
As per sections 58 and 59 of the Offences against the Person Act 1861, abortion was already illegal in Ireland. However, anti-abortion campaigners feared the possibility of a judicial ruling in favour of allowing abortion. In McGee v. Attorney General (1973), the Supreme Court of Ireland had ruled against provisions of the Criminal Law Amendment Act 1935 prohibiting the sale and importation of contraception on the grounds that the reference in Article 41 to the "imprescriptable rights, antecedent and superior to all positive law" of the family conferred upon spouses a broad right to privacy in marital affairs, echoing the reasoning of the US Supreme Court in Griswold v. Connecticut (1965)

The Pro-Life Amendment Campaign (PLAC) was founded in April 1981 to campaign for a constitutional amendment which would guarantee against a ruling in Ireland similar to the United States Supreme Court ruling in Roe v. Wade legalising abortion, which was based on the Griswold precedent PLAC met with each of the leaders of the main parties and Garret Fitzgerald, leader of Fine Gael, immediately endorsed their proposal. Charles Haughey, Taoiseach and leader of Fianna Fáil, said he was "not opposed in principle" while Frank Cluskey, leader of the Labour Party, said he would consider the proposal while affirming his party's opposition to abortion. Garret Fitzgerald became Taoiseach in July 1981 but his coalition government fell in January 1981 and it was the subsequent, short-lived Fianna Fáil government which introduced the Bill to amend the Constitution.

== Oireachtas debate ==
The Eighth Amendment of the Constitution Bill 1982 was introduced on 2 November 1982 by Minister for Health Michael Woods on behalf of the Fianna Fáil minority government. The Bill proposed to add Article 40.3.3° to the Constitution, with the wording shown above, if approved by referendum. This wording differed from the PLAC proposal by the inclusion of a balancing phrase - "with due regard to the equal right to life of the mother"- which would prove immensely consequential.

On 4 November, the minority Fianna Fáil government lost a motion of confidence in the Dáil, leading to the November 1982 general election. After the election, a coalition government of Fine Gael and the Labour Party was formed, with Garret FitzGerald as Taoiseach. Minister for Health Barry Desmond of the Labour Party declined to reintroduce the Amendment Bill; instead, it was Fine Gael Minister for Justice Michael Noonan who on 2 February moved to restore the Eighth Amendment Bill to the Order Paper.

Attorney General Peter Sutherland advised that the wording as proposed was dangerously flawed. Speaking against the original wording during the Dáil debate, Fine Gael TD Alan Shatter, author of the best-selling "Family Law in Ireland" said:

The irony is that I have no doubt, not merely from the interpretation the Attorney General has given but from the other interpretations that can be validly taken from the amendment, that if it in its present form becomes part of our Constitution it will essentially secure a constitutional judgment in the not too distant future requiring the House to enact legislation to permit women to have abortions.

— Dáil Eireann Debate Vol. 340 No. 3 Col. 533.

To remedy the perceived weaknesses in the original wording of the amendment bill, the government proposed an amendment to the bill during the committee stage with the following alternative wording:

3° Nothing in this Constitution shall be invoked to invalidate, or to deprive of force or effect, any provision of a law on the ground that it prohibits abortion.

This amendment would block any judicial effort to legalise abortion, as in Roe v. Wade, but it would place on limits on future legislation. Speaking against the alternative wording Michael Woods said:

The amendment proposed by Fine Gael would not protect the constitutional right to life of the mother against attack by any future legislation which sought to prohibit abortion in all circumstances even when the life of the mother was at risk. This is a defect which could be important in the future. Such legislation could not be declared unconstitutional on the grounds that it ignored a mother's right to life because the Fine Gael wording provides that nothing in the Constitution may be invoked to invalidate any law which prohibits abortion.

— Dáil Éireann Debate Vol. 341 No. 10 Col. 2021

A number of backbench Fine Gael TDs who supported the Fianna Fáil wording voted against the government amendment, which was defeated by 87 to 65. Fine Gael and Labour then abstained in subsequent votes on the Bill although some Fine Gael TDs continued to vote in favour and a few Labour TDs voted against. The Workers' Party was the only party which opposed the Bill on its final reading. Both its TDs, Tomás Mac Giolla and Proinsias De Rossa, voted against its passage on 27 April 1983. The original wording proposed by Fianna Fáil was then approved by 85 votes to 11 votes in the Dáil, and by 14 votes to 6 in the Seanad, and put to a referendum.

Dáil vote on Final Reading of Eighth Amendment of the Constitution Bill, 1982 Absolute majority: 83/166
Vote	Parties	Votes
Yes	Fianna Fáil (73), Fine Gael (7), Labour Party (5), Independent Fianna Fáil (1)	85 / 165
No	Labour Party (8), Workers' Party (2), Independent (1)	11 / 165
Not voting	Fine Gael (63), Labour Party (3), Fianna Fáil (1), Ceann Comhairle (1)	70 / 165
Source: Eighth Amendment of the Constitution Bill, 1982: Committee Stage (Resumed) and Final Stages.

== Referendum campaign ==
The referendum was legally organised by the Government but neither party in government actively campaigned. A few liberal members of Fine Gael and Labour campaigned against the referendum and, shortly before polling day, Garret FitzGerald declared that he would vote No. The amendment was supported by Fianna Fáil and some conservative members of Fine Gael and Labour. PLAC supported the amendment despite its misgivings on the wording. The Catholic hierarchy and many Catholic associations also supported the amendment while the Irish Council of Churches (representing the main Protestant churches) campaigned against it. Various groups campaigned against the amendment under the umbrella name of the Anti-Amendment Campaign (AAC) which included the Labour senators and future Presidents of Ireland, Mary Robinson, and Michael D. Higgins. The AAC was supported by the main trade unions, feminist campaigners, and many leading figures in the arts. Sinn Féin and the Workers' Party opposed the amendment,

The Workers' Party conducted a separate campaign from the Anti-Amendment Campaign, emphasising civil liberties and religious pluralism. Its activists distributed leaflets and posters and canvassed door to door against the amendment, while the party continued to distinguish its opposition to the constitutional change from support for legalising abortion. Following the referendum, Fianna Fáil minister Michael Woods attributed the high No vote in some working-class districts of Dublin to the Workers' Party's campaigning.

Anti-Amendment campaigners warned the vague nature of the amendment, the sectarian nature of it, the possible risk to the health treatment to pregnant women, and to the possible legal consequences for contraception, which the Pro-Life Amendment Campaign denied.

The Amendment passed on 7 September 1983 endorsed by 67% of those who voted. There was a clear rural/urban and East/West divide with some rural constituencies in the West of Ireland recording Yes votes of over 80% while the results in urban constituencies were more balanced with five Dublin constituencies voting No.

== Result ==
Eighth Amendment of the Constitution of Ireland referendum
Choice	Votes	%
For	841,233	66.90
Against	416,136	33.10
Total	1,257,369	100.00
Valid votes	1,257,369	99.32
Invalid/blank votes	8,625	0.68
Total votes	1,265,994	100.00
Registered voters/turnout	2,358,651	53.67

Results by constituency
Constituency	Electorate	Turnout (%)	Votes		Proportion of votes	
Constituency	Electorate	Turnout (%)	Yes	No	Yes	No
Carlow–Kilkenny	75,490	52.0%	26,751	12,134	68.8%	31.2%
Cavan–Monaghan	74,237	55.3%	33,165	7,556	81.4%	18.6%
Clare	61,747	48.9%	22,136	7,838	73.8%	26.2%
Cork East	54,309	57.1%	22,131	8,657	71.8%	28.2%
Cork North-Central	63,272	49.0%	19,877	10,862	64.6%	35.4%
Cork North-West	40,873	62.3%	20,554	4,694	81.4%	18.6%
Cork South-Central	69,102	55.7%	21,342	16,909	55.8%	44.2%
Cork South-West	41,614	58.0%	18,446	5,510	77.0%	23.0%
Donegal North-East	42,203	53.1%	18,475	3,807	82.9%	17.1%
Donegal South-West	45,823	47.2%	17,693	3,838	82.2%	17.8%
Dublin Central	70,403	49.6%	21,508	13,174	62.0%	38.0%
Dublin North	41,713	53.2%	11,898	10,228	53.7%	46.3%
Dublin North-Central	55,426	60.7%	19,203	14,301	57.3%	42.7%
Dublin North-East	46,686	58.6%	13,393	13,831	49.2%	50.8%
Dublin North-West	51,277	49.9%	13,354	12,105	52.5%	47.5%
Dublin South	72,964	62.2%	20,517	24,659	45.4%	54.6%
Dublin South-Central	73,510	51.0%	21,016	16,170	56.5%	43.5%
Dublin South-East	64,222	53.4%	16,814	17,292	49.3%	50.7%
Dublin South-West	58,429	55.3%	15,794	16,294	49.2%	50.8%
Dublin West	72,040	52.3%	20,510	16,960	54.7%	45.3%
Dún Laoghaire	73,030	58.6%	17,876	24,651	42.0%	58.0%
Galway East	43,043	50.0%	17,166	4,219	80.3%	19.7%
Galway West	78,497	41.0%	20,624	11,353	64.5%	35.5%
Kerry North	43,752	54.0%	18,027	5,383	77.0%	23.0%
Kerry South	41,929	54.3%	18,458	4,112	81.8%	18.2%
Kildare	69,559	48.4%	19,856	13,551	59.4%	40.6%
Laois–Offaly	73,073	55.0%	31,017	8,859	77.8%	22.2%
Limerick East	65,823	55.7%	24,963	11,520	68.4%	31.6%
Limerick West	42,822	54.3%	18,296	4,768	79.3%	20.7%
Longford–Westmeath	59,062	53.1%	23,665	7,363	76.3%	23.7%
Louth	59,415	55.0%	22,828	9,647	70.3%	29.7%
Mayo East	41,861	52.4%	18,261	3,534	83.8%	16.2%
Mayo West	41,445	47.9%	16,040	3,705	81.2%	18.8%
Meath	69,136	54.1%	27,117	10,054	72.9%	27.1%
Roscommon	41,302	54.6%	18,738	3,626	83.8%	16.2%
Sligo–Leitrim	59,682	54.5%	24,891	7,379	77.1%	22.9%
Tipperary North	41,069	58.5%	18,911	4,905	79.4%	20.6%
Tipperary South	54,267	53.8%	22,041	6,907	76.1%	23.9%
Waterford	57,531	53.2%	20,917	9,481	68.8%	31.2%
Wexford	67,557	59.0%	28,843	10,752	72.8%	27.2%
Wicklow	59,456	53.6%	18,121	13,548	57.2%	42.8%
Total	2,358,651	53.7%	841,233	416,136	66.9%	33.1%

== Judicial interpretation ==
In a number of cases, the Supreme Court had held that this provision of the Constitution prohibited information within the state on the availability of abortion services outside of the state. In AG (SPUC) v Open Door Counselling Ltd. (1988), the courts granted an injunction restraining two counseling agencies from assisting women to travel abroad to obtain abortions or informing them of the methods of communications with such clinics, and in SPUC v Grogan (1989), the courts granted an injunction restraining three students' unions from distributing information in relation to abortion available outside the state. These rulings were overturned by the Thirteenth Amendment and Fourteenth Amendment in 1992, which explicitly gave people the right to travel abroad for an abortion, and to receive information in Ireland about abortion available abroad.

In Attorney General v X (the X Case) in early 1992, the High Court granted an injunction to the Attorney General restraining a fourteen-year-old girl who had been raped from obtaining an abortion in England. On appeal, Supreme Court found that as the girl had shown a risk of suicide, to safeguard "the equal right to life of the mother" in Article 40.3.3°, abortion was permissible in this instance.

The Pro Life Campaign, a successor to PLAC, accused the Supreme Court of misinterpreting both the law and the will of the people. The Government and former Attorney-General Peter Sutherland dismissed such claims, arguing that, as they had claimed in 1983, the 'Pro-Life Amendment' was so poorly worded and ambiguous that it could facilitate either pro-abortion rights or anti-abortion interpretations in different circumstances. The Amendment was not reinterpreted by the Supreme Court on the grounds originally voiced by Peter Sutherland that it would lead to abortion prior to viability or kill women by refusing standard treatments for ectopic pregnancies, cancerous wombs, etc. There was no medical evidence called during the X Case hearings.

In PP v. HSE (2014), the High Court held that the constitution did not require a woman who was medically brain dead to be kept on life support to keep the foetus within her alive, because the chance of the foetus being born alive were "virtually non-existent". It is unclear how the case would have been decided if the pregnancy was further along.

In HSE v. B. (2016), the High Court declined to grant an order sought by the Health Service Executive permitting it to carry out a caesarean section against the will of a pregnant mother.

In an application for leave seeking judicial review of an order for deportation of a Nigerian man, Humphreys J held for the High Court in August 2016 that leave should be granted (i.e. the order for deportation quashed), in part because of the family rights of his unborn child by an Irish woman at the time of the deportation. The state appealed this decision. On 7 March 2018, the Supreme Court upheld the High Court and dismissed the state's appeal in a unanimous decision that the Minister is obliged to take into account the fact of pregnancy; however, it reversed other sections of the High Court and ruled the Minister is accordingly not obliged to treat the unborn as having constitutional rights other than the rights contained in Article 40.3.3°.

== Later referendums ==
Three referendums were held in November 1992. The Twelfth Amendment of the Constitution Bill, 1992 sought to exclude "a risk of self-destruction" as grounds for abortion, to overturn the central element of the decision in the X Case. This was rejected by 65% to 35%. The Thirteenth Amendment, permitting travel to obtain abortion in another jurisdiction, was approved by 62% to 38%. The Fourteenth Amendment, permitting information about services in other countries, was approved by 60% to 40%.

After these amendments, which became law on 23 December 1992, Article 40.3.3° read,

The State acknowledges the right to life of the unborn and, with due regard to the equal right to life of the mother, guarantees in its laws to respect, and, as far as practicable, by its laws to defend and vindicate that right.

This subsection shall not limit freedom to travel between the State and another state.

This subsection shall not limit freedom to obtain or make available, in the State, subject to such conditions as may be laid down by law, information relating to services lawfully available in another state.

A further referendum which proposed to insert legislation into the Constitution which would permit abortion where there was a threat to life but not where there was a risk of suicide, the Twenty-fifth Amendment of the Constitution Bill 2001, was narrowly defeated by 50.4% to 49.6%.

== Maastricht protocol ==
The Treaty on European Union, or the Maastricht Treaty, was signed on 7 February 1992. To assuage fears that free movement of services would lead to access in Ireland to abortion services, the government secured a protocol to the Treaty protecting the constitutional provision. The Maastricht Treaty was approved in a referendum in June 1992 by 69% to 31%. Following amendments to the Treaty on European Union affected by the Lisbon Treaty in 2009, this provision now reads:

Nothing in the Treaties, or in the Treaty establishing the European Atomic Energy Community, or in the Treaties or Acts modifying or supplementing those Treaties, shall affect the application in Ireland of Article 40.3.3° of the Constitution of Ireland.

== Legislation ==
The Protection of Life During Pregnancy Act 2013 replaced the abortion offences in the Offences against the Person Act 1861 and made statutory provision for the limited right to abortion established by the X Case. It replaced the offence of "unlawfully procuring a miscarriage" punishable to life imprisonment with the offence of "destruction of unborn human life", punishable by up to 14 years' imprisonment.

== Campaign to Repeal the Eighth Amendment ==
The Campaign to Repeal the Eighth Amendment has its roots in the unsuccessful Anti-Amendment Campaign in 1983. There was a campaign to Repeal the Eight Amendment after the X Case in 1992, and the three abortion referendums which followed it (the 12th, 13th and 14th). The campaign lay dormant for more than 20 years until the death of Savita Halappanavar in 2012. The Abortion Rights Campaign was founded in 2012. The #RepealThe8th hashtag was started on Twitter in 2012. The use of a social media to campaign to #RepealThe8th was an effective way to gain momentum leading up to the 2018 referendum. Twitter is recognised as 'one of the primary tools' for social justice, and in Ireland's case, allowed women to connect for collaborative social change despite the physical distance between them.

This campaign is led by a coalition of pro-abortion rights groups, including the Association for Improvements in Maternity Services (AIMS) Ireland, the Coalition to Repeal the Eighth, the Abortion Rights Campaign, Doctors for Choice, the Termination for Medical Reasons group, etc., and has support from a number of legal academics and members of the medical profession, including the Institute of Obstetricians and Gynaecologists. In the run up to the 2016 general election, a number of parties committed to a referendum to repeal the Eighth Amendment (Labour, Green Party, Social Democrats, Sinn Féin and Workers' Party) as well as a group of feminist law academics published model legislation to show what a post-Eighth Amendment abortion law could look like. In June 2016, Minister for Health Simon Harris stated his support for a referendum on repealing the 8th.

On 27 July 2016, the government appointed Supreme Court judge Mary Laffoy as chair of a Citizens' Assembly to consider a number of topics, including the Eighth Amendment. The Assembly recommended a referendum to remove and replace the 8th Amendment. In September 2017, the Oireachtas Committee on the 8th Amendment began its work considering how to give effect to this recommendation.

The 5th Annual March for Choice, organised by the Abortion Rights Campaign, took place in Dublin on Saturday 24 September 2016 marking the Global Day of Action for Access to Safe and Legal Abortion. The theme of the rally was Rise and Repeal. The attendance was estimated to be around 20,000. The 2017 March for Choice attracted 40,000 marchers, according to organisers.

On Saturday 21 July 2017, the Rally for Life was organised by prominent anti-abortion groups including the Life Institute, Youth Defence, and the Northern Ireland group Precious Life, in opposition to the campaign. A march held on 10 March 2018 at Merrion Square was estimated to have had a turnout of 15,000, although organisers claim up to 100,000 attended.

On 14 June 2017, the Taoiseach Leo Varadkar announced his government's intention to bring forward legislation to facilitate the holding of a referendum on abortion in 2018. On 9 March 2018, debate began in the Dáil on the Thirty-sixth Amendment of the Constitution Bill 2018, which would replace the current provisions on Article 40.3.3° with the following clause:

Provision may be made by law for the regulation of termination of pregnancy.

On 25 May 2018, the Irish people voted by 66.4% to remove the Eighth Amendment, choosing to replace it with the above text as a part of the Thirty-sixth Amendment to the Constitution, permitting the Oireachtas (parliament) to legislate for the regulation of termination of pregnancy. When it was signed in to law by the President of Ireland, it superseded the 8th, 13th and 14th amendments. 39 of the 40 Constituencies voted in favour, the constituency of Donegal being the only one to vote against.

== See also ==
- Abortion in the Republic of Ireland
- Contraception in the Republic of Ireland
- A, B and C v Ireland (2010), a case decided by the European Court of Human Rights
- Foetal rights
- Thirty-sixth Amendment of the Constitution of Ireland

House	1st stage	2nd stage	Committee stage	Report stage	Final stage
Dáil	2 Nov 1982; 2 Feb 1983	Feb 9, 17 (1) 17 (2), 23; Mar 2, 8, 24	Apr 27 (1), 27 (2)		Apr 27
Seanad		May 4, 5, 10, 11	May 18, 19 (1), 19 (2)	May 25 (1) 25 (2) 25 (3), 26	May 26
