= Candidates in the 2011 Irish general election =

A general election took place in Ireland on 25 February 2011 to elect the 31st Dáil. The closing date for nominations was 9 February 2011. A record 566 candidates put themselves forward, nearly a hundred more than in 2007, driven by a surge in the number of independents from 90 to 202. There was an average of thirteen names on the ballot in each constituency, while Wicklow had the most with twenty-four. 86 women contested the election, a numerical increase on 2007 but a decline in percentage terms. Four constituencies had no female candidate. Sixty-eight people under the age of thirty-five stood for election; the two youngest were both twenty-one. The oldest candidate, Ian McGarvey, was eighty-one years old.

Individuals from commercial and farming backgrounds were more likely to stand for Fine Gael or Fianna Fáil, while teaching and the legal profession were over-represented on Labour tickets. There was a marked increase in the number of people with business experience standing as independents at this election. Parties considered a wide range of characteristics when selecting candidates, including age, gender, career, geography and the strategies of other parties. By the time the election was called, selections were at an advanced stage, as the government had not been expected to last a full term. In 2007, the major parties had recruited a large number of personalities from the sporting world, including Graham Geraghty for Fine Gael and John O'Leary for Fianna Fáil. This time, however, there were far fewer recruits from outside politics, an outcome attributed to the failure of journalist George Lee's career as a Fine Gael TD.

== Political parties ==
Fianna Fáil stood 75 candidates, thirty-one fewer than 2007 and three fewer than the number of seats it had won at the last election. In four constituencies – Cavan–Monaghan, Cork North-West, Dublin North-West, and Dublin South-Central – the party nominated fewer candidates than it had outgoing TDs, effectively conceding a seat in each. A large number of Fianna Fáil members, including major vote-getters like Bertie Ahern, Noel Dempsey and Dermot Ahern, retired from politics at this election. The party's organisation was in disarray in late 2010 and early 2011 and the leadership had less control over selections than usual. Retirements helped Fianna Fáil reduce the size of its tickets to more competitive levels, but local organisations often selected more candidates than advised. The party ran two ministers, Barry Andrews and Mary Hanafin, in Dún Laoghaire, despite regarding only one seat as winnable and fearing two candidates would split the vote. The leadership had pressured Andrews or Hanafin to move to neighbouring Dublin South, where the party had no incumbent on the ticket, but both refused. The selection of the former Ceann Comhairle John O'Donoghue in Kerry South resulted in Tom Fleming resigning from Fianna Fáil and standing as an independent.

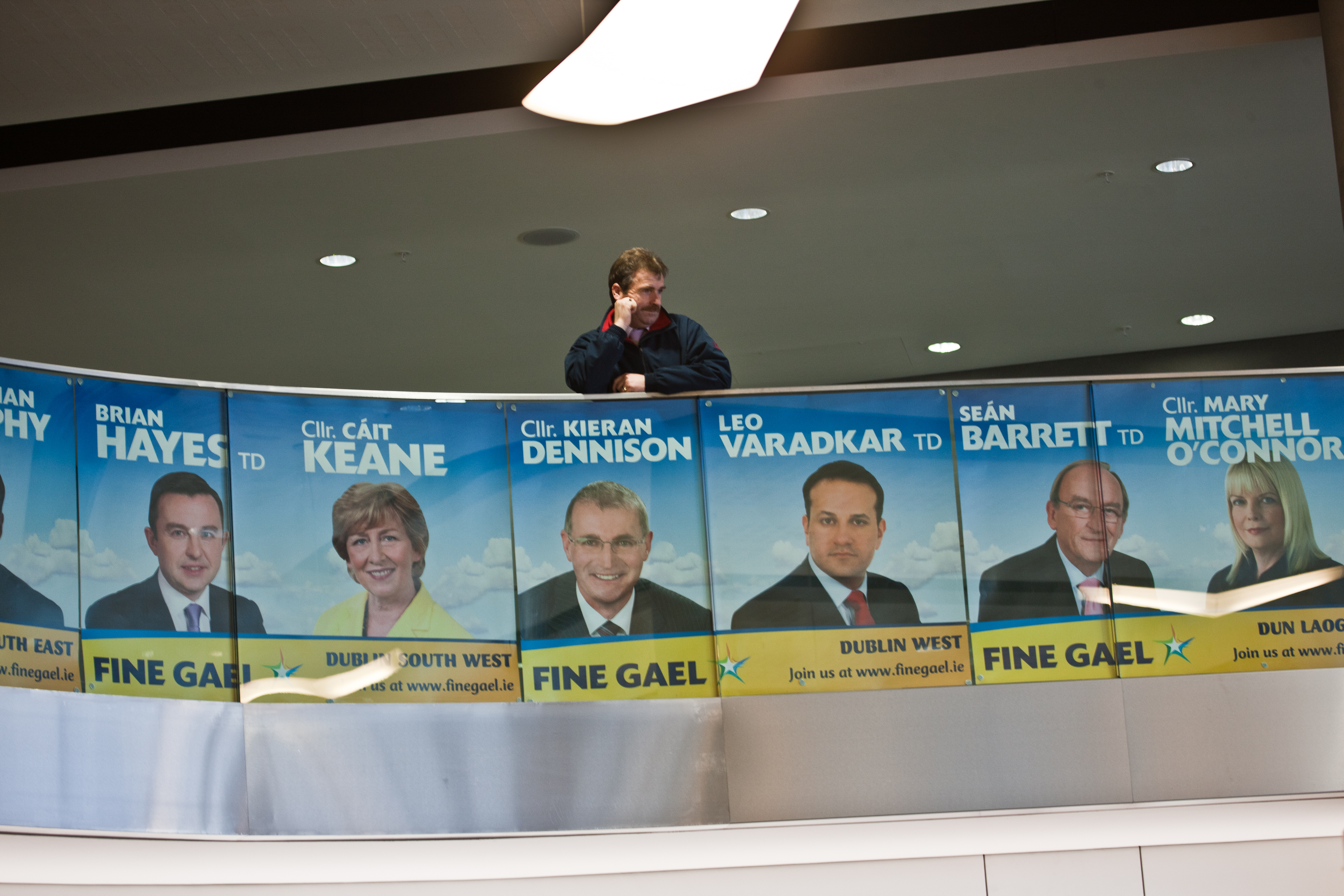
Fine Gael posters for candidates in Dublin

Fine Gael stood 104 candidates, up thirteen on 2007; they were the only party to run enough to win a Dáil majority. Phil Hogan and Frank Flannery were responsible for the party's selection process, which was centralised and tightly controlled. Pádraic McCormack lost his selection convention in Galway West to Brian Walsh and Fidelma Healy Eames and retired from politics. Party headquarters intervened to ensure the selection of a number of former Progressive Democrats to Fine Gael tickets, including Mary Mitchell O'Connor, Cáit Keane and Ciarán Cannon, who were seen as unlikely to win a vote of members. Fine Gael engaged in strict vote management in some areas. In Enda Kenny's constituency of Mayo the party sought to win four seats and carefully apportioned territory among its candidates. In some parts of Dublin electors were sent vote-management instruction letters signed by Kenny and Hogan.

Labour stood 68 candidates, eighteen more than in 2007, and all but one of its outgoing TDs had a running mate. The party's selection strategy was influenced by its experience at the 1992 election, when it was perceived to have stood too few candidates to take advantage of a spike in support. Labour recruited a number of independent politicians to stand at the election, including Michael McNamara, Jerry Cowley and Mae Sexton, a former Progressive Democrat. The defeat of Rebecca Moynihan by three men in the selection vote for Dublin South-Central and 31-year-old Cian O'Callaghan by two older candidates in Dublin North-East generated outcry within the party. In Sligo–North Leitrim, the selection of journalist Susan O'Keeffe as Labour candidate resulted in councillor Veronica Cawley resigning from the party and standing as an independent. Two defeated candidates quit the Labour Party in Laois–Offaly: one stood as an independent and another for the United Left Alliance.

The Green Party stood 43 candidates, one in each constituency. Despite poor polling over its time in government, the party believed it was important to stand everywhere, both for symbolic reasons and to improve the party's chances of getting the 2 per cent national vote needed to qualify for public funding. In contrast to the deluge of Fianna Fáil retirements, all six outgoing Green TDs contested the election.

Sinn Féin stood 41 candidates. In November 2010, party president Gerry Adams announced he would resign from the House of Commons and the Northern Ireland Assembly to contest the Dáil election in Louth, where Arthur Morgan was retiring. Adams' venture into southern politics, combined with Pearse Doherty's by-election win the same month, boosted the party's organisation and contributed to a sense that Sinn Féin now had a sharper and more anti-establishment image.

== Independents and new groupings ==
During the economic crisis, there was much discussion of the need for a new party, motivated by the perceived failure of the established political forces. The circumstances were arguably similar to the mid-1980s, when the Progressive Democrats had been founded, and in 2010 a Sunday Independent poll suggested that a majority believed a new party was required. One new group, Libertas, founded by businessman Declan Ganley, had played a major role in the defeat of the Lisbon Treaty referendum in 2008, but disappointing results at the 2009 European elections precipitated its demise. Writing in 2012, the academic Liam Weeks observed that while Ireland had fewer political parties than other European countries of its size during the crisis period, Irish voters had a long history of spurning new options, especially those not formed from splits or mergers of existing groups.

A number of public figures, including journalists Fintan O'Toole, David McWilliams and Eamon Dunphy, discussed forming a loose alliance called "Democracy Now". They intended to reform the political system and replace the IMF bailout agreement with a structured debt default. Although the group was reported to have €400,000 to fund an election campaign, the collapse of the government at the end of 2010 did not give it enough time to prepare. In late January 2011, O'Toole wrote that "the risk of going off half-cocked seemed to outweigh the hope of making a difference". Some individuals associated with the group, including Finian McGrath and Catherine Murphy, stood as independents at the election. New Vision, a separate alliance of independents created by Eamonn Blaney with similar views to Democracy Now, fielded twenty candidates, among them Luke 'Ming' Flanagan, Sharon Keogan and John McGuirk.

A number of small left-wing parties joined forces to create the United Left Alliance (ULA) in November 2010. It stood twenty candidates. The group consisted of People Before Profit, the Socialist Party, the Workers and Unemployed Action Group, as well as some former Labour Party members. Three of its candidates, Declan Bree, Joe Higgins and Séamus Healy, were former TDs. The ULA opposed the EU–IMF deal and the government's austerity policies, advocating heavy taxes on the wealthy and a general strike. It failed to register in time to get its name on the ballot. Also on the left, Fís Nua, a new party including several former Green Party members opposed to coalition, stood six candidates.

The public debate over the lack of experts in Irish politics may have contributed to an increased number of independents with economic and financial credentials standing at the election, including Shane Ross, Stephen Donnelly, and Paul Sommerville. Mick Wallace, a property developer, left-wing activist and the founder of Wexford Youths F.C., announced on television three weeks before the election that he would contest Wexford as an independent, saying "I cannot promise to deliver anything" when asked for his platform. Other high-profile independents were former members of parties, including Mattie McGrath (Fianna Fáil), John Halligan (Workers' Party), Noel Grealish (Progressive Democrats) and Thomas Pringle (Sinn Féin).

== List of parties ==
Party	No. of cand.	No. of const.	Leader (since) and constituency	Ideology
Fine Gael	104	43	Enda Kenny (2002); TD for Mayo	Christian democracy Centre-right
Fianna Fáil	75	43	Micheál Martin (2011); TD for Cork South-Central	Conservatism; Irish republicanism Centre to centre-right
Labour	68	43	Eamon Gilmore (2007); TD for Dún Laoghaire	Social democracy Centre-left
Green	43	43	John Gormley (2007); TD for Dublin South-East	Green politics Centre-left
Sinn Féin	41	39 (Note: Sinn Féin did not contest Clare, Dún Laoghaire, Kerry South, and Limerick.)	Gerry Adams (1983) (Note: Although Adams had been president of Sinn Féin since 1983, its leader in Dáil Éireann since 1997 had been Caoimhghín Ó Caoláin.); Contesting Louth (Note: Until 2011, Adams had represented Belfast West in the House of Commons and the Northern Ireland Assembly. He resigned both seats to stand for the Dáil.)	Irish republicanism Democratic socialism Left-wing
United Left Alliance	20 (Note: 9 from People Before Profit, 9 from the Socialist Party, 1 from the Workers and Unemployed Action Group and 1 Non-Party (Declan Bree). The United Left Alliance label did not appear on the ballot paper.)	19	Collective leadership	Democratic socialism Left-wing to far-left
New Vision	20 (Note: Candidates appeared as Non-Party on the ballot paper. The total number of candidates standing as Non-Party was 202.)	18	None	Independent
Christian Solidarity Party	8	8	Richard Greene (2011); Did not contest	Social conservatism Right-wing
Workers' Party	6	6	Mick Finnegan (2008); Contesting Dublin Mid-West	Communism; Irish republicanism Far-left
Fís Nua	6	6	None	Green politics Left-wing
South Kerry Independent Alliance	1	1	Michael Gleeson (1999); Contesting Kerry South	Localism
Independent	174	42 (Note: There was no independent candidate in Cork North-West.)	N/A	Independent

== Candidates ==
The table below lists all of the nominated candidates. Elected candidates are shown in bold text.

*: Outgoing TD
#: Member of the 23rd Seanad
§: Returned automatically without standing for election as outgoing Ceann Comhairle, in accordance with Article 16.6 of the Constitution of Ireland.

Constituency	Fine Gael	Labour	Fianna Fáil	Sinn Féin	United Left Alliance	Green	Independent	Others
Carlow–Kilkenny	**Pat Deering**; **Phil Hogan**; **John Paul Phelan**	**Ann Phelan**; Des Hurley	Bobby Aylward; **John McGuinness**; Jennifer Murnane O'Connor	Kathleen Funchion; John Cassin	Conor MacLiam (SP)	Mary White	Johnny Couchman; John Dalton; Stephen Kelly; Raemie Leahy; David Murphy; John O'Hara; Noel Walshe	
Cavan–Monaghan	**Seán Conlan**; **Heather Humphreys**; **Joe O'Reilly**; Peter McVitty	Liam Hogan	Margaret Conlon; **Brendan Smith**	**Caoimhghín Ó Caoláin**; Kathryn Reilly		Darcy Lonergan	Joseph Duffy; Caroline Forde; Seamus Treanor	John McGuirk (NV)
Clare	**Pat Breen**; **Joe Carey**; Tony Mulcahy	**Michael McNamara**	**Timmy Dooley**; John Hillery			Brian Meaney	Patrick Brassil; James Breen; Jim Connolly; Ann Cronin; Sarah Ferrigan; Brian Markham; Madeline McAleer; J. J. McCabe; Gerry Walshe	
Cork East	**Tom Barry**; Pa O'Driscoll; **David Stanton**	**Seán Sherlock**; John Mulvihill	Michael Ahern; Kevin O'Keeffe	**Sandra McLellan**		Malachy Harty	Patrick Bulman; Paul Burke; Claire Cullinane	Paul O'Neill (NV)
Cork North–Central	**Dara Murphy**; Pat Burton	**Kathleen Lynch**; John Gilroy	**Billy Kelleher**	**Jonathan O'Brien**	Mick Barry (SP)	Ken Walsh	Benjamin Ashu Arrah; Kevin Conway; Fergus O'Rourke	John Adams (An Chomhdháil Phobail); Pádraig O'Sullivan (NV); Harry Rea (CS); Ted Tynan (WP)
Cork North–West	**Michael Creed**; Áine Collins; Derry Canty	Martin Coughlan	**Michael Moynihan**; Daithí Ó Donnabháin	Des O'Grady	Anne Foley (PBP)	Mark Collins		
Cork South–Central	**Jerry Buttimer**; Deirdre Clune; **Simon Coveney**	**Ciarán Lynch**; Paula Desmond	**Micheál Martin**; **Michael McGrath**	Chris O'Leary		Dan Boyle	Seán Dunphy; Mick Finn; Eric Isherwood; Gerard Linehan; Ted Neville; Diarmaid Ó Cadhla; Finbarr O'Driscoll	David McCarthy (NV)
Cork South–West	**Jim Daly**; **Noel Harrington**; Kevin Murphy	**Michael McCarthy**	Denis O'Donovan; Christy O'Sullivan	Paul Hayes		Kevin McCaughey	Edmund Butler; John Kearney; Michael O'Sullivan	Paul Doonan (NV); Dave McInerney (NV)
Donegal North-East	**Joe McHugh**; John Ryan	Jimmy Harte	**Charlie McConalogue**	**Pádraig Mac Lochlainn**		Humphrey Murphy	Betty Holmes; Ian McGarvey; Dessie Shiels	MacDara Blaney (NV); Ryan Stewart (NV)
Donegal South-West	**Dinny McGinley**	Frank McBrearty Jnr	Mary Coughlan; Brian Ó Domhnaill	**Pearse Doherty**		John Duffy	Stephen McCahill; **Thomas Pringle**	Anne Sweeney (NV)
Dublin Central	**Paschal Donohoe**	**Joe Costello**; Áine Clancy	Cyprian Brady; Mary Fitzpatrick	**Mary Lou McDonald**		Phil Kearney	Christy Burke; Benny Cooney; Thomas Hollywood; John Hyland; **Maureen O'Sullivan**; Cieran Perry	Liam Johnston (FN); Paul O'Loughlin (CS); Malachy Steenson (WP)
Dublin Mid–West	**Frances Fitzgerald**; **Derek Keating**	**Joanna Tuffy**; **Robert Dowds**	John Curran	Eoin Ó Broin	Gino Kenny (PBP); Robert Connolly (SP)	Paul Gogarty	Colm McGrath; Jim McHale; Michael Ryan; Niall Smith	Mick Finnegan (WP)
Dublin North	**Alan Farrell**; **James Reilly**	**Brendan Ryan**; Tom Kelleher	Michael Kennedy; Darragh O'Brien		**Clare Daly** (SP)	Trevor Sargent	Mark Harrold	
Dublin North-Central	**Richard Bruton**; Naoise Ó Muirí	**Aodhán Ó Ríordáin**	Seán Haughey	Helen McCormack	John Lyons (PBP)	Donna Cooney	Paul Clarke; **Finian McGrath**	
Dublin North-East	**Terence Flanagan**	**Tommy Broughan**; **Seán Kenny**	Averil Power	Larry O'Toole	Brian Greene (SP)	David Healy	Robert Eastwood; Jimmy Guerin; Raymond Sexton	Eamonn Blaney (NV)
Dublin North–West	Gerry Breen; Bill Tormey	**Róisín Shortall**; **John Lyons**	Pat Carey	**Dessie Ellis**	Andrew Keegan (PBP)	Ruari Holohan	Sean Mooney	John Dunne (WP); Michael Larkin (CS); Michael J. Loftus (NV)
Dublin South	**Peter Mathews**; **Olivia Mitchell**; **Alan Shatter**	**Alex White**; Aidan Culhane	Maria Corrigan	Sorcha Nic Cormaic	Nicola Curry (PBP)	Eamon Ryan	Gerard Dolan; John Doyle; Buhidma Hussein Hamed; **Shane Ross**; Raymond Whitehead; Eamonn Zaidan	Jane Murphy (CS)
Dublin South–Central	Colm Brophy; **Catherine Byrne**; Ruairi McGinley	**Eric Byrne**; **Michael Conaghan**; Henry Upton	Michael Mulcahy	**Aengus Ó Snodaigh**	**Joan Collins** (PBP)	Oisín Ó hAlmhain	Noel Bennett; Neville Bradley; Seán Connolly Farrell; Gerry Kelly; Paul King; Dominic Mooney; Peter O'Neill	Colm Callanan (CS)
Dublin South-East	**Lucinda Creighton**; **Eoghan Murphy**	**Kevin Humphreys**; **Ruairi Quinn**	Chris Andrews	Ruadhán Mac Aodháin	Annette Mooney (PBP)	John Gormley	James Coyle; Mannix Flynn; Dylan Haskins; John Keigher; Hugh Sheehy; Paul Sommerville; Noel Watson	Peadar Ó Ceallaigh (FN)
Dublin South–West	**Brian Hayes**; Cáit Keane	**Eamonn Maloney**; **Pat Rabbitte**	Conor Lenihan; Charlie O'Connor	**Seán Crowe**	Mick Murphy (SP)	Francis Noel Duffy	Ray Kelly	
Dublin West	Kieran Dennison; **Leo Varadkar**	**Joan Burton**; Patrick Nulty	**Brian Lenihan Jnr**; David McGuinness	Paul Donnelly	**Joe Higgins** (SP)	Roderic O'Gorman	Clement Esebamen	
Dún Laoghaire	**Seán Barrett**; **Mary Mitchell O'Connor**	**Eamon Gilmore**; Ivana Bacik	Barry Andrews; Mary Hanafin		**Richard Boyd Barrett** (PBP)	Ciarán Cuffe	Victor Boyhan; Mike Deegan; Carl Haughton; Trevor Patton	Nick Crawford (NV); Daire Fitzgerald (CS)
Galway East	**Ciarán Cannon**; **Paul Connaughton Jnr**; Jimmy McClearn; Tom McHugh	**Colm Keaveney**; Lorraine Higgins	**Michael P. Kitt**; Michael F. Dolan	Dermot Connolly		Ciarán Kennedy	Tim Broderick; Seán Canney; Emer O'Donnell	
Galway West	Fidelma Healy Eames; **Seán Kyne**; Hildegarde Naughton; **Brian Walsh**	**Derek Nolan**	Michael Crowe; Frank Fahey; **Éamon Ó Cuív**	Trevor Ó Clochartaigh		Niall Ó Brolcháin	Catherine Connolly; Mike Cubbard; **Noel Grealish**; Uinseann Holmes; Thomas King; Eamon Walsh; Tom Welby	
Kerry North–West Limerick	**Jimmy Deenihan**; John Sheahan	**Arthur Spring**	Tom McEllistrim	**Martin Ferris**		Tom Donovan	Mary Fitzgibbon; Sam Locke; John McKenna; Bridget O'Brien	Mick Reidy (NV)
Kerry South	**Brendan Griffin**; Tom Sheahan	Marie Moloney	John O'Donoghue			Oonagh Comerford	Richard Behal; Dermot Finn; **Tom Fleming**; **Michael Healy-Rae**	Michael Gleeson (SKIA)
Kildare North	**Bernard Durkan**; **Anthony Lawlor**	**Emmet Stagg**; John McGinley	Áine Brady; Michael Fitzpatrick	Martin Kelly		Shane Fitzgerald	Michael Beirne; Eric Doyle-Higgins; **Catherine Murphy**; Bart Murphy	
Kildare South	**Martin Heydon**	**Jack Wall**	**Seán Ó Fearghaíl**; Seán Power	Jason Turner		Vivian Cummins	Paddy Kennedy; Clifford T. Reid	
Laois–Offaly	**Marcella Corcoran Kennedy**; **Charles Flanagan**; John Moran; Liam Quinn	John Whelan	**Barry Cowen**; **Seán Fleming**; John Moloney	**Brian Stanley**	Ray Fitzpatrick (SP)	Christopher Fettes	Rotimi Adebari; John Boland; John Bracken; Michael Cox; Liam Dumpleton; James Fanning; Eddie Fitzpatrick; John Foley; John Leahy; Fergus McDonnell	
Limerick	**Dan Neville**; **Patrick O'Donovan**; William O'Donnell	James Heffernan	**Niall Collins**			Stephen Wall	Con Cremin; John Dillon; Patrick O'Doherty; Seamus Sherlock	
Limerick City	**Michael Noonan**; **Kieran O'Donnell**	**Jan O'Sullivan**	**Willie O'Dea**; Peter Power	Maurice Quinlivan	Cian Prendiville (SP)	Sheila Cahill	Kevin Kiely; Matt Larkin; Denis Riordan	Conor O'Donoghue (CS)
Longford–Westmeath	**James Bannon**; Peter Burke; **Nicky McFadden**	**Willie Penrose**; Mae Sexton	Peter Kelly; Mary O'Rourke; **Robert Troy**	Paul Hogan		Siobhán Kinahan	John Boland; Benny Cooney; Donal Jackson; Kevin "Boxer" Moran	David D'arcy (NV)
Louth	**Peter Fitzpatrick**; **Fergus O'Dowd**	**Ged Nash**; Mary Moran	Declan Breathnach; James Carroll; **Séamus Kirk**	**Gerry Adams**		Mark Dearey	David Bradley; Gerry Crilly; Robert Glynn; Frank Godfrey; Luke Martin; Fred Matthews; Robin Wilson	Thomas Clare (NV)
Mayo	**Enda Kenny**; **Michelle Mulherin** **John O'Mahony**; **Michael Ring**	Jerry Cowley	**Dara Calleary**; Lisa Chambers	Rose Conway-Walsh; Thérèse Ruane		John Carey	Loretta Clarke; Seán Forkin; Michael Kilcoyne; Dermot McDonnell	Martin Daly (NV)
Meath East	**Regina Doherty**; **Shane McEntee**	**Dominic Hannigan**	Thomas Byrne; Nick Killian	Michael Gallagher		Seán Ó Buachalla	Joe Bonner	Sharon Keogan (NV)
Meath West	**Ray Butler**; **Damien English**; Catherine Yore	Jenny McHugh	Johnny Brady; Shane Cassells	**Peadar Tóibín**		Fiona Irwin	Stephen Ball; Ronan Carolan; Dáithí Stephens	Séamus McDonagh (WP); Manus MacMeanmain (CS)
Roscommon–South Leitrim	**Frank Feighan**; **Denis Naughten**	John Kelly	Ivan Connaughton; Gerry Kilrane	Martin Kenny		Garreth McDaid	Seán Kearns; John McDermott	**Luke 'Ming' Flanagan** (NV)
Sligo–North Leitrim	**Tony McLoughlin**; **John Perry**	Susan O'Keeffe	Marc MacSharry; Eamon Scanlon	**Michael Colreavy**	Declan Bree (Ind)	Johnny Gogan	Dick Cahill; Veronica Cawley; Michael Clarke; Gabriel McSharry	Alwyn Love (NV)
Tipperary North	**Noel Coonan**	**Alan Kelly**	Máire Hoctor	Séamus Morris		Olwyn O'Malley	Kate Bopp; **Michael Lowry**	Billy Clancy (NV)
Tipperary South	**Tom Hayes**; Michael Murphy	Phil Prendergast	Martin Mansergh	Michael Browne	**Séamus Healy** (WUA)	Paul McNally	**Mattie McGrath**	
Waterford	**Paudie Coffey**; **John Deasy**	**Ciara Conway**; Seamus Ryan	Brendan Kenneally	David Cullinane		Jody Power	Justin Collery; Joe Conway; **John Halligan**; Tom Higgins; Gerard Kiersey; Declan Waters	Ben Nutty (FN); Joe Tobin (WP)
Wexford	Michael W. D'Arcy; **Paul Kehoe**; **Liam Twomey**	Pat Cody; **Brendan Howlin**	**John Browne**; Seán Connick	Anthony Kelly	Seamus O'Brien (PBP)	Danny Forde	Ruairí de Valera; John Dwyer; Siobhán Roseingrave; **Mick Wallace**	
Wicklow	**Andrew Doyle**; **Simon Harris**; **Billy Timmins**	**Anne Ferris**; Tom Fortune; Conal Kavanagh	Pat Fitzgerald; Dick Roche	John Brady		Niall Byrne	Joe Behan; Kevin Carroll; Thomas Clarke; Peter Dempsey; **Stephen Donnelly**; Eugene Finnegan; Anthony Fitzgerald; Charlie Keddy; Nicky Kelly; Donal Kiernan; Michael Mulvihill; Jim Tallon	Pat Kavanagh (FN); Gerry Kinsella (FN)
