= History of Fine Gael =

History of Irish political party

Fine Gael (/ˌfiːnə ˈɡeɪl, ˌfɪn-/, Irish: [ˌfʲɪnʲə ˈɡeːl̪ˠ]; English: "Family (or Tribe) of the Irish") is a political party in Ireland, formed in 1933 as a merger of Cumann na nGaedheal, the National Centre Party, and the Blueshirts.

It has participated in a number of coalition governments since 1948, on all but one occasion as the lead party of government. Since 2024, it has been in a coalition government with Fianna Fáil.

== Origins ==
Historical flag of Fine Gael

In the face of intimidation of Cumann na nGaedheal meetings by the anti-treaty IRA and the rise in support for Éamon de Valera's Fianna Fáil from 1926, a new strategy was required to strengthen the voice of the pro-Treaty tradition who found themselves in opposition. The National Guard, popularly known as the Blueshirts, and originally the Army Comrades Association, a nationalist-conservative and covertly fascist movement led by Eoin O'Duffy, took up the task of defending Cumann na nGaedheal rallies from republican intimidation. When they planned a march on Dublin, de Valera banned the demonstration, fearing a repeat of Mussolini's infamous March on Rome. As a result, Fine Gael–The United Ireland Party was founded as an independent party on 8 September 1933, following a merger of Cumann na nGaedheal, the National Centre Party and the National Guard. The merger brought together two strands of Irish nationalism namely the pro-treaty wing of revolutionary Sinn Féin and the old Home Rule party represented by Dillon and the Centre Party. In reality, the new party was a larger version of Cumann na nGaedheal, the party created in 1923 by the Pro-Treaty leaders of the Irish Free State under WT Cosgrave.

The new party sought to end the Economic War, improve relations with Britain while advocating a United Ireland within the framework of the Commonwealth. After a short hiatus under the disastrous leadership of Eoin O'Duffy, Cosgrave returned to lead the new party, continuing in the leadership until 1944. During this time, the party reverted to what it had been like during the days of Cumann na nGaedheal, much to the disappointment of those who had advocated a merger on the basis of creating a better organised party machine. Although the people who formed the party had been in government for ten years in the Irish Free State (1922–32), once Fianna Fáil under Éamon de Valera came to power in 1932, Fine Gael spent the next sixteen years in the doldrums, overshadowed by the larger party. Indeed, at times, it went into what was thought to be terminal decline on the opposition benches. Cosgrave finally resigned as leader in 1944 and was replaced by General Richard Mulcahy. The party's fortunes seemed to be on the rise as Mulcahy sought to cast away the legacy of a weak party organisation that Cosgrave had bequeathed to Fine Gael. By the time the 1948 election was called, a number of first time candidates had been selected, with four of these subsequently elected as TDs.

== Inter-party governments ==
When the votes were counted in the 1948 general election, Fine Gael had 31 seats. While not disastrous given the number of young candidates returned and that the purely party vote had been retained despite the loss of key personalities, it was still a result that showed little promise for the future. However, Fianna Fáil had not won an overall majority. Nevertheless, it appeared that no other party could possibly form a government, as Fianna Fáil still had 30 more seats than Fine Gael.

The situation changed when the anti-Fianna Fáil parties realised that if they banded together, they had only one seat fewer than Fianna Fáil, and would be able to take power with the support of at least seven independents. However, some of the other parties in the prospective coalition considered Mulcahy, to be too controversial a potential Taoiseach.

Notably, Clann na Poblachta (under former anti-Treaty IRA chief of staff, Seán MacBride), were opposed to him because of his role as Chief of Staff of the Irish Army in the execution of republicans during the Irish Civil War. Mulcahy selflessly stepped aside and former Attorney-General John A. Costello was chosen to head the First Inter-Party Government, which lasted from 1948 to 1951. Costello was an effective chairman of a coalition comprising many different shades of opinion. That Government is remembered for establishing the Industrial Development Authority and the formal declaration of a republic in 1949. Also a record number of houses were built, improvements were made in the tourism industry and the health minister Noel Browne successfully tackled the tuberculosis disease. Costello also headed the Second Inter-Party Government, which had a much stronger Fine Gael representation, from 1954 to 1957. Fine Gael's Foreign Minister Liam Cosgrave negotiated Ireland's entry to the United Nations in 1955 and, in doing so, defined Irish foreign policy for decades.

The party's Health Minister Tom O'Higgins introduced the Voluntary Health Insurance Board (VHI) and thus established Ireland's partly insurance-based health service that persists today. Fianna Fáil and de Valera were returned to power in 1957, banishing Fine Gael once more to the opposition benches.

Costello's Government, although it decided against the re-introduction of internment, responded to the activities of Saor Uladh and the mainstream IRA by stepping up security measures against these groups, leading to the arrest of prominent republicans. In response to this and to a rapid deterioration in the state of the economy, Clann na Poblachta withdrew its support and Costello was left with no choice other than to call an election.

== The Just Society and Tom O'Higgins ==
Out of government, Fine Gael again went into decline. In the mid-1960s, however, it launched a new policy statement, known as The Just Society, advocating policies based on principles of social justice and equality. That document was the brainchild of Declan Costello, a Fine Gael TD and son of former Taoiseach John A. Costello, and reflected an emerging faction in the party that was being influenced by Social Democracy. This new strand of thinking in Fine Gael paved the way for the rise within the party of liberal thinkers such as Garret FitzGerald. Party leaders of the time remained conservative but the seeds of the 1980s revolution had been sown. In 1966, Fine Gael's young presidential candidate, Tom O'Higgins, came within 1% of defeating the sitting president, Éamon de Valera, in that year's presidential election. This was regarded as a substantial achievement as Fianna Fáil had persuaded RTÉ to provide no coverage of the campaign and the election was held in the year of the 50th anniversary of the Easter Rising in which de Valera had played a prominent role. O'Higgins came from the emerging social democratic wing of the party.

When James Dillon resigned as Fine Gael leader in 1965, Liam Cosgrave, son of Cumann na nGaedheal founder W. T. Cosgrave, was selected to succeed him. The swift changeover was viewed as a means of keeping control of the party away from the emerging centre-left wing. However, the party's two factions continued to feud. With events in Northern Ireland spiralling out of control, Liam Cosgrave sought to focus Fine Gael minds on its role as protector of the state's institutions. At the Fine gael Ard Fheis in May 1972, the 50th anniversary of the foundation of the state, Cosgrave rounded on his enemies. He ridiculed liberals in the party who were distracting his efforts to bring about a settlement in the North. His speech memorably likened his critics to "mongrel foxes" that had gone to ground. In the wake of the Fianna Fáil Arms Crisis and Cosgrave's strong performances in opposition in defending the institutions of the State, the party was well-positioned to return to Government with the Labour Party (which had altered its 1960s anti-coalition stance).

== National Coalition ==
After a break of sixteen years, Fine Gael returned to government in 1973, at the head of a National Coalition government with Labour, under Cosgrave's leadership, on the basis of a pre-election agreement between the two parties and active encouragement of each party's supporters to record preferences for the other party's candidates. That government has generally been regarded as a well-meaning government containing much political talent, but was hit by frequent problems. Some of these were outside its control (for example the 1970s oil crisis and escalating violence in Northern Ireland), while others were its own direct creation notably the public criticism of President Cearbhall Ó Dálaigh, by Minister for Defence, Patrick Donegan, in which he referred to the president as a "thundering disgrace". (Some witnesses to the speech recall the Minister as having employed a more forceful and colloquial adjective than "thundering.") Ó Dálaigh's subsequent resignation in 1976, in response to Cosgrave's refusal to discipline his unruly subordinate, severely damaged the National Coalition's reputation.

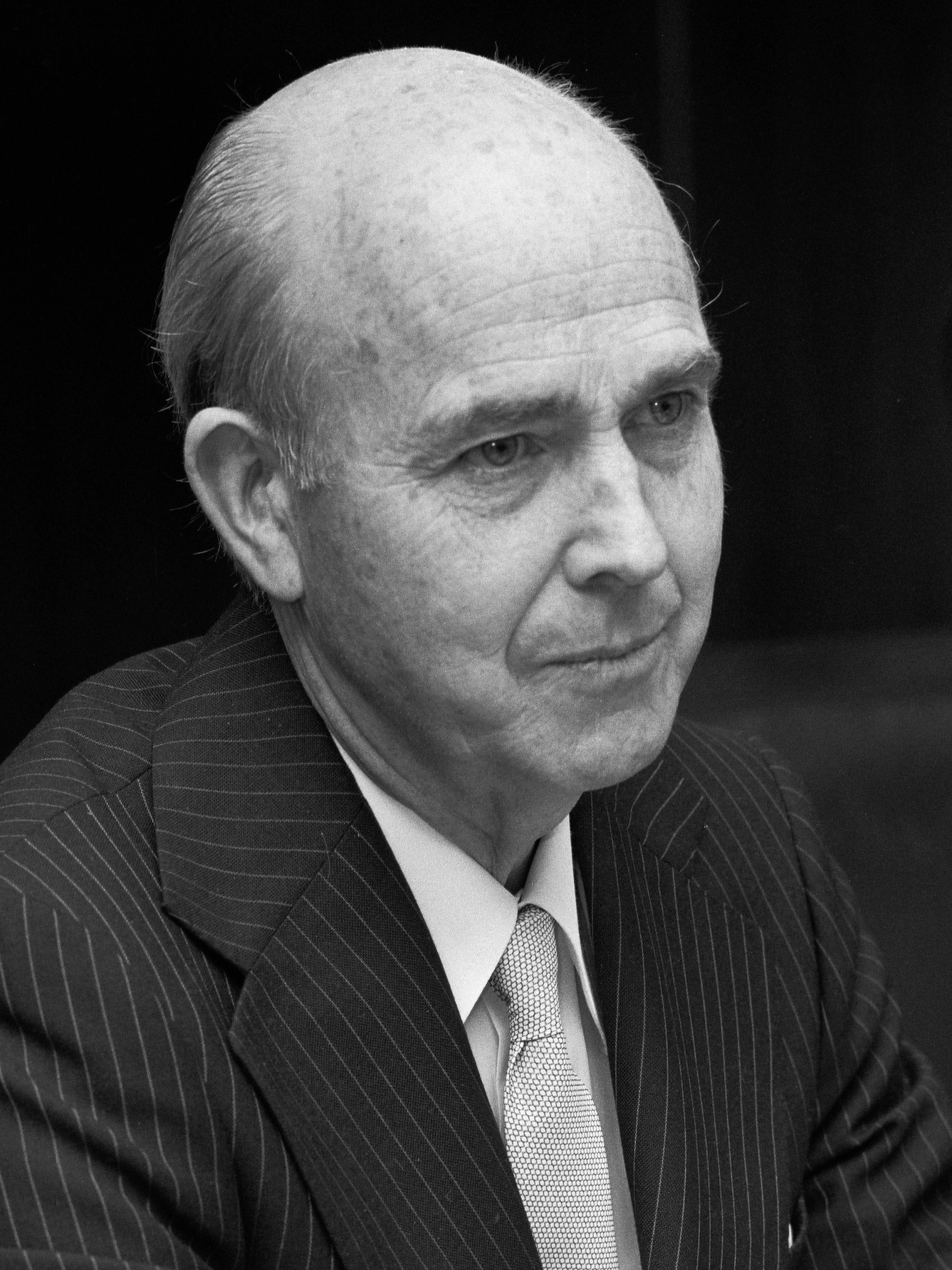
President Cearbhall Ó Dálaigh, who resigned following a clash with a Fine Gael minister

Cosgrave, like his father before him, showed a fierce determination to defend the institutions of state and would not compromise with extremists, instead working towards reconciliation. The National Coalition is noted for its attempts to build a power-sharing executive in Northern Ireland through the Sunningdale Agreement. The Sunningdale Agreement collapsed after a loyalist general strike. However, it left a legacy of compromise that would lead to later Agreements aimed at bringing peace to the troubled region. The government's record in the area of civil liberties is more mixed, with allegations that an official blind eye was turned to the abuse in custody of republican suspects by a so-called "Heavy Gang" within the Garda Síochána, or police force. It was the Coalition's failure to address the economic problems of the day, however, with inflation, unemployment and national indebtedness all running at record levels, that led to its ultimate repudiation by the voters. In 1977 the Fine Gael/Labour government suffered a heavy defeat, with Fianna Fáil winning an unprecedented 20-seat majority in the 148-seat Dáil, a landslide under proportional representation.

== Garret FitzGerald ==
Cosgrave resigned the leadership and was replaced by Garret FitzGerald. FitzGerald had been a successful Minister for Foreign Affairs in the National Coalition, his affable style and liberal views doing much to change the stereotypical European view of Ireland (and perhaps Ireland's of itself). FitzGerald was one of Ireland's most popular politicians and son of Desmond FitzGerald, a Cumann na nGaedheal Minister for External Affairs. He moved Fine Gael leftwards to the centre ground and promoted the so-called Liberal Agenda. He also founded the autonomous youth movement Young Fine Gael, while the party attracted thousands of new members. Fine Gael seemed trendy under FitzGerald's leadership (for instance, U2 endorsed them at this time). Fine Gael's revitalisation was on such a scale that by the November 1982 general election, Fine Gael was only five seats behind Fianna Fáil in Dáil Éireann and bigger than its rival in the Oireachtas as a whole (i.e. counting the number of representatives in both houses of parliament). As Taoiseach, FitzGerald attempted to create a more pluralist Republic. In 1985 after lengthy negotiations he succeeded in negotiating the Anglo-Irish Agreement. This gave the Republic a say in the affairs of Northern Ireland while improving the Anglo-Irish relationship. Nevertheless, Fine Gael under Fitzgerald failed to control spiralling emigration and unemployment, though the intransigence of Labour leader Dick Spring with regard to taxation and public spending did not help. FitzGerald led two governments: 1981 to February 1982, and December 1982 to 1987. In January 1987, Labour withdrew from the previous coalition as tensions had developed between the coalition partners over how to tackle the economy. In 1987 the party was defeated heavily in the general election of that year. FitzGerald resigned and his close ally and former Minister for Finance Alan Dukes replaced him, but continued to lead the party in the same socially democratic vein.

== Leadership of John Bruton (1990-2001) ==
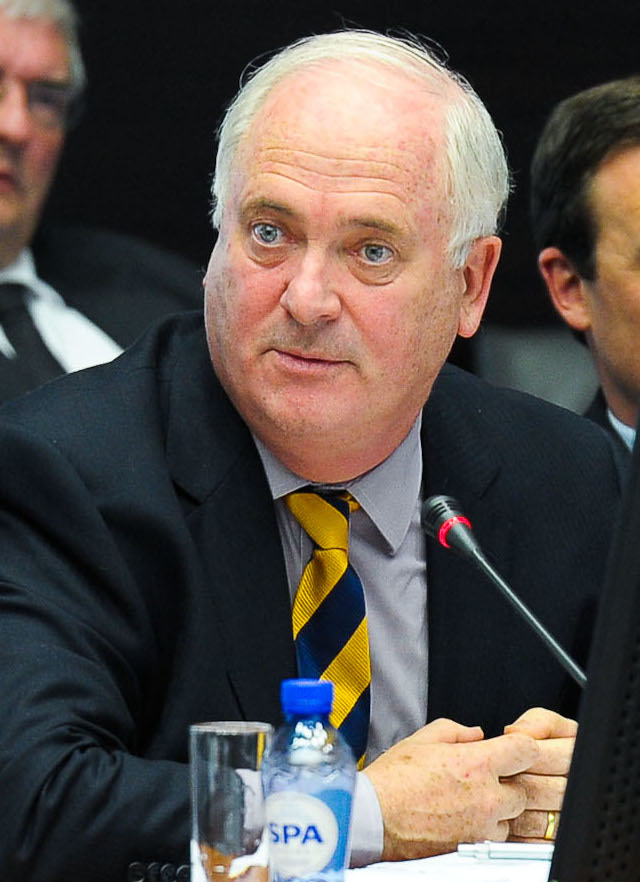
Bruton in 2011

=== Electoral history in the 80's and 90's ===
From a highpoint in the 1980s, Fine Gael went into slight, then sharp decline. Despite Dukes launching the Tallaght Strategy in 1987, the party gained just four seats in the following general election. In 1990, its candidate in the Irish presidential election, Austin Currie, was pushed into a humiliating third place, behind the winner, Labour's Mary Robinson and Fianna Fáil's Brian Lenihan. This led to John Bruton replacing Alan Dukes as the party's leader.

=== Party in Opposition ===
In 1989, political history was made when Fianna Fáil abandoned one of its "core principles", its opposition to coalition. Having failed in 1987 and 1989 to win outright majorities, Fianna Fáil entered into a coalition administration with the Progressive Democrats. Commentators predicted that that would leave Fine Gael isolated, with Fianna Fáil able to swap coalition partners to keep itself continuously in power. This was also precipitated by the fact that now, under its new pact with the Progressive Democrats, Fianna Fáil would now be able to, though remaining quite ideologically populist, dominate the fiscally conservative, right of centre vacuum previously dominated by Fine Gael. The rise of the Progressive Democrats diminished Fine Gael's chances of continuing to promote the Fitzgerald-ite liberal agenda alongside its more traditional, right wing economic conservatism. This phenomenon indeed became even more apparent when, after the 1992 general election, Fianna Fáil replaced the Progressive Democrats with the Labour Party in coalition.

=== Coalition government ===
However the Fianna Fáil-Labour coalition disintegrated in 1994, allowing Bruton to emerge as Taoiseach of a three-party Rainbow Coalition, involving Fine Gael, Labour and Democratic Left. This was in spite of a pre-election promise in 1992 from Bruton that Fine Gael would not enter government with the Democratic Left, a party which had links to militant Irish republicanism, as well as being left leaning in its outlook.

=== Divorce referendum ===
The government called a referendum on divorce which was carried by a narrow majority. John Bruton gained respect for his leadership during the campaign. The Government also oversaw the first period of unprecedented economic growth, job creation on a massive scale and Ireland's first budget surplus in over twenty five years. The Irish economy continued to thrive under Fine Gael and Labour with the introduction of the 12.5% rate of corporation tax and a modest cut in income tax.

=== 1997 general election, return to opposition ===
However, the Provisional IRA ceasefire ended in 1996, stalling the peace process. Many nationalists blamed the approach taken by Taoiseach John Bruton for this setback. The three parties worked well together and fought the 1997 election on a united platform. At the 1997 general election, Fine Gael won 54 seats, a gain of 9 seats. However, the Labour Party suffered considerable losses, falling from 32 seats to 17, while Democratic Left also lost two seats. This left Bruton far short of the parliamentary support he needed to retain office. A Fianna Fáil–Progressive Democrat coalition led by Bertie Ahern entered office, with Bruton reverting to leadership of the opposition.

== Leadership of Michael Noonan (2001–2002) ==
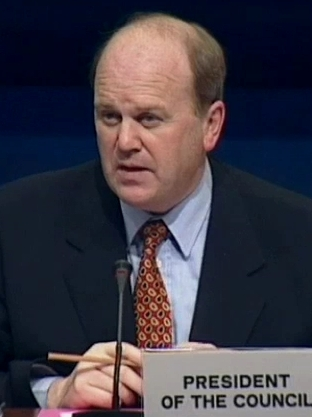
Michael Noonan in 1996

=== Ousting of Bruton, election as leader ===
Despite increasing their seats to 54, Fine Gael returned to opposition and Noonan became Opposition Spokesman for Finance following the 1997 general election. In 2001, following a series of disastrous opinion polls, Noonan and his colleague, Jim Mitchell, tabled a motion of no confidence in the leader, John Bruton. The motion was successful in ousting Bruton as leader, with Noonan becoming leader of Fine Gael and Leader of the Opposition with Mitchell becoming deputy leader. Noonan avoided requests to be interviewed on TV and radio programmes, including some on RTÉ and Today FM, ahead of the leadership election.

=== 2002 general election, resignation as leader ===
At the 2002 general election, Fine Gael had a disastrous result, dropping from 54 seats to 31 and a number of high-profile front bench member losses, including Alan Dukes, Deirdre Clune, Alan Shatter and deputy leader Jim Mitchell. Noonan resigned as Fine Gael leader on the night of the election.

== Leadership of Enda Kenny (2002–2017) ==
=== Electoral history from 2004–2009 ===
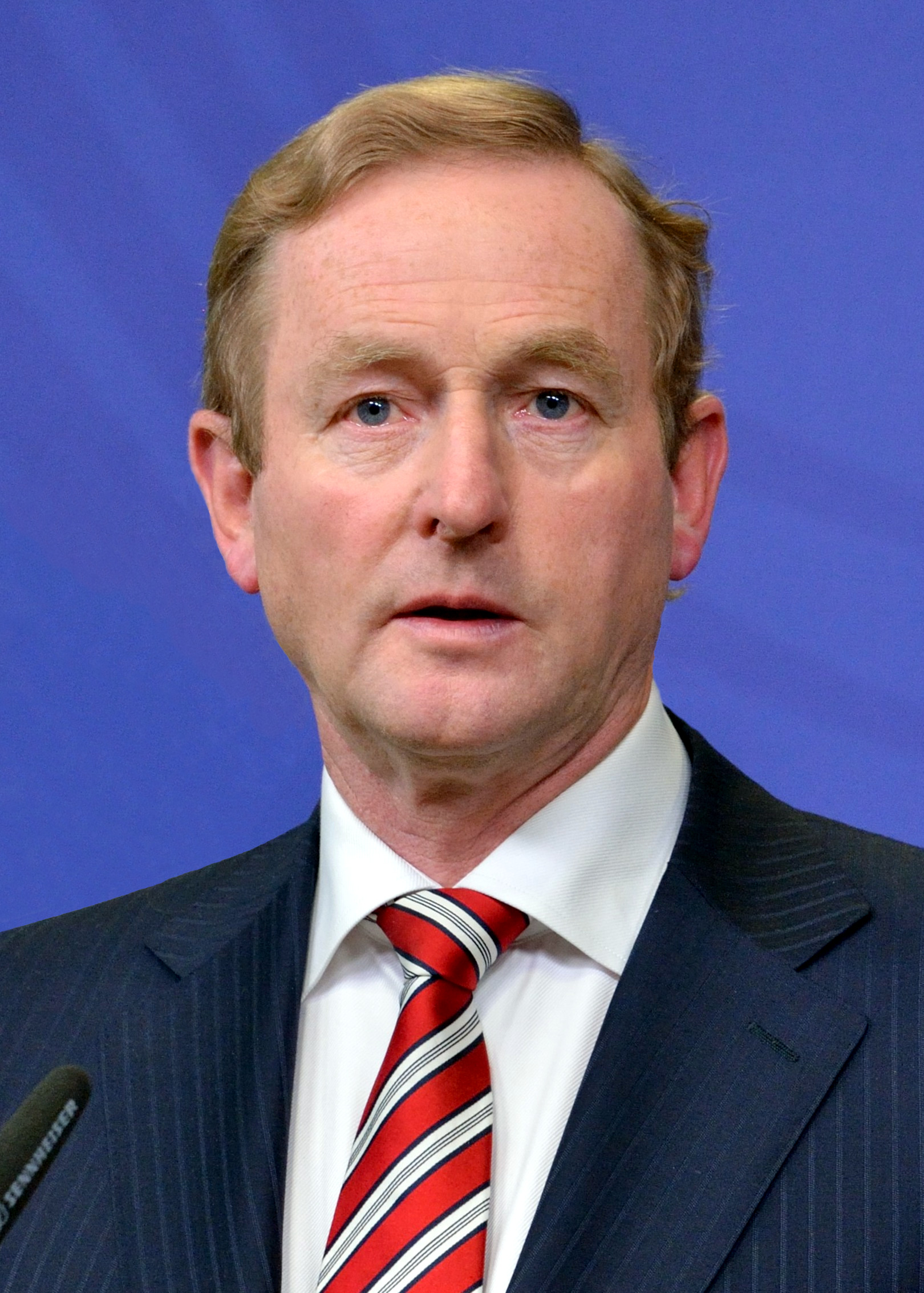
Enda Kenny in 2012

Under its new leader, Enda Kenny, Fine Gael staged a recovery in local and European elections held on 11 June 2004, becoming the largest Irish party in the European Parliament by winning five seats (compared to just four seats for the ruling Fianna Fáil party), while it came within nine seats of becoming the largest party in local government. The recovery for Fine Gael was complete when it gained 20 seats at the 2007 general election. The party entered into an electoral alliance with the Labour Party in Mullingar during 2005, the "Alliance For Change". This election, however, did not bring Fine Gael back into power. In the local elections of 2009, Fine Gael surpassed Fiannna Fáil, gaining over 40 seats and bringing the total up to 340 compared to Fianna Fáil's 180. At European level, Fine Gael was the largest party and won the Dublin South by-election with George Lee sweeping to victory with over 54% of the vote and just missing out on a seat in Dublin Central with Paschal Donohoe, although Lee later resigned from his position after only nine months due to having "virtually no influence or input" into shaping Fine Gael's economic policies.

=== Rise in opinion polls ===
In 2010, opinion polls had Labour ahead of Fine Gael with Fianna Fáil's collapse in the votes not transferring to Fine Gael. Deputy Leader Richard Bruton along with nine of the Fine Gael Front Bench challenged Enda Kenny for the leadership. In a bitter battle, Enda Kenny won the confidence vote of the party and set about healing the wounds. He reappointed Richard Bruton to the Front Bench along with bringing Michael Noonan back into the Front Bench as Spokesman on Finance. The arrival of the IMF to bail out the country's finances in November of that year saw Fianna Fáil implode.

=== 2011 general election, Government formation ===
Fine Gael, with strong performances from Noonan and his team of deputies, saw Fine Gael support rise heading into the general election which was called in February 2011. Many believed Enda Kenny had a terrific campaign and the question was now whether Fine Gael could get an overall majority. When the votes were counted Fine Gael fell short with an historic seat total of 76 seats and 36.1% of the vote, becoming the largest party in the Dáil for the first time. The Fianna Fáil vote collapsed to 17.4% and 20 seats in the Dáil, compared to 41.6% and 77 seats at the previous general election. A new government was formed with the Labour Party under the leadership of Enda Kenny as Taoiseach. He had led the party from the abyss to the greatest victory in their history and now had the largest party in the state.

=== 2013 party expulsion crisis ===
In July 2013 five TDs (Lucinda Creighton, Terence Flanagan, Peter Mathews, Billy Timmins and Brian Walsh) and two senators (Paul Bradford and Fidelma Healy Eames) were expelled from the Fine Gael parliamentary party for opposing the Fine Gael–Labour Party coalition's Protection of Life During Pregnancy Act 2013. In September 2013 they founded the Reform Alliance along with Denis Naughten, another Fine Gael TD who had been expelled for opposing the 2011 budget's downgrade of Roscommon County Hospital. Brian Walsh declined to join the bloc. Creighton had the highest profile of the founders, having been Minister of State for European Affairs prior to her expulsion. She denied being the leader of the new group.

=== 2016 general election, return to government ===
On 3 February 2016, Kenny announced his intention to request that President Higgins dissolve the 31st Dáil. He told the Dáil before its dissolution that the 2016 general election would occur on Friday, 26 February.

Fine Gael won 50 seats in the 32nd Dáil, 29 short of an overall majority. Preliminary discussions took place with Leader of the Opposition Micheál Martin, in order to agree on an arrangement to support either Kenny, Fine Gael or under a new leader to form a new government. On 10 March 2016, Kenny resigned as Taoiseach, after failing to win enough votes to be elected for a second term. He and the cabinet continued in a caretaker capacity until a new government was formed.

On 29 April 2016, an agreement was reached with Fianna Fáil to allow a Fine Gael–led minority government, and on 6 May 2016, Kenny was elected Taoiseach again, by a margin of 59 to 49 votes (with 51 abstentions), and formed a government. He became the first member of Fine Gael to win re-election as Taoiseach in the party's history. Kenny also took over as Minister for Defence, from Simon Coveney, who was appointed Minister for Housing, Planning, Community and Local Government.

=== Resignation as party leader, 2017 leadership election ===
On 17 May 2017, Kenny announced his intention to step down as party leader, effective at midnight. He requested that the party conclude the election of his successor by 2 June 2017, and said that he would step down as Taoiseach shortly thereafter. In the ensuing election, Minister for Social Protection Leo Varadkar was elected Leader of Fine Gael. In a statement, Kenny offered his "heartiest congratulations" to Varadkar, saying "this is a tremendous honour for him and I know he will devote his life to improving the lives of people across our country".

On 13 June 2017, Kenny tendered his resignation as Taoiseach. The following day, 14 June 2017, he nominated Varadkar to formally succeed him as Taoiseach in the Dáil; the Dáil approved the nomination. Kenny then made his farewell address to the Dáil, quoting U.S. President Theodore Roosevelt: "Far and away, the best prize that life has to offer is a chance to work hard at work worth doing." After receiving a standing ovation from the Dáil, Kenny departed for Áras an Uachtaráin and submitted his resignation to President Michael D. Higgins. In his last duty as Taoiseach he advised the President that the Dáil had nominated Varadkar as Taoiseach, and that the President should thus invite him to form a new government and appoint him as Taoiseach in accordance with the constitution.

== Leadership of Leo Varadkar (2017–2024) ==
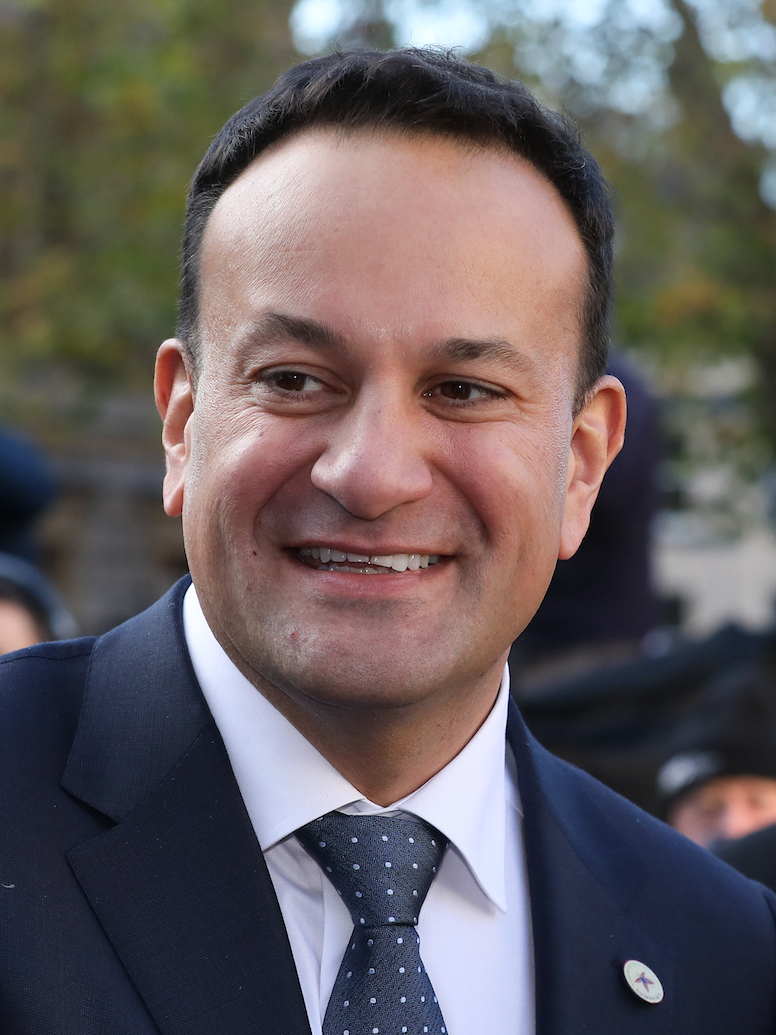
Leo Varadkar in 2022

=== Election as leader, appointment as Taoiseach ===
On 2 June 2017, Varadkar was elected leader of Fine Gael, defeating Simon Coveney. Although Coveney had the support of more Fine Gael members than Varadkar, the electoral college system more strongly weighted the votes of the party's parliamentarians, with these strongly backing Varadkar.

=== Approval rating ===
In January 2018, his opinion poll approval ratings reached 60%, a ten-year high for any Taoiseach.

=== 2018 Abortion referendum ===
In January 2018, he announced that the referendum to repeal Ireland's 8th Amendment which prevented any liberalisation of restrictive abortion laws would take place in May. If passed, it would allow the government to introduce new legislation. It was proposed that women would be allowed unrestricted access to abortion up until 12 weeks, with exceptions if the mother's life is in danger up until six months. Varadkar said he would campaign for liberalising the laws, saying his mind was changed by difficult cases during his tenure as Minister for Health. The referendum passed with 66% of the votes.

=== 2020 general election ===
On 14 January 2020, Varadkar sought a dissolution of the 32nd Dáil, which was granted by President Michael D. Higgins, and scheduled a general election for 8 February. In that election, Varadkar was re-elected in the Dublin West constituency, but Fine Gael fell to 35 seats, 15 fewer than in 2016, and falling to third place behind Fianna Fáil (38 seats) and Sinn Féin (37 seats). Varadkar ruled out any possibility of a Fine Gael–Sinn Féin coalition during the election campaign, though a "grand coalition" of Fianna Fáil and Fine Gael was floated as a final possibility. However, on 12 February, Varadkar conceded that Fine Gael had lost the election and that he was very likely to become the next Opposition Leader. Varadkar added that Fine Gael was "willing to step back" to allow Sinn Féin, as the winner of the popular vote, to have the first opportunity to form a government. On 20 February, Varadkar offered his resignation to President Higgins at Áras an Uachtaráin, pursuant to the constitution, remaining, however, as Taoiseach until the formation of a new government.

=== COVID-19 pandemic ===
The first case of COVID-19 was discovered in Ireland on 29 February 2020. While in Washington, D.C., ahead of Saint Patrick's Day, Varadkar announced measures intended to stop COVID-19 spreading, including the closure of all schools, universities and childcare facilities from the following day, as well as the closure of all cultural institutions and the cancellation of "all indoor mass gatherings of more than 100 people and outdoor mass gatherings of more than 500 people". After returning home early, Varadkar addressed the nation on Saint Patrick's night during A Ministerial Broadcast by An Taoiseach Leo Varadkar, TD, introducing television viewers to the concept of "cocooning", i.e. "At a certain point… we will advise the elderly and people who have a long-term illness to stay at home for several weeks". The speech was the most watched television event in Irish history, surpassing the previous record held by The Late Late Toy Show by an additional total of about 25% and was widely distributed globally. It was also plagiarised by Irish businessman Peter Bellew, the chief operating officer at British low-cost airline group EasyJet.

In response to a March 2020 Health Service Executive appeal to healthcare professionals, Varadkar rejoined the medical register and offered to work as a doctor one day each week.

=== 2020 government formation ===
On 14 April, Fianna Fáil and Fine Gael reached a coalition agreement, which includes a rotation for Taoiseach. However, they lacked a majority and needed to bring other parties or independents into the coalition in order to form a government. The Greens required an annual 7% cut to carbon emissions, among other demands, to participate as the third party of government; these demands did not include Green leader Eamon Ryan participating in the taoiseach rotation scheme, despite rumours to the contrary. The Social Democrats, Aontú, and technical groups of independents also expressed varying degrees of interest in entering into government formation negotiations with Fianna Fáil and Fine Gael.

A draft programme for government was agreed between Fianna Fáil, Fine Gael, and the Green Party on 15 June 2020. It was determined that the position of Taoiseach would rotate between Micheál Martin and Leo Varadkar. The programme needed the approval by each party's membership. Fianna Fáil and the Green Party require a simple majority and a 67% majority, respectively, in a postal ballot of all members, while Fine Gael uses an electoral college system, with its parliamentary party making up 50% of the electorate, constituency delegates 25%, councillors 15% and the party's executive council filling the final 10%.

On 26 June, Fine Gael voted 80%, Fianna Fáil voted 74% and the Green Party voted 76% in favour of the programme. Clare Bailey, the leader of the Green Party in Northern Ireland – a branch of the Irish Green Party – publicly rejected the idea of the Greens being part of the coalition deal with Fianna Fáil and Fine Gael. She said the coalition deal proposed the "most fiscally conservative arrangements in a generation". The coalition deal allowed for a government to be formed on 27 June, with Fianna Fáil leader Micheál Martin serving as Taoiseach until December 2022. Subsequently, the Dáil voted on 27 June to nominate Micheál Martin as Taoiseach. He was appointed afterward by President Michael D. Higgins and announced his cabinet later that day.

=== Coalition government ===
In October 2020, Village magazine published a claim that Leo Varadkar had provided a copy of a confidential document to the head of the National Association of General Practitioners that had been part of negotiations with the Irish Medical Organisation in April 2019 while Taoiseach. Fine Gael issued a statement which described the article as "both inaccurate and grossly defamatory", and while accepting that the provision of the agreement by private channels was "not best practice", said there was nothing unlawful about what had occurred. Sinn Féin tabled a motion of no confidence in the Tánaiste. In response, the Taoiseach moved a motion of confidence.

At a cabinet meeting in July 2021, Minister for Foreign Affairs Simon Coveney announced the appointment of Katherine Zappone, former Minister for Children and Youth Affairs, to the newly created position of Special Envoy to the UN for Freedom of Opinion and Expression. It emerged that the proposed appointment had not been flagged by Coveney with the Taoiseach in advance of the meeting. Zappone declined the appointment after the Merrion Hotel controversy arose, in which the Irish Independent reported that six days prior to the announcement of her appointment, Zappone had hosted a gathering for 50 guests, including Tánaiste Leo Varadkar, at the Merrion Hotel while the COVID-19 pandemic was ongoing. Comparisons were made between the gathering and the Golfgate scandal earlier in the pandemic. Sinn Féin tabled a motion of no confidence in Coveney, to be debated on 15 September on the return of the Dáil from the summer recess. In response, the Taoiseach moved a motion of confidence.

On 6 July 2022, the government lost its majority after Fine Gael TD Joe McHugh voted against legislation underpinning a €2.7 billion mica redress scheme and subsequently resigned the Fine Gael party whip. Sinn Féin tabled a motion of no confidence in the government, to be debated on 12 July before the summer recess. In response, the Taoiseach moved a motion of confidence.

Micheál Martin resigned as Taoiseach on Saturday 17 December 2022 to allow the appointment of Leo Varadkar as Taoiseach and the formation of a new government, a continuation of the coalition between Fianna Fáil, Fine Gael and the Green Party for the remainder of the 33rd Dáil. The date agreed in the Programme for Government had been Thursday 15 December, but this date was put back to facilitate Martin's attendance at a meeting of the European Council.

== Leadership of Simon Harris (2024–present) ==
=== Resignation of Varadkar, leadership election ===
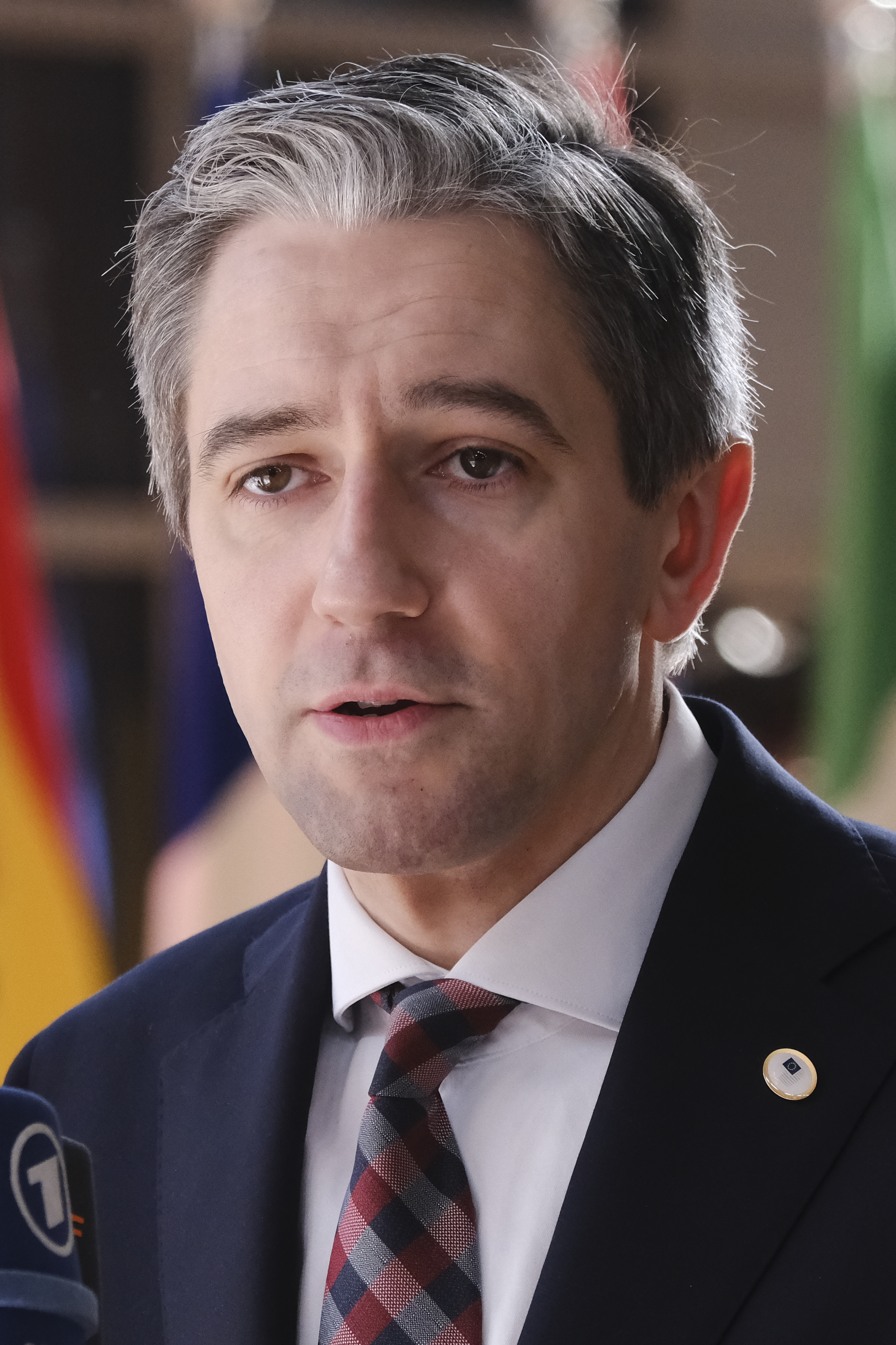
Simon Harris in 2024

On 20 March 2024, Varadkar resigned as leader. In his resignation speech, Varadkar stated that the reasons for his stepping down were "both personal and political" and that he was no longer the "best person for the job". On 24 March, following an uncontested leadership election, Simon Harris succeeded him as leader. On 9 April 2024, Harris was appointed as Taoiseach, the youngest in the history of the state.
