= Kilroy =

Kilroy may refer to:

- Kilroy (surname)
- Kilroy (TV series), a BBC day time chat show hosted by Robert Kilroy-Silk
- Kilroy, a main character in the television series Taken
- Kilroy's College, a distance education school in Ireland
- Kilroy International A/S, a European company specializing in travel-related youth products

== See also ==
- Kilroy was here
- Gilroy (disambiguation)
