= Gilroy (surname) =

Gilroy is a surname that appeared in Irish as Mac Giolla Rua, which means "son of the red-haired youth". The name Gilroy has seen many modifications since it was first devised.

The surname Gilroy was first found in County Clare (Irish: An Clár), on the west coast of Ireland, in the province of Munster. It was that of the chiefs of Clonderlaw, conjecturally descended from Tiobraid, son of Iral Glunmhar, King of Ulster.

The scribes and church officials of the Middle Ages who recorded names in official documents spelled the names as they sounded. That led to the problem of one name being recorded under several different variations and thus resembling more than one person. Among the many spelling variations of the surname that are preserved in archival documents of the era include Gilroy, Kilroy, MacGilroy, MacElroy, MacGreevy, Greevy, MacGilrea, McGilroy, McElroy, McGreevy, McGilrea, MacIlrea, McIlrea, MacIlroy, Magilroy, Magilrea, MacElry, McElry, MacIlree.

Here are notable people with the surname:

- Bert Gilroy (1899–1973), American film producer
- Beryl Gilroy (1924–2001), British novelist and teacher
- Craig Gilroy (born 1991) Irish rugby union player
- Dan Gilroy (born 1959), American film director and screenwriter
- E. A. Gilroy (Edward Albert Gilroy; 1879–1942), Canadian ice hockey administrator
- Frank D. Gilroy (1925–2015), American playwright, screenwriter, film producer and director
- Freddie Gilroy (1936–2016), Northern Irish Olympic boxer
- Henry Gilroy, American television screenwriter and producer
- Henry Gilroy (baseball), (1852–1907) Major League Baseball catcher
- Jackie Gilroy (1942–2007), former Gaelic footballer
- John Gilroy (disambiguation)

- John Gilroy (artist) (1898–1985), English illustrator known for Guinness advertisements
- John Gilroy (baseball) (1875–1897), baseball player
- John Gilroy (film editor) (born 1959), brother of Tony Gilroy
- John Gilroy (politician) (born 1967), Irish Labour Party Senator
- John Brodie Gilroy (1818–1853), English songwriter
- Johnny Gilroy (1896–1952), American football halfback

- Keith Gilroy (born 1983), Irish former professional footballer
- Linda Gilroy (born 1949), British Labour Co-operative politician
- Matt Gilroy (born 1984), American professional ice hockey defenseman
- Norman Thomas Gilroy (1896–1977), Australian Roman Catholic cardinal
- Pat Gilroy (born 1971), former Gaelic footballer and manager
- Paul Gilroy (born 1956), English academician
- Sue Anne Gilroy (born 1948), American politician, Secretary of State of Indiana
- Thomas F. Gilroy (1840–1911), American politician, 89th mayor of New York City
- Tom Gilroy, American writer, director, producer, and actor
- Tony Gilroy (born 1956), American screenwriter and filmmaker

== Fictional characters ==
- Alec Gilroy, fictional character from the British soap opera Coronation Street
- Bet Gilroy, fictional character from the British soap opera Coronation Street; wife of Alec
- Clancy Gilroy, fictional main character from the American animated show The Midnight Gospel
- Jerry Gilroy, fictional character from the Hardy Boys books; outfielder for Bayport High School
