= John Gilroy =

John Gilroy may refer to:

- John Gilroy (artist) (1898–1985), English artist/illustrator known for Guinness advertisements
- John Gilroy (baseball) (1875–1897), baseball player
- John Gilroy (film editor) (born 1959), brother of Tony Gilroy
- John Gilroy (politician) (born 1967), Irish Labour Party Senator
- John Brodie Gilroy (1818–1853), English songwriter
- Johnny Gilroy (1896–1952), American football halfback
- John Gilroy (pioneer), 19th century Royal Navy sailor who was the namesake of the city of Gilroy, California
