= Gilroy =

Gilroy may refer to:

- Gilroy (surname)
- Gilroy, California, United States
  - Gilroy station, commuter rail station
- Gilroy College, college in New South Wales, Australia

== See also ==
- Kilroy (disambiguation)
