= S. H. Benson =

British advertising company founded in 1893 by S. H. Benson

- Industry: advertising agency
- Founded: 1893
- Founder: Samuel Herbert Benson
- Headquarters: London

S. H. Benson Ltd was a British advertising company founded in 1893 by Samuel Herbert Benson. Clients of the company included Bovril, Guinness and Colmans. S. H. Benson was born on 14 August 1854 in Marylebone.

== Naval service ==
S H Benson served on the staff of Commodore Sir W N W Hewett VC, KCB in HMS Active during the Anglo-Ashanti wars. In 1875, he commanded the first cutter of that ship in an expedition up the Congo to punish pirates of that river who had looted the cargo of a vessel and murdered some of her crew. For these services he was mentioned in despatches. In the following year he took part in the blockade of the coast of Dahomey, and in 1878 he was on the staff of the later John Edmund Commerell VC and was on board HMS Agincourt when that ship leading the lee line of Sir Geoffrey Hornby's fleet proceeded through the Dardanelles on the approach of the Russians to Constantinople.

After a peaceful spell with Admiral William Dowell at Cork he again joined Commodore Hewett in the first Egyptian campaign (1882) and on the occupation of Suez by the Naval Brigade he was placed in charge of the commissariat arrangements and was again mentioned in despatches, receiving the Egypt Medal and the Khedive's Star (Bronze).

He was only 29 when he was invalided home and after acting as secretary to various committees at the Admiralty, left the Navy altogether, never having completely recovered from the effects of the rigorous Egyptian climate.

== Post Navy ==
In 1885, he started, under the patronage of Lord Randolph Churchill, the Express Couriers Corps, which was the first boy messenger venture ever organized in London. It was quashed by the GPO who considered it a breach of their monopoly.

From managing the Normal Company's factory in Aberdeen he moved to the Bovril factory in London and ultimately set out on his own account in the advertising business in September 1893.

== The company ==
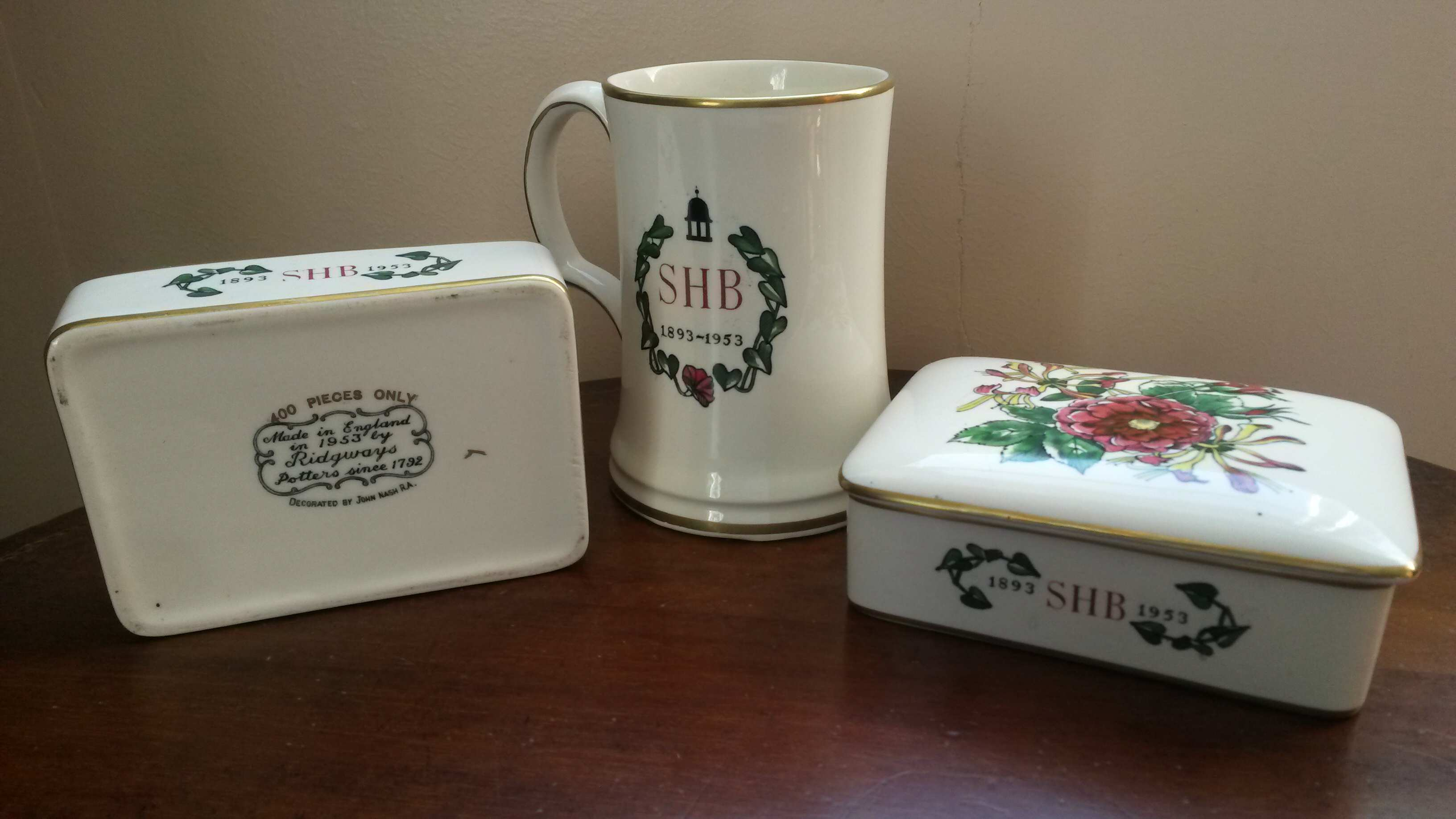
Commemorative china manufactured to celebrate the 60th anniversary of the founding of S. H. Benson Ltd. in 1953.

1893-1914 After having managed the Bovril factory for 3 years, Benson set himself up as an advertising agent at the suggestion of the Bovril chairman. S H Benson was quick to realise there was room for the development of a more professional business than just buying and selling space. Rather than competing with other houses as to who could buy and sell space on the lowest commissions, he charged a reasonable price and offered the advertiser service and advice in the conduct of his campaign. His business grew and the agency's reputation was quickly made with a striking campaign for Bovril.

The first display advertisement ever set across two columns in a London daily paper was S H Benson's idea; he was also the first to insert a double-page advertisement in the Daily Telegraph. He also had the idea to decorate all the London omnibuses with cocoa pods and every lady passenger was presented with a sample of the cocoa.

Over the next 10 years he acquired many other accounts and moved to larger premises in 1899. S H Benson Ltd registered as a limited liability company in 1906, the first advertising company to do so. In 1909 Bensons moved to Kingsway Hall, the first office building in the newly built Kingsway.

1914 onwards In 1914 the company was taken over by the founder's son, Philip who had visited America to study new methods of psychological marketing and scientific advertising. However, Philip did not take to the scientific approach and he maintained something of a bohemian atmosphere producing copy that was humorous, clever and elegant. One of S. H. Benson's copy writers in the 1920s was Dorothy Sayers, the crime writer.

In the 1920s and 1930s, S. H. Benson Ltd was the leading advertising agency with long-running campaigns for Guinness, Maclean's, Andrew's Liver Salts, Rowntrees chocolate, Lipton's Tea tea and Colman's Mustard. It specialized in large poster campaigns but undertook all types of advertising. One of the most famous campaigns was its 1926 effort for Colman's Mustard and the firm's greatest success came in 1928 with the first advertising campaign for Guinness.

The Guinness Account In 65 years of advertising, only 5 agencies have ever held the Guinness account – S H Benson, J Walter Thompson, Allen Brady and Marsh, Ogilvy & Mather and currently Abbott Mead Vickers. S H Benson was the advertising agency that brought together the slogan, Guinness Is Good For You and illustrations by John Gilroy, their in-house artist. Gilroy’s first Guinness poster was produced in 1930 and he went on to create more than 100 press ads and 50 poster designs for Guinness.

Corporate change In 1948 S. H. Benson Ltd. invested $45,000 in David Ogilvy's fledgling company and insisted that Ogilvy hire someone who knew how to run an agency. Ogilvy hired Anderson Hewitt away from the J. Walter Thompson Company to be president, and appointed himself vice president in charge of research. The business opened as Hewitt, Ogilvy, Benson & Mather. S H Benson Ltd continued trading under its own name in London and in 1969, it became a public company. In 1971, Ogilvy and Mather bought S H Benson to form Ogilvy, Benson, and Mather.

S H Benson Ltd gave 800 of their posters to the British Museum and 175 to the Victoria and Albert Museum.

== Additional ==
In 1899, S H Benson organised the War Employment Bureau, an organisation for providing work for wives of reservists during the South African war.

S H Benson was reported to be a tremendous worker, honoured and respected by a large staff working under him.

Mr Benson's last illness was due to complications following his accident in November 1913 when he was run over by a motor-bus in Fleet Street. He died on 21 July 1914.
