= Reform Alliance (Ireland) =

- Formation: 13 September 2013
- Dissolved: 3 February 2016
- Type: Political group
- Legal status: Registered third party with SIPO
- Purpose: Political reform
- Region served: Ireland
- Website: reformalliance.ie

The Reform Alliance was an Irish political group formed on 13 September 2013 by Oireachtas members who had been expelled from the Fine Gael parliamentary party for voting against the party whip. Since the dissolution of the 31st Dail, it has been defunct. Its members described it as a "loose alliance" but did not preclude forming a political party in the future.

== Foundation ==
The Reform Alliance was announced on 13 September 2013 by five TDs (Lucinda Creighton, Terence Flanagan, Peter Mathews, Denis Naughten and Billy Timmins) and two senators (Paul Bradford and Fidelma Healy Eames). All had been expelled by Fine Gael; Naughten for opposing the downgrade of Roscommon County Hospital in the 2011 budget, and the others in July 2013 for opposing the Fine Gael–Labour coalition's Protection of Life During Pregnancy Act 2013. Brian Walsh, another Fine Gael TD expelled over the 2013 Act, declined to join the bloc. Creighton had the highest profile of the founders, having been Minister of State for European Affairs prior to her expulsion. She denied being the leader of the new group.

== Dáil recognition ==
Reform Alliance members requested a change to the standing orders of Dáil Éireann to allow it speaking rights. While some ministers suggested the TDs could join the technical group, other commentators argued they were ineligible as they had been elected for a recognised party. There was also speculation about a realignment of the pre-existing technical group, excluding the more left-wing members and including the Reform Alliance and other ex-government TDs.

On 18 September 2013, Ceann Comhairle Seán Barrett changed the procedure for allocation of time during debates on government business: in each round after the initial round of group spokespersons, a new slot for "others" is to be added after those of recognised groups. Opposition groups were critical of the decision, which would in effect reduce their allocations; some suggested Barrett, a member of Fine Gael, was breaching the neutrality expected of the Ceann Comhairle. This change does not extend to time and resources restricted to groups under standing orders; therefore, "others" have no access to leader's questions, private members' time, and committee membership.

== Policies ==
The logo, based on the Irish coat of arms, used for the RDS conference. The Alliance itself has no logo.

On 25 September 2013, Lucinda Creighton announced that the Alliance was calling for a no-vote in the referendum to abolish the Seanad. Its members had not opposed the bill's Oireachtas votes, which took place after their expulsion from Fine Gael but before the Alliance was formed. Creighton said the Alliance was likely to support the 2014 budget to be announced in October 2013.

The alliance announced a public conference to be held on 25 January 2014 in the Concert Hall of the RDS, Dublin. The Sunday Independent reported that invitations had been given to about 200 high-profile figures, including independent and ex-Fianna Fáil politicians, with media figures recruited to chair discussions. It plans "further conversations on reform in local meetings around the country in 2014". Members of Democracy Matters, although holding similar views to the alliance on Seanad reform, said they would not attend its conference.

The RDS meeting's attendance was reported as 1,000 by RTÉ. The sessions were on political reform (chaired by Tom McGurk; addressed by broadcaster Olivia O'Leary, "Big Society" theorist Phillip Blond, and academic Jane Suiter), on healthcare (chaired by journalist June Shannon; addressed by Jimmy Sheehan of the Blackrock Clinic, Pat Doorley of the Health Service Executive, and academic administrator Ed Walsh), and on the economy (chaired by economist David McWilliams).

== Party-like qualities ==
The group's founders, while expelled from the Fine Gael parliamentary party, initially remained ordinary members of the wider party, although ineligible under its rules for selection as party candidates at future elections. On 3 October 2013 Peter Mathews resigned from Fine Gael. In his resignation statement, he described himself as an "Independent TD" and the Reform Alliance as "flexible and collegial". In April 2014, it was reported that Denis Naughten had allowed his membership of Fine Gael to lapse 12 months earlier, and that Creighton and Bradford would let theirs lapse, whereas Flanagan and Healy Eames would renew theirs.

In December 2013 it was reported that the Reform Alliance had registered with the Standards in Public Office Commission as a "third party", which is a group that accepts donations for political campaigns without being a registered political party. This would allow it to raise funds for "research" and for campaigning in the May 2014 local and European elections. In June 2014 TheJournal.ie reported that this registration had not in fact happened, as the process was seen as "too cumbersome". The Sunday Independent reported that Creighton was in talks with independent TD Stephen Donnelly with a view to formally launching a new party in September 2014. Donnelly later said he would not attend the RDS conference. After the 2014 elections The Irish Times reported that Reform Alliance members were planning to discuss a new party with some independent politicians. TheJournal.ie was sceptical of the report. In October 2014 Creigton denied a Sunday Times report that she was "recruiting" for a new party for the next general election, but said she was talking to others about offering voters a "new vision" "different from the existing political parties". In November 2014, The Irish Times reported Creighton had issued invitations to constituency supporters for a December meeting to discuss a possible new party. In January 2015 Creighton announced the party would be launched that March, with the slogan "Reboot Ireland" used until a name was agreed for it. On 13 March 2015, the new party Renua was launched.
