= KILROY International =

Danish company

Kilroy International A/S (also known as just Kilroy International) is part of The Kilroy Group, a European group of companies in travel, educational counselling and student benefits.

== Kilroy International ==
As the parent company, Kilroy International serves as the headquarter for The Kilroy Group and is home to shared functions, managerial and service teams and staff within accounting, marketing, procurement, HR and systems, supporting all 21 branches across eight countries.

The headquarter is located in the city centre of Copenhagen in Denmark.

== The Group ==
The Kilroy Group consists six brands; BENNS, ISIC, Jysk Rejsebureau, KILROY, Education Abroad - Powered By KILROY and Winberg Travel, and operates in eight markets, employing more than 400 people in 2024.

The company operates in Denmark, Sweden, Norway, Finland, the Netherlands, Belgium, Iceland and The United Kingdom.

== Operations ==
The company operates 3 segments:

- Travel sells flight tickets and travel tours to all continents, travel experiences, accommodation, car rental and various forms of travel insurance. Most products are designed for youngsters and backpacker-type travelers.
- Education gives advice and guidance to people wishing to pursue an academic or professional degree abroad.
- Groups arranges study and group tours for mainly student groups in high school or upper secondary school.
- Student Benefits through the student identification and lifestyle card; ISIC.

== History ==
A wish to improve young people's cultural understanding after the Second World War led student organisations in several Nordic countries to establish travel agencies. These, DIS rejser in Denmark, SFS Resebyrå in Sweden, Univers Reiser in Norway and Travela in Finland, cooperated in purchasing and distributing travel products under the name Scandinavian Student Travel Services, SSTS, from the early 1950s and eventually merged in 1991 to become KILROY. In 1999 BENNS was acquired and incorporated in the Group. In 2010 parts of the Danish KILROY operations was merged with Jysk Rejsebureau. KILROY Foundation was established in 2013. In 2014 ISIC was launched as a separate brand within the Group. In 2018 Swedish travel agency Winberg Travel was acquired.
