= Kilroy's College =

Kilroy's College is a distance learning institution based in Dublin, Ireland. The college is a registered QQI course provider.

== History ==
The school was founded in 1932 by P.J. Kilroy and originally known as the 'Irish Correspondence College'.

The school was taken over by Charles Kilroy in the 1960s. His son Patrick Kilroy took over running of Kilroy's College in 1999.

Courses were initially offered by correspondence education, and aimed primarily at adult learners. In 1937, the school began teaching Leaving Certificate subjects to school leaving students.

== See also ==
- Distance Education
- Education in the Republic of Ireland
