= Kilroy (surname) =

Kilroy is a surname of Irish origin, specifically from County Roscommon, an anglicisation of Irish Gaelic Mac Giolla Ráith. It may refer to:

== People ==
- Alix Kilroy (1903–1999), one of the first two women to have entered the administrative grade of the British Civil Service by examination
- Bucko Kilroy (1921–2007), American National Football League player, scout and general manager
- Debbie Kilroy (born 1961), Australian human rights activist, prison reformer and lawyer
- Eddie Kilroy, stage name of American country music producer Alva Dave Moore
- Elmer Kilroy (1895–1961), American politician
- Howard Kilroy, Irish accountant and businessman
- James Kilroy (politician) (1890–1954), Irish Fianna Fáil politician
- James J. Kilroy (1902–1962), American shipyard worker and politician, thought by some to be the origin of the "Kilroy was here" graffito
- James Kilroy (born 1973), convicted of the murder of Valerie French
- Jim Kilroy, American sailboat racer from 1950s to the 1980s
- Joe Kilroy (born 1960), Australian rugby league player
- Mark Kilroy (born 1968), American college student kidnapped, tortured and killed as a human sacrifice by cultists in Mexico
- Mary Jo Kilroy (born 1949), American politician
- Matt Kilroy (1866–1940), American Major League Baseball pitcher
- Matthew Kilroy (British Army soldier), British Army soldier convicted of manslaughter in 1770 in the Boston Massacre
- Michael Kilroy (1884–1962), Irish politician and member of the Irish Republican Army
- Mike Kilroy (1869–1960), American Major League Baseball pitcher
- Richard I. Kilroy (1927–2007), American labor union president and vice-president of the AFL-CIO
- Thomas Kilroy (born 1934), Irish playwright and novelist

== Fictional characters ==
- the title character of Ace Kilroy, a webcomic launched in 2011

== See also ==
- Robert Kilroy-Silk, British politician and television presenter
