= Niall Ó Brolcháin =

Irish politician (born 1965)

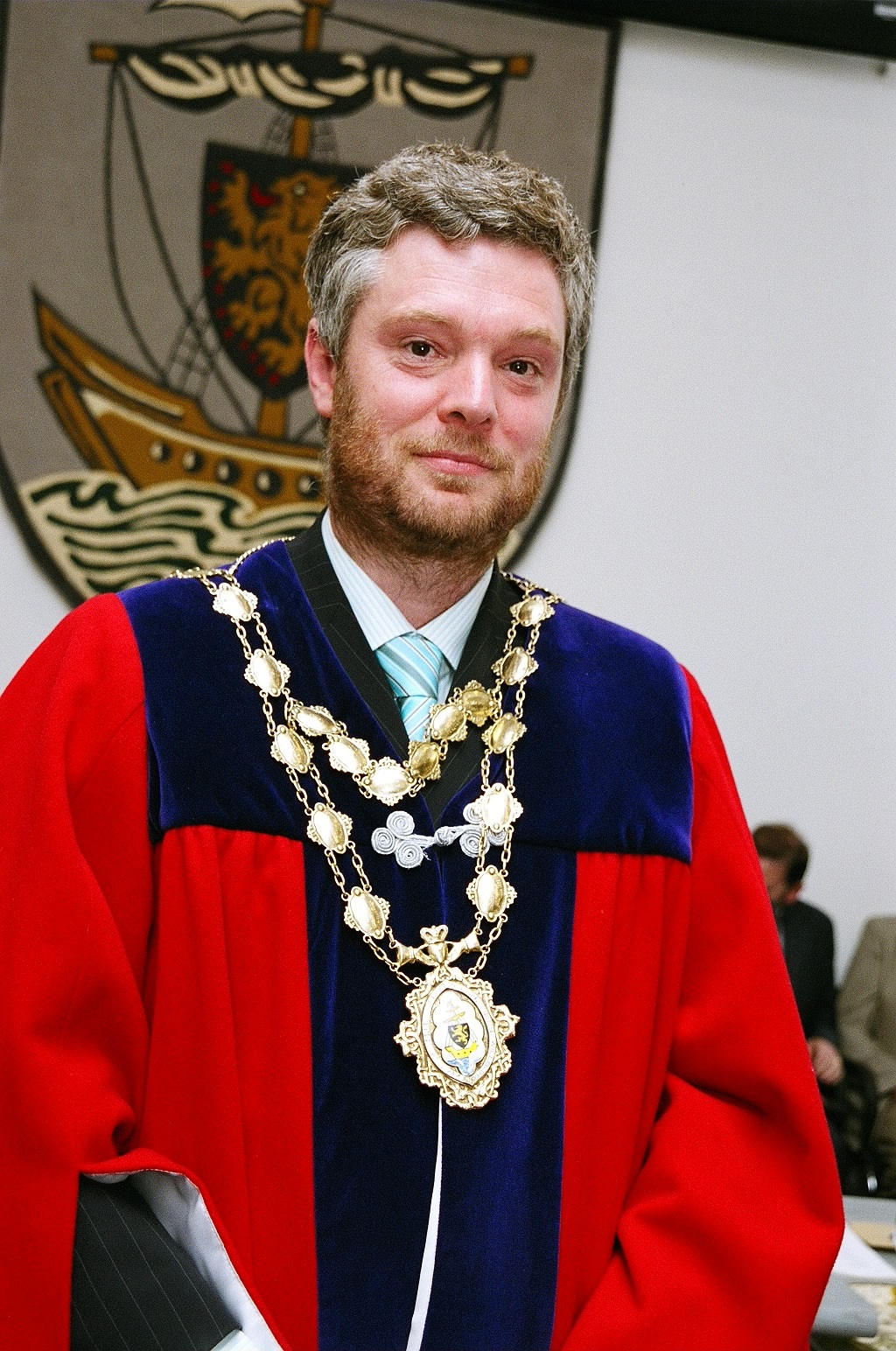
- Ó Brolcháin in 2006

Senator
- In office 14 December 2009 – 25 May 2011
- Constituency: Agricultural Panel

Mayor of Galway
- In office 19 June 2006 – 19 June 2007
- Preceded by: Brian Walsh
- Succeeded by: Tom Costello

Personal details
- Born: 14 April 1965 (age 61) Galway, Ireland
- Party: Green Party

Niall Ó Brolcháin (Irish pronunciation: [ˈn̠ʲiəl̪ˠ oː ˈbˠɾˠɔlˠəxaːnʲ]; born 14 April 1965) is an Irish former Green Party politician who served as a senator for the Agricultural Panel from December 2009 to May 2011. He served as Mayor of Galway from 2006 to 2007.

== Galway City Council ==
He was elected in June 2004 with 10.93% (881 votes) of the vote. His victory was one of the closest of the elections, beating Fianna Fáil's Tom Cox by 40 votes.

He worked on various campaigns ranging from Quality Bus Corridors to better sewage treatment and waste management facilities. He has worked on many local committees including the city's Economic Development Group and Environment Strategic Policy Committee, and became Galway's first Green Party Mayor in June 2006. He opened the Galway City Museum to the public. He is a campaigner for the Western Railway Corridor, Light rail for Galway and water quality issues.

Prior to his campaign for City Council, he ran for Dáil Éireann in the Galway West constituency at the 2002 general election receiving 4.4% (2,193 votes) of the vote but was not elected. In February 2005, he was nominated as Galway West's Green Party candidate for the 2007 general election, but he failed to be elected getting 5.5% (3,026 votes) of the vote.

He failed to get elected by just 26 votes in another cliffhanger in the new 5 seat electoral area of Galway City West in what was a very poor election for the Green Party nationally. He got 8.0% (706 votes) of the vote.

== Seanad Éireann ==
He was elected to the Seanad for the Agricultural Panel on 14 December 2009 in a by-election caused by Alan Kelly's election to the European Parliament. Ó Brolchain was nominated as the Green Party candidate and received the backing of coalition partners, Fianna Fáil. The electorate consisted of members of the Dáil and Seanad. He won 119 votes out of 205.

He lost his seat at the 2011 Seanad election.

== After politics ==
He works as a research unit leader with the ASPECT Unit (Analytics for Sustainable Policies towards Environmental and Climate Transition) at the Insight Centre for Data Analytics (formerly DERI) in the University of Galway.

Civic offices
Preceded by Brian Walsh	Mayor of Galway; 2006–2007	Succeeded by Tom Costello
