= Brian Walsh (politician) =

Irish former politician (born 1972)

Teachta Dála
- In office February 2011 – February 2016
- Constituency: Galway West

Mayor of Galway
- In office 11 July 2006 – 12 July 2007
- Preceded by: Catherine Connolly
- Succeeded by: Niall Ó Brolcháin

Personal details
- Born: 28 September 1972 (age 53) Galway, Ireland
- Party: Fine Gael
- Spouse: Fiona Flatley (m. 2005)
- Children: 2
- Education: Galway-Mayo Institute of Technology

Brian Walsh (born 28 September 1972) is an Irish former Fine Gael politician who served as a Teachta Dála (TD) for the Galway West constituency from 2011 to 2016. He also served as Mayor of Galway from 2006 to 2007.

He sat for a time as an independent TD, having lost the Fine Gael parliamentary party whip, from July 2013 to April 2014.

== Local politics ==
He was elected to Galway City Council in 2004 and re-elected in 2009. He was the Mayor of Galway from 2005 to 2006 and was the city's youngest ever mayor.

Redevelopment work on Eyre Square in Galway began in 2004. There was controversy when the building contractors, Samuel Kingston Construction, left the site and did not return. Some businesses were affected by the abandoned building site which had become an embarrassment to the city. On becoming Mayor of Galway, Walsh set up a task force to take charge of the project, and he led the effort to complete the works. The square re-opened on 13 April 2006.

== 2011 general election ==
In December 2010, Walsh was selected by Fine Gael to contest the next general election in Galway West. Fine Gael TD Pádraic McCormack subsequently announced his retirement after not being selected at the party convention. Senator Fidelma Healy Eames was also selected by the party to contest the election. Councillors Seán Kyne and Hildegarde Naughton were subsequently added to the ticket as the party adopted an offensive electoral strategy in the constituency.

== Expulsion from parliamentary party ==
Walsh was expelled from the Fine Gael parliamentary party on 2 July 2013, when he defied the party whip by voting against the Protection of Life During Pregnancy Bill 2013. He was re-admitted to the parliamentary party on 30 April 2014.

He did not contest the 2016 general election. He resigned as a TD on 14 January 2016, due to health concerns.

== Controversies since resignation ==
On 28 February 2016, the Irish Sunday Times ran an article stating that Walsh has applied for a medical pension to the Oireachtas Pension Scheme on 16 December 2015, weeks prior to his resignation the following month. The Irish Sunday Times stated that the pension was requested on "grounds of ill health" and could be worth €500,000 if granted.

On 6 March 2016, the Irish Sunday Times ran an article stating that Walsh had directly lobbied NAMA in respect of the sale of lands by NAMA which were subsequently sold to a business partner of Brian Walsh.

On 13 March 2016, the Irish Sunday Times ran an article stating that Walsh had lobbied NAMA from 2012 to 2014 on half of a long term property developer associate who owned a Hotel in Galway, and who owed NAMA over €100m.

On 13 March 2016, Walsh indicated to Galway Media Outlets his intention to sue the Sunday Times, and that "he's absolutely confident that his good name will be vindicated". However, no such proceedings were ever taken.

Civic offices
Preceded by Catherine Connolly	Mayor of Galway; 2005–2006	Succeeded by Niall Ó Brolcháin

Dáil	Election	Deputy (Party)	Deputy (Party)	Deputy (Party)	Deputy (Party)	Deputy (Party)
9th	1937	Gerald Bartley (FF)	Joseph Mongan (FG)	Seán Tubridy (FF)	3 seats 1937–1977	
10th	1938	Gerald Bartley (FF)	Joseph Mongan (FG)	Seán Tubridy (FF)	3 seats 1937–1977	
10th	1940 by-election	Gerald Bartley (FF)	Joseph Mongan (FG)	John J. Keane (FF)	3 seats 1937–1977	
11th	1943	Gerald Bartley (FF)	Joseph Mongan (FG)	Eamon Corbett (FF)	3 seats 1937–1977	
12th	1944	Gerald Bartley (FF)	Joseph Mongan (FG)	Michael Lydon (FF)	3 seats 1937–1977	
13th	1948	Gerald Bartley (FF)	Joseph Mongan (FG)	Michael Lydon (FF)	3 seats 1937–1977	
14th	1951	Gerald Bartley (FF)	John Mannion Snr (FG)	Peadar Duignan (FF)	3 seats 1937–1977	
15th	1954	Gerald Bartley (FF)	Fintan Coogan Snr (FG)	Johnny Geoghegan (FF)	3 seats 1937–1977	
16th	1957	Gerald Bartley (FF)	Fintan Coogan Snr (FG)	Johnny Geoghegan (FF)	3 seats 1937–1977	
17th	1961	Gerald Bartley (FF)	Fintan Coogan Snr (FG)	Johnny Geoghegan (FF)	3 seats 1937–1977	
18th	1965	Bobby Molloy (FF)	Fintan Coogan Snr (FG)	Johnny Geoghegan (FF)	3 seats 1937–1977	
19th	1969	Bobby Molloy (FF)	Fintan Coogan Snr (FG)	Johnny Geoghegan (FF)	3 seats 1937–1977	
20th	1973	Bobby Molloy (FF)	Fintan Coogan Snr (FG)	Johnny Geoghegan (FF)	3 seats 1937–1977	
20th	1975 by-election	Bobby Molloy (FF)	Fintan Coogan Snr (FG)	Máire Geoghegan-Quinn (FF)	3 seats 1937–1977	
21st	1977	Bobby Molloy (FF)	John Mannion Jnr (FG)	Máire Geoghegan-Quinn (FF)	Bill Loughnane (FF)	4 seats 1977–1981
22nd	1981	Bobby Molloy (FF)	John Donnellan (FG)	Máire Geoghegan-Quinn (FF)	Mark Killilea Jnr (FF)	Michael D. Higgins (Lab)
23rd	1982 (Feb)	Bobby Molloy (FF)	John Donnellan (FG)	Máire Geoghegan-Quinn (FF)	Frank Fahey (FF)	Michael D. Higgins (Lab)
24th	1982 (Nov)	Bobby Molloy (FF)	John Donnellan (FG)	Máire Geoghegan-Quinn (FF)	Frank Fahey (FF)	Fintan Coogan Jnr (FG)
25th	1987	Bobby Molloy (PDs)	John Donnellan (FG)	Máire Geoghegan-Quinn (FF)	Frank Fahey (FF)	Michael D. Higgins (Lab)
26th	1989	Bobby Molloy (PDs)	Pádraic McCormack (FG)	Máire Geoghegan-Quinn (FF)	Frank Fahey (FF)	Michael D. Higgins (Lab)
27th	1992	Bobby Molloy (PDs)	Pádraic McCormack (FG)	Máire Geoghegan-Quinn (FF)	Éamon Ó Cuív (FF)	Michael D. Higgins (Lab)
28th	1997	Bobby Molloy (PDs)	Pádraic McCormack (FG)	Frank Fahey (FF)	Éamon Ó Cuív (FF)	Michael D. Higgins (Lab)
29th	2002	Noel Grealish (PDs)	Pádraic McCormack (FG)	Frank Fahey (FF)	Éamon Ó Cuív (FF)	Michael D. Higgins (Lab)
30th	2007	Noel Grealish (PDs)	Pádraic McCormack (FG)	Frank Fahey (FF)	Éamon Ó Cuív (FF)	Michael D. Higgins (Lab)
31st	2011	Noel Grealish (Ind.)	Brian Walsh (FG)	Seán Kyne (FG)	Éamon Ó Cuív (FF)	Derek Nolan (Lab)
32nd	2016	Noel Grealish (Ind.)	Hildegarde Naughton (FG)	Seán Kyne (FG)	Éamon Ó Cuív (FF)	Catherine Connolly (Ind.)
33rd	2020	Noel Grealish (Ind.)	Hildegarde Naughton (FG)	Mairéad Farrell (SF)	Éamon Ó Cuív (FF)	Catherine Connolly (Ind.)
34th	2024	Noel Grealish (Ind.)	Hildegarde Naughton (FG)	Mairéad Farrell (SF)	John Connolly (FF)	Catherine Connolly (Ind.)
34th	2026 by-election	Noel Grealish (Ind.)	Hildegarde Naughton (FG)	Mairéad Farrell (SF)	John Connolly (FF)	Seán Kyne (FG)
