= Billy Timmins =

Irish former politician (born 1959)

Deputy leader of Renua
- In office 13 March 2015 – 14 May 2016
- Leader: Lucinda Creighton

Teachta Dála
- In office June 1997 – February 2016
- Constituency: Wicklow

Personal details
- Born: 1 October 1959 (age 66) Baltinglass, County Wicklow, Ireland
- Party: Fine Gael (1997–2013; since 2018)
- Other political affiliations: Independent (2013–2015, 2016–2018); Renua (2015–2016)
- Parent: Godfrey Timmins (father)
- Relatives: Edward Timmins (brother)
- Education: University College Galway

Billy Timmins (born 1 October 1959) is an Irish former politician. He was a Teachta Dála (TD) for the Wicklow constituency from 1997 until the 2016 general election. He was the deputy leader of Renua from the foundation of the party in March 2015 until May 2016. He previously sat as an Independent TD, having lost the Fine Gael parliamentary party whip in July 2013.

== Background ==
Timmins was born in Baltinglass, County Wicklow. He was educated at Patrician College, Ballyfin, County Laois; at University College Galway where he received a Bachelor of Arts degree in Economics and Legal Science; and at the Military College, Curragh. Timmins served as an army officer, serving in Counties Galway, Donegal and Kilkenny and with the United Nations in Lebanon and Cyprus.

Timmins was first elected to Dáil Éireann for the Wicklow constituency at the 1997 general election, succeeding his father Godfrey Timmins who had retired. On his election to the Dáil, he became party spokesperson on Defence, Peacekeeping and Humanitarian Relief. He was elected to Wicklow County Council for the Baltinglass area in 1999 and served until 2004. In 2000 he became party spokesperson on Housing.

Following the 2002 general election he was appointed spokesperson on Agriculture and Food. In Enda Kenny's front bench reshuffle in 2004 he received the Defence spokesperson portfolio. He was party spokesperson on Foreign Affairs from 2007 to 2010. In June 2010 he supported Richard Bruton's leadership challenge to Enda Kenny. Following Kenny's victory in a motion of confidence, Timmins was not re-appointed to the front bench. From October 2010 to March 2011 he was party deputy spokesperson on Social Protection with special responsibility for Pension and Welfare Reform.

Timmins was expelled from the Fine Gael parliamentary party on 2 July 2013 when he defied the party whip by voting against the Protection of Life During Pregnancy Bill 2013. On 13 September 2013 he and six other expellees formed the Reform Alliance, most of whose supporters moved on to its successor Renua Ireland. He stood as a Renua candidate at the 2016 general election, but lost his seat. In May 2016, he announced his resignation from Renua.

Timmins rejoined the Fine Gael party in April 2018 and on 11 May 2018 was selected, along with Andrew Doyle and Simon Harris, to be a Fine Gael candidate for Wicklow for the next general election. He was an unsuccessful Fine Gael candidate for the Wicklow constituency at the 2020 general election.

== See also ==
- Families in the Oireachtas

Dáil	Election	Deputy (Party)	Deputy (Party)	Deputy (Party)	Deputy (Party)	Deputy (Party)
4th	1923	Christopher Byrne (CnaG)	James Everett (Lab)	Richard Wilson (FP)	3 seats 1923–1981	
5th	1927 (Jun)	Séamus Moore (FF)	James Everett (Lab)	Dermot O'Mahony (CnaG)	3 seats 1923–1981	
6th	1927 (Sep)	Séamus Moore (FF)	James Everett (Lab)	Dermot O'Mahony (CnaG)	3 seats 1923–1981	
7th	1932	Séamus Moore (FF)	James Everett (Lab)	Dermot O'Mahony (CnaG)	3 seats 1923–1981	
8th	1933	Séamus Moore (FF)	James Everett (Lab)	Dermot O'Mahony (CnaG)	3 seats 1923–1981	
9th	1937	Séamus Moore (FF)	James Everett (Lab)	Dermot O'Mahony (FG)	3 seats 1923–1981	
10th	1938	Séamus Moore (FF)	James Everett (Lab)	Patrick Cogan (Ind.)	3 seats 1923–1981	
11th	1943	Christopher Byrne (FF)	James Everett (Lab)	Patrick Cogan (CnaT)	3 seats 1923–1981	
12th	1944	Thomas Brennan (FF)	James Everett (NLP)	Patrick Cogan (CnaT)	3 seats 1923–1981	
13th	1948	Thomas Brennan (FF)	James Everett (NLP)	Patrick Cogan (Ind.)	3 seats 1923–1981	
14th	1951	Thomas Brennan (FF)	James Everett (Lab)	Patrick Cogan (Ind.)	3 seats 1923–1981	
14th	1953 by-election	Mark Deering (FG)	James Everett (Lab)	Patrick Cogan (Ind.)	3 seats 1923–1981	
15th	1954	Mark Deering (FG)	James Everett (Lab)	Paudge Brennan (FF)	3 seats 1923–1981	
16th	1957	James O'Toole (FF)	James Everett (Lab)	Paudge Brennan (FF)	3 seats 1923–1981	
17th	1961	Michael O'Higgins (FG)	James Everett (Lab)	Paudge Brennan (FF)	3 seats 1923–1981	
18th	1965	Michael O'Higgins (FG)	James Everett (Lab)	Paudge Brennan (FF)	3 seats 1923–1981	
18th	1968 by-election	Michael O'Higgins (FG)	Godfrey Timmins (FG)	Paudge Brennan (FF)	3 seats 1923–1981	
19th	1969	Liam Kavanagh (Lab)	Godfrey Timmins (FG)	Paudge Brennan (FF)	3 seats 1923–1981	
20th	1973	Liam Kavanagh (Lab)	Godfrey Timmins (FG)	Ciarán Murphy (FF)	3 seats 1923–1981	
21st	1977	Liam Kavanagh (Lab)	Godfrey Timmins (FG)	Ciarán Murphy (FF)	3 seats 1923–1981	
22nd	1981	Liam Kavanagh (Lab)	Godfrey Timmins (FG)	Ciarán Murphy (FF)	Paudge Brennan (FF)	4 seats 1981–1992
23rd	1982 (Feb)	Liam Kavanagh (Lab)	Godfrey Timmins (FG)	Ciarán Murphy (FF)	Gemma Hussey (FG)	4 seats 1981–1992
24th	1982 (Nov)	Liam Kavanagh (Lab)	Godfrey Timmins (FG)	Paudge Brennan (FF)	Gemma Hussey (FG)	4 seats 1981–1992
25th	1987	Liam Kavanagh (Lab)	Joe Jacob (FF)	Dick Roche (FF)	Gemma Hussey (FG)	4 seats 1981–1992
26th	1989	Liam Kavanagh (Lab)	Joe Jacob (FF)	Dick Roche (FF)	Godfrey Timmins (FG)	4 seats 1981–1992
27th	1992	Liam Kavanagh (Lab)	Joe Jacob (FF)	Liz McManus (DL)	Godfrey Timmins (FG)	Johnny Fox (Ind.)
27th	1995 by-election	Liam Kavanagh (Lab)	Joe Jacob (FF)	Liz McManus (DL)	Godfrey Timmins (FG)	Mildred Fox (Ind.)
28th	1997	Dick Roche (FF)	Joe Jacob (FF)	Liz McManus (DL)	Billy Timmins (FG)	Mildred Fox (Ind.)
29th	2002	Dick Roche (FF)	Joe Jacob (FF)	Liz McManus (Lab)	Billy Timmins (FG)	Mildred Fox (Ind.)
30th	2007	Dick Roche (FF)	Joe Behan (FF)	Liz McManus (Lab)	Billy Timmins (FG)	Andrew Doyle (FG)
31st	2011	Simon Harris (FG)	Stephen Donnelly (Ind.)	Anne Ferris (Lab)	Billy Timmins (FG)	Andrew Doyle (FG)
32nd	2016	Simon Harris (FG)	Stephen Donnelly (SD)	John Brady (SF)	Pat Casey (FF)	Andrew Doyle (FG)
33rd	2020	Simon Harris (FG)	Stephen Donnelly (FF)	John Brady (SF)	Jennifer Whitmore (SD)	Steven Matthews (GP)
34th	2024	Simon Harris (FG)	Edward Timmins (FG)	John Brady (SF)	Jennifer Whitmore (SD)	4 seats since 2024
