= Terence Flanagan =

Irish politician (born 1975)

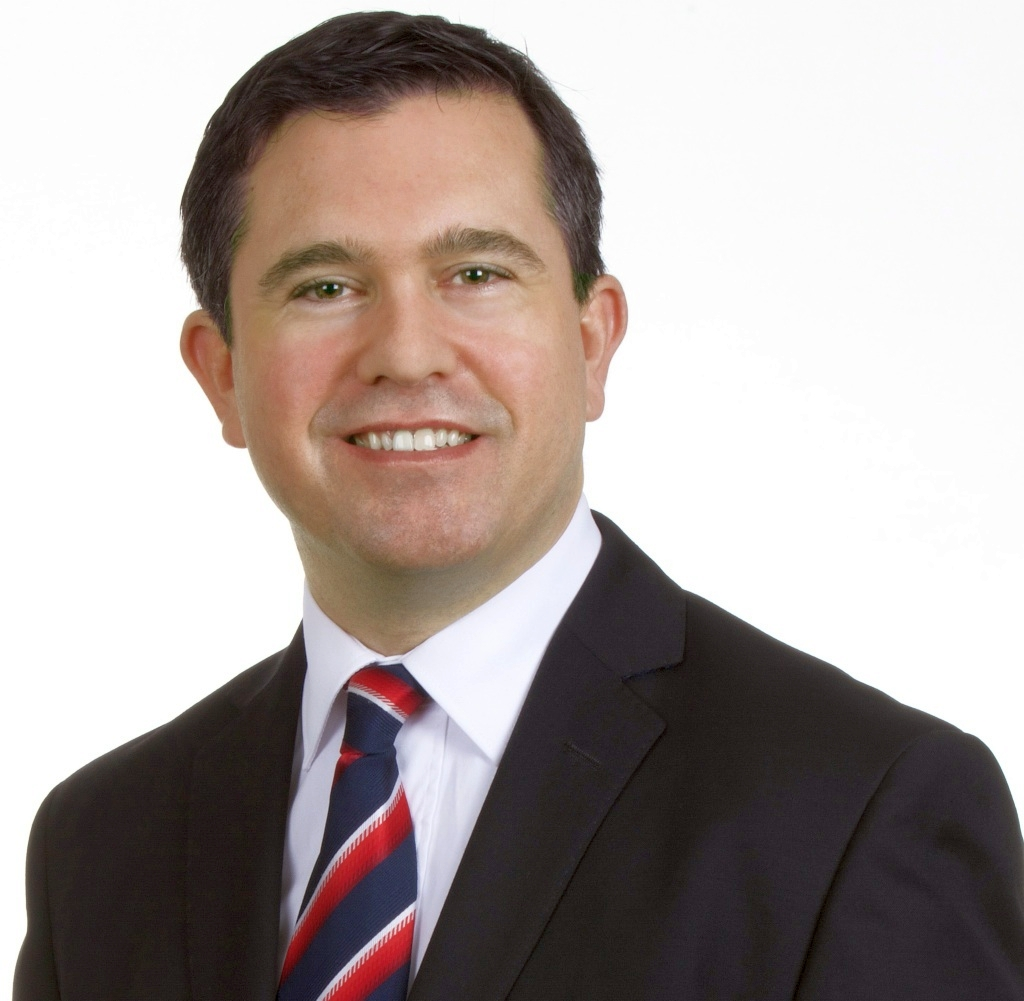

Dublin City Councillor
- In office May 2019 – June 2024
- Constituency: Donaghmede

Teachta Dála
- In office May 2007 – February 2016
- Constituency: Dublin North-East

Personal details
- Born: 1 January 1975 (age 51) Dublin, Ireland
- Party: Fine Gael (until 2013), (since 2017)
- Other political affiliations: Independent (2013–2015); Renua (2015–2017)
- Education: Dublin Business School

Terence Flanagan (born 1 January 1975) is an Irish Fine Gael politician who served as a Dublin City Councillor from 2019 to 2024. He previously served as a Teachta Dála (TD) for the Dublin North-East constituency from 2007 to 2016.

== Career ==
He was a member of Dublin City Council from 2003 until 2007, originally co-opted onto the council to replace Richard Bruton, due to the ending of dual mandates in September 2003, he was elected to the Council in 2004 obtaining 2594 first preference votes. Upon Flanagan's election to the Dáil in 2007 for the now defunct Dublin North East Constituency, his brother Declan Flanagan P.C was co-opted onto the City Council as his replacement.

In February 2008, Flanagan made a speech which was notably similar to a previous one by Labour Party TD Joan Burton. He initially denied that the speech was copied, but later issued a statement admitting and apologising for the plagiarism. He was Fine Gael deputy spokesperson on the Environment, with special responsibility for Housing, from October 2007 to March 2011. Flanagan was re-elected to the Dáil in February 2011 with 12,332 first-preference votes.

Flanagan was expelled from the Fine Gael parliamentary party on 2 July 2013, when he defied the party whip by voting against the Protection of Life During Pregnancy Bill 2013. On 13 September 2013, he and six other expellees formed the Reform Alliance, described as a "loose alliance" rather than a political party.

On 13 March 2015, Renua was launched, with Flanagan as one of its three sitting TDs and many other Reform Alliance members as declared election candidates. Later that day Flanagan represented the party in an interview on RTÉ's Drivetime radio news programme, where he was unable to answer any questions about the party's policies.

Flanagan stood as a Renua candidate for the new Dublin Bay North constituency at the 2016 general election, but lost his seat, being eliminated at the 9th count.

In April 2017, it was announced that he would rejoin Fine Gael.

In November 2018, he was selected by local Fine Gael branches to be a candidate in the Donaghmede Local Electoral Area of Dublin City Council to contest the 2019 Local Elections. In April 2019, he was warned by Dublin City Council litter wardens for breach of regulations after putting up election posters in advance of the permitted day. He claimed he was at a disadvantage for having done so. He was also forced to apologise after his poster erections at 3 am alarmed an elderly woman.

Flanagan was elected to Dublin City Council in the 2019 local elections, in the Donaghmede area. He failed to win re-election in the 2024 local elections.

Dáil	Election	Deputy (Party)	Deputy (Party)	Deputy (Party)	Deputy (Party)	Deputy (Party)
9th	1937	Alfie Byrne (Ind.)	Oscar Traynor (FF)	James Larkin (Ind.)	3 seats 1937–1948	
10th	1938	Alfie Byrne (Ind.)	Oscar Traynor (FF)	Richard Mulcahy (FG)	3 seats 1937–1948	
11th	1943	Alfie Byrne (Ind.)	Oscar Traynor (FF)	James Larkin (Lab)	3 seats 1937–1948	
12th	1944	Alfie Byrne (Ind.)	Oscar Traynor (FF)	Harry Colley (FF)	3 seats 1937–1948	
13th	1948	Alfie Byrne (Ind.)	Oscar Traynor (FF)	Harry Colley (FF)	Jack Belton (FG)	Peadar Cowan (CnaP)
14th	1951	Alfie Byrne (Ind.)	Oscar Traynor (FF)	Harry Colley (FF)	Jack Belton (FG)	Peadar Cowan (Ind.)
15th	1954	Alfie Byrne (Ind.)	Oscar Traynor (FF)	Harry Colley (FF)	Jack Belton (FG)	Denis Larkin (Lab)
15th	1956 by-election	Patrick Byrne (FG)	Oscar Traynor (FF)	Harry Colley (FF)	Jack Belton (FG)	Denis Larkin (Lab)
16th	1957	Patrick Byrne (FG)	Oscar Traynor (FF)	Charles Haughey (FF)	Jack Belton (FG)	Denis Larkin (Lab)
17th	1961	Patrick Byrne (FG)	George Colley (FF)	Charles Haughey (FF)	Jack Belton (FG)	Eugene Timmons (FF)
17th	1963 by-election	Patrick Byrne (FG)	George Colley (FF)	Charles Haughey (FF)	Paddy Belton (FG)	Eugene Timmons (FF)
18th	1965	Patrick Byrne (FG)	George Colley (FF)	Charles Haughey (FF)	Paddy Belton (FG)	Denis Larkin (Lab)
19th	1969	Conor Cruise O'Brien (Lab)	Eugene Timmons (FF)	Charles Haughey (FF)	Paddy Belton (FG)	4 seats 1969–1977
20th	1973	Conor Cruise O'Brien (Lab)	Eugene Timmons (FF)	Charles Haughey (FF)	Paddy Belton (FG)	4 seats 1969–1977
21st	1977	Constituency abolished				

Dáil	Election	Deputy (Party)	Deputy (Party)	Deputy (Party)	Deputy (Party)
22nd	1981	Michael Woods (FF)	Liam Fitzgerald (FF)	Seán Dublin Bay Rockall Loftus (Ind.)	Michael Joe Cosgrave (FG)
23rd	1982 (Feb)	Michael Woods (FF)	Maurice Manning (FG)	Ned Brennan (FF)	Michael Joe Cosgrave (FG)
24th	1982 (Nov)	Michael Woods (FF)	Maurice Manning (FG)	Liam Fitzgerald (FF)	Michael Joe Cosgrave (FG)
25th	1987	Michael Woods (FF)	Pat McCartan (WP)	Liam Fitzgerald (FF)	Michael Joe Cosgrave (FG)
26th	1989	Michael Woods (FF)	Pat McCartan (WP)	Liam Fitzgerald (FF)	Michael Joe Cosgrave (FG)
27th	1992	Michael Woods (FF)	Tommy Broughan (Lab)	Liam Fitzgerald (FF)	Seán Kenny (Lab)
28th	1997	Michael Woods (FF)	Tommy Broughan (Lab)	Martin Brady (FF)	Michael Joe Cosgrave (FG)
29th	2002	Michael Woods (FF)	Tommy Broughan (Lab)	Martin Brady (FF)	3 seats from 2002
30th	2007	Michael Woods (FF)	Tommy Broughan (Lab)	Terence Flanagan (FG)	3 seats from 2002
31st	2011	Seán Kenny (Lab)	Tommy Broughan (Lab)	Terence Flanagan (FG)	3 seats from 2002
32nd	2016	Constituency abolished. See Dublin Bay North			
