= John Gilroy (artist) =

English artist and illustrator (1898–1985)

- Born: John Thomas Young Gilroy; 30 May 1898; Whitley Bay, Northumberland, England
- Died: 11 April 1985 (aged 86); Guildford, Surrey, England
- Education: Durham University; Royal College of Art
- Known for: Guinness advertising posters
- Spouses: Gwendoline Short (1924-?); Elizabeth Margaret Outram Bramley (1950-?)

John Thomas Young Gilroy (30 May 1898 – 11 April 1985) was an English artist and illustrator, best known for his advertising posters for Guinness, the Irish stout. He signed many of his works, simply, "Gilroy".

== Life ==
Born in Whitley Bay, Northumberland, England, Gilroy attended Durham University until his studies were interrupted by World War I, during which he served with the Royal Field Artillery. He resumed studying at the Royal College of Art in London, where he remained as a teacher. He taught at Camberwell College of Arts.

In 1925, he gained employment at S.H. Benson's advertising agency, where he created the iconic advertisement art for Guinness featuring the Zoo Keeper and animals enjoying Guinness. He worked with the crime writer Dorothy L. Sayers. He created cover designs for the Radio Times, most famously, in 1936, one depicting a laughing cat. He was also an accomplished portrait painter, numbering royalty, politicians, actors and many others amongst his sitters. He worked in his large studio at 10 Holland Park, London, the former home and studio of Sir Bernard Partridge. He was a long-standing and much loved member of the Garrick Club, where he was created a Life Member and Chairman of the Works of Art Committee 1970–1975. He was awarded an honorary MA by Newcastle University in 1975, and was made a Freeman of the City of London in 1981.

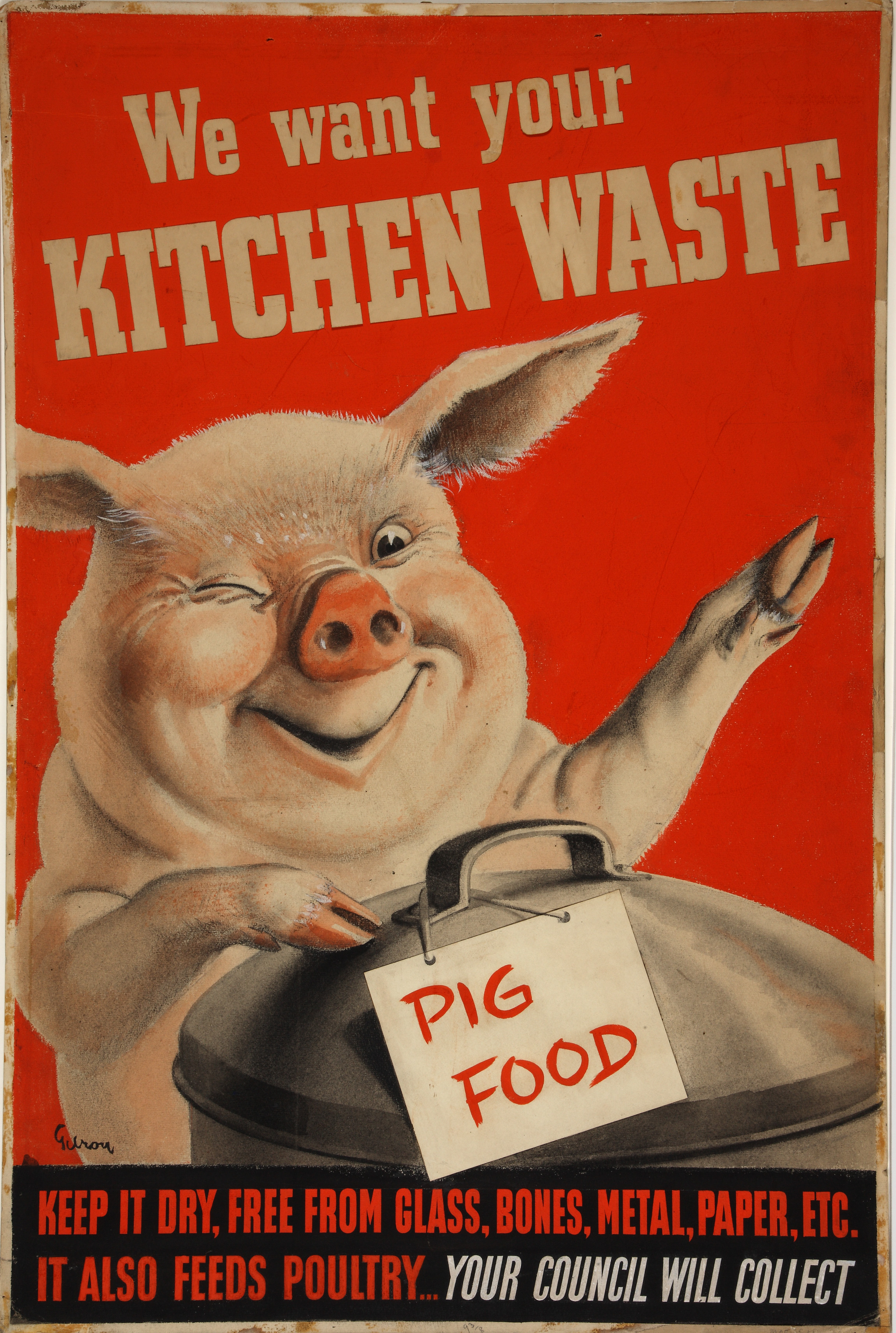
Wartime poster by John Gilroy for the Ministry of Information

John Gilroy died at Guildford on 11 April 1985.

== Family ==
John Gilroy married twice. First, in 1924, to Gwendoline Short, an artist like himself. They had one son - John Morritt in 1927. His second marriage, in 1950, was to Elizabeth Margaret Outram Bramley who already had a daughter (Jenefer) and a son (Robin).
