= John Gilroy (politician) =

Irish former politician (born 1967)

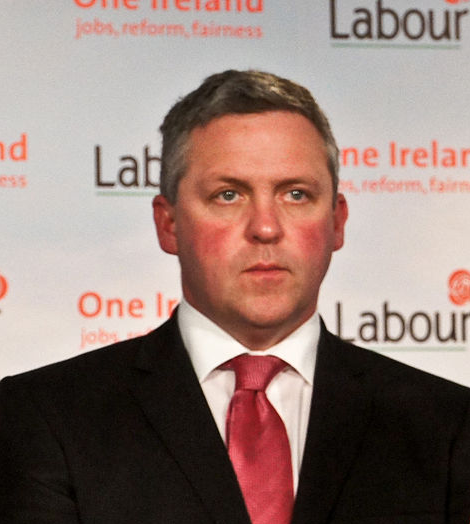

Senator
- In office 25 May 2011 – 8 June 2016
- Constituency: Cultural and Educational Panel

Personal details
- Born: 20 July 1967 (age 58) Athboy, County Meath, Ireland
- Party: Labour Party
- Spouse: Marion Gilroy
- Children: 2
- Profession: Former Psychiatric nurse

John Gilroy (born 20 July 1967) is an Irish former Labour Party politician. He was elected to the 24th Seanad in April 2011 on the Cultural and Educational Panel. He was previously a member of Cork County Council from 2004 to 2011 for the Blarney local electoral area. He was an unsuccessful candidate at the 2011 general election for the Cork North-Central constituency, polling 6,125 first preference votes (11.7%).

He is a former Psychiatric nurse. He was the Labour Party Seanad spokesperson on Health, Public Service, Reform and the Office of Public Works during his term in office.
