= Fidelma Healy Eames =

Irish former politician and academic (born 1962)

Senator
- In office 13 September 2007 – 8 June 2016
- Constituency: Labour Panel

Personal details
- Born: Fidelma Healy; 14 July 1962 (age 64) Moylough, County Galway, Ireland
- Party: Independent (from July 2013)
- Other political affiliations: Fine Gael
- Spouse: Michael Eames
- Education: Carysfort College; Western Connecticut SU; NUI Galway
- Occupation: Primary school teacher; College lecturer

Fidelma Healy Eames (born 14 July 1962) is an Irish former politician. She was first elected to Seanad Éireann in 2007 by the Labour Panel. As a member of the Reform Alliance group, she sat as an Independent senator, having lost the Fine Gael parliamentary party whip in July 2013. In March 2016 she announced her retirement from politics. In April 2019, Healy Eames was a candidate in the 2019 European Parliament election in Ireland for the Midlands–North-West.

== Personal life and business ==
Healy Eames was born in Lakeview, Moylough, County Galway. She attended St. Patricks NS, Moylough and Holy Rosary College, Mountbellew. She grew up on the family dairy farm with her three sisters and one brother. Healy Eames is married to Michael Eames. They live in Oranmore, County Galway.

Healy Eames graduated from both Carysfort College, Western Connecticut State University in the US, and NUI Galway, holding B.Ed., M.Sc., and Ph.D. degrees respectively. She was a primary school teacher and college lecturer in teacher education, and is the director of her own business, "FHE Education and Training Providers".

During the 2018 referendum to remove the constitutional prohibition of abortion, Healy Eames set up an anti-abortion website to advocate adoption as an option in crisis pregnancies. Healy Eames is herself an adoptive parent of two.

== Political career ==
=== Local representation ===
Healy Eames was first elected to Galway County Council, for the Oranmore electoral area, and served there from 2004 to 2007. Her various appointments as a Galway County Councillor (2004–2007) included: Chairperson of County Galway Vocational Education Committee (VEC); member of Governing Body, Galway-Mayo Institute of Technology (GMIT), member of HSE West Regional Forum, director of Galway Airport, member of Galway City and County Enterprise Board, member of Western Rail Committee and member of Galway Arts Centre Board.

=== General election results ===
She was an unsuccessful candidate at the 2002, 2007, 2011, and 2016 general elections for the Galway West constituency. In the 2016 general election, she received 2.17% of the first preference vote, down from the 8.3% she had received in the 2011 election.

=== Senator ===
She was elected as a Senator by sitting TDs and councilors in 2007, and appointed the Fine Gael Seanad (senate) spokesperson on Education and Science. In 2011, she was appointed the Fine Gael Seanad Spokesperson on Social Protection and member of the Joint Oireachtas Committee on European Affairs and the Joint Oireachtas Committee on Education and Science. Healy Eames was the Fine Gael Seanad Spokesperson on Social Protection until July 2013, when was expelled from the Fine Gael parliamentary party after defying the party whip by voting against the Protection of Life During Pregnancy Bill 2013. On 13 September 2013, she and six other expellees formed the Reform Alliance, described as a "loose alliance" rather than a political party.

In July 2015, during a Seanad debate on a bill to curb online freedom of speech, Healy Eames referred to a "wiffycode" (meaning a Wi-Fi hotspot password). A clip of this and the accompanying hashtag "#wiffycode" went viral, and a parody mix was released by radio station Spin 1038. She later stated that she had been using the French pronunciation of Wi-Fi.

In March 2016, she announced her intention not to contest the 2016 Seanad election, and plan to resign from politics.

=== 2019 European Parliament election ===
In May 2019 Healy Eames was an independent candidate in the Midlands–North-West for the 2019 European Parliament election. She received 15,991 (2.7%) first preference votes and was not elected.

== Controversies ==
A car belonging to Healy Eames was seized in Galway city on 2 July 2012 for failure to display a valid car disc. She told the Galway Advertiser: "I was using public transport up and down to Dublin and I had neglected the car tax. There is no excuse. I was completely in the wrong".

She was then fined for boarding the Galway to Dublin train without a ticket on 12 July 2012, ten days after her car was seized. A fellow passenger alleged that Healy Eames said "she is a Senator and that she makes the law" when an inspector asked her to produce her ticket. She was convicted and fined €1,850 for the motor tax offence.

Later that month, on 26 July, Galway Circuit Civil Court ordered the husband of Healy Eames to pay more than €12,000 in unpaid fees to a tradesman employed to carry out renovations at the Healy Eames residence in County Galway. The tradesman had launched a lawsuit in 2010 against the Healy Eameses for thousands of euros in unpaid fees.

The following month, on 20 August, she was involved in controversy over her decision to charge a state agency the cost of a plane ticket for her husband to accompany her on a hotel break to Kenya. When this was reported in Irish media, she said she would pay back the money within "a couple of weeks".

In March 2015, she attracted press attention for a tweet in which she claimed that were Ireland to legally recognise same-sex marriage, it could mean an end to the celebration of Mothers Day in the country. As evidence, she claimed that various U.S. states had banned Mothers Day and Fathers Day, referring to it as "political correctness gone mad". When critics pointed out that her claim regarding U.S. states was untrue, she retracted that statement, commenting that she meant to refer to a number of U.S. schools. In defending her comments, Healy Eames cited as her source Rense.com, a website run by Jeff Rense, a conspiracy theorist known for Holocaust denial, and criticised by the Anti-Defamation League. Critics in the Yes campaign accused her of employing scare tactics ahead of the May 2015 referendum on the issue.
