= Health Service Executive ransomware attack =

2021 cyber attack on the Health Service Executive in Ireland

- Date: 14 May 2021
- Location: Ireland
- Type: Cyberattack, data breach, ransomware using Conti
- Target: Health Service Executive (HSE); Department of Health
- Outcome: All HSE IT systems shutdown; Hospital disruptions and appointment cancellations; Department of Health IT systems shutdown; Medical data breach; Employee record data breach; Child and Family Agency computer (NCCIS) systems shutdown
- Suspects: Wizard Spider, ContiLocker Team

On 14 May 2021, the Health Service Executive (HSE) of Ireland suffered a major ransomware cyberattack which caused all of its IT systems nationwide to be shut down.

It was the most significant cybercrime attack on an Irish state agency and the largest known attack against a health service computer system. Bloomberg News reported that the attackers used the Conti ransomware. The group responsible was identified as a criminal gang known as Wizard Spider, believed to be operating from Russia. The same group is believed to have attacked the Department of Health with a similar cyberattack.

On 19 May, the Financial Times reviewed private data for twelve individuals which had appeared online as a result of the breach. On 28 May, the HSE confirmed confidential medical information for 520 patients, as well as corporate documents were published online.

== Background ==
The attackers began by sending a malicious email to a workstation on 16 March 2021. The email was opened on 18 March. A malicious Microsoft Excel file was downloaded, which allowed the attackers access to HSE systems. The attackers gained more access over the following weeks. The HSE antivirus software detected activity on 31 March, but could not block it as it was set to monitor mode.

On 13 May the cybersecurity provider for the HSE emailed the Security Operations team that there had been unhandled threats on at least 16 systems since 7 May. The Security Operations team had the server team restart servers.

The HSE was alerted to the attack at 4am on 14 May 2021. The attack affected both national and local systems, involved in all core services, with the HSE taking down their IT system in order to protect it from the attack and to give the HSE time to consider options.

The attack occurred during the COVID-19 pandemic. Ireland's COVID-19 vaccination programme was not affected by the attack and proceeded as planned; however, the COVID-19 general practitioner and close contact referral system was down, requiring these individuals to attend walk-in sites rather than attend an appointment.

The independent TD (Member of Parliament) Cathal Berry stated that the National Cyber Security Centre which is responsible for the state's cyber security, had only 25 members of staff, a budget of €5 million a year, no dedicated premises, and that its position of Director had been vacant for a year due to its salary of €89,000 a year. The National Cyber Security Centre was then under the remit of the Department of the Environment, Climate and Communications. Since 2025, it has been under the remit of the Department of Justice, Home Affairs and Migration.

== Perpetrator & methodology ==
The National Cyber Security Centre identified the penetration testing tool Cobalt Strike, sold by American IT company HelpSystems, as being used to move through and infect HSE and Department of Health systems, to run executable files, and to deploy a variant of the Conti ransomware. Cobalt Strike Beacon was detected on infected systems, which allowed them to be controlled and for software to be deployed remotely.

The group responsible was identified as a criminal gang known as Wizard Spider, believed to be operating from Saint Petersburg, Russia.

== Impact ==
=== Hospitals ===
The ransomware cyber attack had a significant impact on hospital appointments across the country, with many appointments cancelled including all outpatient and radiology services.

Several hospitals described situations where they could not access electronic systems and records and had to rely on paper records. Some have warned of significant disruption with routine appointments being cancelled, including maternity checkups and scans.

The COVID-19 testing referral system was made offline, requiring individuals with suspected cases to attend walk-in COVID-19 testing centres, rather than attend an appointment. The COVID-19 vaccination registration portal was also made offline, but was later back online in the evening.

The Chief Operations Officer of the HSE – Anne O'Connor – said on 14 May that some cancer and stroke services had been affected and that "the situation will be very serious if it continues into Monday [17 May]". She said that the most serious concerns were with diagnostics, with radiology systems having gone down, affecting CT and other scans from going ahead. A large amount of out-patient appointments were also cancelled; most community health services are unaffected. O'Connor also reported that "we don't know what data has been taken", but "we know some data has been compromised", with the Data Protection Commissioner being alerted to the potential breach.

The HSE published a list of affected services on its website at lunchtime on 14 May 2021.

On 19 May, the Financial Times reviewed "samples" of private data of twelve individuals that was published online, including admission records and laboratory results for a man admitted to hospital for palliative care. In response, the National Cyber Security Centre stated criminal gangs "habitually release stolen information as a means of pressurising organisations into paying a ransom". The ContiLocker Team claimed to also have staff employment contracts, payroll data and financial statements, patient addresses, and patient phone numbers.

On 28 May, the HSE confirmed that data relating to 520 patients, including sensitive information, was published online.

=== Hospital disruptions ===
Hospital disruptions by county
| County | Hospital |
|---|---|
| Kilkenny | St. Luke's General Hospital |
| Cavan | Cavan General Hospital |
| Clare | Ennis General Hospital |
| Cork | Cork University Hospital; Cork University Maternity Hospital |
| Donegal | Letterkenny University Hospital |
| Dublin | Beaumont Hospital; Children's Health Ireland at Crumlin; Coombe Hospital; National Maternity Hospital; Rotunda Hospital; Royal Victoria Eye and Ear Hospital; St. Columcille's Hospital; St. James's Hospital; St. Luke's Hospital; Children's Health Ireland at Temple Street; Tallaght University Hospital |
| Galway | University Hospital Galway; Merlin Park University Hospital; Portiuncula University Hospital |
| Kerry | University Hospital Kerry |
| Kildare | Naas General Hospital |
| Kilkenny | Kilcreene Orthopaedic Hospital |
| Laois | Midland Regional Hospital, Portlaoise |
| Limerick | University Hospital Limerick; St. John's Hospital, Limerick; University Maternity Hospital, Limerick; Croom Hospital |
| Louth | Louth County Hospital; Our Lady of Lourdes Hospital, Drogheda |
| Mayo | Mayo University Hospital |
| Meath | Our Lady's Hospital, Navan |
| Monaghan | Monaghan Hospital |
| Offaly | Midland Regional Hospital, Tullamore |
| Roscommon | Roscommon University Hospital |
| Sligo | Sligo University Hospital |
| Tipperary | South Tipperary General Hospital; Nenagh Hospital |
| Waterford | University Hospital Waterford |
| Westmeath | Regional Hospital Mullingar |
| Wexford | Wexford General Hospital |

In December 2021 the HSE said that it may take up to four months to contact all those whose data was stolen. The Garda National Cyber Crime Bureau received the data from the United States Department of Justice through a mutual legal assistance treaty. The Bureau provided the data to the HSE on 17 December 2021. The HSE confirmed that said data was taken from its computers. The HSE also contacted the Data Protection Commissioner about the data. The data is expected to be a mix of personal data, medical information, HSE corporate information as well as commercial and general personal administrative information.

=== Child and Family Agency ===
The Child and Family Agency - also known as Tusla - was also affected by the attack. Then CEO Bernard Gloster said that Tusla had about 20,000 open cases, including children in care, childwelfare and protection but that the records were on the National Childcare Information System (NCCIS) and that was not accessible due to the attack. He said that there was no indication that the data was compromised other than being made inaccessible, but that would not be known for certain until the HSE systems were restored. About 90% of Tuslas' connectivity was gone, with databases and operating systems affected.

== Response ==
The HSE worked with the National Cyber Security Centre, the Garda Síochána, Irish Defence Forces, as well as various partners domestically and internationally, including Europol and Interpol.

The Minister of State for Public Procurement and eGovernment – Ossian Smyth – said that the attack was international, not espionage, and that "this is a very significant attack, possibly the most significant cyber attack on the Irish State."

The HSE claimed that it was a zero-day-threat and that there was no experience in how to respond to the attack. The Minister for Health – Stephen Donnelly – said that the attack had "a severe impact" on health and social care services. The Director-General of the HSE – Paul Reid – said that the attack will cost "tens of millions" to fix.

A number of news outlets, including Bleeping Computer, reported that a ransom demand of €16.5 million was made, offering to decrypt data and to not publish "private data". Initially, the Business Post reported that a ransom demand of three bitcoin or €124,000 was made. Taoiseach Micheál Martin stated the ransom would not be paid, with the attack instead being dealt with in a "methodical way".

American cybersecurity firms McAfee and FireEye were contracted by the HSE after the attack to mitigate the damage, and to monitor dark web sites for leaked data.

On 16 May, it was reported that the Department of Social Protection came under "sustained and fierce attack" but the highly organised criminal group were unable to breach the security. The department subsequently suspended its electronic communication channels with the HSE.

On 20 May, Minister for Communications Eamon Ryan said a helpline was to be set up to assist individuals who have had health information published as a result of the hack, and that social media companies were asked to not share information that has been released, with a High Court injunction obtained by the HSE to prohibit the sharing of this information. On the same day, it was reported that the organised cyber crime group provided a decryption key that could enable the HSE to recover their IT systems and the files that hackers locked and encrypted. Meanwhile, the public was advised by Gardaí to be aware of a number of call and text scams in the wake of the cyber attack amid warnings the delivery of care in the health service would be a high risk for weeks; as of 24 May, the Garda Síochána have described any calls threatening the release of information as "opportunistic", stating they do not have access to private data.

On 27 May, the Chief Executive of the HSE – Paul Reid – said that the cost of the cyber attack on its IT systems could exceed €100 million.

The Defence Forces' CIS Corps deployed 'ethical hackers' to fight back against the ransomware attack and sent CIS personnel to hospitals and HSE offices in order to decrypt devices affected onsite. Army Reservists were particularly useful to this effort due to their cybersecurity skills and experienced gleaned from the private sector during their day jobs.

On 5 September, during a major operation carried out by Gardaí targeting the gang behind the ransomware attack, the Garda National Cyber Crime Bureau seized several domains used in the cyberattack and other ransomware attacks.

=== PricewaterhouseCoopers report ===
On 10 December a report by PricewaterhouseCoopers was released which revealed that the attackers were in the HSE computer systems eight weeks before the attack was initiated. The report said that the HSE legacy IT system was not resilient against cyberattacks. It had evolved over time but had not been designed to resist attacks.

HSE CEO Paul Reid said that the system had not been strategically designed, but was the result of amalgamation of health boards, hospital groups and Community Healthcare Organisations. The system is very fragmented and siloed. In contrast, the HSE staff were described as resilient, working quickly to ensure continuity of services. Reid also said that the HSE has initiated a number of actions to mitigate future attacks. These include a 24-hour monitoring system for IT systems in the HSE and more multi-factor authentication for users.

HSE chairman Ciarán Devine said that the heath service still feels the impact of the attack.

The HSE has accepted a number of recommendations from the report, including the development of a significant new investment plan and transforming legacy IT to include security.

New roles of Chief Technology and Transformation Officer and Chief Information Security Officer are to be created.

The report also recommends security crisis management plans to ensure that responses to futures attacks are properly managed.

The use of ethical hackers to test system security will be increased.

== Department of Health cyberattack ==
On 13 May, the National Cyber Security Centre (NCSC) was alerted of "suspicious activity" on Department of Health systems, and in the morning of 14 May an attempt to run ransomware was prevented, with Department of Health IT systems shut down as a precaution. A preliminary investigation by the NCSC showed the use of remote access tool Cobalt Strike, sold by American technology company HelpSystems, to infect systems and execute the ransomware payload.

According to RTÉ News, a digital note from the cyber crime group believed to be responsible was left on the Department's IT systems, similar to the one discovered at the HSE.

== Restoration of systems ==
On 23 June 2021, it was confirmed that at least three quarters of the HSE's IT servers had been decrypted and 70% of computer devices were back in use. By 15 July, this had risen to 82% of servers and 83% of devices. By September, over 95% of all servers and devices had been restored.

== Legal action ==
On 25 June 2021, High Court judge Tony O'Connor was told that approximately 27 files stolen from the HSE were placed on a malware analysis service VirusTotal in late May. VirusTotal is owned and run by Chronicle Security Ireland Ltd, its US parent Chronicle LLC and ultimately Google. The stolen files included confidential patient information and was downloaded 23 times before the files were removed on 25 May.

The defendants – Chronicle Security Ireland and Chronicle LLC – said they wanted to help the HSE as much as possible, but for data protection reasons cannot hand material over unless a court orders them. Therefore, the HSE sought Norwich Pharmacal orders against the defendants to require them to provide information on those who uploaded or downloaded the stolen information. The orders would require the defendants to supply the HSE with the unknown users' email addresses, phone numbers, IP addresses or physical addresses.

The HSE's national director for operation performance and integration – Joe Ryan – said the HSE became aware that the Financial Times had published an article referring to stolen data and mentioning a link to stolen data. The HSE sought the return of the stolen data and an explanation to the link location but the Financial Times indicated it had received the information from a confidential source which they refused to reveal.

On 20 May 2021, the HSE had obtained a court order restraining any processing, publishing, sharing or selling of stolen data. When the Financial Times received a copy of the order, they handed over the information they got from the source to the HSE computer security advisers. Analysis of this material revealed that the stolen data had been uploaded to VirusTotal.

Ryan said that after they were contacted, the defendants deleted the stolen data from their servers.

Counsel for the HSE told the judge that the matter was urgent but hoped that the matter could be finalised when the matter next comes before the court. The defendant's lawyers said they were unlikely to oppose any order in an agreed form from the HSE to disclose information. The judge, on an ex parte basis, granted counsel permission to serve short notice of the proceedings on the defendants and resumed the matter the following week.

== Notification of affected people ==
On 9 February 2023, it was revealed that over 32,000 notification letters were issued to people who had their data stolen in the cyber attack. More than 100,000 letters are to be sent to people affected by the attack by April 2023. Dáil Éireann's Public Accounts Committee examined the financial impact and heard that the immediate response cost the Department of Health €1 million and cost the HSE €53 million.

== Impact on cancer treatment ==
A research team led by Prof Seamus O'Reilly of Cork University Hospital found that in ten cancer trials units (three private, seven public) only two privately run units had a preparedness plan in place before the attack. Three of the remaining sites have implemented a plan or are doing so, while five did not have a plan.

The report also found that patient referrals to cancer clinical trials fell by 85 percent and trial recruitment fell by 55 percent.

513 patients around Ireland had their radiation therapy interrupted.

The attack came at the end of the third wave of COVID-19 and 'severely challenged the resilience of the already exhausted staff'.

Professor O'Reilly said "Covid-19 as an oncologist made me do things professionally that I don’t want to do again. But the cyber-attack was worse than Covid" to the Policy Forum for Ireland keynote seminar ‘Next steps for cancer services in Ireland’. He also said "It was a very difficult time. Results were frozen on the computer. Our ways of communicating with people were compromised, and we had no access to old information. We had patients who had scans done and the scans were trapped on the machine. It was very challenging for patients because they would turn up at clinics and there would be no records of them coming there or needing to be there. We would have had to send patients home to their GP to get their medical record details, get them printed out at their GP’s office and bring them back to us so we could look after them at the hospital."

He said that the HSE had improved cybersecurity but warned against complacency. He said "I think cyber-attacks are becoming more common and more sophisticated, so we’re still vulnerable to them, we’re probably more vulnerable now than we were in May of 2021. A cyber-attack now takes less than 24 hours to activate. the one we had in May 2021; it was embedding for two months. I think we we’re always going to be vulnerable to a cyber-attack. Systems have become more sophisticated to get around whatever we do."

== Legal actions ==
In May 2024 473 legal actions were reported to have been taken against the HSE in relation to the attack. The State Claims Agency is managing 12 personal injury cases against the HSE in relation to the attack, where legal proceedings were being served in 11 cases. The personal injury cases are related to the psychological impact of the attack. There are a number of cases before the Court of Justice of the European Union related to the attack.

=== HSE offer of compensation ===
In December 2025 the HSE offered €750 compensation to patients affected by the ransomware attack. The offer was received by O'Dowd Solicitors on 5 December 2025 and who described it as a "significant development" and that it is "the first time in public (or private that I know of) the HSE have acknowledged that they will need to compensate individuals impacted by the breach". The offer also includes a sum of €650 to cover legal costs.

The HSE said that of November 2025, there were around 620 legal cases against the HSE arising from the cyberattack.

== See also ==
- Colonial Pipeline cyberattack
- WannaCry ransomware attack – which affected the National Health Service (NHS) in the United Kingdom
- Waikato District Health Board cyberattack
- 2026 Belgian hospital cyberattack
