= List of medical libraries =

A health or medical library is designed to assist physicians, health professionals, students, patients, consumers, medical researchers, and information specialists in finding health and scientific information to improve, update, assess, or evaluate health care.

== Medical libraries: Africa ==
=== Algeria ===
- CERIST Centre de Recherche sur l‟Information Scientifique et Technique Digital Library

=== Benin ===
- John Harris Libraries, University of Benin

=== Botswana ===
- University of Botswana Library

=== Burkina Faso ===
- Groupe de Recherche Action en Sante (GRAS) library

=== Burundi ===
- Medical Library, Bujumbura University Hospital Center, Kamenge
- Vivian A. Dake Memorial Library, Hope Africa University

=== Cameroon ===
- Catholic School of Health Sciences, Shisong , Cameroon

=== Ghana ===
- Academic Library, Accra College of Medicine (ACM), Ghana
- University of Health and Allied Sciences (UHAS) , Volta Region, Ghana

=== Ivory Coast ===
- Bibliotheque UFR Sciences Medicales, University of F. Houphet Boigny de Cocody, Abidjan

=== Kenya ===
- Academic Library, Kenya Medical Training College, Nairobi
- Kenya Methodist University Library African Digital Health Library (ADHL) Kenya node
- Medical Library, University of Ibadan, Nairobi
- Research Library African Population and Health Research Center, Nairobi
- Research Library African Research and Resource Forum, Nairobi
- Research Library: African Medical and Research Foundation, Nairobi
- The Aga Khan University Faculty of Health Sciences Library, Dar es Salaam
- The Aga Khan University, Institute for Educational Development Library, Dar es Salaam
- The Aga Khan University, Faculty of Health Sciences Library, Kampala
- University of Nairobi African Digital Health Library (ADHL) Node

=== Libya ===
- Academic Library, Libyan International Medical University, Benghazi

=== Mali ===
- University of Science, Techniques and Technology of Bamako, Mali ADHL Node

=== Nigeria ===
- Barau Dikko Teaching Hospital, Medical Library, Kaduna State
- College of Health Science Library, Nnamdi Azikwe University, Enuga State
- Federal Medical Centre Library, Bauchi State
- Federal Medical Centre Library, Gombe State
- Federal Medical Centre Library, Katsina State
- Federal Medical Centre Library, Kebbi State
- Federal Medical Centre Library, Nasarawa State
- Federal Medical Centre Library, Ogun State
- Federal Medical Centre Library, Zamfara State
- Federal Ministry of Health Library, Lagos State
- Federal Neuro Psychiatric Hospital Library, Kaduna State
- Intercountry Centre for Oral Health (ICOH) Library, Plateau State
- Medical Library, Kaduna State
- Medical Library, Lagos State
- Medical Library, Ogun State
- Medical Library, Anambra State
- Medical Library, Benue State
- Medical Library, College of Medicine, Enuga
- Medical Library, Enugu State
- Medical Library, Imo State
- Medical Library, Kano State
- Medical Library, Kwara State
- Medical Library, Osun State
- National Agency for Food, Drug Administration and Control (NAFDAC) Library
- National Eye Centre Library
- National Hospital Library
- National Institute for Pharmaceutical Research and Development Library, Abuja State
- National Orthopaedic Hospital Library, Lagos State
- Neuropsychiatric Hospital Library, Ogun State
- Nigeria Institute of Medical Research Library, Lagos State
- Nigerian Institute for Tryponosomiasis Research (NITR) Library, Kaduna State
- University of Ibadan, Nigeria African Digital Health Library (ADHL) Node

=== Sierra Leone ===
- African Hospital libraries, Sierra Leone:
- Bo Government Hospital
- Department of Community Health, Fourah Bay College, Freetown (link-up library)
- Kenema Government Hospital
- Makeni Government Hospital
- Makeni School of Clinical Sciences (link-up library)
- PCMH/ODCH/COMAHS Library, Freetown (link-up library)

=== Seychelles ===
- NIHSS - National Institute of Health and Social Studies

=== South Africa ===
- AJ Orenstein Memorial Library, Spencer Lister Library, and Resource Centre (previously known as NICD library) at National Institute for Occupational Health
- Bongani Mayosi Health Sciences Library, Cape Town
- Health Sciences Library, University of Witwatersrand, Johannesberg
- Sefako Makgatho, Health Sciences University (SMU), Pretoria

=== Sudan ===
- University of Dongola - Library of the faculty of Medicine - Electronic Library Computer Department, Dongola
- University of Medical Sciences and Technology Library, Khartoum

=== Tanzania ===
- A3 School of Nursing Institution
- Aga Khan University
- Africa Medical and Research Foundation Tanzania
- Gataraye Research and Training Centre
- Government Chemist Laboratory Agency
- Hubert Kairuki Memorial University
- International Medical Technology University
- Lugalo Allied Health Training Institution
- Lugalo School of Nursing training Institution
- Massana School of Nursing
- Mikocheni School of Nursing Training Institution
- Ministry of Health and Social Welfare
- Mount Ukombozi Allied Health Training Institution
- Muhimbili School of Nursing Training Institution
- Muhimbili University of Health and Allied sciences Library, Dar es Salaam
- National Aids Control Programme
- National Institute for Medical Research
- Ocean Road Cancer Institute
- Paradigm Pharmacy Allied Training Institution
- Primary Health Care Institute Library
- Royal Pharmacy Training Institution
- St. Peters College of Health Science
- Tanzania Commission for AIDS
- Tanzania Food and Drug Authority
- Tanzania Food and Nutritional Centre
- WEILL Bugando University College Of Health Sciences, Bugando
- World Health Organization, Tanzania

=== Uganda ===
- Basajjabalaba Memorial Library, Kampala International University School of Health Sciences

*Busitema University School of Medicine Library

- Gulu University School of Medicine Library Referral Hospital
- Habib Medical School Library, Kibuli Hospital
- IHK Postgraduate Medical School Library
- Infectious Diseases Institute Library, Makerere University
- International Health Sciences University, Kampala
- Kabale University School of Medicine Library
- Mbarara University of Science and Technology Library (MUST Library)
- Mildmay Library and Resource Centre, Mildmay Institute of Health Sciences
- Ministry of Health Library
- Research Library Ernest Cook Ultrasound Research & Education Institute (ECUREI) Kampala
- Sir Albert Cook Library, Makerere University Library
- St. Augustine International University, College of Health, Medical & Life Sciences Library
- Uganda Christian University Library
- Uganda Institute of Allied Health & Management Sciences (UIAHMS-Mulago) Library
- Uganda Martyrs University Library
- WHO Library

=== World Health Organization ===
- WHO AFRO integrated African Health Observatory (iAHO)

=== Zambia ===
- Lusaka Apex Medical University Library, Lusaka
- Research Library Centre For Disease Research In Zambia , Lusaka
- University of Zambia African Digital Health Library (ADHL) Node

=== Zimbabwe ===
- University of Zimbabwe African Digital Health Library (ADHL) Node

== Medical libraries: Americas ==
=== Canada ===
- Dalhousie University (Halifax, Nova Scotia)
- Health Science Information Consortium of Toronto
- McGill University
- McMaster University
- Memorial University of Newfoundland
- University of Alberta
- University of British Columbia
- Children's/Women's Hospitals
- University of Calgary
- University of Manitoba
- University of Montreal
- CHU Sainte-Justine
- University of Ottawa
- University of Saskatchewan
- University of Toronto
- University of Western Ontario

=== United States ===
Alabama

- Alabama College of Osteopathic Medicine
- Edward Via College of Osteopathic Medicine-Auburn Campus
- University of Alabama/Birmingham
- University of South Alabama

Alaska

- Health Sciences Information Service, University of Alaska Anchorage

Arizona

- Arizona College of Osteopathic Medicine of Midwestern University
- Arizona Health Information Network
- A.T. Still University- School of Osteopathic Medicine in Arizona
- University of Arizona

Arkansas

- Arkansas Area Health Education Centers(AHECs)
- Arkansas College of Osteopathic Medicine
- New York Institute of Technology College of Osteopathic Medicine at Arkansas State University
- University of Arkansas for Medical Sciences

California

- California Health Sciences University College of Osteopathic Medicine
- California Pacific Medical Center/Univ Pacific School Of Dentistry (San Francisco)
- Cedars-Sinai Medical Center (West Hollywood)
- Drew University Of Medicine and Science
- Loma Linda University
- Lane Medical Library
- SAGE Medical Library (Santa Barbara Cottage Hospital)
- Stanford Hospital Health Library
- St. John's Regional Medical Center (Oxnard)
- St. Joseph Hospital (Orange)
- Touro University College of Osteopathic Medicine-California
- University Of California/Berkeley Optometry Library
- University Of California/Berkeley Public Health Library
- University Of California/Davis
- University Of California, Irvine, Grunigen Medical Library
- University Of California/Los Angeles
- University Of California/San Diego
- University Of California/San Francisco
- UCSF Mount Zion Medical Center
- University Of Southern California
- USC Wilson Dental Library
- USC Gerontology Center Library
- Western University of Health Sciences College of Osteopathic Medicine of the Pacific
- Medical Library Group Of Southern California & Arizona

Colorado

- AORN Library (Denver)
- Rocky Vista University College of Osteopathic Medicine
- University of Colorado Denver

Connecticut

- Edward and Barbara Netter Library, Quinnipiac University
- Hartford Hospital
- UConn Health, UConn Health Sciences Library
- Yale University, Cushing/Whitney Medical Library

Delaware

- Delaware Academy of Medicine

District Of Columbia

- Catholic University of America - Nursing/Biology Library
- George Washington University
- Georgetown University Medical Center
- Howard University
- Pan American Health Organization

Florida

- Burrell College of Osteopathic Medicine-Melbourne
- Florida International University
- Florida State University
- Lake Erie College of Osteopathic Medicine Bradenton Campus
- Nova Southeastern University Dr. Kiran C. Patel College of Osteopathic Medicine
- Nova Southeastern University Dr. Kiran C. Patel College of Osteopathic Medicine- Clearwater
- Nova Southeastern University Health Professions Division Library (Fort Lauderdale)
- Orlando College of Osteopathic Medicine
- University of Central Florida
- University of Florida/Gainesville
- University of Miami
- University of South Florida

Georgia

- Eisenhower Army Medical Center/SE Regional Medical Command (Fort Gordon)
- Emory University
- Georgia Health Sciences Library Association
- Mercer University
- Philadelphia College of Osteopathic Medicine - Georgia Campus
- Philadelphia College of Osteopathic Medicine South Georgia

Hawaii

- Hawaii Medical Library
- University of Hawaii (Manoa)

Idaho

- Idaho College of Osteopathic Medicine
- Idaho Health Sciences Library

Illinois

- American Dental Association
- Chicago College of Osteopathic Medicine of Midwestern University
- Health Science Librarians of Illinois
- Loyola University
- Northwestern University
- OSF Saint Francis Medical Center (Peoria)
- Rosalind Franklin University (Chicago)
- Rush University (Chicago)
- Southern Illinois University
- University of Chicago
- University of Illinois/Chicago
- University of Illinois/Peoria
- University of Illinois/Rockford
- University of Illinois/Urbana

Indiana

- Indiana University Medical Library
- Indiana University Dentistry Library
- Marian University College of Osteopathic Medicine
- Purdue University (Pharmacy, Nursing, Health Sciences)

Iowa

- Des Moines University
- Des Moines University College of Osteopathic Medicine
- University of Iowa Health Sciences Library
- University of Iowa Ophthalmology Library

Kansas

- Kansas Health Science Center- Kansas College of Osteopathic Medicine
- University Of Kansas (Kansas City)
- University of Kansas (Wichita)

Kentucky

- University of Kentucky
- University of Louisville
- University of Pikeville- Kentucky College of Osteopathic Medicine

Louisiana

- Edward Via College of Osteopathic Medicine- Louisiana Campus
- Ochsner Clinic Foundation (New Orleans)
- Louisiana State University Health Sciences Center/New Orleans
- Louisiana State University/Shreveport
- Tulane University Medical Library

Maine

- Health Science Libraries and Information Consortium of Maine
- Maine Medical Center
- University of New England College of Osteopathic Medicine

Maryland

- Johns Hopkins University
- NIH Library
- University of Maryland/Baltimore

Massachusetts

- Harvard Medical Web
- Countway Library of Medicine
- Massachusetts General Hospital
- New England College of Optometry
- South Coast Health System (New Bedford)
- Tufts University
- University of Massachusetts

Michigan

- Botsford General Hospital (Farmington Hills)
- Henry Ford Health System (Detroit)
- Michigan State University College of Osteopathic Medicine
- Michigan State University College of Osteopathic Medicine- Clinton Township
- Michigan State University College of Osteopathic Medicine- Detroit
- Providence Hospital (Southfield)
- Synergy Medical Education Alliance (Saginaw)
- University of Michigan
- Wayne State University
- Metropolitan Detroit Medical Library Group

Minnesota

- Allina Health System (Minneapolis)
- Mayo Clinic (Rochester)
- University of Minnesota

Mississippi

- University of Mississippi
- William Carey University College of Osteopathic Medicine

Missouri

- A.T. Still University- Kirksville College of Osteopathic Medicine
- Kansas City University College of Osteopathic Medicine
- Kansas City University College of Osteopathic Medicine- Joplin
- Saint Louis University
- University of Missouri
- University of Missouri/Kansas City
- Washington University

Montana

- Montana College of Osteopathic Medicine
- Touro College of Osteopathic Medicine- Montana

Nebraska

- University of Nebraska
- Creighton University

Nevada

- Touro University Nevada College of Osteopathic Medicine
- University of Nevada

New Hampshire

- Dartmouth

New Jersey

- Medical Center at Princeton
- Monmouth Medical Center (Long Branch)
- Rowan-Virtua School of Osteopathic Medicine
- Rowan-Virtua School of Osteopathic Medicine Sewell Campus
- St. Peters Medical Center (New Brunswick)
- University of Medicine and Dentistry of New Jersey

New Mexico

- Burrell College of Osteopathic Medicine

New York

- Albany Medical College
- Albert Einstein College of Medicine
- Columbia University
- Columbia University Health Sciences Library
- Cornell University
- Kaleida Health Libraries (Buffalo)
- Lake Erie College of Osteopathic Medicine- Elmira
- Mount Sinai
- New York Academy of Medicine
- New York Dept of Health (Albany)
- New York Institute of Technology College of Osteopathic Medicine
- New York Medical College
- New York Methodist Hospital (Brooklyn)
- New York University
- Rockefeller University
- St. Luke's Cornwall Hospital (Newburgh)
- State University of New York/Buffalo
- State University of New York/New York (College of Optometry Vision Science Library)
- State University of New York/Stony Brook
- State University of New York/Upstate-Syracuse
- Touro College of Osteopathic Medicine- Harlem
- Touro College of Osteopathic Medicine- Middletown
- University of Rochester
- Winthrop University Hospital (Mineola)

North Carolina

- Campbell University Jerry M. Wallace School of Osteopathic Medicine
- Duke University
- East Carolina University
- National Institute of Environmental Health Sciences (NIH)
- University of North Carolina at Chapel Hill
- Wake Forest University

North Dakota

- University of North Dakota

Ohio

- Cleveland Health Sciences Library, Case Western Reserve
- Northeast Ohio Medical University
- Ohio State University
- Ohio University Heritage College of Osteopathic Medicine
- Ohio University Heritage College of Osteopathic Medicine- Cleveland
- Ohio University Heritage College of Osteopathic Medicine- Dublin
- University of Cincinnati

Oklahoma

- Oklahoma State University Center for Health Sciences College of Osteopathic Medicine
- Oklahoma State University Center for Health Sciences College of Osteopathic Medicine- Tahlequah
- University of Oklahoma

Oregon

- Oregon Health Sciences University
- Samaritan Health
- Western University of Health Sciences College of Osteopathic Medicine of the Pacific- Northwest

Pennsylvania

- Drexel University (Philadelphia)
- Duquesne University College of Osteopathic Medicine
- Easton Hospital
- Fox Chase Cancer Center (Philadelphia)
- Lake Erie College of Osteopathic Medicine
- Lake Erie College of Osteopathic Medicine- Seton Hill
- Pennsylvania State University (Hershey Medical Center)
- Philadelphia College of Osteopathic Medicine
- Thomas Jefferson University
- University of Pennsylvania
- University of Pittsburgh Health Sciences Library System

South Carolina

- Edward Via College of Osteopathic Medicine- Carolinas Campus
- Medical University of South Carolina
- University of South Carolina

South Dakota

- University of South Dakota

Tennessee

- Baptist Health Sciences University College of Osteopathic Medicine
- East Tennessee State University
- Lincoln Memorial University - DeBusk College of Osteopathic Medicine
- Lincoln Memorial University- DeBusk College of Osteopathic Medicine- Knoxville
- St. Jude Children’s Research Hospital (Memphis)
- University of Tennessee Medical Center, Knoxville
- University of Tennessee, Memphis
- Vanderbilt University (library)

Texas

- Baylor Health Sciences Library
- Houston Academy of Medicine-Texas Medical Center
- Sam Houston State University College of Osteopathic Medicine
- Texas A&M University
- Texas Dept of State Health Services (Austin)
- Texas Tech University Health Sciences Center
- University of the Incarnate Word School of Osteopathic Medicine
- University of North Texas Health Sciences Center
- University of North Texas Health Science Center at Fort Worth- Texas College of Osteopathic Medicine
- University of Texas Health Center at San Antonio
- University of Texas Health Center, Tyler
- University of Texas M.D. Anderson Cancer Center, Research Medical Library
- University of Texas Medical Branch, Galveston
- University of Texas Southwestern Medical Center

Utah

- Noorda College of Osteopathic Medicine
- Rocky Vista University College of Osteopathic Medicine-Southern Utah Campus
- University of Utah

Vermont

- University of Vermont

Virginia

- Appalachian College of Pharmacy
- Eastern Virginia
- Edward Via College of Osteopathic Medicine- Virginia Campus
- Liberty University College of Osteopathic Medicine
- University of Virginia
- Virginia Commonwealth

Washington

- Overlake Hospital (Bellevue)
- Pacific Northwest University of Health Sciences College of Osteopathic Medicine
- University of Washington Health Sciences Library
- University of Washington Dept of Environmental Health
- Washington Medical Librarians Association

West Virginia

- Marshall University
- West Virginia School of Osteopathic Medicine
- West Virginia University, Charleston Division

Wisconsin

- Medical College of Wisconsin
- St. Joseph Hospital/covenant Library System, Milwaukee
- University of Wisconsin

US Territories

- University of Puerto Rico

=== Caribbean ===
- University of the West Indies, St Augustine (Trinidad)
- American University of Antigua (West Indies)

== Medical libraries: Asia ==
=== China ===
- Chinese University of Hong Kong (China)

=== India ===
- All India Institute of Medical Sciences (AIIMS), Patna, Bihar

=== Israel ===
- Hebrew University (Israel)

=== Malaysia ===
- Kuala Lumpur Hospital (Malaysia)

=== Kuwait ===
- Kuwait University

=== United Arab Emirates ===
- Rashid Medical Library (United Arab Emirates)

== Medical libraries: Europe ==
=== Bulgaria ===
- Medical University of Sofia Central Medical Library (Bulgaria)

=== Croatia ===
- Zagreb University (Croatia)

=== Finland ===
- TerKko – National Library of Health Sciences (Finland)
- Helsinki University – Dental Library

=== France ===
- List of French Medical libraries, from Rouen University Hospital Medical Library

=== Germany ===
- Medizinische Bibliothek der Charité - Universitätsmedizin Berlin
- German National Library of Medicine, Koeln
- Universitaats- und Landesbibliothek, Muenster, Zweigbibliothek der Medizin
- Saarlaandische Universitaats-und Landesbibliothek-Medizinische Abteilung, Homburg/Saar
- Universitaat Magdeburg, Medizinische Zentralbibliothek

=== Greece ===
- SBC institute (Athens, Greece)

=== Ireland ===
The group or branch of the Library Association of Ireland which represents the interests of those working in health and medical libraries in Ireland is the Health Sciences Libraries Group or HSLG.

Irish hospital libraries

- Library, Beaumont Hospital, Dublin
- Library, Mater Misericordiae University Hospital
- Library, Tallaght University Hospital
- Library, Irish College of General Practitioners (ICGP)
- Library, St. Vincent's Hospital, Fairview
- Library, St Vincent's University Hospital
- Library, Rotunda Hospital
- Library, Children's Health Ireland at Crumlin
- Library, Children's Health Ireland at Temple Street
- Library, South Infirmary-Victoria University Hospital, Cork
- Library, Mercy University Hospital
- Dementia Services Library, St James's Hospital, Rialto
- Health Library Ireland (Leabharlann Sláinte na hÉireann) (Health Library Ireland at the Health Service Executive, Dr Steeven’s Hospital, Dublin, Ireland incorporates libraries located in hospitals across Ireland and an e-library, listed below).
1. Adult Mental Health Services (AMHS) Library, Cork
2. Library, Bantry General Hospital, Cork
3. Library, Cavan General Hospital
4. Library, Cherry Orchard Hospital, Dublin
5. Library, Connolly Hospital, Blanchardstown, Dublin
6. Cork University Hospital Healthcare Library
7. Dr Steevens' Hospital Library, Dublin
8. Health Library Ireland (HLI) E-Library
9. Library Mallow General Hospital, Cork (currently closed)
10. Library, Mayo University Hospital
11. University Hospital Galway. Merlin Park Hospital Library and Galway University Hospital Library
12. Library, Midland Regional Hospital, Mullingar
13. Library, Midland Regional Hospital, Portlaoise, Co. Laois
14. Library, Midland Regional Hospital, Tullamore, Offaly
15. Library, Naas General Hospital
16. Library, Our Lady of Lourdes Hospital, Drogheda
17. Library, Our Lady's Hospital, Navan
18. Library, Portiuncula University Hospital, Galway
19. Library, Roscommon University Hospital
20. Library, Sligo University Hospital
21. Library, Tipperary University Hospital
22. Library, St. Columcille's Hospital, Loughlinstown, Co. Dublin
23. Library, St Conal's Hospital, Letterkenny, Co. Donegal
24. Library, St. Luke's General Hospital
25. Library, St. Luke’s Radiation Oncology Network (SLRON) Dublin
26. Library, University Hospital Kerry
27. Library, University Hospital Limerick
28. Medical Library, University Hospital Waterford
29. Medical Library, Wexford General Hospital

Irish specialist health libraries

- The Dun Library, Royal College of Physicians of Ireland (RCPI)
- Health Information and Quality Authority (HIQA)
- John Stearne Medical Library, St. James's Hospital Trinity College Dublin
- Library, Dublin Dental University Hospital
- Library, Food Safety Authority of Ireland (FSAI)
- Library, Health Products Regulatory Authority (HPRA)
- Library, Irish Blood Transfusion Service (IBTS)
- Library, Milford Care Centre
- Library, Our Lady's Hospice
- Library, Royal College of Surgeons of Ireland (RCSI): RCSI library, York Street; RCSI library, Beaumont Hospital; RCSI Heritage Collections
- Medical Library, Ollscoil na Gaillimhe University of Galway
- National Drugs Library, Health Research Board (HRB)
- Thérése Brady Library, Irish Hospice Foundation

=== The Netherlands ===
- Academic Hospital Groningen (The Netherlands)

=== Spain ===
- Hospital de Cruces (Bilbao, Spain)
- Hospital Ramon y Cajal Biblioteca (Madrid)

=== Sweden ===
- Karolinska Institutet University Library (Stockholm, Sweden)

=== United Kingdom ===
- Bedford Hospitals NHS Trust
- British Medical Association
- Cardiff University
- Health Libraries Group
- National Health Service (London)
- Royal College of Nursing
- South West Health Care
- Hope Hospital / University of Manchester

== Medical libraries: Oceania ==
=== Australia ===
- Canberra Hospital
- Flinders University/Medical Library (South Australia)
- Monash University/Biomedical Library (Victoria)
- Royal Victorian Eye and Ear Hospital/Royal Australian College of Ophthalmologists
- University of Melbourne-Biomedical Library
- University of New South Wales/Biomedical Library
- University of Queensland/Biological & Health Sciences Libraries
- University of Sydney
- Women's and Children Health (Melbourne)

=== New Zealand ===
- Te Whatu Ora Health New Zealand Library and Knowledge Service
- New Zealand Nurses Organisation Library
- Canterbury Medical Library, University of Otago
- Wellington Medical and Health Sciences Library, University of Otago
- Bay of Plenty Library at Tauranga Hospital and Whakatāne Hospital
- Ernest and Marion Davis Library, Auckland City Hospital
- Waikato Hospital Library
- Ministry of Health Manatu Hauora Library
- Ko Matakerepo learning centre — Tairāwhiti

== See also ==
- Lists of libraries
