= Carlow-Kilkenny Acute Hospitals =

Hospital network in County Kilkenny, Ireland

Carlow-Kilkenny Acute Hospitals was a hospital network in County Kilkenny, Ireland. It consisted of:

- Kilcreene Orthopaedic Hospital
- St. Luke's General Hospital

Both hospitals are now part of a revised hospital group structure, with Kilcreene Orthopaedic Hospital moving to the South-South West Hospital Group, and St. Luke's General Hospital moving to the Ireland East Hospital Group.

== See also ==
- List of hospitals in Ireland
