= Fatface =

Fatface may refer to:

- Fat Face, a British clothing retailer
- Fat face typefaces, a style of typeface popular in the nineteenth century
