= Saolta University Health Care Group =

Hospital group in ireland

The Saolta University Health Care Group (Irish: Grúpa Cúram Sláinte Ollscoile Saolta) is one of the hospital groups established by the Health Service Executive in Ireland.

== History ==
The grouping of hospitals was announced by Ireland's then Minister for Health, Dr. James Reilly, T.D., in May 2013, as part of a restructure of Irish public hospitals and a goal of delivering better patient care. The Group was given responsibility for the following hospitals:

- University Hospital Galway
- Letterkenny University Hospital
- Mayo University Hospital
- Merlin Park University Hospital
- Portiuncula University Hospital
- Roscommon University Hospital
- Sligo University Hospital

In 2014, the Group, which had initially been known as the West / North West Hospitals Group, became Saolta University Health Care Group.

In 2016 Bill Maher, Chief Executive of Saolta University Health Care Group, was the subject of an internal audit revealing potential conflict of interest at the time of his appointment leading to the award of contracts without tendering worth approximately €340,000 to Northgate, an organisation Maher held a consulting contract with at the same time. At the time he was also in receipt of top-up payments from St. Vincent's Healthcare Group, and an allowance for working in Galway.

== Services ==
The Group is headed by a Chief Executive, who is accountable to the National Director for Acute Services in the Health Service Executive, and is responsibility for delivering inpatient care, emergency care, maternity services, outpatient care and diagnostic services at its designated hospitals. The Group’s designated cancer centre is University Hospital Galway with a satellite centre in Letterkenny University Hospital. The Group's academic partner is NUI Galway.
