= Letterkenny University Hospital =

Coordinates: 54.956542°N 7.725474°W

- Health Service Executive
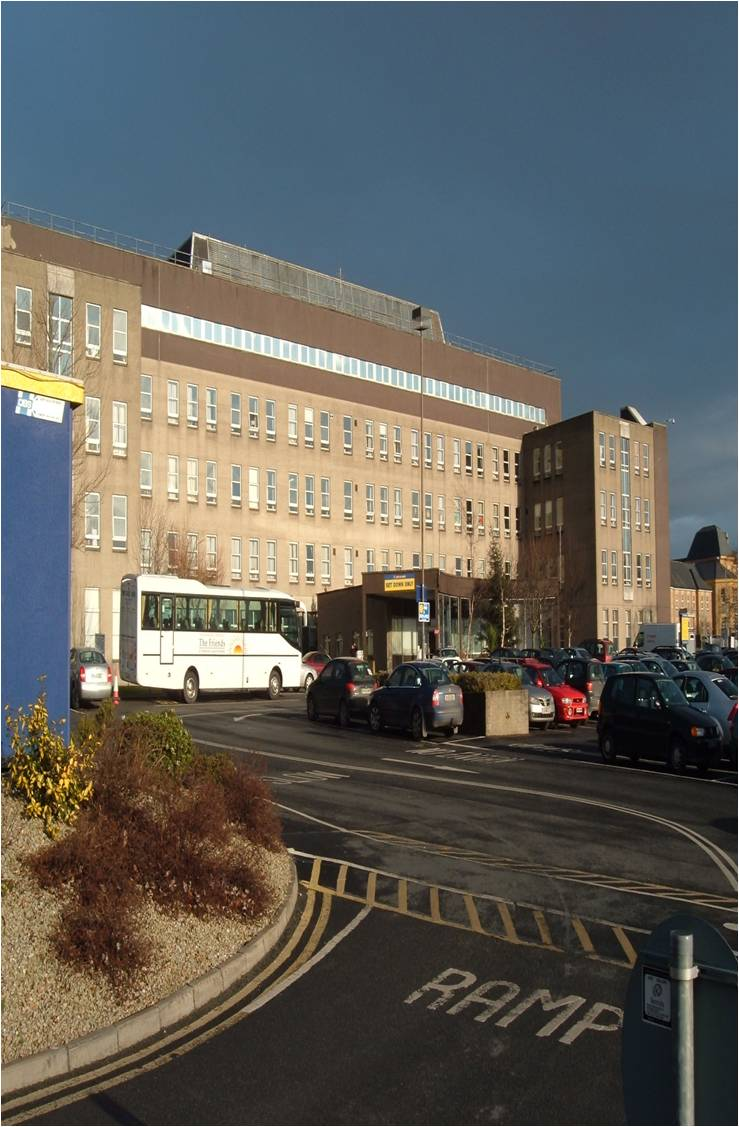
- Hospital building before the floods

- Shown in Ireland

Geography
- Location: Letterkenny, County Donegal, Ireland

Organisation
- Care system: HSE
- Type: University

Services
- Emergency department: Yes Accident & Emergency

History
- Founded: 1961

Links
- Website: www.hse.ie/eng/services/list/3/acutehospitals/hospitals/luh/
- Lists: Hospitals in the Republic of Ireland

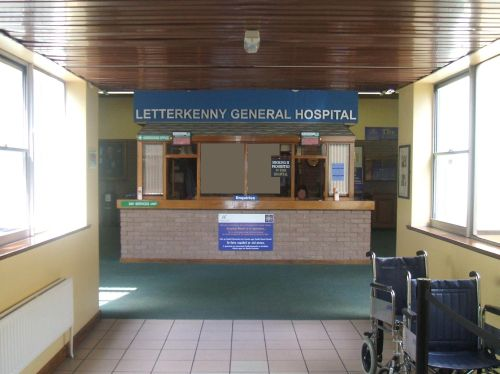
Reception desk area before the floods

Letterkenny University Hospital (Irish: Ospidéal na hOllscoile Leitir Ceanainn) is a general hospital at Letterkenny, County Donegal, Ireland. It is one of Ireland's busiest. The campus is divided by a main road heading towards the north and west of Donegal on the N56 road (Ireland). A teaching hospital, it maintains links with the University of Galway, ATU Letterkenny and the Royal College of Surgeons.

LUH has been affected by the problems faced by the HSE, from when it was introduced to the present day. A common feature is the treatment of patients on trolleys due to chronic bed shortages. The emergency department of the hospital was closed for nine months when it was destroyed by flooding in July 2013 which caused €40 million worth of damage. The hospital was closed once again due to flooding following heavy rainfall a year later, in August 2014. It is managed by Saolta University Health Care Group. The hospital changed its name from Letterkenny General Hospital to Letterkenny University Hospital in November 2015.

== History ==
=== Early history ===
The hospital has its origins in the Letterkenny Union Workhouse and Infirmary which was designed by George Wilkinson and opened in Kilmacrennan Road in 1844. This developed into the Letterkenny District Hospital. Letterkenny General Hospital was built on the same site and was opened by Seán MacEntee, the Tánaiste, in July 1961. A new multi-storey hospital block was built in 1981. Most of the facilities are housed in this building but some, such as the dental, ophthalmic and some mental health facilities, are housed across the road in St Conal's Hospital.

=== Treatment of Seamus Heaney ===
Seamus Heaney (recipient of the 1995 Nobel Prize in Literature) and his wife were driven here after Heaney had a stroke in 2006. Bill Clinton – who was in Ireland for the Ryder Cup in County Kildare (just west of Dublin and many hours south of Letterkenny) – heard about Heaney's "episode", as Heaney himself described it. "The next thing, [Clinton] put a call to the hospital, and said he was on his way. He strode into the ward like a kind of god". Heaney noted that Clinton took the time to introduce himself to and shake the hands of "my fellow sufferers, four or five men much more stricken than I was", who shared his ward, then Clinton "went round all the wards and gave the whole hospital a terrific boost. We had about 25 minutes with him, and talked about Ulysses Grant's memoirs, which he was reading." Clinton departed, heading straight to the airport.

=== Axe and knife incidents ===
On 14 July 2009, a gang of men entered the hospital, one of them brandishing an axe. He subsequently made his way to floor E where he barricaded himself into the staff room. Areas of the hospital were sealed off during the incident to prevent further movement. The man was later talked out by family members and staff and surrendered the axe. He was making his way to the intensive care unit to visit the husband of a deceased member of his family. He had taken a drug overdose after his wife died in a car crash. Another man entered the intensive care unit dressed as a priest with a knife hidden under his garments. He left the scene peacefully.

=== New emergency department ===
In November 2008, it was confirmed that work would begin on a new emergency department and medical wards at the hospital, of about 6,600 square metres. Construction began in January 2009, at a cost of approximately €22 million, and was expected to be completed in late 2010. The new facility was to provide three medical floors consisting of 72 beds, two-thirds of which were to be provided in single rooms. The new emergency department would have 19 treatment spaces, incorporate an 11-bed medical assessment unit and an x-ray room. The mortuary chapel would be moved from its current position to a new location during construction. Health Minister James Reilly finally opened the new unit in 2013.

=== Pandemic ===
In January 2021, amid the COVID-19 pandemic, delays at the hospital featured in international news when it was described as "briefly overwhelmed".

== Flooding ==
=== 2013 flooding ===
Following a heatwave across Ireland on 26 July 2013, a thunderstorm brought heavy rain, causing a nearby river to burst its banks. The resulting flood "completely destroyed" the new emergency department, flooded much of the ground and first floor of the hospital and led to the evacuation of patients. A state of emergency was declared. The flooding also destroyed the radiology department, outpatient department, pathology and medical records departments, kitchens and numerous wards.

Fire crews pumped out the floodwaters and off-duty staff rushed back to the hospital to help patients to safety and to try to save any medical files that had been untouched by the raw sewage that had flooded the hospital. Blame for the scale of the damage was laid on cutbacks at Donegal County Council which led to drains outside the hospital going uncleaned for seven months. As a result, the floodwaters had nowhere to go.

Hospital manager Sean Murphy said: "The speed with which it happened was incredible. We had an hour that changed the face of the hospital." All prospective patients were directed to hospitals in Sligo and Derry, which put extra strain on those hospitals, which were already struggling to cope with patients from their own counties.

In August 2013, nurses at the hospital were told they would have to travel to Derry, across the border in Northern Ireland, to help deal with the overflow of patients there. This created further bureaucratic problems as they were required to be registered to work in the United Kingdom. Also that month, the mobile kitchens used during the 39th G8 summit at Lough Erne were brought to the hospital, to deal with the problems arising from the destruction of the hospital's kitchens. All catering until then was delivered to the hospital by nearby hotels and restaurants.

As a result of the disaster, Ireland's fourth largest county was left without a functioning emergency department, with the nearest one in the state being two counties away in Sligo General Hospital. Seriously ill inhabitants were evacuated from the county by the coastguard helicopter, which was put on 24-hour standby. Parts of the hospital were expected to have to be demolished, further increasing the final cost of repairing the damaged hospital.

€40 million worth of damage was done to the hospital and it re-opened after nine months, in March 2014.

==== Response and re-occurrence ====
Taoiseach Enda Kenny remarked that the floods had "destroyed a first class medical facility" and called the damage "very substantial – records lost, MRI machine, diagnostics laboratory, walls to be stripped and decontaminated. It means, effectively, that Letterkenny General Hospital will be out of operation for a considerable time". He did not visit the hospital and was heavily criticised for not doing so. Fianna Fáil leader Micheál Martin, himself a former Minister for Health who had announced the new emergency department almost exactly ten years previously, visited the hospital on 31 July. Martin said: "The sheer scale of the devastation following last week's floods has to be seen to be believed. This level of damage is unprecedented for any Irish hospital in living memory, and there are serious implications for health service provision right across the North West."

On the same day as Martin's visit to the damaged hospital, junior health minister Kathleen Lynch came to see for herself. However, during her visit, she became ill and was the first and last person to be admitted to the hospital since the flood. Sinn Féin president Gerry Adams visited the hospital the following day.

Meanwhile, consultant oncologist and senator John Crown was critical of the lack of media interest in the events outside the area affected. He said online: "If [a] flood like Letterkenny Hosp[ital] flood had happened in [a] Dublin hospital [I] suspect it would have greater coverage."

The hospital was closed once again due to flooding following heavy rainfall on 5 August 2014, five months after re-opening. An investigation was begun into the reason for the flooding.

== Gallery ==
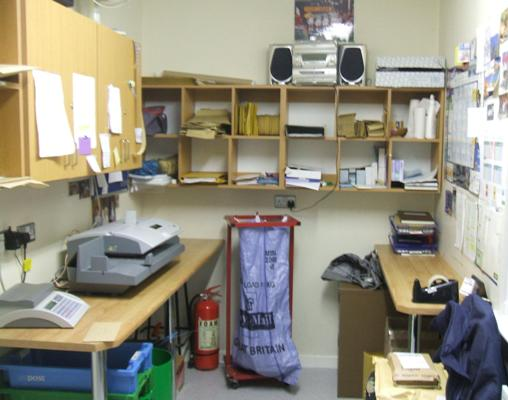
Post Department

Coffee dock

Day Services Unit waiting room

Department of Finance
