= Ireland East Hospital Group =

Hospital group in ireland

The Ireland East Hospital Group (Irish: Grúpa Ospidéal Oirthear na hÉireann) is one of the hospital groups established by the Health Service Executive in Ireland.

== History ==
The grouping of hospitals was announced by the Minister for Health, James Reilly, in May 2013, as part of a restructure of Irish public hospitals and a goal of delivering better patient care. The Group was given responsibility for the following hospitals:

Greater Dublin

- Mater Misericordiae University Hospital
- St. Vincent's University Hospital
- National Maternity Hospital
- Royal Victoria Eye and Ear Hospital
- St. Michael's Hospital, Dún Laoghaire
- Cappagh National Orthopaedic Hospital, Finglas
- St. Columcille's Hospital, Loughlinstown

Other eastern and midlands counties

- Our Lady's Hospital, Navan
- Midland Regional Hospital, Mullingar
- St. Luke's General Hospital, Kilkenny
- Wexford General Hospital

In July 2016, University College Dublin and Ireland East Hospital Group entered into a partnership to deliver improved cancer treatment.

== Services ==
The Group is headed by a Chief Executive, who is accountable to the National Director for Acute Services in the Health Service Executive, and is responsibility for delivering inpatient care, emergency care, maternity services, outpatient care and diagnostic services at its designated hospitals. The Group’s designated cancer centres are Mater Misericordiae University Hospital and St. Vincent’s University Hospital. The Group's academic partner is University College Dublin.
