= Emotet =

Cybercrime operation and malware strain

Emotet is a malware strain and a cybercrime operation believed to be based in Ukraine. The malware, also known as Heodo, was first detected in 2014 and deemed one of the most prevalent threats of the decade. In 2021, the servers used for Emotet were disrupted through global police action in Germany and Ukraine and brought under the control of law enforcement. Despite this disruption, Emotet resurfaced in subsequent years with new capabilities, continuing to be regarded as one of the Internet’s most persistent and adaptable threats.

First versions of the Emotet malware functioned as a banking trojan aimed at stealing banking credentials from infected hosts. Throughout 2016 and 2017, Emotet operators, sometimes known as Mealybug, updated the trojan and reconfigured it to work primarily as a "loader," a type of malware that gains access to a system, and then allows its operators to download additional payloads. Second-stage payloads can be any type of executable code, from Emotet's own modules to malware developed by other cybercrime gangs.

Initial infection of target systems often proceeds through a macro virus in an email attachment. The infected email is a legitimate-appearing reply to an earlier message that was sent by the victim.

It has been widely documented that the Emotet authors have used the malware to create a botnet of infected computers to which they sell access in an infrastructure as a service (IaaS) model, referred in the cybersecurity community as MaaS (malware as a service), cybercrime as a service (CaaS), or crimeware. Emotet is known for renting access to infected computers to ransomware operations, such as the Ryuk gang.

== History ==
In 2014, Emotet was first identified as a banking trojan designed to steal banking credentials from infected hosts. Within a year or two, the malware evolved into a more versatile and dangerous threat. It transformed into a loader, allowing operators to download additional malicious payloads onto infected systems, such as the TrickBot banking trojan and Ryuk ransomware.

As of September 2019, the Emotet operation ran on top of three separate botnets called Epoch 1, Epoch 2, and Epoch 3.

In mid-2020, Emotet re-emerged after a brief hiatus, launching widespread malspam campaigns targeting organizations globally. The U.S. Cybersecurity and Infrastructure Security Agency (CISA) reported over 16,000 Emotet-related alerts across federal networks between July and October. Emotet leveraged advanced evasion techniques, including polymorphic code, fileless persistence via PowerShell, lateral movement via nearby Wi-Fi networks, and email thread hijacking to increase the success of phishing attacks. Campaigns often used malicious Microsoft Word documents with filenames like "form.doc" or "invoice.doc" to deliver the initial payload via PowerShell scripts. Later in the year, Emotet operators also used parked domains to distribute malicious code.

In January 2021, international action coordinated by Europol and Eurojust allowed investigators to take control of and disrupt the Emotet infrastructure. The reported action was accompanied with arrests made in Ukraine.

On 14 November 2021, new Emotet samples emerged that were very similar to the previous bot code, but with a different encryption scheme that used elliptic curve cryptography for command and control communications. The new Emotet infections were delivered via TrickBot, to computers that were previously infected with TrickBot, and soon began sending malicious spam email messages with macro-laden Microsoft Word and Excel files as payloads.

On 2 November 2022, new samples of Emotet emerged attached as a part of XLS files attached within email messages.

In March 2023, Emotet resurfaced after a four-month hiatus with a new spam campaign. Emails spoofed known contacts, addressed recipients by name, and mimicked prior threads. Attached Word documents were inflated to over 500MB using binary padding and included hidden Moby-Dick excerpts to evade detection. If macros were enabled, the document downloaded a ZIP file from a compromised site and executed a large DLL. The malware harvested credentials, sent spam, and installed secondary payloads such as TrickBot or Ryuk. Targets included organizations in Europe, Asia-Pacific, and Latin America.

In late 2023, Microsoft and the U.S. National Institute of Standards and Technology (NIST) reported that attackers were using a Windows vulnerability to distribute malware, including Emotet. The technique involved phishing emails with malicious attachments that leveraged a Windows feature known as the App Installer. To reduce the risk of exploitation, Microsoft updated the software to disable the affected functionality by default.

== Noteworthy infections ==
- Allentown, Pennsylvania, city located in Pennsylvania, United States (2018)
- Heise Online, publishing house based in Hanover, Germany (2019)
- Kammergericht Berlin, the highest court of the state of Berlin, Germany (2019)
- Humboldt University of Berlin, university in Berlin, Germany (2019)
- Universität Gießen, university in Germany (2019)
- Department of Justice of the province of Quebec (2020)
- Lithuanian government (2020)
- Democratic National Committee, political organization in the United States (2020)
- Government entities in France, Japan, and New Zealand (2020)
