= FatFace =

Lifestyle clothing and accessories retailer, based in England

Fat Face Limited
- FatFace company wordmark
- Type: Clothing & Accessories
- Key people: Stuart Rose (Chairman); William Crumbie (Chief Executive)
- Products: Clothing; Footwear; Accessories
- Revenue: £160 million (2021)
- Owner: Next plc
- Website: fatface.com

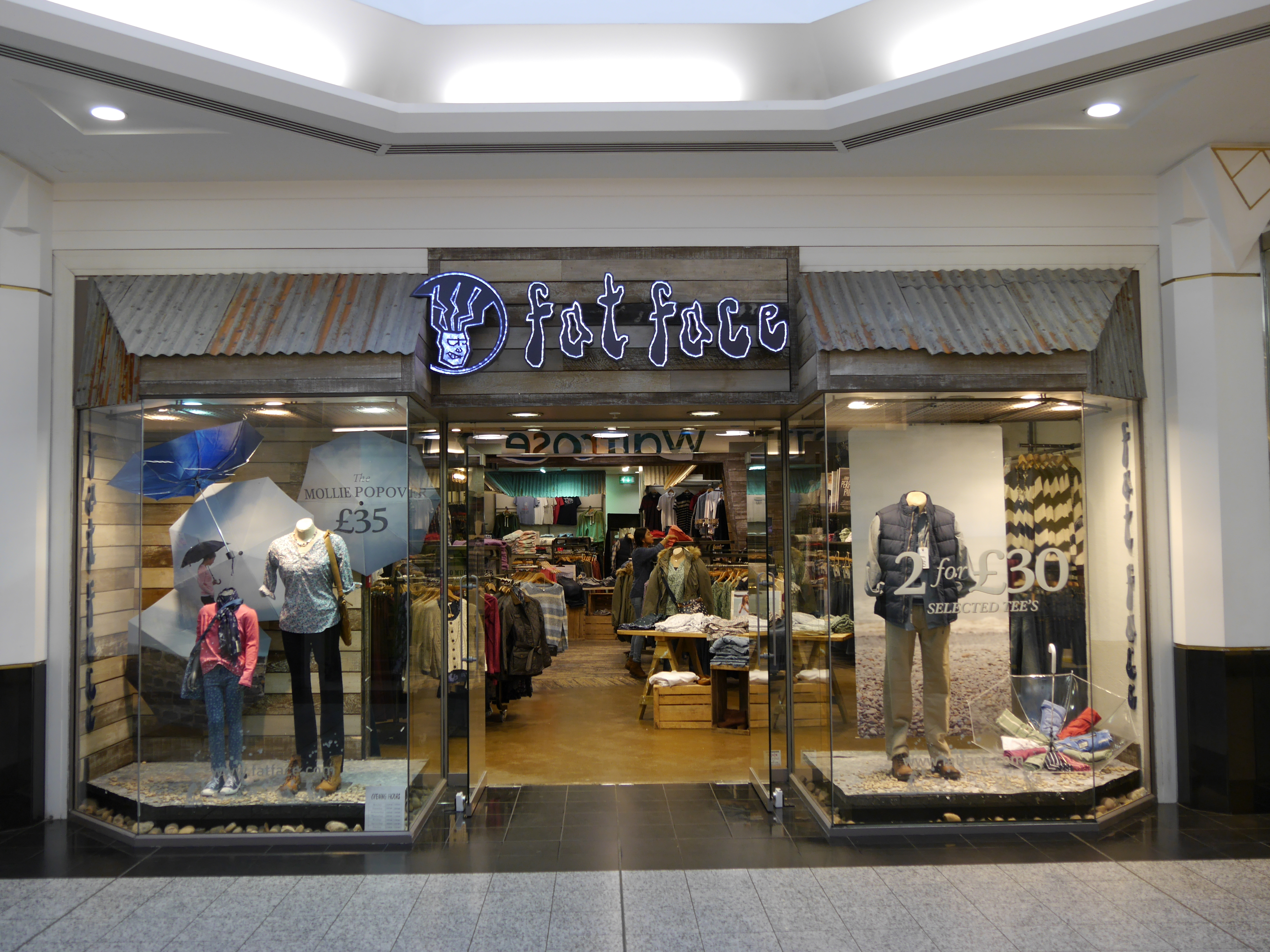
FatFace, Putney Exchange, London (now closed)

Fat Face Limited, trading as FatFace, is an English clothing retailer and lifestyle brand. FatFace is a multichannel retailer, with an international digital business, and over 180 stores in the UK and 20 stores in the US.

== History ==
The business was founded in 1988 in French ski resort Méribel by Tim Slade, a former policeman, and business graduate Jules Leaver. The pair bought T-shirts wholesale, had them printed with designs specific to the resort, and sold them to other skiers, at first using the proceeds only to fund their own skiing. They spent the following years travelling to different ski resorts, where they continued to produce and sell ski and outdoor-related clothing. In 1993 they opened their first shop, on London's Fulham Road; they named it "FatFace" after the Face de Bellevarde slope in Val-d'Isère. In 2000, they sold 40% of the company to Livingbridge for £5 million. In 2005 Advent International, a private equity company, bought Livingbridge's interest in FatFace.

In 2007 FatFace was acquired, for £360 million, by private equity group Bridgepoint Capital; the sale netted Slade and Leaver £90 million. The company's sales were badly hit by the Great Recession, forcing Bridgepoint to write off half the company's value, but improved in 2010 and again in 2011. Bridgepoint planned to float a quarter of the company on the London stock exchange in 2014, hoping to raise £110 million, but later cancelled the flotation due to lack of confidence by prospective stockholders.

In September 2020, FatFace announced the completion of a lender led debt and capital restructuring of Fat Face Group Borrowings Limited (the "Fat Face Group"). Following the restructuring there was a change of control of the parent company of the FatFace Group ("FatFace" or "Company"), to Fulham Parent Limited. As a result of the restructuring, FatFace's ownership has changed hands from its majority shareholder, Bridgepoint, to the group's lenders through its newly formed parent company. As part of the restructure the debt profile of the group significantly reduced, from loans and borrowings (excluding lease liabilities) with a face value of £172.4 million at the completion date to £25.6 million at the period end with expiry dates between September 2023 and May 2024.

In March 2021 FatFace revealed to customers and staff that they had been subject to a ransomware attack in January 2021 and paid $2 million ransom to Conti cyber criminals to unlock encrypted data.

In September 2021, Liz Evans stepped down as CEO and was replaced by Will Crumbie. At that point, Crumbie had been with the business for eight years as CFO. Before FatFace he held senior financial and executive positions within the Walgreen Boots Alliance Group and P&O. Colin Porter is the Chairman.

In October 2023, Next plc announced that it had acquired FatFace for a total value of £115.2 million. Next hold 97% of the equity and FatFace's management will hold 3% of the business. In September 2024, online operations migrated to a new website hosted via Next's Total Platform.
