= Loughlinstown =

Outer suburb of Dublin, Ireland

Loughlinstown Baile Uí Lachnáin (Irish)
- Suburb
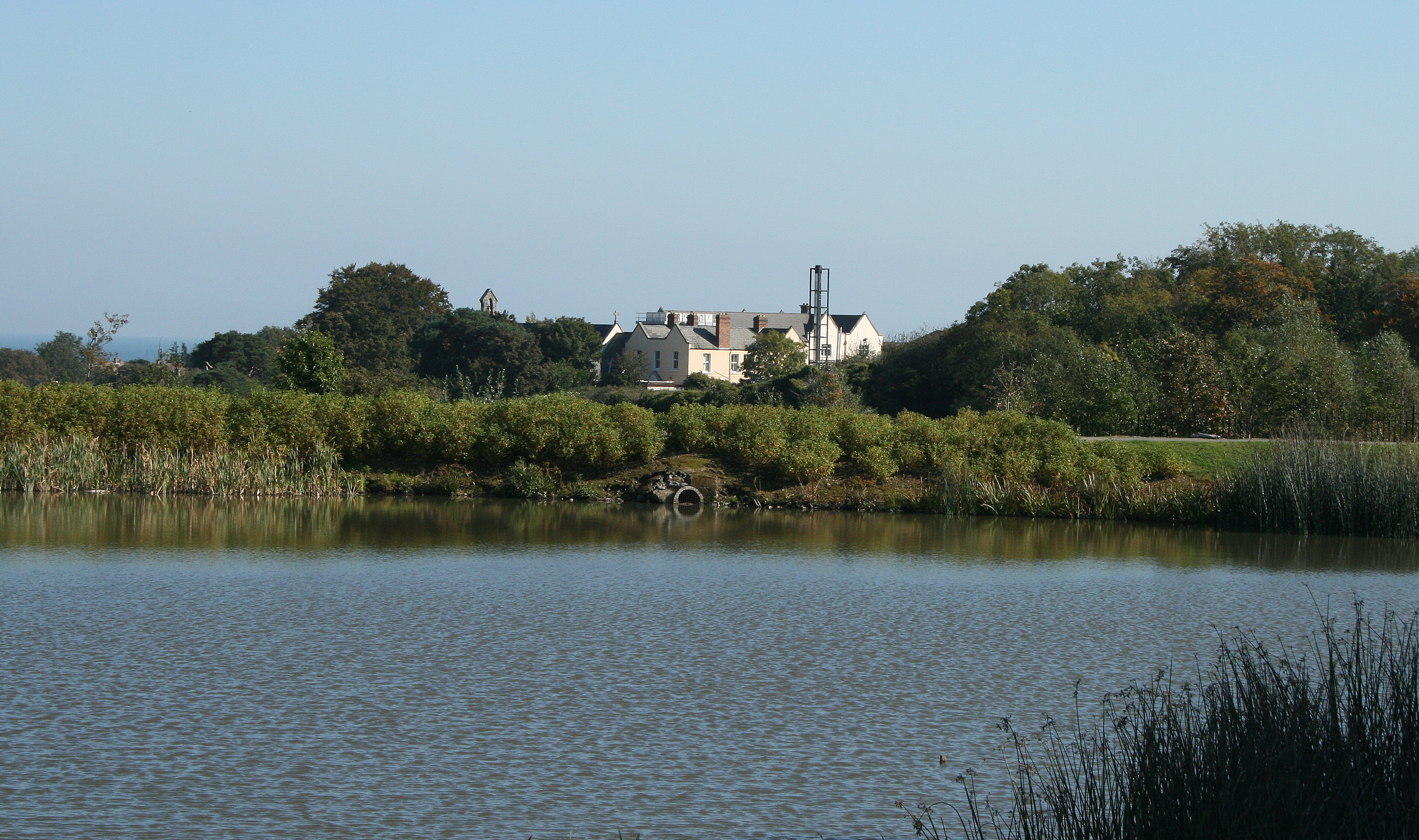
- Loughlinstown Hospital

- Location in Ireland
- Coordinates: 53°15′N 6°08′W
- Country: Ireland
- Province: Leinster
- County: Dún Laoghaire–Rathdown
- Time zone: UTC±0 (WET)
  - Summer (DST): UTC+1 (IST)
- Eircode routing key: D18
- Telephone area code: +353(0)1

Loughlinstown (Irish: Baile Uí Lachnáin, meaning 'O'Laughnan's town') is a suburb on the southern outskirts of Dublin, Ireland. It is in the Dún Laoghaire–Rathdown council area, 14 km south-east of the city centre, on the N11 road.

Loughlinstown is the location of St. Columcille's Hospital, which serves both south Dublin and Wicklow. The European Foundation for the Improvement of Living and Working Conditions, an EU body, is located in Loughlinstown House.

== Etymology ==
Loughlinstown is a corrupted English translation of the Irish name Baile Uí Lachnáin, meaning "O'Laughnan's town". This was historically anglicized 'Ballyloughnan' and 'Ballylaghnan'.

== Early history ==
Loughlinstown was inhabited from at least the Neolithic period when the megalithic portal tomb at Cromlech Fields was constructed circa 2,500 B.C. Following Henry II's conquest of Ireland, the lands around Loughlinstown were granted to the Anglo-Norman Talbot Family. By 1541 they had been granted to the Goodman Family, who held them as "warden of the marches" protecting the southern border of the Pale from raids and incursions of the Wicklow Septs.

A 1654 survey describes the area as containing 458 acres, of which 300 acres were the property of James Goodman, who acted as Provost Marshal of the Irish Confederate Army during the Irish Rebellion of 1641. The remaining 128 acres were the property of the Dean of Christchurch.

Loughlinstown was granted to Sir William Domville, Attorney General for Ireland, in the reign of Charles II and James II. The Domville family held the lands for three centuries until 1962 when they were sold to Sir John Galvin.

In 1975 Loughlinstown House and Commons were the subject to a Compulsory Purchase Order by the Dublin Corporation.

== Recent history ==
The village of Loughlinstown grew on commonage land on the Dublin to Bray high road. During the 1960s, one of the earliest stretches of dual carriageway in Ireland was built through the area, leaving the village scattered along the western side of the new road.

For years a large mature chestnut tree was located in the middle of the dual carriageway at its junction with the Wyatville Road. It was known as The Big Tree and was a landmark feature on the road from Dublin to Wicklow. In the 1970s the junction was upgraded and the tree removed. In 2004 the 1960s road was replaced with a new dual carriageway and the junction was replaced with an overbridge.

=== Loughlinstown Workhouse ===
The Rathdown Union, which was established in 1839, constructed a workhouse on 8 acres of land just south of Loughlinstown village. The institution provided 600 places for the destitute of Dundrum, Blackrock, Stillorgan, Kingstown (Dún Laoghaire), Killiney, Glencullen, Rathmichael, Powerscourt, Bray and Delgany. At the height of the Irish Famine the workhouse catered for almost 800 individuals. The institution now houses St. Columcille's Hospital.

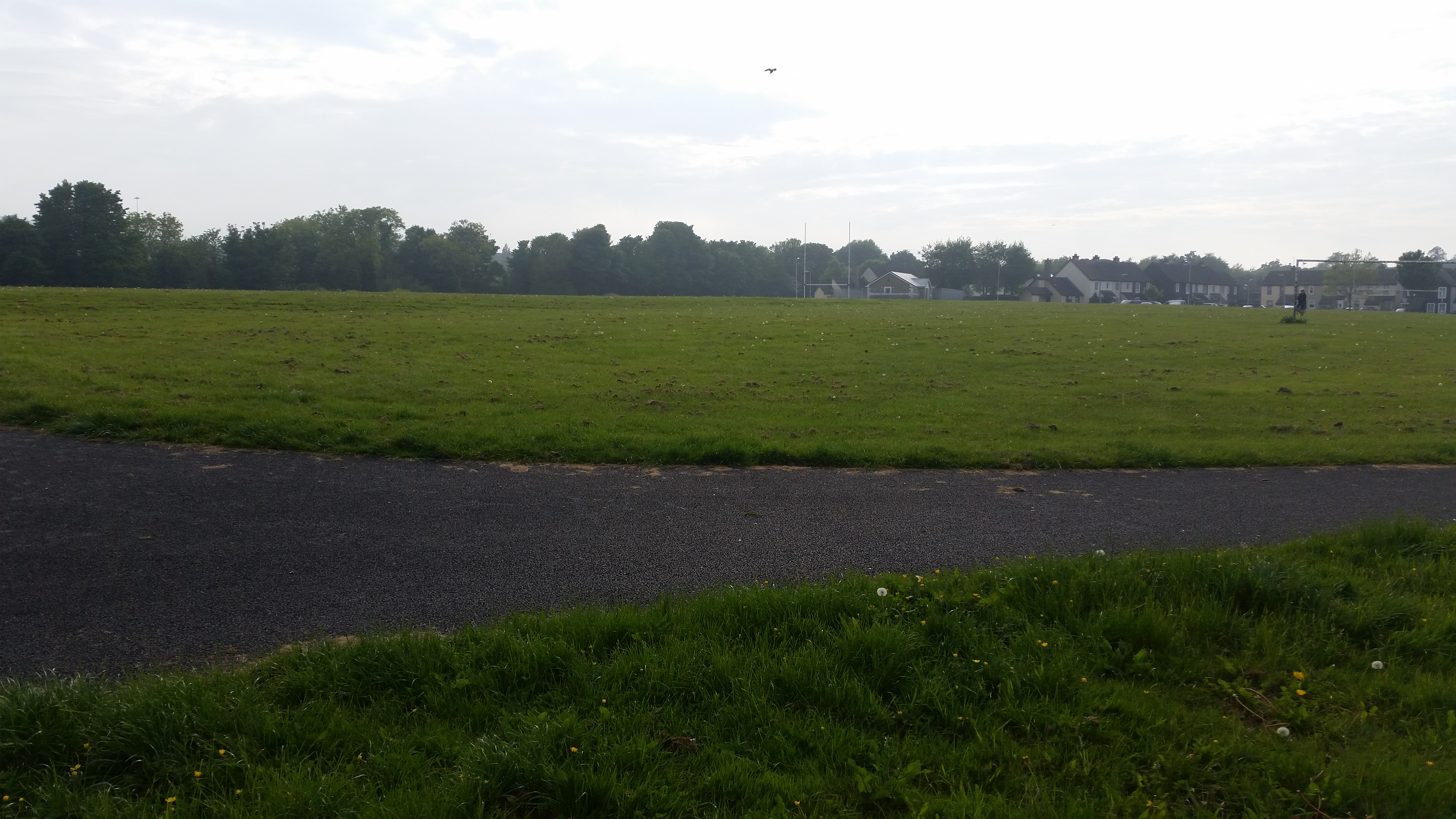
Loughlinstown Wood & Common

== Education ==
There are eight primary schools in the area. In Loughlinstown, St Columbanus (Catholic, mixed); in Ballybrack, St John's (Catholic, mixed), Gaelscoil Phadraig (Catholic, mixed) and Scoil Colmcille junior and senior schools (Catholic, mixed); in Shankill, Scoil Mhuire (Catholic, mixed), Rathmichael NS (Church of Ireland, mixed) and St Anne's (Catholic, mixed).

There are three secondary schools: St Laurence College (Catholic, mixed); Holy Child Killiney (Catholic, girls) and John Scottus (interdenominational, mixed).

== Transport ==
=== Bus ===
The 7 and 7a (to Mountjoy Square), 84a (Blackrock to Newcastle), 145 (Heuston station to Ballywaltrim) and 155 (Ikea, Ballymun to Bray station) routes from Dublin Bus serve Loughlinstown. The 111 Go-Ahead Ireland route from Brides Glen to Dalkey also serves Loughlinstown.

=== Rail ===
The Luas Green Line isn’t far from Loughlinstown, the nearest stops are Cherrywood and Brides Glen, which provide a 40-minute journey to Dublin city centre. There have been plans to extend the Green Line to the station in Bray, which if they went ahead as planned, would mean the line would pass through Loughlinstown. However these plans are dormant for now.

The DART is also close by, with the nearest station being Shankill.

=== Road ===
The N11 national route and the M11 bypass meet at Loughlinstown. The M50 orbital motorway also has an exit close to Loughlinstown.

== See also ==
- List of towns and villages in Ireland
