= Merlin Park University Hospital =

- Health Service Executive
- Shown in Ireland

Geography
- Location: Old Dublin Road, Galway, Ireland
- Coordinates: 53.2775°N 8.9927°W

Organisation
- Care system: HSE
- Type: Teaching
- Affiliated university: University of Galway

History
- Opened: 1953

Links
- Website: Official Website

Merlin Park University Hospital (MPUH) (Irish: Ospidéal Ollscoile Pháirc Mherlin) is a public hospital in Galway, Ireland. It is managed by Saolta University Health Care Group. MPUH and University Hospital Galway comprise Galway University Hospitals.

== History ==
The hospital, which was commissioned as a tuberculosis sanitarium, was designed by Norman White. It was built on the site of Merlin Park House, a late Georgian property, and opened in 1953. In October 2018, it was reported that a 200-bed elective-only facility would be built at the hospital.
