= Our Lady's Hospital, Navan =

Our Lady's Hospital
- Health Service Executive
- Shown in Ireland

Geography
- Location: Navan, County Meath, Ireland
- Coordinates: 53.6505°N 6.6992°W

Organisation
- Care system: HSE
- Type: General

History
- Founded: 1842

Links
- Website: www.hse.ie/eng/services/list/3/acutehospitals/hospitals/navan/

Our Lady's Hospital (Irish: Ospidéal Mhuire) is a general hospital in Navan, County Meath, Ireland. It is managed by Ireland East Hospital Group.

== History ==
The hospital has its origins in the Navan Union Workhouse and Infirmary which was designed by George Wilkinson and opened in March 1842. The facility was reconstructed as Our Lady's Hospital in the 1920s. Following a march and protests in May 2014, the hospital still has a 24-hour accident & emergency service.

In June 2022, the Health Service Executive announced that it planned to close the accident and emergency department and to replace it with an urgent care clinic.
