= Mayo University Hospital =

Hospital in County Mayo, Ireland

- Health Service Executive
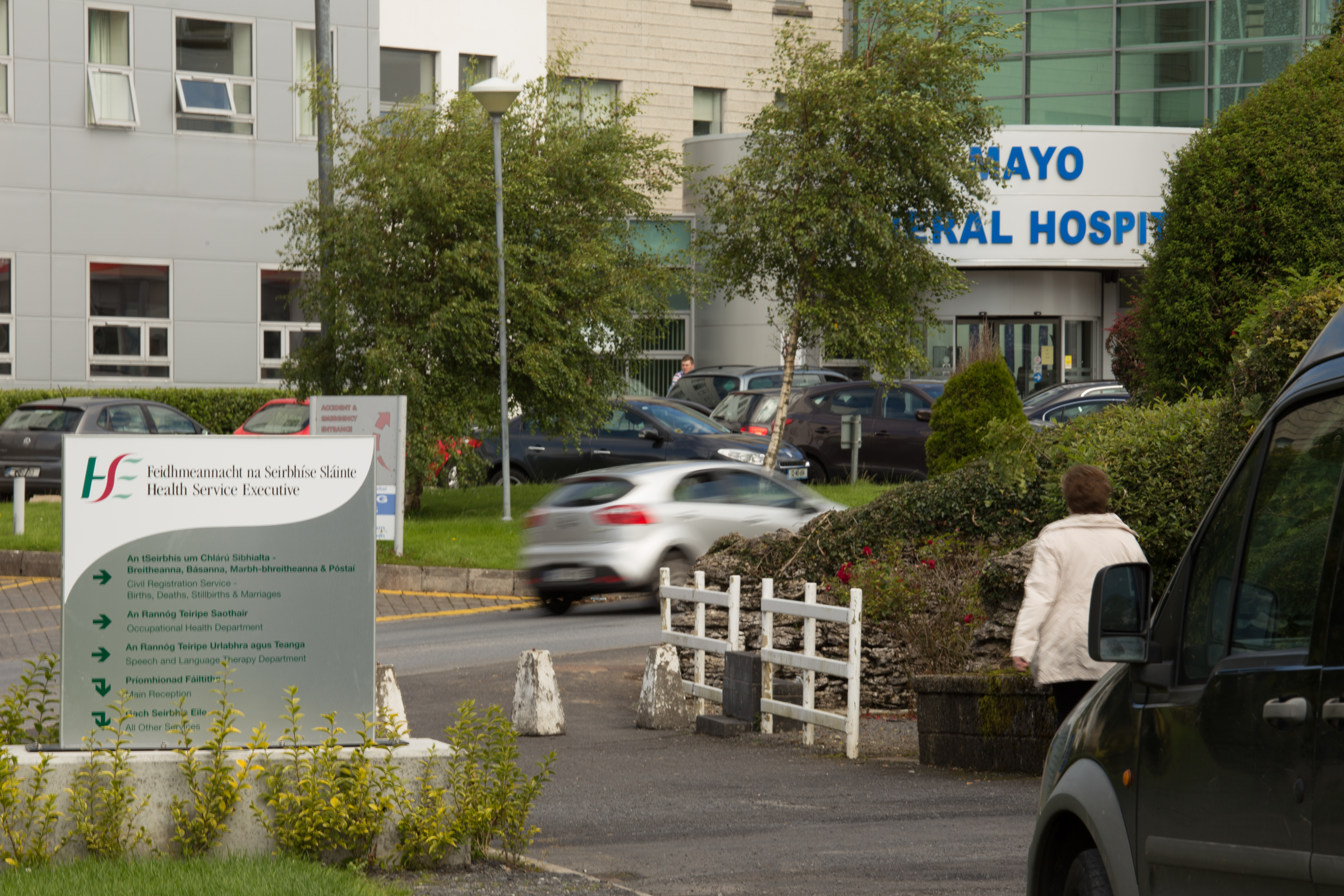
- Mayo University Hospital

- Hospital location in County Mayo

Geography
- Location: Castlebar, County Mayo, Ireland
- Coordinates: 53.8519°N 9.3033°W

Organisation
- Care system: Health Service Executive
- Type: General

Services
- Emergency department: Accident and Emergency
- Beds: 332

History
- Founded: 1938

Links
- Website: www.saolta.ie/hospital/muh
- Lists: Hospitals in the Republic of Ireland

Mayo University Hospital (Irish: Ospidéal Ollscoile Mhaigh Eo) is a general hospital in Castlebar, County Mayo, Ireland. It is managed by Saolta University Health Care Group.

== History ==
The hospital originated in the Mayo County Hospital, built on Westport Road in Castlebar on the site of the old county jail. Construction began in 1933, and initial cost estimates of £90,000 were exceeded due to contractual issues. After legal delays, the original contractor was replaced by Hull and Co. of Ringsend, Dublin. Further delays occurred in acquiring sterilisation and radiological equipment. Despite these issues, the hospital was completed and equipped by late 1938, with an anticipated total cost of £150,000 once all auxiliary buildings were finished. The facility was officially opened in October 1938, with an opening ceremony conducted by the Minister for Justice, P. J. Ruttledge, and the building was blessed by Bishop Joseph Walsh. In addition to the main facility, a separate nurses' home costing £8,000 was built nearby to house 30 nurses, including 18 trainees.

The 1938 facility was a two-storey building designed to capture natural light, with 20 wards accommodating up to 124 patients, including a six-bed maternity unit. Ward sizes varied from single-bed rooms to 12-bed units. The ground floor housed the Matron's and House Surgeon's offices, reception, and medical departments, while the second floor contained surgical rooms and the operating theatre. The facility featured a modern kitchen with a food-lift, along with an X-ray room, violet-ray department, pathology lab, and accident ward. Heating was installed using integrated panel systems, and floors were laid with rubidium for quietness and longevity. An internal telephone system connected all departments. The hospital also featured aluminium adjustable beds, sun balconies, and landscaped grounds.

The facility was later renamed Mayo General Hospital.

Barry Desmond was Minister for Health between December 1982 and January 1987. During his tenure, he publicly sanctioned the redevelopment of the hospital while appearing on a television programme, citing Mayo's urgent need for improved medical facilities. However, when the new hospital was eventually opened, Desmond was not invited to the official ceremony, a decision that led to considerable controversy given his role in approving the project.

Taoiseach Enda Kenny opened a new Renal Dialysis Unit in December 2013. The hospital changed its name from Mayo General Hospital to Mayo University Hospital in November 2015.

== Notable patients ==
Notable patients have included:

- Sir Ernst Boris Chain, died in the hospital on 12 August 1979. He was a German-born British biochemist, and a 1945 co-recipient of the Nobel Prize for Physiology or Medicine for his work on penicillin.
- Actor Robert Shaw, died there on 28 August 1978 after suffering a heart attack at the side of the road in Tourmakeady, near the hospital.
