= Roscommon University Hospital =

- Health Service Executive
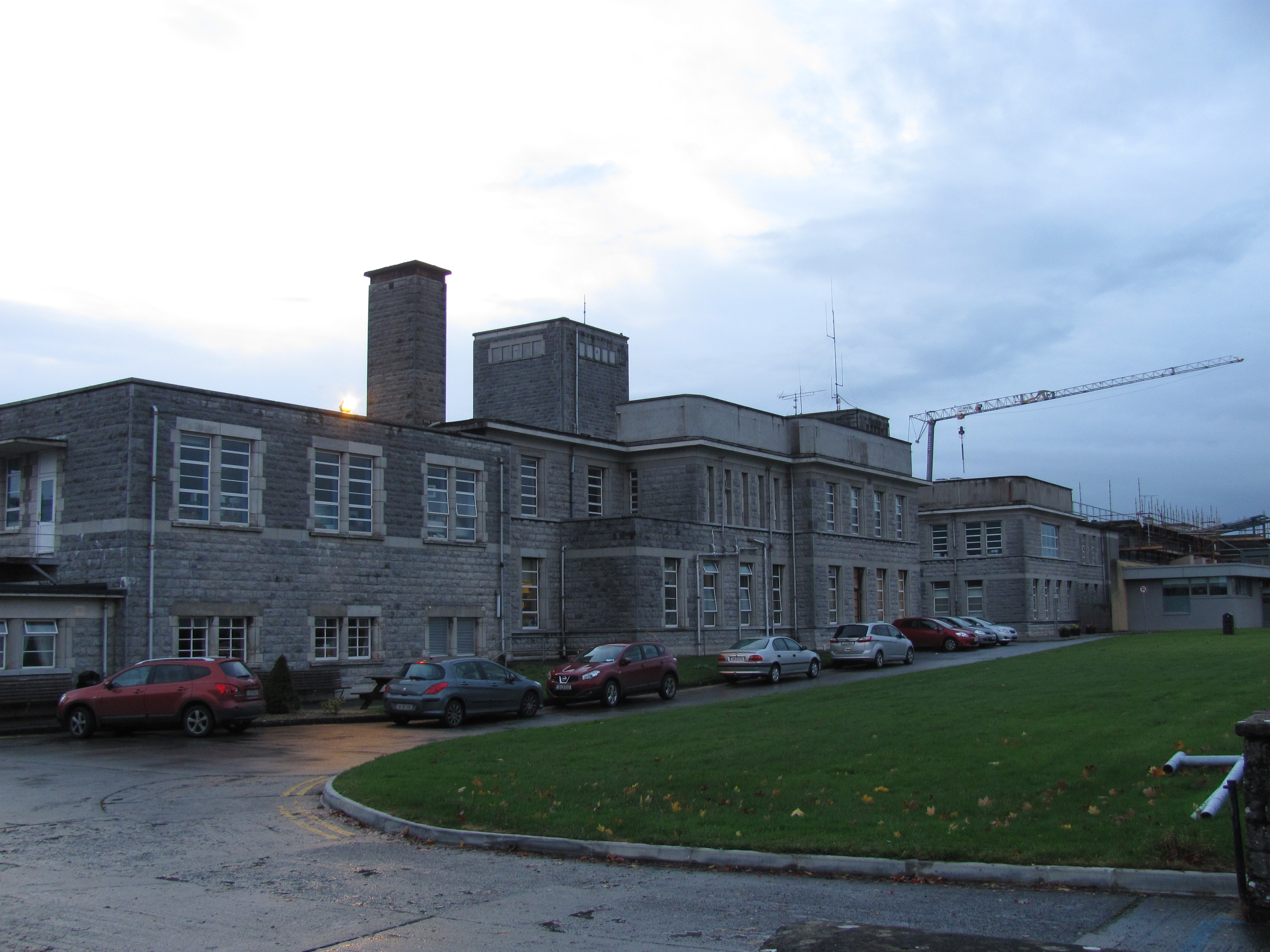
- Roscommon University Hospital

- Shown in Ireland

Geography
- Location: Roscommon, Ireland
- Coordinates: 53.6250°N 8.1773°W

Organisation
- Care system: HSE
- Type: General

Services
- Beds: 115

History
- Founded: 1941

Links
- Website: www.saolta.ie/hospital/ruh

Roscommon University Hospital (Irish: Ospidéal Ollscoile Ros Comáin) is a general hospital based in County Roscommon, Ireland. It is situated on the N61 just outside Roscommon town. It is managed by Saolta University Health Care Group.

== History ==
=== Early history ===
The hospital was built at a cost of £120,000 and at the time it was built it had "98 beds for surgical and medical cases, in addition to special children's and maternity wards". It was commissioned to replace the infirmary at Abbeytown (now the County Library) and opened as Roscommon County Hospital in November 1941.

=== Closure of maternity services ===
St Anne's maternity ward closed in 1978 when the Health Board refused to appoint an obstetrician-gynaecologist to the hospital. Since that date, there has been no maternity department in County Roscommon.

=== Closure of accident & emergency services ===
The Roscommon Hospital Action Committee (HAC) was a campaign group established to protest against the downgrading of Accident and Emergency services at the hospital. In December 2006, the Roscommon Hospital Action Committee criticised what it called the "fudged language" of the Health Service Executive (HSE) on emergency care at the hospital. Later, in August 2010, thousands of people marched through Roscommon to the hospital where they made a human chain.

Taoiseach Enda Kenny confirmed the downgrading of emergency services at the hospital while visiting Roscommon to open a constituency office for Denis Naughten on 27 June 2011. He was met by protesters. While campaigning ahead of the general election earlier that year, Kenny had been recorded by a journalist promising emergency care would be kept at the hospital if people voted for Naughten and Frank Feighan. In July 2011, when the downgrading of services had been confirmed and the recording made public, Kenny spoke of his regret for the confusion his words may have caused voters.

During July and August 2011, members of the Roscommon Hospital Action Committee protested at Leinster House, at several bridges over the River Shannon, and at a sit-in at the hospital's 24-hour emergency unit.

After a woman discovered files containing the personal details of hundreds of patients from the Midland Regional Hospital, Mullingar, in a bin outside Roscommon Hospital, she gave them to the Roscommon Hospital Action Committee which passed them on to the Data Protection Commissioner. Three investigations were established.

In late 2011, despite protests by the Roscommon Hospital Action Committee, the hospital's Accident and Emergency unit closed and was replaced with an "Urgent Care Unit". Since that date, there have been no emergency services in County Roscommon.

=== Recent history ===
The hospital became Roscommon University Hospital in November 2015.
