= 2026 Belgian hospital cyberattack =

2026 cyberattack

The 2026 Belgian hospital cyberattack started on Tuesday January 13, 2026 when the AZ Monica hospital in Antwerp detected a serious disruption in the computer systems. The hospital shut down servers in the Antwerp and Deurne campuses. The reason for the attack is unknown.

== Impact ==
All surgeries on Tuesday were cancelled, affecting at least 70 surgeries across both campuses. Seven patients were transferred to another hospital, some of them critical. Patients were urged to attend their family doctors, out-of-hours clinic or other emergency service, as the emergency department at AZ Monica was operating at low capacity.

Patient registration times at the hospital were affected. Three weeks after the attack, AZ Monica restarted its electronic patient record system, allowing patients to register at the kiosks again. The hospital had mostly worked on paper in the meantime. Its chief executive, Geert Smits, said it expected to return to normal operations during the following week once its remaining IT systems had been restarted.

The Mobile Urgency Groups, who provide clinicians and nurses at the scene of an incident, and Paraprofessional Intervention Teams, who provide emergency care en route to a hospital, were unavailable due to the cyberattack.
