= St. Columcille's Hospital =

- Health Service Executive
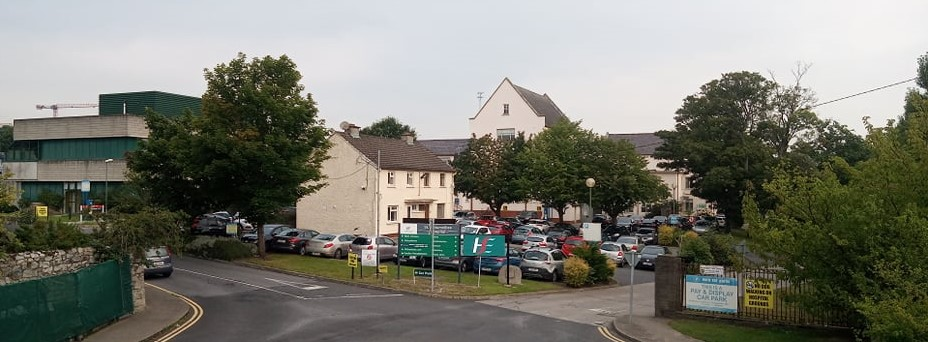
- St. Columcille's Hospital

- Shown in Dublin

Geography
- Location: Loughlinstown, Dún Laoghaire–Rathdown, Ireland
- Coordinates: 53.2429°N 6.1347°W

Organisation
- Care system: HSE
- Type: General

Services
- Beds: 118

History
- Founded: 1841

Links
- Website: www.hse.ie/eng/services/list/3/acutehospitals/hospitals/loughlinstown/

St. Columcille's Hospital (Irish: Ospidéal Naomh Colm Cille) is a public hospital providing acute-care hospital services and located in Loughlinstown, County Dublin, Ireland. It is managed by Ireland East Hospital Group.

The hospital has its origins in the Rathdown Union Workhouse and Infirmary which was designed by George Wilkinson and opened in February 1841. Additional accommodation was opened by converting stables during the famine in the 1840s. The workhouse infirmary was re-designated a district hospital in 1920.

The hospital provides 118 beds, of which 110 are in-patient acute beds, while 8 are reserved for acute day cases. It is home to the National Gender Service (NGS).
