= University Hospital Galway =

- Health Service Executive
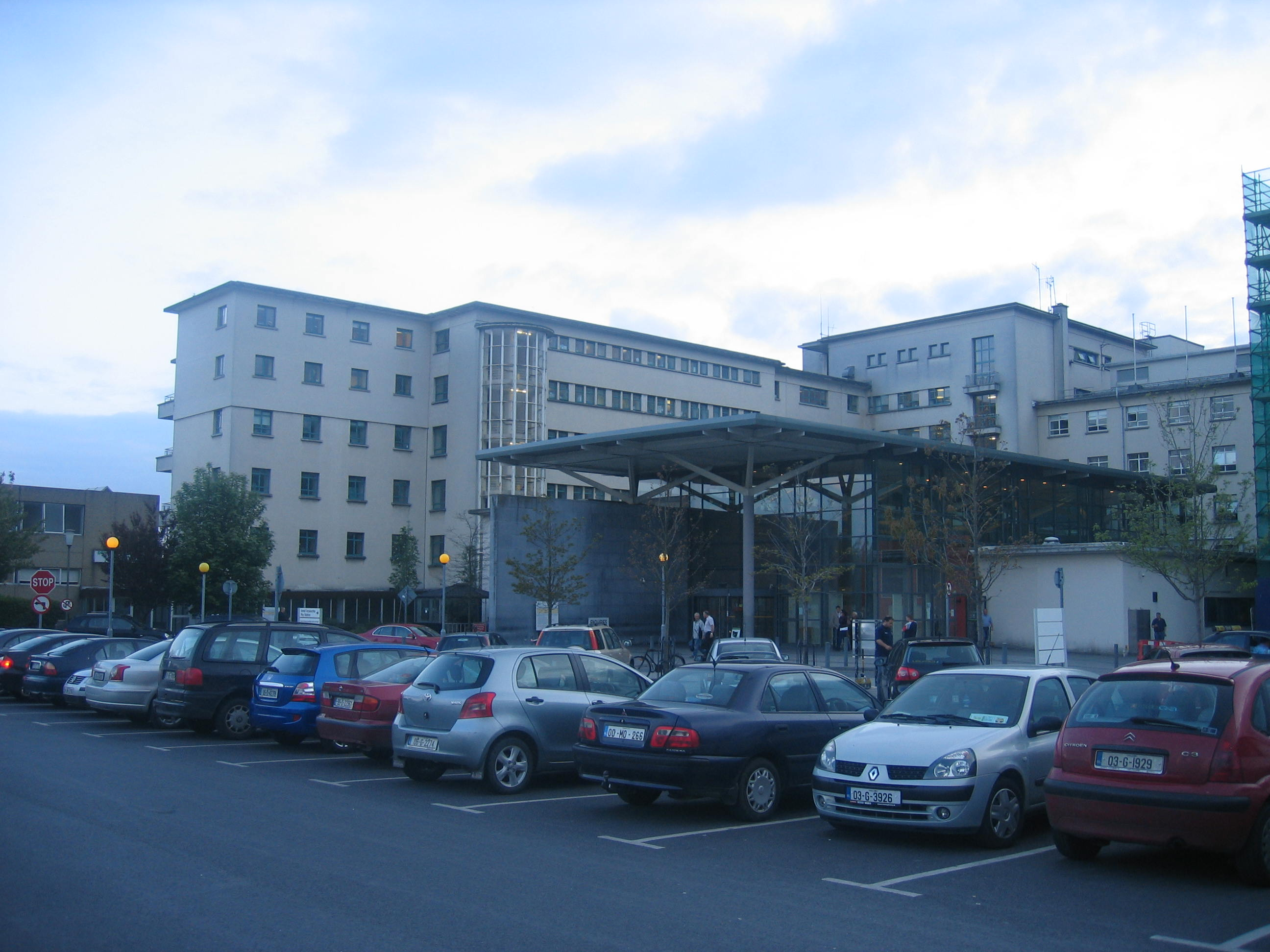
- University Hospital Galway

- Shown in Ireland

Geography
- Location: Newcastle Road, Galway, Ireland
- Coordinates: 53.2766°N 9.0672°W

Organisation
- Care system: HSE
- Type: Teaching
- Affiliated university: University of Galway

Services
- Emergency department: Yes
- Beds: 521

Helipads
- Helipad: Yes

History
- Opened: 1924

Links
- Website: saolta.ie/hospital/university-hospital-galway

University Hospital Galway (Irish: Ospidéal na hOllscoile, Gaillimh) is a major acute hospital in Galway, Ireland. It is managed by Saolta University Health Care Group. UHG and Merlin Park University Hospital (in the east of Galway city) comprise Galway University Hospitals.

== History ==
The hospital has its origins in the Galway Central Hospital which was completed in 1924. A new facility, which was designed by Thomas Joseph Cullen and built on the same site as the old hospital, opened as Galway Regional Hospital in 1956. It became University College Hospital Galway in 1993 and went on to become University Hospital Galway in 2006.

== Services ==
University Hospital Galway is the Saolta Model 4 Hospital delivering 24/7 emergency medicine, acute medicine, acute surgery, critical care, maternity, neonatal, paediatric, cancer, laboratory and radiology alongside a wide range of tertiary referral services for the Saolta Group. It is a designated supraregional centre for cancer and cardiac services, and is one of the major academic teaching hospitals in Ireland, partnered with University of Galway.

== Performance ==
In 2023 University Hospital Galway opened a new radiation oncology unit marking the largest infrastructure development in the history of the hospital. The 8,000sqm radiotherapy centre cost €70.7 million to build and commission and contains new technology which increases significantly the ability to accurately target and treat tumours.

Pádraig Conneely, then mayor of Galway and chair of HSE West, accused the management at the hospital of not improving work practices quickly enough, after reports that 1,348 patients were "left on trolleys" in the first four months of 2014, while noting that this was a decrease since a peak figure of 2,088 in 2011. The mayor remarked on a number of inefficiencies in the hospital and spoke of "horror cases" were patients waited for two days without being admitted.

In the April 2011 Healthstat survey of the 29 Acute Hospitals of Ireland. UHG was ranked "worst-performing in the country". This resulted in political calls for the Minister for Health to intervene, as it was the only hospital in the "red zone" in the ranking system, a classification denoting that management and the services provided, require attention.

== Incidents ==
=== Death of Savita Halappanavar ===
In October 2012, a pregnant Indian woman by the name of Savita Halappanavar suffered a miscarriage and died after seeking treatment at the hospital. The death led to protests over Ireland's anti-abortion laws and investigations into the actions of the hospital during her treatment. The inquest returned a verdict of "medical misadventure" on 19 April 2013.

In 2014 an independent review of services at the hospital by consultants Ernst & Young, to assess the implementation of the 15 local recommendations made by HIQA for the hospital, determined that "significant progress" had been made, specifically with the implementation of the required culture of "continuous learning". The independent report however noted that four of the recommendations had not yet been met at the specified time for the review, one of which being an "action plan" for "compliance with national standards within the hospital".

=== Overdose to gain admission ===
In 2015, the Connacht Tribune reported that a 47-year-old suicidal woman with special needs was told that, after previously attempting suicide, when presenting to the hospital upon having been taken out of the Atlantic Ocean by Gardaí in distress, she would need to take an overdose in order to be admitted to the psychiatric ward of the hospital. The woman later took an overdose.
