= Wexford General Hospital =

Coordinates: 52.3428°N 6.4824°W

- Health Service Executive
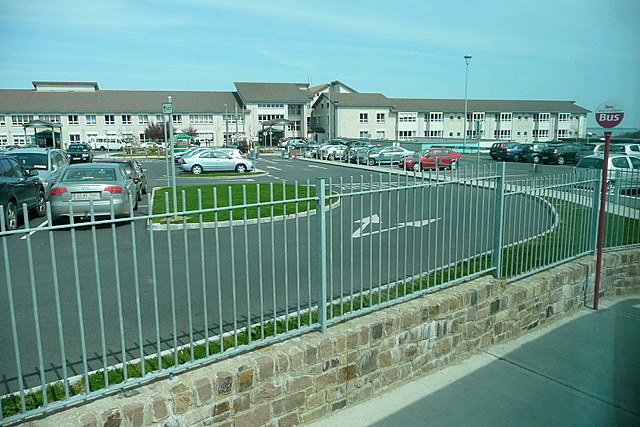
- Wexford General Hospital

- Shown in Ireland

Geography
- Location: Newtown Road, Carricklawn, Wexford, Ireland

Organisation
- Care system: HSE
- Type: General
- Affiliated university: University College Dublin

Services
- Emergency department: Yes Accident & Emergency
- Beds: 280

History
- Founded: 1928

Links
- Lists: Hospitals in the Republic of Ireland

Wexford General Hospital (Irish: Ospidéal Ginearálta Loch Garman) is an acute general hospital in Wexford, the county town of County Wexford in the Republic of Ireland. It is managed by Ireland East Hospital Group.

== History ==
The hospital originally opened as Wexford County Hospital in December 1928, in the premises of the old Wexford Union Workhouse on Old Hospital Road, which had been established on 25 July 1842.

From March 1965 to 1978, the County Hospital medical department was moved to Brownswood Hospital in Enniscorthy.

Improvements to the existing facilities were completed under the auspices of the South Eastern Health Board during the 1970s. In 1978, the Minister for Health established a group to plan for the hospital's future. Land beside the Newtown Road in Carricklawn close to the County Hospital was made available. The decision to build a new hospital was finalized by the SEHB in November 1982, but it was not until February 1988 that construction of the new building began, and it was completed in 1992. The hospital was renamed Wexford General Hospital at that time.

It had been originally intended to demolish the old hospital building, but it was designated as a protected structure, preventing its demolition.

In 2010, thousands of people protested about proposed changes to the status of the hospital.

In 2013 it was listed in the Protection of Life During Pregnancy Bill 2013, subsequently enacted as the Protection of Life During Pregnancy Act 2013, as one of the institutions where abortions are authorized to be carried out under the Act.

In 2014 two new extensions with a combined floor area of 4,600 square metres were completed.

In 2017 the Herbert Amon Unit, an early maternity unit, was opened.

On 1 March 2023, a large fire broke out in the hospital, resulting in a major emergency being declared and four wards, including the ICU, and over 200 patients being evacuated.
