= St. Luke's General Hospital =

Public hospital in Kilkenny city, Ireland

- Health Service Executive
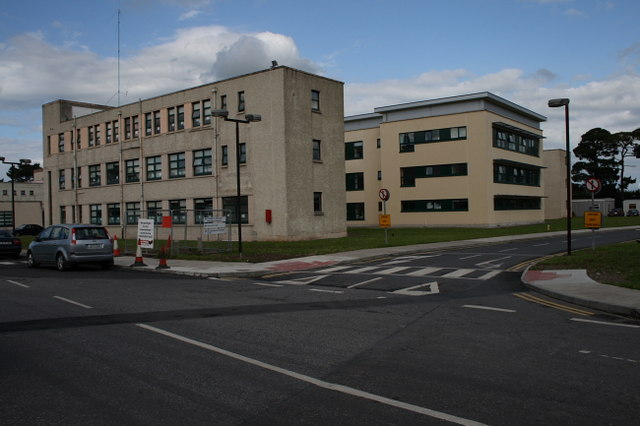
- St. Luke's General Hospital

- Shown in Ireland

Geography
- Location: Kilkenny, County Kilkenny, Ireland
- Coordinates: 52.6665°N 7.2644°W

Organisation
- Care system: HSE
- Type: General

Services
- Emergency department: Yes Accident & Emergency
- Beds: 285

History
- Founded: 1941

Links
- Website: www.hse.ie/eng/services/list/3/acutehospitals/hospitals/lukeskilkenny/
- Lists: Hospitals in the Republic of Ireland

St. Luke's General Hospital (Irish: Ospidéal Ginearálta Naomh Lúcás) is a public hospital located in Kilkenny, County Kilkenny, Ireland. It is 2 km north of the city centre, on the R693 road. The hospital is managed by Ireland East Hospital Group.

== History ==
The hospital was opened as Kilkenny County Hospital on 18 December 1941. New facilities, including a new accident & emergency department, acute medical assessment unit, day services unit and education centre were completed in 2016.

== Services ==
The hospital provides 285 beds, of which 228 are in-patient acute beds, while 12 are reserved for day cases. A further 45 beds are designated for in-patient psychiatric care.
