= Sligo University Hospital =

- Health Service Executive
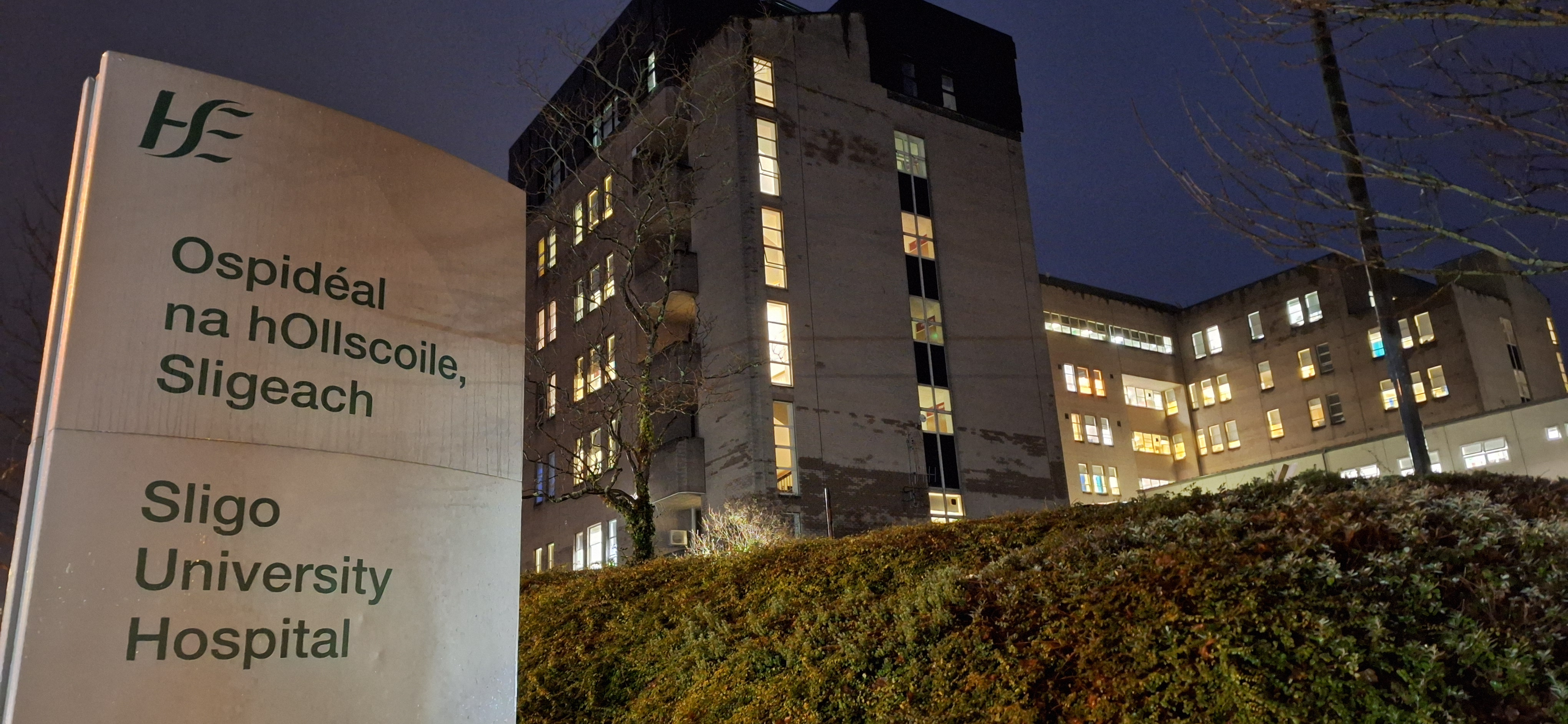
- Part of Sligo University Hospital in 2024

- Shown in Ireland

Geography
- Location: Sligo, County Sligo, Ireland
- Coordinates: 54.274216°N 8.462601°W

Organisation
- Care system: HSE
- Type: Acute Regional Hospital

Services
- Beds: 359

History
- Founded: 1940; 86 years ago

Links
- Website: www.saolta.ie/hospital/suh

Sligo University Hospital (Irish: Ospidéal Ollscoile Shligigh) is an acute general hospital in Sligo, Ireland. It is managed by Saolta University Health Care Group.

== History ==
The hospital has its origins in the Sligo County Hospital which was built in the Mall in Sligo and opened in 1940. A major extension to the hospital was officially opened by Erskine Childers, Tánaiste in March 1971. The hospital changed its name from Sligo General Hospital to Sligo University Hospital in November 2015.
