= Social impact of the COVID-19 pandemic in the Republic of Ireland =

Indirect effects of the COVID-19 pandemic in the Republic of Ireland

The COVID-19 pandemic in the Republic of Ireland has had far-reaching consequences in the country that go beyond the spread of the disease itself and efforts to quarantine it, including political, educational and sporting implications.

== Arts ==
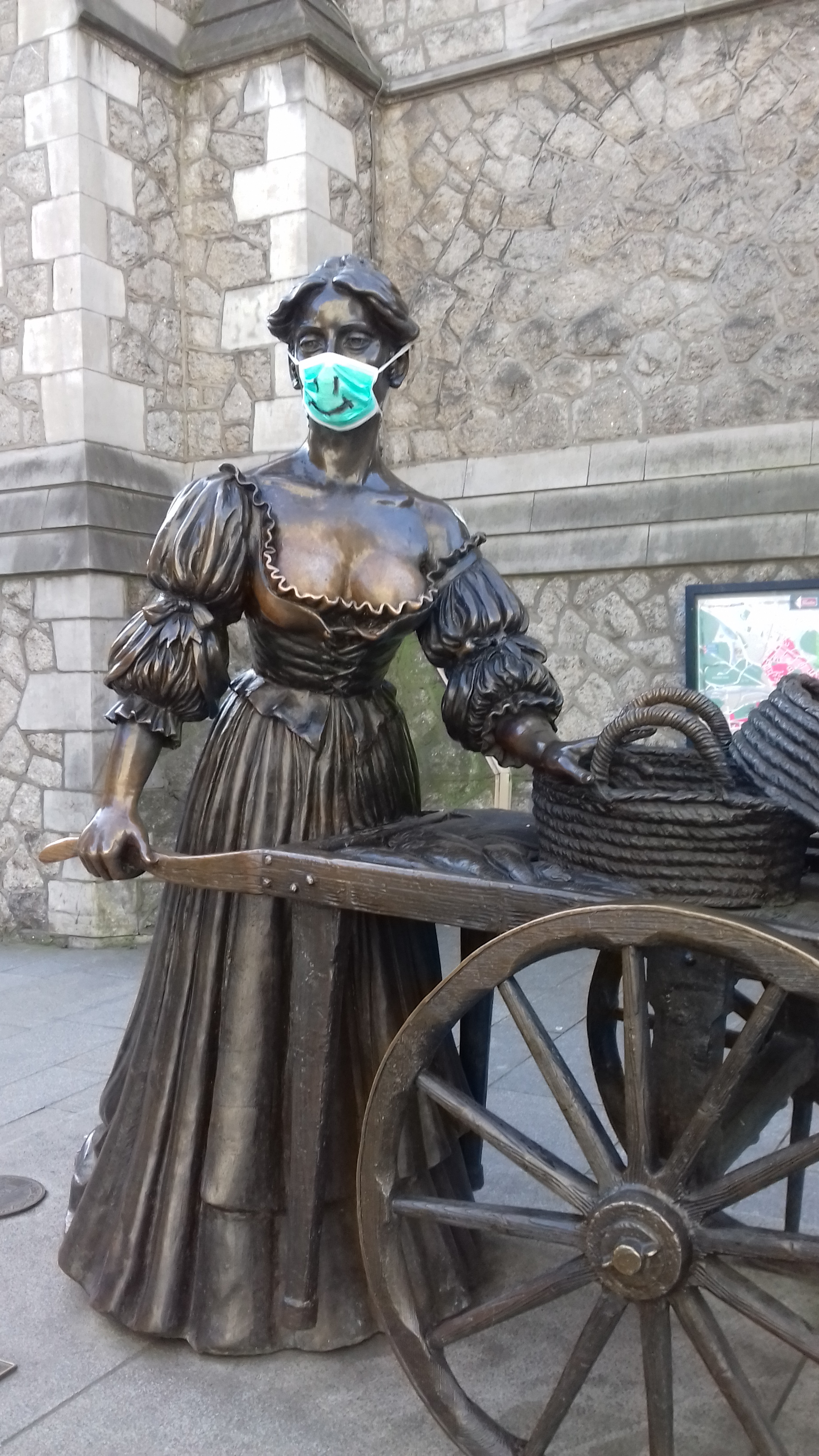
Molly Malone wearing a smiley mask during the COVID-19 pandemic

=== Parades and general festivals ===
St Patrick's Day parades were called off due to concerns that they would be a threat to public health. Galway was the last Irish city to do so, as its local politicians simply deferred making the decision until the government forced it upon them by cancelling all parades. The Orange Order cancelled its annual 12 July parades due to the virus, with one of those taking place in Rossnowlagh. On 11 March, the organisers for Dublin Comic Con announced the cancellation of their 2020 Spring convention, due to have taken place in the Convention Centre from 15 to 17 March and which would have hosted celebrity guests such as Jason Isaacs and Peter Weller. On 29 April, it was announced that the 2020 Dublin Pride Festival would be cancelled, with an alternative "interactive digital festival" taking place instead. 26 June brought the cancellation of the 2020 Ballinasloe Horse Fair festival, due to have taken place in Ballinasloe at the beginning of October. 20 July brought the cancellation of the 2020 Lisdoonvarna Matchmaking Festival, due to have taken place in Lisdoonvarna from 4 September. The cancellation of the festival was said to be a €2.5 million loss to the economy of the town.

On 20 January 2021, the St Patrick's Day parade in Dublin was cancelled for a second year.

On 14 July 2021, the Ballinasloe Horse Fair festival was cancelled for a second year in a row.

On 17 March 2022, celebrations took place across the country to mark St Patrick's Day, following a two-year absence due to COVID-19, with around 400,000 people attending festivities in Dublin.

=== Galway 2020 ===
The European Commission had designated Galway as European Capital of Culture for 2020, a process begun—and planned for—years in advance. Following the Taoiseach's Washington announcement, which closed all cultural institutions until 29 March, the organisers of Galway 2020 announced that some of its upcoming events were cancelled, though most would be postponed. By 24 March, RTÉ reported that the entire year's itinerary was "in serious jeopardy". On 7 April, RTÉ reported that a teleconference that morning had revealed that most staff had been temporarily laid off and that the Creative Director for Galway 2020's contract had been brought to an end. By 10 April, The Art Newspaper reported that the year's entire programme had "essentially been abandoned".

=== Literature ===
Cork International Poetry Festival—scheduled for between 24 and 28 March—was cancelled. On 11 March, Dún Laoghaire's Mountains to Sea literary festival—scheduled for between 26 and 29 March—announced its 2020 event had been cancelled due to the virus. On 23 March, International Literature Festival Dublin—an annual literary festival scheduled for between 15 and 24 May—announced its postponement until later in the year and promised refunds to anyone who had purchased tickets for two events it had already announced involving Hilary Mantel and Bob Geldof, if these events did not go ahead at a later time. Listowel Writers' Week, in what would have been its fiftieth annual event and scheduled for between 27 and 31 May, was also cancelled due to the virus. On 30 March, the organisers of Galway city's main literary festival, the annual Cúirt International Festival of Literature—scheduled for between 20 and 25 April—announced it would not proceed "in its physical form" in 2020 due to problems created by the pandemic shutdown and the grounding of invited foreign writers abroad; however, only a small selection of the advertised events (including the Eilís Dillon centenary commemoration) were officially "postponed" and full ticket refunds were offered. On 6 April, Cúirt announced it would be holding the world's first completely digital literary festival between 23 and 25 April, with events to be held at traditional venues such as the Town Hall Theatre, Nun's Island and Charlie Byrne's Bookshop, and broadcast for free through YouTube (though it requested donations to support the writers involved). The annual Dalkey Book Festival—scheduled for between 18 and 21 June—announced its 2020 event had been postponed due to the virus.

=== Music ===
All events at the National Concert Hall were cancelled. The annual Feis Ceoil was cancelled. Music for Galway cancelled its annual Good Friday concert in the St Nicholas Collegiate Church, scheduled for 3 April, and its new nine-day Cellissimo festival dedicated to the cello was postponed until 2021. On 20 March, it was announced that the 2020 Fleadh Cheoil, due to have taken place in Mullingar in August, would be cancelled. The Irish Music Rights Organisation (IMRO), the Irish Recorded Music Association (IRMA), and First Music Contact (FMC) launched a joint emergency relief fund, with the support of Spotify's global relief fund, for Irish musicians (i.e. songwriters, composers, performers, session musicians and arrangers) whose livelihoods were affected. 22 April brought the cancellation of the 2020 Longitude Festival, due to have taken place at Marlay Park, Dún Laoghaire–Rathdown at the beginning of July. 11 May brought the cancellation of the 2020 Electric Picnic festival, due to have taken place in County Laois at the beginning of September.

On 10 May 2021, the 2021 Longitude Festival was cancelled for the second year in a row due to COVID-19 concerns.

On 28 May, following the government's announcement of a reopening plan for the country throughout June, July and August 2021, Minister for Tourism, Culture, Arts, Gaeltacht, Sport and Media Catherine Martin announced a series of pilot events to bring live music and culture back to Irish audiences. On 10 June, the first in a series of live pilot concerts took place at the Iveagh Gardens, Dublin, with James Vincent McMorrow and special guest Sorcha Richardson playing to 500 people at the show. A number of measures were implemented to ensure the safety of those attending the show, including staggered access times, socially distanced queuing systems, hygiene stations, socially distanced pods for attendees and the wearing of masks when outside the pod.

On 3 July, over 3,500 people attended a pilot music festival featuring Gavin James, Denise Chaila and Sharon Shannon in Dublin, with antigen testing used for entry.

On 2 August, Festival Republic, which runs the Electric Picnic festival, said that the 2021 festival in Stradbally, County Laois would go ahead for fully vaccinated or COVID-19 recovered people. On 4 August, Laois County Council refused to grant a licence to hold the 2021 Electric Picnic music festival following the most up-to-date public health advice made available to the council from the Health Service Executive. After the organisers requested Laois County Council to reverse the decision on the festival being cancelled, Electric Picnic 2021 was officially cancelled by the organisers after "running out of time".

On 23 August, music industry representatives criticised the Government after 40,000 people were allowed to attend the 2021 All-Ireland Senior Hurling Championship Final at Croke Park on 22 August, while the live entertainment industry remained closed, with representatives from a number of live event and music industry groups stating that the Taoiseach and Foreign Affairs Minister's attendance at the final was a "blatant disregard" for the live events industry.

On 30 September, a pilot nightclub event took place at the Button Factory in Dublin, which included a 60% capacity crowd of 450 people, vaccination certificates and antigen testing. The next day, it was revealed that no positive COVID-19 tests were reported at the pilot nightclub event, with the promotors stating they felt it was very successful.

On 19 October, the Government published a revised plan for the easing of restrictions on 22 October, with nightclubs allowed to reopen with a Digital COVID Certificate to be required for entry, along with social distancing and mask-wearing measures, until at least February 2022. On 22 October, nightclubs and late venues reopened after almost 600 days of closure, as new guidelines were published. On 26 October, following a series of meetings between Government officials and industry representatives, new rules for nightclubs were confirmed that would require people to buy electronic tickets at least one hour before arriving at the venue from Friday 29 October.

On 3 December, as part of the Government's reintroduction of measures, all nightclubs were to close from 7 December amid concerns of the Omicron variant.

On 21 January 2022, Taoiseach Micheál Martin announced the easing of almost all COVID-19 restrictions, with nightclubs to reopen with no social distancing or vaccine certificates requirements.

On 23 April, the first full-capacity concert at Croke Park since the COVID-19 pandemic took place, with Ed Sheeran kicking off his world tour singing for over 80,000 fans.

=== Painting and sculpture ===
The National Gallery of Ireland cancelled its exhibition "Irish Horse". Its exhibitions on Spanish Golden Age painter Bartolomé Esteban Murillo (a series of works shown for the first time in decades), as well as those on rare Italian seventeenth and eighteenth century travel guidebooks and Irish botanical art, were interrupted by the government-imposed closure.

=== Stage and screen ===
In mid-April, Fís Éireann/Screen Ireland announced new support measures that aim to ease the impact of COVID-19 on the Irish television and film industry. Filming in Ireland of the Ridley Scott-directed The Last Duel was also supposed to begin in April but was put on "indefinite hiatus" shortly beforehand; numerous media reports referenced sightings of one of its actors, Matt Damon of the U.S., in Ireland after his country banned travel from Europe. Damon gave a radio interview in mid-May before departing Ireland and flying back to his country. On 27 April, it was announced that the 2020 edition of the Rose of Tralee would be cancelled for the first time in its 61-year history. On 31 May 2021, it was announced that the 2021 edition of the Rose of Tralee would be cancelled for the second year in a row.

== Communications ==
In the wake of fake news and rumours circulating online—including claims that a military-enforced "status red lockdown" would be enforced from 11:00 on Monday 16 March—ministers and the head of the Defence Forces made calls for people to be more responsible with the information they shared online and to only trust reputable sources.

An Post indefinitely postponed its price increase on stamps (due to have started on 18 March), announced earlier opening hours on Fridays for OAPs to get their pensions and introduced measures to limit contact between customers and staff, including pausing the need for recipients of parcels to provide a signature. The postal service provider also distributed two free postcards to each household, for those wishing to contact others elsewhere in the country. Delayed deliveries of parcels and letters, and a request for children to be kept away as well. The government ruled out asking An Post to provide a moratorium on television licence payments.

Telecommunications company eir indefinitely postponed its intended introduction on 31 March of subscription charges for the eircom.net email service, following criticism of its timing (though the company had announced the charge in February, before the virus's impact on Ireland was known).

Surveys taking place as part of Ireland's national broadband plan, such as ongoing works at one of its key sites in Cavan, continued as of early April.

== Outbreaks ==
=== Construction sites ===
From 20 July to 24 July 2020, a number of construction sites in Dublin closed down temporarily due to workers testing positive for COVID-19.

On 20 July, a construction site on Townsend Street in Dublin City Centre operated by John Paul Construction closed down temporarily at the request of the Health Service Executive after over 20 workers tested positive for COVID-19. On 23 July, a second construction site in Grangegorman, Dublin operated by John Sisk & Son and FCC closed down temporarily after a worker tested positive for COVID-19. On 24 July, a third construction site on South Great George's Street, Dublin operated by the Elliott Group closed down temporarily after a worker tested positive for COVID-19.

On 5 October, the Electricity Supply Board (ESB) confirmed an outbreak of COVID-19 on a construction site in Dublin.

On 22 April 2021, an outbreak of at least 70 COVID-19 cases was confirmed at Intel's construction site in Leixlip, County Kildare.

=== Processing plants and direct provision centres ===
On 4 May 2020, Ireland's then agriculture minister (the first of the year's five) revealed that six meat processing plants had been shuttered due to outbreaks of the coronavirus illness, and nineteen more were affected, bringing the total to 23.

On 30 July, a significant number of cases announced by the Department of Health was associated with a cluster of 53 staff at a dog food factory in Naas, County Kildare which stopped production on 25 July. On 14 August, the factory announced that the phased reopening of its plant had been agreed with the Health Service Executive and the Health and Safety Authority following a meeting on 11 August.

On 4 August, a food processing plant in Tullamore, County Offaly carried out a deep clean of the premises and was scheduled to close after seven workers tested positive for COVID-19. On 10 August, the food processing plant suspended all processing operations and closed following criticism it received for not doing so. On 14 August, the food processing plant announced that the Health Service Executive and the Health and Safety Authority had approved the reopening of its plant in Tullamore.

On 5 August, a food factory in Timahoe, County Kildare suspended all processing operations and closed following confirmation of 80 cases of COVID-19. On 19 August, a further eight workers at the food factory tested positive for COVID-19.

On 11 August, following a meeting of the Cabinet sub-committee on COVID-19, Taoiseach Micheál Martin announced that weekly COVID-19 testing would begin at meat processing plants and residents of direct provision centres.

On 12 August, a mushroom factory in Golden, County Tipperary suspended its operations after one staff member tested positive for COVID-19 before other close contacts also tested positive. On 17 August, the mushroom factory remained closed, with 29 staff members having tested positive for COVID-19. The owners of the factory announced they were concerned at the level of asymptomatic cases identified after mass testing over the previous weekend.

On 17 August, a case of COVID-19 was confirmed in a meat processing plant in Cahir, County Tipperary. On 26 August, the meat processing plant announced that 22 members of staff, along with 16 close contacts, had tested positive for COVID-19.

On 18 August, four workers at a Glanbia dairy processing plant in Ballitore, County Kildare tested positive for COVID-19.

On 24 August, 15 employees tested positive for COVID-19 at three meat plants around the country: 9 in Cahir, County Tipperary, 2 in Clones, County Monaghan and 4 in Clara, County Offaly.

On 9 September, the Health Service Executive postponed the COVID-19 testing of staff in meat processing plants.

On 11 September, the Department of Justice and the Health Service Executive confirmed that widespread COVID-19 testing would begin in all direct provision centres from 12 September.

On 25 January 2021, a meat processing plant in Bunclody, County Wexford confirmed 42 cases of COVID-19 following screening of all staff on 15 January.

On 3 February, an outbreak of COVID-19 at a direct provision centre in Newbridge, County Kildare was confirmed.

== Crime ==
The Garda Síochána (Irish police) announced differences to the way its shifts would operate to allow for increased presence of its officers in public, that hundreds of student gardaí would be sworn in to the force earlier than would otherwise have been the case and that more than 200 private hire cars would be deployed to assist vulnerable citizens in rural areas after being branded with the Garda sign and crest. In addition, a supply of masks would be maintained to distribute within the prison system if inmates showed symptoms of the SARS‑CoV‑2 virus. It also set up a national COVID-19 unit located at its Phoenix Park headquarters.

Assaults of coughing and spitting were common. They occurred nationwide, in the capital city Dublin, and were also recorded in the counties of Cavan, Cork, Donegal, Dublin, Kildare, Roscommon, Sligo, Tipperary, and Waterford.

A series of riots began in Dublin, Ireland on the night of 4 June 2021 over the June bank holiday weekend, in which glass bottles and other objects were thrown at members of the Garda Síochána. A number of public order incidents began when Gardaí attempted to disperse large organised groups congregating at a number of locations including South William Street, St Stephen's Green and Temple Bar Square.

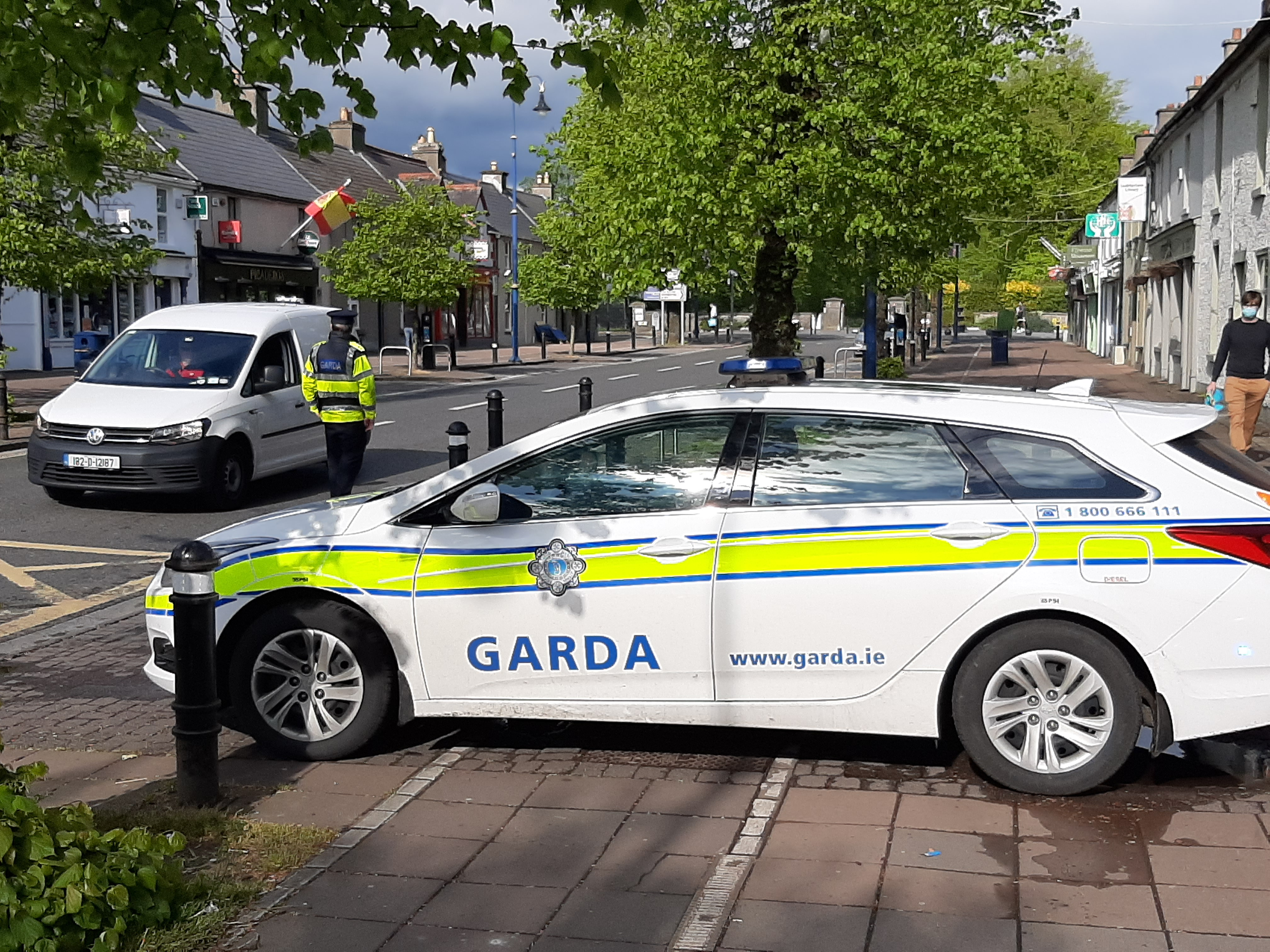
A Garda checkpoint stopping motorists on the eve of a public holiday weekend to investigate if any are violating the restrictions on travel

Operation Fanacht (fan-akt; Irish: fanacht, "staying") commenced in April 2020. Its purpose was to enforce travel restrictions which had then only recently been imposed to combat the virus. The Garda Síochána described it as follows in its statement announcing the end of the operation: "Every day of Operation Fanacht, An Garda Síochána conducted 150 permanent checkpoints on major routes, over 500 shorter and mobile checkpoints, as well as a large number of high visibility patrols at tourist locations, natural beauty spots, and parks and beaches". Also as part of Operation Fanacht, the Garda Air Support Unit (GASU) confirmed its helicopters were conducting aerial surveillance of locations suspected as being used by large numbers of people while not adhering to social distancing.

Operation Navigation commenced in July 2020 when gardaí began conducting checks of licensed premises throughout the country to check if they were adhering to the public health guidelines for COVID-19. From 3 July to 12 July, Garda Síochána conducted 2,785 checks on licensed premises nationwide.

== Cruise ships ==
In February—before any case was reported in Ireland—two dual Irish citizens with Germany tested positive for COVID-19 during the outbreak on the cruise ship Diamond Princess and were treated in hospital in Japan, while nine Irish citizens were on MS Westerdam at Sihanoukville off the coast of Cambodia, seven of whom were being monitored for signs of the virus.

In mid-March, it was revealed that several Irish citizens were aboard the cruise ship Celebrity Eclipse to which Chile denied entry, though no illnesses were reported at the time.

In late March, it was revealed that as many as a dozen Irish citizens were aboard the Holland America cruise ship MS Zaandam which left Buenos Aires on 7 March and which Panama denied transit through the Panama Canal after countless passengers contracted the virus and some died. RTÉ News reported one Irish family as saying: "The passengers in this cruise are largely in the over-65 category. They are all confined to their cabins and are all extremely anxious, as you can imagine". Asymptomatic passengers, including some Irish, were transferred from Zaandam to its sister-ship MS Rotterdam after passing a medical test. The Zaandam docked at the Fort Lauderdale seaport of Port Everglades in the U.S. state of Florida in early April.

== Economy ==
The COVID-19 pandemic has had a deep impact on the Irish economy, leading it into a recession. Essential public health measures announced by the Government of Ireland to contain the spread of COVID-19 resulted in the largest monthly increase in unemployment in the history of Ireland during March 2020. By 24 April, there were more than one million people in receipt of support interventions to the labour market, including those in receipt of the COVID-19 Pandemic Unemployment Payment and the COVID-19 Temporary Wage Subsidy Scheme. While there were job losses in all sectors, individuals working in tourism, hospitality, food and retail seen the largest job losses.

== Education ==
On 12 March 2020, all schools, colleges and childcare facilities in the Republic of Ireland were shut down in response to the COVID-19 pandemic. The shutdown resulted in the cancellation of the Leaving Certificate and Junior Certificate examinations, as well as all Irish language summer courses in the Gaeltacht.

In 2021, the Junior Certificate examination and all Irish language summer courses in the Gaeltacht were cancelled for a second year running.

== Health and nursing home care ==
=== Hospitals ===
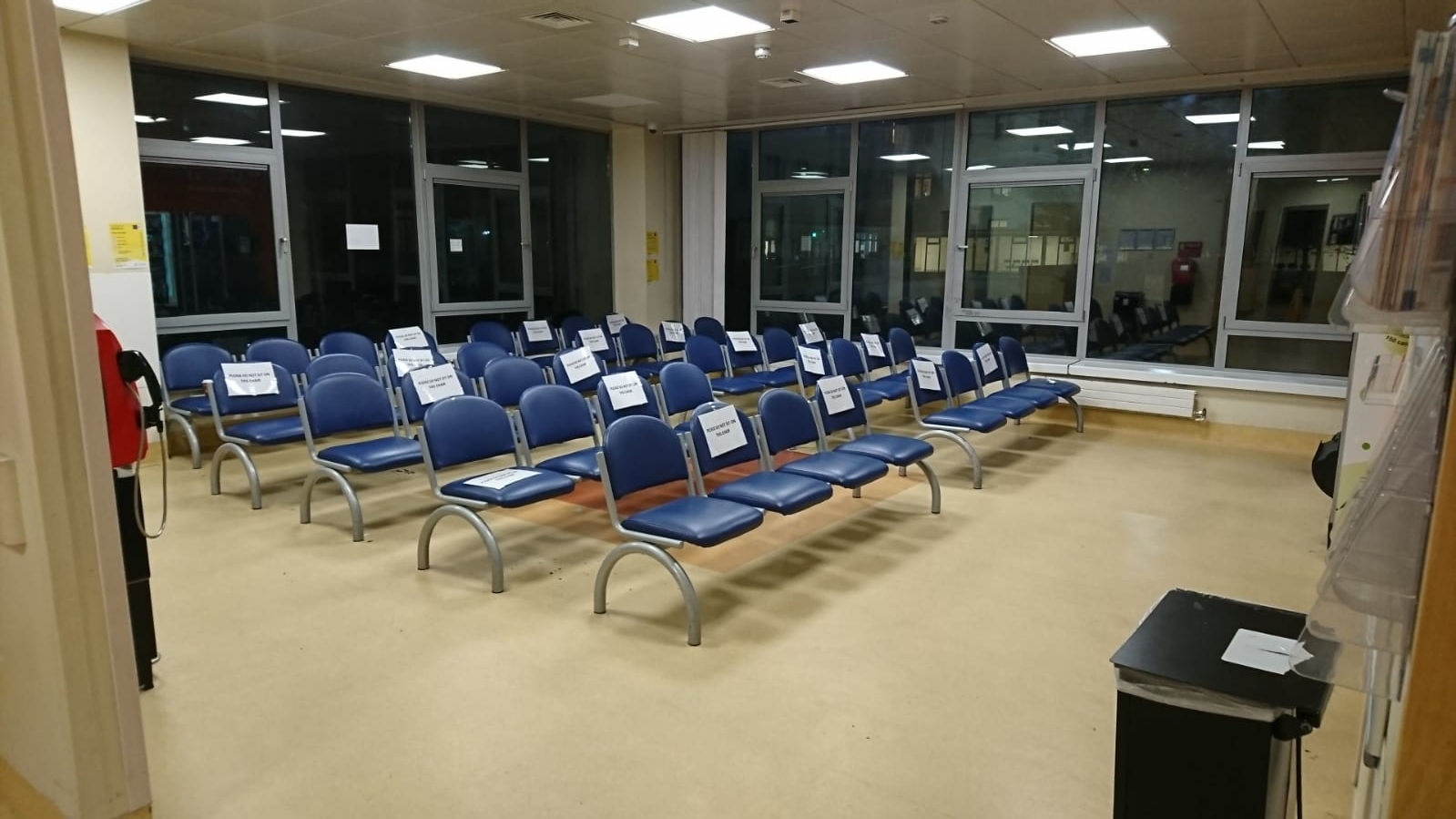
An empty waiting room in Connolly Hospital in Dublin

Non-urgent hospital appointments and non-emergency surgery were cancelled to allow hospitals to cope with the anticipated rise in COVID-19 cases.

Many hospitals placed stricter visitor restrictions in the hope of stopping the spread of the virus.

As cases emerged, hospitals announced that visiting restrictions and staff entered self-isolation in enormous numbers. The Mater Hospital in Dublin announced on 6 March that all visitors were banned, with the exception of "those who are visiting patients in critical care, vulnerable young adults, psychiatric patients or those whose loved ones are receiving end of life care" (though all children were barred). Also on 6 March, six hospitals in the province of Munster—University Hospital Limerick, University Maternity Hospital Limerick, Ennis Hospital, Nenagh Hospital, St John's Hospital and Croom Orthopaedic Hospital—announced visitors were banned and that they would be cancelling all elective surgeries and outpatient appointments (with exceptions in such cases as caesarean sections, chemotherapy and dialysis) for the following Monday and Tuesday. This announcement came after the attendance of a patient at University Hospital Limerick's emergency department two days earlier, who was later confirmed as COVID-19 positive, leading staff to self-isolate and the emergency department to be closed for three hours so that it could be deep cleaned. And again on 6 March—this time in Cork University Hospital, also in Munster—more than 60 members of staff self-isolated after a case of COVID-19 emerged there.

On 29 March, the HSE stated that no hospital in Ireland had then reached intensive care unit (ICU) capacity. On 8 April, Dublin's Mater Hospital had reached ICU capacity.

In March, a blind woman—whose GP had referred her for assessment at a cardiac unit—was mistaken for a COVID-19 patient and spent time in a COVID-19 ward before doctors realised their mistake.

On 24 March, the state announced it would take control of all private hospital facilities for the duration of the pandemic.

A memo sent to staff at Cavan General Hospital on the afternoon of 8 April confirmed 70 doctors and nurses working there had been struck down by the virus. A consultant based at Beaumont Hospital in Dublin informed Today with Seán O'Rourke that staff from Beaumont had been sent to Cavan and that several dozen other medical staff working at Cavan General Hospital, including most senior medical staff and nearly half the hospital's surgical team, had been forced to self-isolate. Less than three weeks after the outbreak at its main hospital, HSE data confirmed that Cavan (a predominantly rural north-midlands county with a population of less than 80,000) had overtaken the capital city Dublin as the epicentre of the virus in Ireland. Minister for Business, Enterprise and Innovation Heather Humphreys, a TD for Cavan–Monaghan, responded to claims that the high number of cases in Cavan and the neighbouring county of Monaghan was due to visitors from across the border, telling Virgin Media News in late-April: "The level of infection in Cavan and Monaghan has nothing to do with people coming from across the border. In fact, there were four residential nursing homes that had outbreaks plus there were also outbreaks among the staff in Cavan General Hospital".

In mid-April, the High Court made temporary orders which permitted a hospital to isolate an octogenarian patient with "an impaired capacity" who had tested positive for the virus while being treated for a physical injury, and whose actions (such as not keeping to his hospital room, coughing openly when wandering around the hospital, and his inability—due to his condition—to practise the appropriate hand hygiene) the hospital thought endangered the health of others (as well as himself, with concerns raised that other patients frustrated by his actions might pose a risk to his own safety). The hospital itself applied to the High Court and the patient's family supported the hospital's stance.

Persons of elderly inclination residing in the part of the country from the centre of Dublin city southwards towards north County Wexford could avail of a visit from an emergency department doctor if they wished to avoid hospitals overrun with the virus.

On 29 April, Clonakilty Community Hospital confirmed that nine of its residents had died since 1 April, reducing the number of residents there by about one tenth.

The former tuberculosis wards in St Mary's Hospital, Phoenix Park, were renovated and were to begin accepting COVID-19 patients from 11 May.

On 10 May, RTÉ News reported that BreastCheck mammograms declined by 100% in April 2020 on April 2019, while CervicalCheck samples declined by 96% in April 2020 on April 2019, with the HSE explaining that both cancer screening programmes had been paused in March due to the virus and that the small number of CervicalCheck samples analysed in April had been taken in March. On 24 June, the Health Service Executive announced that it hopes to clear the backlog of suspended CervicalCheck screening tests by October 2020, after being suspended since 27 March.

On 13 April, St John of God Hospital, a psychiatric facility in Stillorgan, released a statement saying that half of all admissions over the previous month related to the virus, among whom were people suffering from severe social isolation and healthcare staff overburdened by their efforts to treat patients who had contracted the virus.

An Economic and Social Research Institute (ESRI) study released in mid-May showed more than 45% less attendances at emergency departments each day during the week concluding at 29 March than in the week concluding 1 March, with the deduction in attendances more noticeable in those younger in age.

On 7 June, HSE Chief Executive Paul Reid announced that 10 hospitals in Ireland had no COVID-19 cases.

On 11 August, a ward at Naas General Hospital closed to new admissions after an outbreak of COVID-19 was confirmed on 10 August.

On 14 August, national hospital waiting list numbers published by the National Treatment Purchase Fund reached over 819,000 for the first time.

On 18 August, an Outbreak Control Team was established at University Hospital Limerick after one patient and one member of staff tested positive for COVID-19.

On 25 September, an outbreak of COVID-19 was confirmed on a ward at the Regional Hospital, Mullingar, County Westmeath after a number of patients tested positive for COVID-19.

On 24 October, two wards including a psychiatric unit at Naas General Hospital was locked down after an outbreak of COVID-19 was confirmed which infected 9 patients and 18 staff.

On 20 November, 22 patients in a South Dublin hospital tested positive for COVID-19 after an outbreak emerged in the hospital.

On 24 November, the Health Service Executive (HSE) confirmed that outpatient appointments were cancelled at a hospital in Loughlinstown, Dublin after an outbreak of COVID-19 of 31 patients was confirmed.

On 13 January 2021, the Irish Nurses and Midwives Organisation (INMO) called for the Government to declare a national emergency and for all private hospital capacity to be fully nationalised into the public healthcare system as the number of hospitalisations doubled the peak of April 2020.

On 18 January, the number of patients with COVID-19 being treated in hospitals around the country reached a record 2,023, with 200 in ICUs and over 400 people receiving high-grade ventilation and respiratory support.

On 23 August, visitors to University Hospital Galway were being asked to come only if "absolutely necessary" as the hospital dealt with a COVID-19 outbreak and record numbers at its emergency department.

On 27 March 2022, latest figures showed that there were 1,569 patients in hospitals with COVID-19, the highest figure in 14 months.

The universal use of face masks in hospitals and other healthcare settings was relaxed from 19 April 2023.

=== Nurses ===
Nurses often returned to their cars after working in hospitals to find that their vehicles had been clamped. On 18 March, the Irish Nurses and Midwives Organisation (INMO) raised the issue with the HSE. The following day, HSE chief executive officer Paul Reid ordered the immediate suspension of staff parking charges.

In April, Dogs Trust's Dublin centre launched a scheme to give temporary foster care to the dogs of medical professionals too busy to tend to their pets. The Canine Centre, a dog grooming and care business in the south Dublin suburb of Churchtown, also offered a similar service when gardaí permitted it to reopen to take care of dogs belonging to nurses, doctors and HSE administrators.

However, similar efforts to take care of the children of healthcare workers ran aground. After launching on 7 May, Minister for Children and Youth Affairs Katherine Zappone announced its cancellation one week later on 14 May. The scheme had been much anticipated. Its cancellation was much criticised.

On 23 June, the Irish Nurses and Midwives Organisation (INMO) announced that Ireland has the highest COVID-19 infection rates among healthcare workers in the world.

Raymond Garrett, honorary consul of the Filipino consulate, reckoned nurses who had returned to the Philippines had become stranded there for many months (as the Southeast Asian country's airports had shut in March), thus further depleting Ireland's stock of available nurses.

On 16 January 2021, the Department of Health announced the suspension of all nursing and midwifery student placements for two weeks due to the impact of the COVID-19 pandemic on staffing levels. The next day on 17 January, the Irish Nurses and Midwives Organisation (INMO) called for further clarity on the decision to suspend nursery and midwifery student placements for two weeks.

On 19 January 2022, the Government agreed a plan to give frontline healthcare workers a once-off €1,000 tax free payment for their work during the pandemic and also agreed on an extra public holiday on 18 March in remembrance of people who died due to COVID-19.

=== Supplies ===
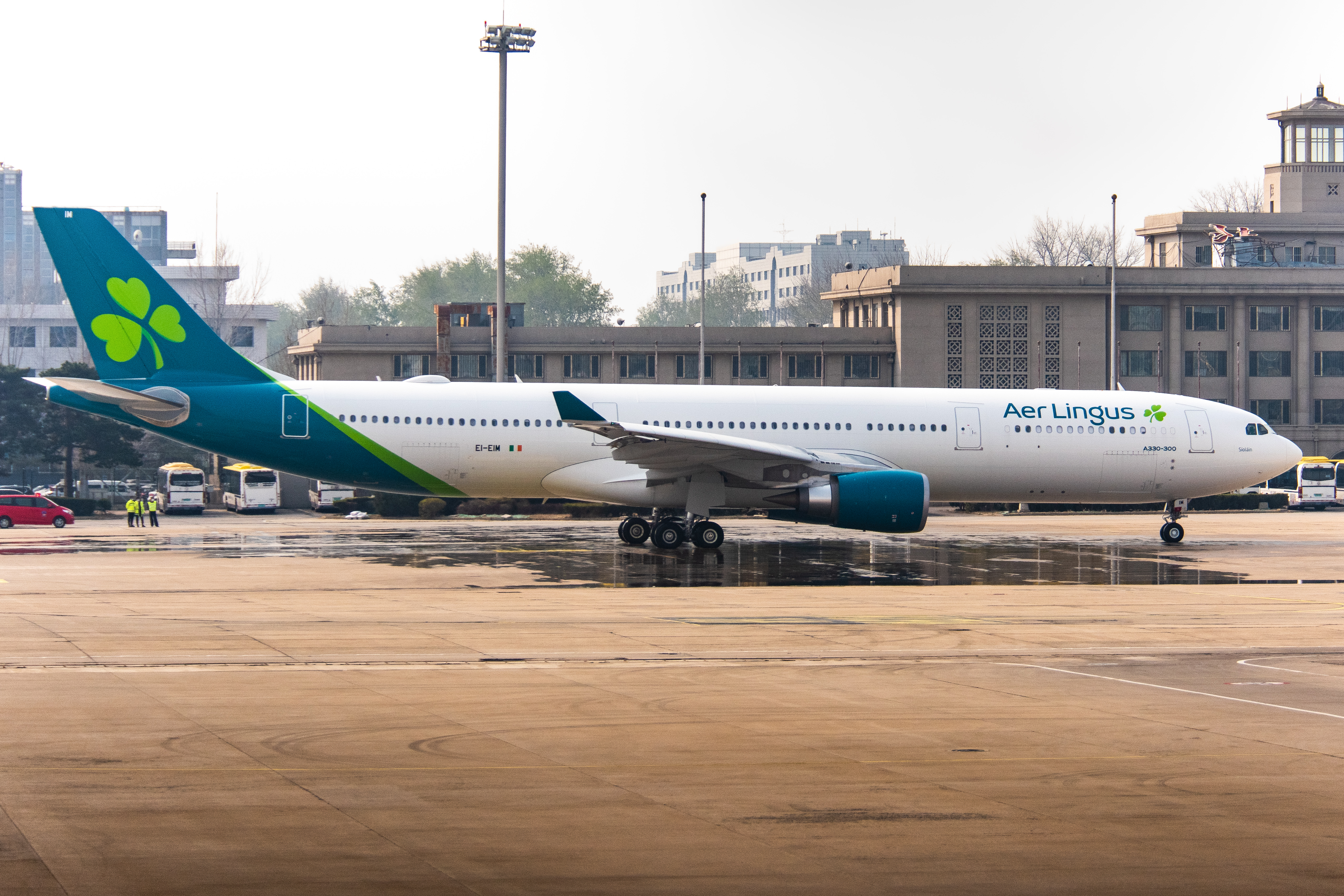
Aer Lingus began flying to Beijing in late March 2020 with their A330-300 fleet to collect personal protective equipment (PPE) for Irish healthcare workers.

A company making surgical face masks, for the global and local market, increased its production. Listoke Distillery in Drogheda (east of Ireland, north of Dublin) was repurposed to produce hand sanitiser. Moville-based clothing company Moville Clothing—which usually makes robes for barristers and clerics—began making surgical scrubs, with the assistance of donations from the public (organised by designer Edel McBride, who was prompted by annoyance at hearing that healthcare workers had to buy their own sanitary clothing). Public libraries lent their 3D printers to the making of face shields for healthcare workers. Engineers from Trinity College Dublin also brought several 3D printers to their houses to make face shields. The Irish Journal of Medical Science accepted a design for a low-cost facemask, not intended to replace PPE but as a "last resort".

In mid-March, Irish technology company Cliffrun Health—alongside staff at the Mater Hospital—launched a first of its kind system in which data such as blood pressure and temperature would be sent from a COVID-19 patient who had sent home to staff at the hospital, thus freeing beds for the more critically ill. Medical device company, the Inspire Team (based at the university in Galway), designed a system to enable for the first time the safe treatment of two patients with one ventilator; the system was made available for export internationally. Forklift manufacturer, Combilift (based in the north midlands town of Monaghan), designed a Combi-Ventilate splitter device intended to allow two patients to be treated together while also enabling medical professionals to control each person individually. Previously, the Health Service Executive (HSE) had begun stocking up on ventilators in anticipation of a possible surge in respiratory distress cases from the virus. However, in April, the Swords-based pharmaceutical service firm Narooma Ltd sued the HSE at the High Court over a contract breach, stating that a deal to purchase ventilators on behalf of the HSE and deliver them from the Far East in three shipments between 20 April and 15 May had been agreed at the close of March, but that the HSE had not honoured this and had not paid Narooma any of the money it was owed.

In mid-April, a spokesperson for Moon Jae-in disclosed that Bono had written to the President of South Korea asking for items including personal protective equipment (PPE) and diagnostic kits which he would pay for on behalf of Ireland.

Unsuitable PPE imported from China, such as gowns which did not cover the arms of their wearers, was delivered to COVID-19 testing centres, hospitals and ambulance units in Dublin, Donegal, Sligo, Galway and Limerick in late March and early April. Cork University Hospital's infectious disease unit began sending KN95 facemasks imported from China to Kinsale Community School, where students there were able to repair them and send them back to the hospital for use by staff. The HSE called Sullane Valley Manufacturing to ask if they could mend Cork University Hospital's supply of gowns; workers with the Cork-based fabric company attached hook-and-loop fasteners (i.e. velcro) instead of zippers, removed some legs and attached the legs to the sleeves of the gowns.

On 10 June, the world's largest aircraft landed at Shannon Airport with a consignment of PPE imported from China for the Health Service Executive (HSE). The consignment of 900,000 medical gowns of PPE is the largest ever ordered by Ireland, and will last 12.5 days under the current levels of demand.

=== Recruitment ===
At a press conference on the evening of 16 March, Minister for Health Simon Harris said more staff would be required in hospitals nationwide and a recruitment drive was launched on 17 March. On 17 March, Harris announced free consultations for COVID-19 testing alongside the recruitment drive to hire more healthcare workers, including those retired and working part-time. The HSE asked all healthcare professionals (and even non-healthcare professionals) to register to "be on call for Ireland" if they had not already done so. One of those who immediately signed up was Róisin Doherty, the wife of Sinn Féin politician Pearse. A former nurse, she had later become a teacher but found herself out of work when the schools shut. Others came back from abroad. On 5 April, The Irish Times reported on another high-profile applicant: it said that Taoiseach Leo Varadkar—in response to the recruitment drive—had rejoined the Medical Council the previous month, with the intention of working one day per week. A spokesperson confirmed that Varadkar intended to "help out even in a small way" in "areas that are within his scope of practice".

=== Nursing homes ===
Nursing homes placed restrictions on visitors from early March and banned all children.

Nine residents of the Maryborough Centre, St Fintan's Hospital in Portlaoise, died over the Easter weekend (eight confirmed as COVID-19 positive), reducing the number of residents there by one third.

In mid-April, volunteers from the Irish Red Cross assisted the HSE and Civil Defence in evacuating 19 residents from a care home in Ballyshannon, County Donegal, and their transfer to St Joseph's Community Hospital in Stranorlar, when staff were struck down by illness.

On the night of 16 April, the HSE confirmed to The Irish Times that 11 residents of Ireland's biggest publicly owned home for the elderly—St Mary's Hospital in Phoenix Park—had died after contracting the virus since 2 April. On 25 April, the HSE confirmed that 10 more residents had since died, bringing the total deaths there to 21.

While discussing the virus's prevalence in the border counties of Cavan and Monaghan on Virgin Media News in late-April, Minister for Business, Enterprise and Innovation Heather Humphreys—a TD representing the Cavan–Monaghan constituency—said that "four residential nursing homes" had experienced outbreaks of the virus.

Deaths were reported in nursing homes in the Dublin suburbs of Castleknock, and Milltown, as well as in the towns of Belmullet, Dundalk and Portarlington.

Daniel O'Donnell did open-air concerts for elderly residents of care homes and hospitals around his native County Donegal; the residents watched the performances from their windows. O'Donnell acquired his own little loudspeaker for the performances and said: "It passed the time for me, takes nothing out of me and gives a wee bit of a change of atmosphere to those people who are in the hospitals and various places".

On 21 July, the Health Information and Quality Authority announced that half of nursing homes inspected by the authority were not following proper infection prevention and control regulations.

On 5 October, patients and residents began self-isolating in a nursing home in Portlaoise, County Laois after 18 people tested positive for COVID-19. On 6 October, 31 positive cases of COVID-19 were confirmed in the nursing home with 21 cases among residents and 10 cases among staff. On 12 October, three residents in the nursing home died.

On 7 October, a nursing home in Convoy, County Donegal confirmed 30 positive cases of COVID-19.

On 21 October, a nursing home in Moate, County Westmeath confirmed an outbreak of COVID-19 after a number of residents tested positive for COVID-19.

On 22 October, a nursing home in Ahascragh, Ballinasloe, County Galway appealed to the Health Service Executive (HSE) for emergency staff after two residents admitted to Portiuncula University Hospital tested positive for COVID-19, which resulted in 42 confirmed cases of COVID-19 and one death.

On 4 November, an outbreak of COVID-19 was confirmed in a nursing home in County Kerry after 19 residents and staff tested positive for COVID-19.

On 20 November, the Health Service Executive (HSE) confirmed that six residents of a County Kerry nursing home died after testing positive for COVID-19.

On 25 November, the HSE started to move residents out of a nursing home, where 8 residents died, in Listowel, County Kerry after an outbreak of COVID-19 was confirmed.

On 22 January 2021, the HSE confirmed that 11 residents of a nursing home in North County Dublin died after testing positive for COVID-19.

On 1 February, a nursing home in Tuam, County Galway appealed for help from qualified nurses following the deaths of 12 residents due to COVID-19. On the same day, it was announced that more than 30 residents of 4 Cork nursing homes and a community hospital in Kerry died in the previous two weeks following COVID-19 outbreaks.

On 12 March, nine residents at a nursing home with an outbreak of COVID-19 in Trim, County Meath died after the first doses of a COVID-19 vaccine were administered there.

On 12 November, it was announced that visitors to nursing homes would be required to show a COVID-19 vaccination certificate, a HSE vaccination record or another proof of immunity before entering the premises.

=== Health Service Executive ransomware attack ===
On 14 May 2021, the Health Service Executive (HSE) suffered a major ransomware cyberattack which caused all of its IT systems nationwide to be shut down. It was the most significant cybercrime attack on an Irish state agency and the largest known attack against a health service computer system.

The ransomware cyber attack had a significant impact on hospital appointments across the country, with many appointments cancelled including all outpatient and radiology services. The COVID-19 testing referral system was made offline, requiring individuals with suspected cases to attend walk-in COVID-19 testing centres, rather than attend an appointment. The COVID-19 vaccination registration portal was also made offline, but was later back online in the evening.

== Mass media ==
The Monday night current affairs television series Claire Byrne Live on 9 March 2020 was filmed with a reduced studio audience as an effort at social distancing; seven days later, on 16 March 2020, there was no studio audience at all and presenter Claire Byrne conducted interviews with guests—such as Minister for Health Simon Harris—live from her garden shed, as she had been advised to self-isolate. On 23 March, ahead of her second week broadcasting to the nation from her shed, Byrne confirmed she had tested positive for COVID-19; the result had come as a shock to her as she had not had a temperature and assumed she had caught the common cold—though, as the week went on, her symptoms worsened, she had some difficulty breathing and experienced tiredness. Byrne's diagnosis had been hinted at two days earlier when a then unnamed RTÉ staff member was reported to be COVID-19 positive. On 6 April, Byrne returned to filming Claire Byrne Live in the RTÉ 1 studio.

On 15 March 2020, The Irish Times announced that its building on Tara Street in Dublin would close immediately as a staff member had just been confirmed to have tested COVID-19 positive, though the paper remained in print and its website continued to be updated.

On 18 March, Newstalk radio presenter and former medical doctor Ciara Kelly announced that she had tested COVID-19 positive, though she was no longer practising, had taken precautions and had not been abroad. She had continued to present the Monday and Tuesday editions of her programme, Lunchtime Live, from the hot press (a type of Irish cupboard) in her home, and Mick Heaney of The Irish Times described her Wednesday programme as "a compelling show, remarkably so considering it was hosted by an ill woman sitting in an airing cupboard".

Also on 20 March, Ryan Tubridy received a live televised "mock" COVID-19 test on The Late Late Show. Five days later, Tubridy did not turn up for his morning radio show, citing a "persistent cough"; Oliver Callan deputised. Two days later, RTÉ announced that Miriam O'Callaghan would present that evening's edition of The Late Late Show, the first time in the programme's 58-year history that the role fell to a woman, the first time since his father died in 2013 that Tubridy missed a programme and the first time since Frank Hall's short-lived stint in the mid-1960s that a regular host had missed two programmes overall. On Monday 30 March, Tubridy again did not turn up for his radio show, with Callan continuing to cover for him; later that day, Tubridy announced he had tested positive for COVID-19. On Thursday 3 April, RTÉ confirmed O'Callaghan would again present The Late Late Show, the first time in programme history that the regular host missed two consecutive episodes. On 7 April, Tubridy returned to present his morning radio show.

On 26 March, RTÉ began seeking participants for a planned new reality TV series, Operation Covid Nation, the title of which was based on its weight-loss programme Operation Transformation. Such was the outcry—with people enraged at the insensitivity of the idea—that RTÉ ran a different programme instead, with a different title, and presenter Kathryn Thomas—who also owns a weight loss and fitness business—spoke of her disappointment that "it had nothing to do with weight loss, which we are associated with".

On 9 April, the virus claimed the Fora website, which was shut by the parent company it shared with TheJournal.ie due to a decline in advertising revenue prompting the parent to reduce its costs.

The National Lottery cancelled its weekly game show Winning Streak and withdrew scratchcards from shops. Filming of Fair City ceased, and episodes shown twice weekly instead of the normal four. The last episode aired on Easter Day. TG4, deprived of its live Gaelic games coverage, aired past matches instead. The channel also announced its intention to show—from 1 May—matches from the 1986 FIFA World Cup (including the final and Argentina v England), as well as matches from the 1982, 1990 and 1994 tournaments. On 22 May, TG4 announced another schedule of past football, hurling and camogie matches for the month of June. RTÉ Sport did similar; after showing every goal scored at the 2014 and 2018 FIFA World Cups, it announced over the Easter period its intention to broadcast classic football, hurling, rugby, hockey and soccer games (including from the UEFA Champions League and highlights of the national team's UEFA Euro 2016 experience), as well as documentaries such as Micko and Players of the Faithful.

Broadcaster Noel Cunningham held the title Donegal Person of the Year for a second year as his successor could not be arranged due to the virus.

The arrival of the virus also impacted regional and local media. On 11 March, Highland Radio announced the postponement of a concert with Daniel O'Donnell, which had been scheduled for 18 March, to commemorate its thirtieth birthday. On 20 March, Celtic Media Group announced it would make staff temporarily redundant. On 9 May, North Dublin Publications Ltd—partially owned by Celtic Media Group and publisher of the Dublin freesheets, the Northside People and the Southside People—told its employees it would be shutting and that it wished to have a liquidator appointed. Dozens of new local radio stations sprung up in the wake of the virus's arrival.

The state broadcaster, RTÉ, repeated its epic 30-hour broadcast of the full text of James Joyce's novel Ulysses for the first time in 38 years on RTÉ Radio 1 Extra on 16 June 2020. The decision to repeat the broadcast was partly influenced by the quarantine introduced in Ireland to limit the spread of COVID-19.

On 20 November, RTÉ apologised after several top news presenters and correspondents, including Bryan Dobson, David McCullagh, Miriam O'Callaghan, Eileen Dunne and Paul Cunningham, were photographed at a retirement party at RTÉ headquarters where social distancing was not fully observed. Taoiseach Micheál Martin described the photographs as "very disappointing". A month later, a health and safety review conducted by RTÉ into the gathering found that five breaches of COVID-19 protocols occurred, with up to 40 people present at the time.

== Politics ==
The COVID-19 pandemic has impacted and affected the political system of the Republic of Ireland, causing suspensions of legislative activities and isolation of multiple politicians due to fears of spreading the virus. Several politicians have tested positive for COVID-19 in 2020 and 2021.

== Religion ==
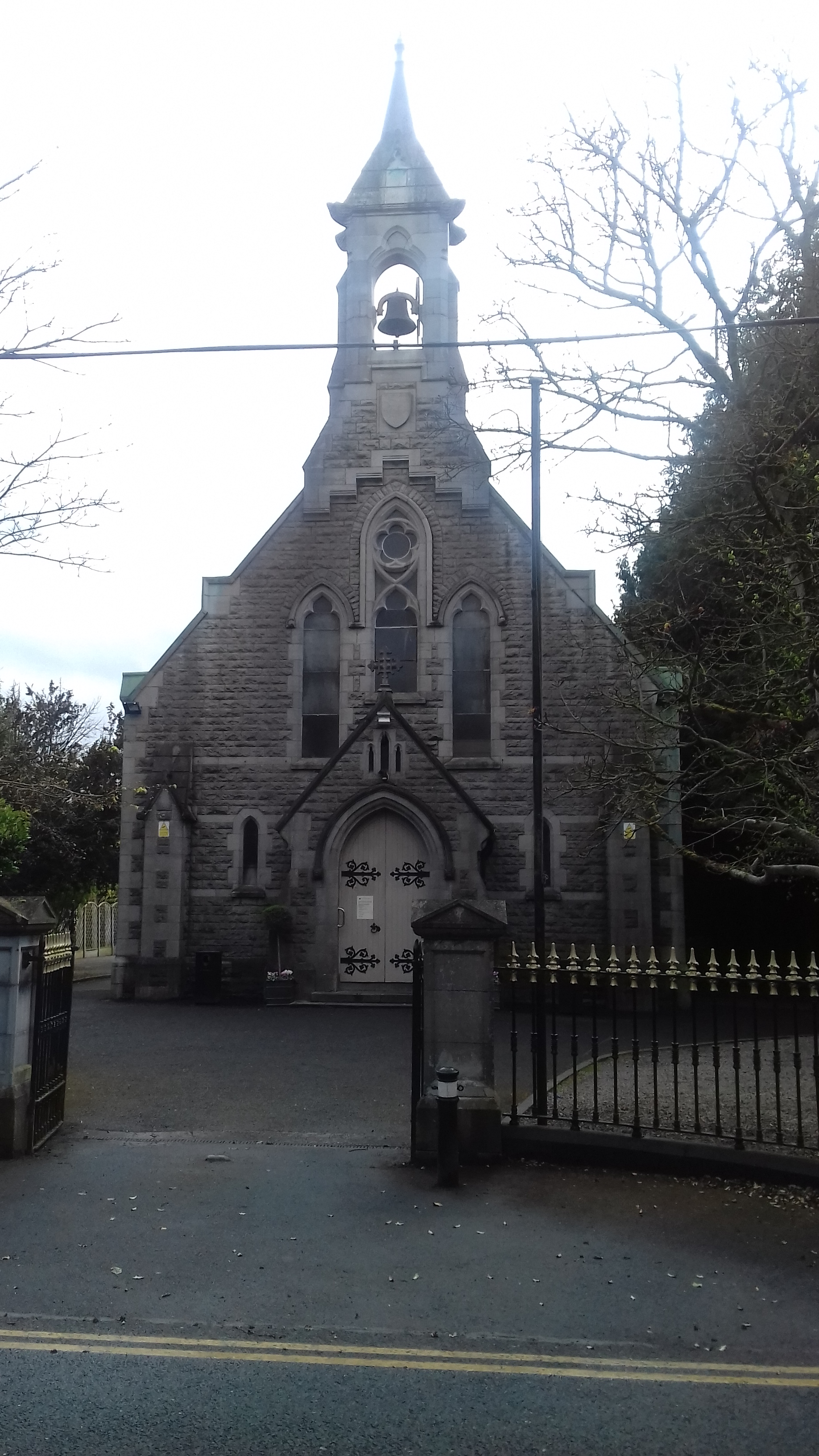
Notice pinned to St Mochta's church in Porterstown saying the church is closed

The Irish Catholic Bishops' Conference issued a statement on 12 March, following the Taoiseach's Washington announcement on limitations to public gatherings. Among the pastoral directions given were reductions in the number of people attending congregations to the less than 100 that Varadkar had advised. Thus, Irish Catholics were permitted to forgo the obligation "to physically attend Sunday Mass", particularly if they were elderly or had underlying health conditions known to be worsened by infection with the virus. Bishops advised that members of the congregation should be informed of how they might "participate in Mass via local radio and online". Holy water fonts would be emptied; hand sanitiser made available at each entrance of the church; the sign of peace expressed preferably through other means than the tradition of hand shaking; the Eucharist to be taken in the hand and not the mouth; only one person to drink from the chalice; priests to avail of cotton buds or surgical gloves while engaged in the anointing of the sick; priests to make the sign of the cross over the baby during baptism without touching the child's head; no shaking the hands of the bereaved during funerals.

RTÉ Television started showing weekday morning Mass from St Eunan's Cathedral in Letterkenny.

On 30 March, spokesman for the Diocese of Killaloe (southwest Ireland) Fr Brendan Quinlivan said more than half of its priests were cocooning because they were elderly, including former Bishop of Killaloe Willie Walsh. The diocese also cancelled its annual pilgrimage to Lourdes.

Nearly half of priests in Dublin were cocooned in their homes, including the 74-year-old Archbishop Diarmuid Martin.

A pensioner began a daily protest against the shutting of churches at the closed front door of his local church in Rathcormac (in the Roman Catholic Diocese of Cloyne) in the north of County Cork. "I wouldn't be surprised if I'm [still] here on Christmas Eve or Christmas Day," he told the Irish Examiner in April.

For the first time in its 190-year history, the Cistercian abbey of Mount Melleray in County Waterford—whose monks follow the Rule of Saint Benedict—shut its doors to visitors. Fr Columban Heaney—the country's oldest Cistercian monk—died aged 96 but no one from outside could attend his funeral.

Archbishop of Dublin Diarmuid Martin told The Irish Times in late-April that there was "absolutely no way" Confirmations or First Communions would happen in Dublin in May and June.

Pupils from three primary schools in Lusk, County Dublin, made their First Communion at home with a webcam on Saturday 16 May.

A priest in Tallaght offered Confession in the car park of his local church.

The Reek Sunday Organising Forum cancelled its annual pilgrimage to the summit of Croagh Patrick because of the pandemic, with many stewards cocooning and public health experts advising against the event; thousands of pilgrims still made the climb when previously cancelled due to weather in 2015, leading organisers to request that they respect the 2020 cancellation.

Pilgrims on the Iveragh Peninsula in County Kerry (in the rural southwest of the country) gathered in search of a possible COVID-19 cure at holy wells dedicated to 6th-century St Fíonnán, who saved his people from a plague, and whose feast day occurs on 16 March (ahead of the earliest restrictions brought in to respond to the pandemic); "We like to take an aul' sup from the well and it's supposed to have some great healing properties", one resident told RTÉ News, another saying: "When I was young I remember a bottle of St Fíonnán's water was kept inside the front door. The older people used sprinkle it on themselves, on their animals and even on their potato garden".

On 19 June, Taoiseach Leo Varadkar announced that all churches and places of worship can reopen from 29 June, but attendance has been limited to 50 people.

On 20 June, Archbishop of Dublin Diarmuid Martin criticised the decision by the Government to limit the number of people allowed to attend public masses. Following the criticism, on 28 June, the administrators of three churches in Athlone including St. Peter's and Paul's Church, announced that they will not reopen for masses unless the 50 person limit on attendance is lifted. On 3 July, the Government of Ireland published new guidelines for churches and places of worship in order for them to safely accommodate more than 50 people at indoor services, including dividing the premises into subgroupings. On 12 July, the three churches in Athlone, originally closed due to the 50 person limit, announced that they will resume public masses from 20 July.

On 23 June, the annual summer pilgrimage to Lough Derg was suspended for the first time in 192 years. The pilgrimage also did not place in 2021.

On 10 August, the rector of Knock Shrine announced the closure of their venue on 15 August for the Feast of the Assumption due to recent spikes in COVID-19 cases in Ireland.

In late July 2021, a number of bishops had given the go-ahead for communions and confirmations to take place from August despite current public health guidance prohibiting such ceremonies to take place. On 6 August, it was revealed that the Government was planning to write to senior church leaders to outline plans to allow communions and confirmations to take place in September.

In the Church of Ireland, the Archbishop of Dublin and Bishop of Glendalough of the United Diocese of Dublin and Glendalough Most Reverend Michael Jackson issued "A Prayer in the Time of the Coronavirus". In some parishes, when permitted, the celebration of Holy Communion continued with the use of individual cups rather than a shared chalice.

== Sport ==
The COVID-19 pandemic has had a significant impact on the conduct of sports, affecting both competitive sports leagues and tournaments and recreational sports.

In March 2021, eir Sport's owner Eir announced it would not be bidding for the rights to sports events, as the closure of pubs in particular had made its business model difficult to sustain. However, eir Sport did vow to see out their existing contracts, including showing games from the 2021 National Hurling League and 2021 National Football League.

== Other ==
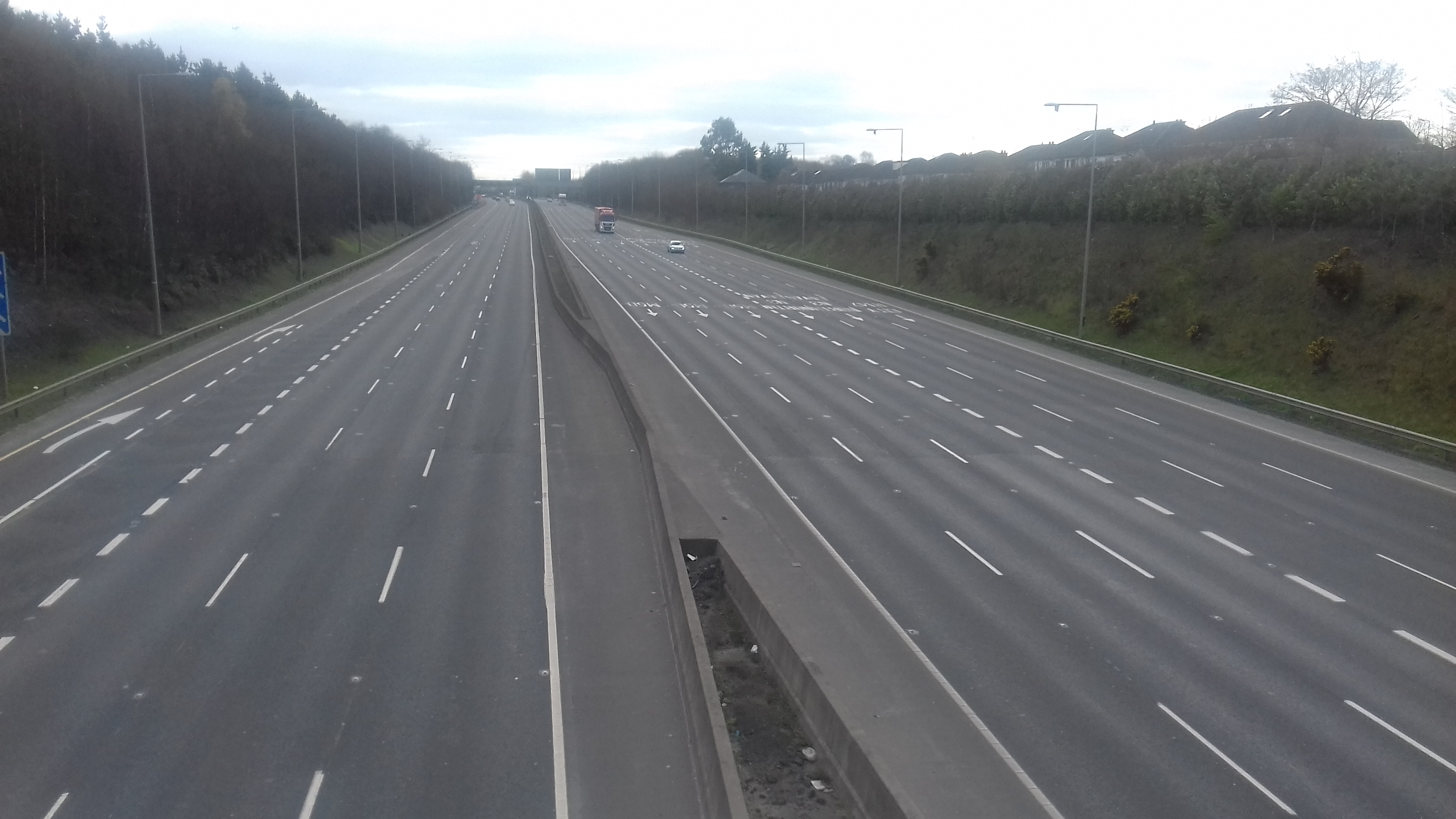
M50 motorway near Castleknock looking south. At 4 pm on 29 March 2020, almost no traffic to be seen.

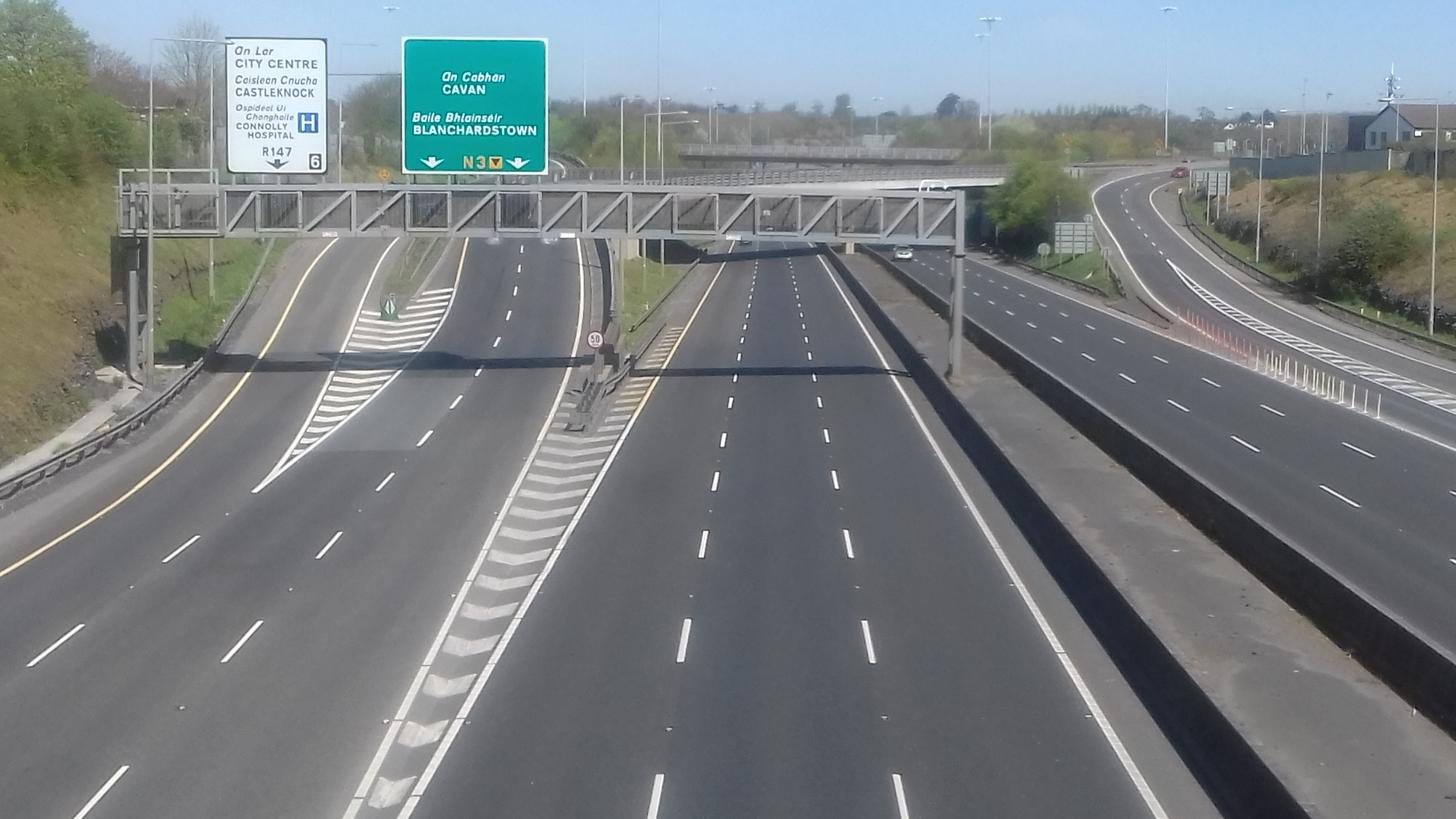
M50 motorway near Castleknock looking north. At 2 pm on 11 April 2020, almost no traffic to be seen.

Panic buying of hand sanitisers and face masks ensued as fear of the pandemic spread.

The inhabitants of Arranmore Island, off the coast of County Donegal, entered self-isolation and asked visitors to keep away. As of mid-April, there had been no reported cases on the island. In September, residents had a narrow escape after a member of Arranmore Island RNLI crew tested positive for COVID-19; the lifeboat and station were deep-cleaned.

Advice given by the European Society of Human Reproduction and Embryology (ESHRE) on 15 March prompted fertility clinics to shut, causing enormous disruption to IVF treatment. One woman on Morning Ireland compared herself to a horse: "We have been treated like brood mares".

On 22 March, Wicklow County Council closed all car parks and facilities in Glendalough after crowds gathered at food stalls there the previous day. On 11 April, Dún Laoghaire–Rathdown County Council shut the bathing spots of Seapoint, Sandycove and the Forty Foot to the public "until further notice", having earlier restricted parking at Sandycove, Vico, Killiney's beach and the seaside resort's railway station.

Members of the Reserve Defence Forces were guaranteed their full-time jobs for the first time, as of this pandemic, if required to assist the Regular Defence Forces during emergencies.

In April, the National Lottery extended by three months the time period during which it allowed people to collect their prizes from its Lotto, EuroMillions, Telly Bingo and Daily Million draws, effective from 9 January until 5 July. Scratchcard winners whose games were due to expire in April were given until 1 August to collect their prizes. This was due to the restrictions on travel which prevented people from remote parts of the country going to lottery headquarters in Abbey Street. Among those affected were the owner of a winning ticket—bought in Killarney in the southwest of the country—for a draw which had been rolling over since February until it was won towards the end of April.

In early April, the Dublin Institute for Advanced Studies—working with Geological Survey Ireland—announced that they had detected a measurable drop in seismic noise as a result of the coronavirus restrictions. Using the Irish National Seismic Network they found that the level of seismic noise was up to three times lower than before the restrictions were introduced.

World Health Organization Director-General Tedros Adhanom Ghebreyesus personally thanked Ireland on 16 April after the country quadrupled its annual contribution, to €9.5 million, following Donald Trump's decision to suspend U.S. funding.

In mid-April, Traveller groups asked that their members adhere to funeral restrictions after video footage circulated of a large funeral in the midlands town of Birr, County Offaly, at which social distancing efforts were ignored. Armed gardaí—upon learning that 70 people were travelling from abroad—monitored another funeral, that of a COVID-19 infected Traveller, in north Dublin on the morning of 18 April, for breaches of social distancing, and the force regarded as likely the occurrence of violent conduct during and after the event. In late-April, Traveller groups again reminded their members, this time "urgently", not to persist with their attendance of funerals in such enormous numbers. When gardaí learned that a Traveller wedding was taking place in County Wexford, they closed it down one hour before its scheduled beginning due to the lack of social distancing being favoured by the Travellers. Roma, of whom only 5% are Irish citizens and many of whom are known to favour living together in large numbers, also did not always adhere to social distancing.

A noticeable increase in illegal dumping occurred following the virus's arrival on Irish shores. The problem was so prominent in Cork that the City Council appealed for restraint. Other cities badly affected included Dublin, Galway, Kilkenny and Waterford. Meath County Council waived charges at its recycling centres in Navan, Kells and Trim in a bid to solve the problem locally. Louth County Council's mid-April estimate was a 25% increase in illegal dumping over previous weeks. Batteries, televisions and fridge freezers were among items dumped at a local beauty spot on the Inishowen peninsula, a few kilometres from a recycling centre in Carndonagh.

On 17 April, Minister for Social Protection Regina Doherty announced that the General Register Office has put arrangements in place for parents to send in their birth registration forms by email or post. Up to then, parents could only register the births of their children by visiting a General Register Office in person, a practice in place since 1864 when the first birth was registered. The first baby to have his birth registered electronically was Aaron Rafferty from Malahide, County Dublin.

21 April brought the cancellation of the annual Tidy Towns competition for the first time in its history.

Following public and political pressure, Allianz, Axa, FBD, RSA and Zurich in late-April offered "relief" to drivers left stranded with vehicle insurance they could not make the most of due to restrictions on their movement.

In archaeology, a drone operator found a previously unknown cliff fort near Lahinch in County Clare during the restrictions; it was later officially added to the List of National Monuments in County Clare.

On 14 May, the Office of Public Works (OPW) announced it would be implementing temporary measures to ensure social distancing at Phoenix Park from the following Monday, as a result of "significant new road safety issues not experienced before" due to increased numbers of pedestrians and cyclists. Also on 14 May, Dún Laoghaire–Rathdown County Council issued a statement saying that a temporary one-way traffic system would be established in the County Dublin village of Blackrock later that month due to the effects of the virus.

On 18 May, the Health Protection Surveillance Centre of the HSE urged people to be aware of Legionnaires' disease which could be caused by bacterial growth on appliances left unused due to the pandemic.

On the evening of 19 May, Prince Charles released a statement noting that it was with "particular sadness that, due to the current public health crisis", that himself and the Duchess Camilla could not partake of their annual visit to Ireland in 2020. The statement was timed to coincide with the eve of the fifth anniversary of his visit to Mullaghmore, County Sligo, site of the death of Charles's great uncle Lord Mountbatten in 1979.

On 23 May, Galway City Council shut down the St Nicholas's market due to inadequate social distancing shortly after it reopened.

On 9 July, Acting Chief Commissioner of the Irish Human Rights and Equality Commission Frank Conaty said that the harshest effect of the COVID-19 pandemic has been on elder people who are resident in congregated care settings, such as nursing homes and long-term care facilities.

On 15 September, the Central Statistics Office (CSO) announced that the next census, scheduled for April 2021, had been postponed until April 2022 due to restrictions having "prevented or delayed many key planning activities from taking place over recent months", as well as concerns over the safety of its staff and the public.

On 4 October, the Irish Examiner reported that the Data Protection Commission had ruled that Wexford County Council broke the law by using UAV drones intended for illegal dumping to instead monitor caravan parks and holiday homes during the two-kilometre restrictions in April.

On 30 October, the Office of Public Works announced that the perimeter gates of Phoenix Park would be closed on weekends for the remainder of Level 5 COVID-19 restrictions.

In December 2020, nine months after the pandemic was declared by WHO, the country's birth ratio experienced a shift, with the number of boys born falling from around 105 per 100 girls to just 97.8 boys per 100 girls born alive.

On 4 June 2021, Minister of State with responsibility for the Office of Public Works Patrick O'Donovan appealed to people visiting St Stephen's Green in Dublin to respect the site after reckless behaviour was witnessed on 3 June when a group of people gained access to the bandstand which had been fenced off for health and safety reasons.

On 7 May 2022, thousands of people took part in the Darkness into Light event, the first time since 2019 that in-person walks took place to mark the event due to COVID-19.
