= Midland Regional Hospital =

Midland Regional Hospital may refer to various hospitals in Ireland:

- Midland Regional Hospital, Mullingar
- Midland Regional Hospital, Portlaoise
- Midland Regional Hospital, Tullamore
