= Bantry General Hospital =

- Health Service Executive
- Shown in Ireland

Geography
- Location: Bantry, County Cork, Ireland
- Coordinates: 51°40′35″N 9°26′59″W

Organisation
- Care system: HSE
- Type: General

Services
- Emergency department: Local Injury Unit and Medical Assessment Unit
- Beds: 104

History
- Founded: 1959

Links
- Website: www.hse.ie/eng/services/list/3/acutehospitals/hospitals/bantry/
- Lists: Hospitals in the Republic of Ireland

Bantry General Hospital (Irish: Ospidéal Ginearálta Bheanntraí) is a public hospital located in Bantry, County Cork, Ireland. It is managed by South/Southwest Hospital Group.

== History ==
The hospital has its origins in the Bantry Union Workhouse and Infirmary which was designed by George Wilkinson and opened in 1845. Bantry General Hospital was built on the site in 1959.

== Services ==
The hospital provides 104 beds, of which 80 are in-patient acute beds, while 6 are reserved for acute day cases. A further 18 beds are for psychiatric services.
