= South Infirmary-Victoria University Hospital =

- Health Service Executive
- Shown in Ireland

Geography
- Location: Cork, County Cork, Ireland
- Coordinates: 51.8931°N 8.4653°W

Organisation
- Care system: HSE
- Type: General

History
- Founded: 1762

Links
- Website: www.hse.ie/eng/services/list/3/acutehospitals/hospitals/sivh/

The South Infirmary-Victoria University Hospital (Irish: Ospidéal Ollscoile Victoria na hOtharlainne Theas) is an elective surgical hospital in Cork, County Cork, Ireland. It is part of the South/Southwest Hospital Group.

== History ==
The South Infirmary was established by a Catholic charity and officially opened in 1762. Meanwhile, the Victoria Hospital for Women and Children, which had been established by a Protestant charity and opened at Union Quay in September 1874, moved to Pope's Quay in October 1876 and then re-located to a site adjacent to the South Infirmary in September 1885. The two hospitals officially merged as the South Infirmary-Victoria Hospital in 1988. After a name change to South Infirmary-Victoria University Hospital in 2005, the hospital expanded with three new operating theatres being completed in 2012.
