= An Coimisiún Pleanála =

Statutory Irish body responsible for planning approvals

Coordinates: 53.352739°N 6.259466°W

- Formation: 2025 (An Coimisiún Pleanála); 1976 (An Bord Pleanála)
- Type: Independent statutory body
- Purpose: Planning
- Headquarters: Marlborough Street, Dublin
- Location: Dublin, Ireland
- Chairperson of the Board: Paul Reid (2025)
- Website: www.pleanala.ie
- Formerly called: An Bord Pleanála

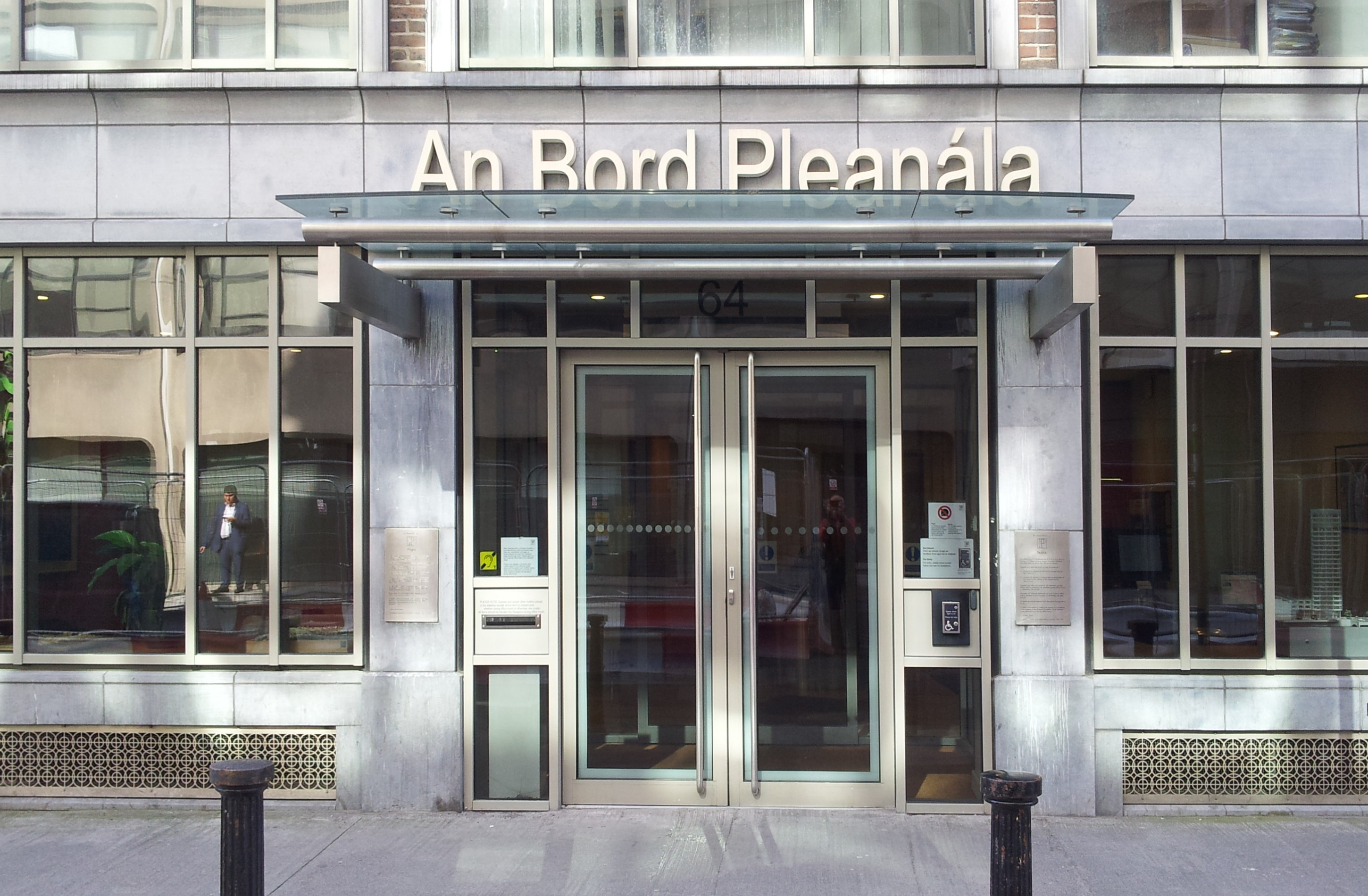
Headquarters in Marlborough Street, Dublin (prior to renaming)

An Coimisiún Pleanála (meaning "the planning commission"; formerly An Bord Pleanála) is an independent, statutory, quasi-judicial body that decides on appeals from planning decisions made by local authorities in Ireland. As of 2007, the organisation directly decided major strategic infrastructural projects under the provisions of the Planning and Development (Strategic Infrastructure) Act 2006. It also hears applications from local authorities for projects which would have a significant environmental impact. Following the phased commencement of the Planning and Development Act 2024, the organisation was restructured and renamed to An Coimisiún Pleanála in June 2025.

== History ==
An Bord Pleanála was established by the Local Government (Planning and Development) Act 1976, assuming responsibility for planning appeals in March 1977. Its provisions have for the most part been carried over into the Planning and Development Act 2000.

An Bord Pleanála was restructured and renamed to An Coimisiún Pleanála in June 2025, following the approval and phased commencement of the Planning and Development Act 2024. Former Health Service Executive director-general, Paul Reid, was named as its new chairperson.

== Controversy ==
In April 2022 online news platform The Ditch reported that the body's deputy chairperson Paul Hyde had failed to declare his property interests to the board. Hyde resigned from his position in July 2022 before an investigation into the allegations by Remy Farrell SC was concluded. In October 2022 it was reported that the DPP had decided to initiate a criminal prosecution against Hyde. The following month, the body's chairman Dave Walsh announced he was taking early retirement amid ongoing controversy at the board. Paul Hyde eventually pled guilty to two of the nine counts charged against him and was initially sentenced to two two-month prison terms, but on appeal, he was given two suspended sentences and fined €6,000.
