= List of venues for National Ploughing Championships =

2026 Screggan Tullamore Co. Offaly

This article is a list of venues for the National Ploughing Championships, an agricultural fair held annually in the Republic of Ireland since 1931.

Year	Photo	Location	Start date	End date	Attendance	Notes
1931		Coursetown, Athy, County Kildare	16 February			
1932		Gorey, County Wexford	19 February			
1933		Clondalkin, County Dublin	15 February			
1934		Athenry, County Galway	13 February			
1935		Mallow, County Cork	13 February			
1936		Tullamore, County Offaly	February			
1937		Greystones, County Wicklow	9 February			
1938		Oakpark, Carlow	10 February			
1939		Killarney, County Kerry	8 February			
1940		Thurles, County Tipperary/Kilkenny	21 January	1 February		
1941		Cork / Navan, County Meath	12 February	18 February		
1942		Cloghran, County Dublin	12 February			
1943		Lamberton, Portlaoise, County Laois	12 February			
1944		Ballinasloe, County Galway	9 February			
1945		County Tipperary	21 February			
1946		Balbriggan, County Dublin	7 February			
1947		Maynooth, County Kildare	11 February			
1948		County Limerick	19 February			
1949		Drogheda, County Louth	10 February			
1950		Bandon, County Cork	9 February			
1951		County Wexford	1 February			
1952		Athenry, County Galway	7 February			
1953		Mullingar, County Westmeath	11 February			
1954		Cahir, County Tipperary	11 February			
1955		Athy, County Kildare	10 February	11 February		
1956		Nenagh, County Tipperary	1 February	11 February		
1957		Boyle, County Roscommon	7 February	8 February		
1958		Tramore, County Waterford	12 February	13 February		
1959		Burnchurch, County Kilkenny	28 January	29 January		
1960		New Ross, County Wexford	9 November	10 November		
1961		Killarney, County Kerry	8 November	9 November		
1962		Dovea, Thurles, County Tipperary	7 November	8 November		
1963		Athenry, County Galway	6 November	7 November		
1964		Danesfort, County Kilkenny	18 November	19 November		
1965		Enniskerry, County Wicklow	17 November	18 November		
1966		Rosegarland Est., Wellingtonbridge, County Wexford	2 November	3 November		
1967		Tullow, County Carlow	25 October	26 October		
1968		Banteer, Mallow, County Cork	23 October	24 October		
1969		Rockwell College, Cashel, County Tipperary	22 October	23 October		
1970		Danesfort, County Kilkenny	28 October	29 October		
1971		Finglas, County Dublin	27 October	28 October		
1972		Rockwell College, Cashel, County Tipperary	25 October	26 October		
1973		Rosegarland Estate, Wellingtonbridge, County Wexford	3 October	6 October		
1974		Watergrasshill, County Cork	16 October	17 October		
1975		Bennettsbridge, County Kilkenny	15 October	16 October		
1976		Wells, Gorey, County Wexford	13 October	14 October		
1977		Rockwell College, Cashel, County Tipperary	19 October	20 October		
1978		Knocktopher, County Kilkenny	11 October	12 October		
1979		Watergrasshill, County Cork	10 October	11 October		
1980		Rockwell College, Cashel, County Tipperary	7 October	8 October		
1981		Wellingtonbridge, Wexford	7 October	10 October		
1982		Edenderry, County Offaly	12 October	13 October		
1983		IDA Grounds, County Waterford	5 October	6 October		
1984		Ardfert, County Kerry	3 October	4 October		
1985		Kilkea, Athy, County Kildare	2 October	3 October		
1986		Woodsgift Hse., Woodsgift, County Kilkenny	8 October	9 October		
1987		Charleville Estate, Tullamore, County Offaly	7 October	8 October		
1988		Oak Park Research Centre, County Carlow	4 October	6 October		
1989		Oak Park Research Centre, County Carlow	October			
1990		Oak Park Research Centre, County Carlow	October			
1991		Crecora, County Limerick				
1992		Carrigtwohill, County Cork				
1993		Shanballyard, Clerihan, Clonmel, County Tipperary	28 September	30 September		Famously remembered as "The Wet Year" due to heavy rain turned the fields and car parks into mud
1994		Drumgold, Enniscorthy, County Wexford				
1995		Ballacolla, County Laois				
1996		Oak Park Research Centre, County Carlow				
1997		Parkmore, Fiveally, Birr, County Offaly				
1998		Ballycarney, Ferns, County Wexford				
1999		Castletownroche, County Cork	28 September	30 September		
2000		Ballacolla, County Laois	26 September	28 September		
2001		Ballacolla, County Laois	2 October	4 October		Event cancelled due to Foot and Mouth outbreak
2002		Ballacolla, County Laois	24 September	26 September		
2003		Ballinabrackey, County Meath (5 km south of Kinnegad)	23 September	25 September		
2004		Athy, County Kildare				
2005		Mogeely, County Cork	27 September 2005	29 September 2005		
2006		Grangeford, Tullow, County Carlow	27 September	28 September		Also hosted World Ploughing Championships 29–30 September
2007		Annaharvey Farm; Tullamore, County Offaly	25 September	27 September		
2008		Burnchurch, County Kilkenny (8 km southwest of Kilkenny City)	23 September	25 September		
2009		Cardenton, Athy, County Kildare	22 September	29 September		
2010		Cardenton, Athy, County Kildare	21 September	23 September		
2011		Cardenton, Athy, County Kildare	20 September	22 September		
2012		Heathpark, New Ross, County Wexford	25 September	27 September		
2013		Ratheniska, County Laois	24 September	26 September	228,000	70th Anniversary since the ploughing was first held in Laois.
2014		Ratheniska, County Laois	23 September	25 September	280,000	
2015		Ratheniska, County Laois	22 September	24 September	281,000	All-time record for one day was set on the 23rd of 127,000
2016		Screggan, Tullamore, County Offaly	20 September	22 September	283,000	
2017		Screggan, Tullamore, County Offaly	19 September	21 September	291,500	
2018		Screggan, Tullamore, County Offaly	18 September	21 September	Day 1: 97,500 Day 2:cancelled Day 3: 81,500 Day 4: 61,700 Total: 240,700	Show cancelled on 19 September due to Storm Ali; an additional day was added on 21 September to compensate.
2019		Ballintrane, Fenagh, County Carlow	17 September	19 September	Day 1: 102,500 Day 2: 113,500 Day 3: 81,000 Total: 297,000	Total attendance figures for the 88th Championships came to a record breaking 297,000 visitors over the 3 days
~~2020~~ Cancelled due to the COVID-19 pandemic		The event was cancelled due to the impact of the COVID-19 pandemic in the Republic of Ireland. A limited number of ploughing competitions were planned for October, but without spectators.				
2021		Ratheniska, County Laois	15 September	17 September	Day 1: <1,000 Day 2: <1,000 Day 3: <1,000 Total: <3,000	A limit of 1,000 attendees per day was in place due to continued COVID-19 related restrictions.
2022		Ratheniska, County Laois	20 September	22 September	Day 1: 91,500 Day 2: 115,500 Day 3: 70,000 Total: 277,000	Day 2 of the 91st Ploughing Championships saw a record daily number of attendees, this was 115,000 people. This was also the World Ploughing Championships.
2023		Ratheniska, County Laois	19 September	21 September	Day 1: 66,250 Day 2: 71,800 Day 3: 62,500 Total: 200,550	Macra na Feirme organised a successful world record attempt to throw the most wellies simultaneously.
2024		Ratheniska, County Laois	17 September	19 September	Day 1: 75,500 Day 2: 90,500 Day 3: 78,000 Total: 244,000	
2025		Screggan, Tullamore, County Offaly	16 September	18 September	Day 1: 78,500 Day 2: 85,000 Day 3: 62,000 Total: 225,500	
2026		Screggan, Tullamore, County Offaly	15 September	17 September	Day 1: 77,000 Day 2: 91,000 Day 3: 75,000 Total: 243,000	
2027		Rathangan, County Kildare	21 September	23 September		
