= The Coombe Hospital =

- Health Service Executive
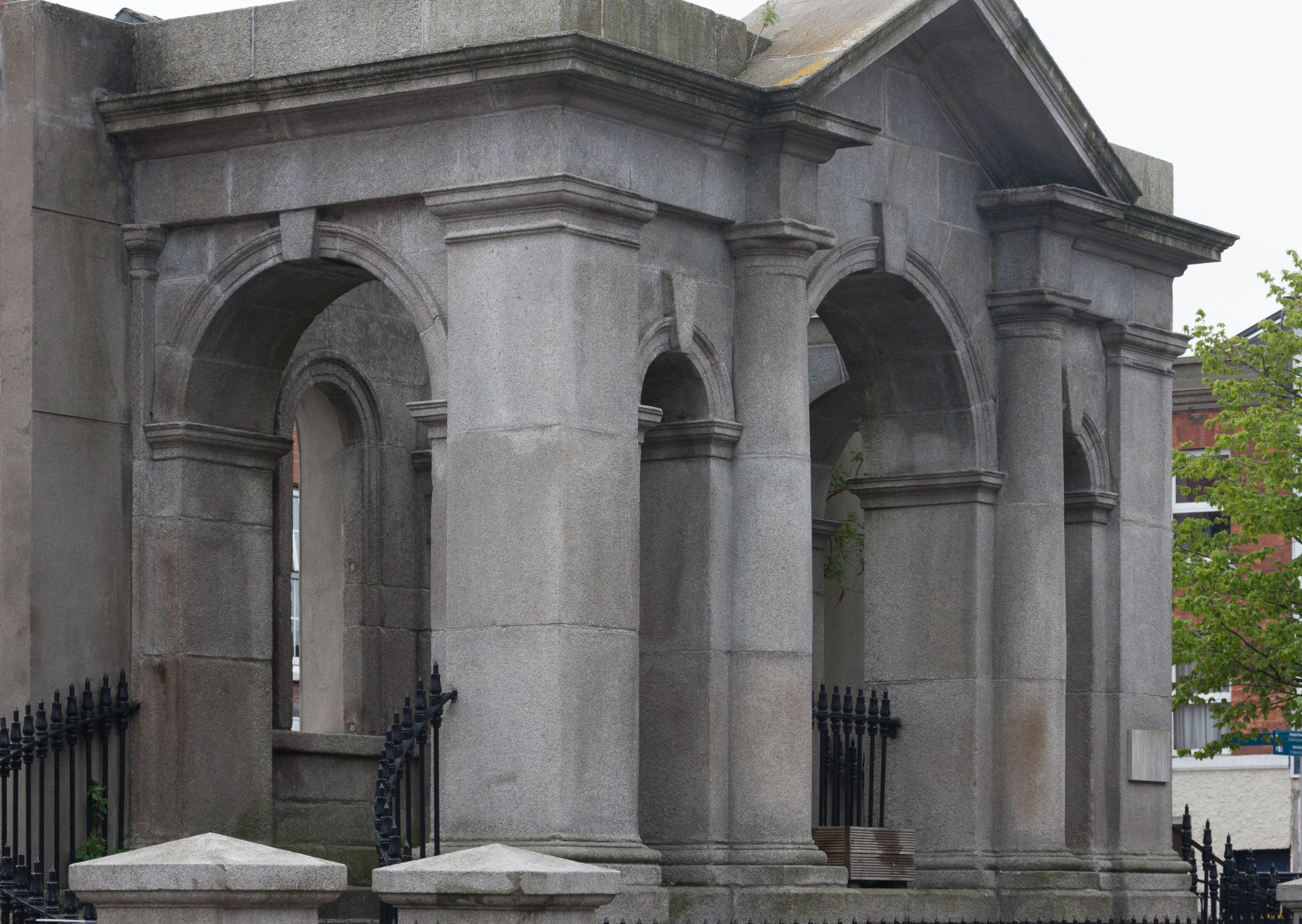
- The Coombe Hospital Monument in Dublin's Liberties area (the original portico of the hospital commemorating the site where the hospital was located from 1829 to 1967)

Geography
- Location: Dublin, Ireland
- Coordinates: 53.3349°N 6.2891°W

Organisation
- Care system: HSE
- Type: Specialist

Services
- Speciality: Obstetrics and gynaecology

History
- Founded: 1826; 200 years ago

Links
- Website: http://www.coombe.ie

The Coombe Hospital (/ˈkuːm/; Irish: Ospidéal an Chúim) is a voluntary teaching hospital providing a range of medical services to both women and newborn infants in Dublin, Ireland. It is managed by Dublin Midlands Hospital Group.

== History ==
=== Former Meath Hospital building ===
The hospital was founded by Margaret Boyle in the vacated building of the Meath Hospital in the Coombe in Dublin's Liberties area in 1826. It formally opened as the Coombe Lying-in Hospital (which remains its legal name) in 1829 and was granted a Royal Charter in 1867.

An almost entirely new hospital was built to the design of James Franklin Fuller between 1872 and 1877 on the same site.

=== 19th century hospital ===
The hospital moved to modern premises nearby in Dolphin's Barn in 1967. Although the old hospital was demolished, the Victorian portico was retained as a monument to the many mothers who gave birth in the old hospital.

=== 20th century hospital ===
The new facility adopted the working name of the Coombe Women's Hospital in 1993 and it was renamed the Coombe Women & Infants University Hospital in January 2008 despite not being located in the Coombe.

The hospital was targeted in a ransomware attack on 15 December 2021 forcing its IT services to be shut down.

== Services ==
The Coombe Hospital is one of the largest providers of women and infant health care in the Republic of Ireland. Over 8,000 mothers give birth in the hospital every year. It provides clinical experience to three training colleges, including University College Dublin, Royal College of Surgeons in Ireland and Trinity College, Dublin.
