= Tipperary University Hospital =

- Health Service Executive
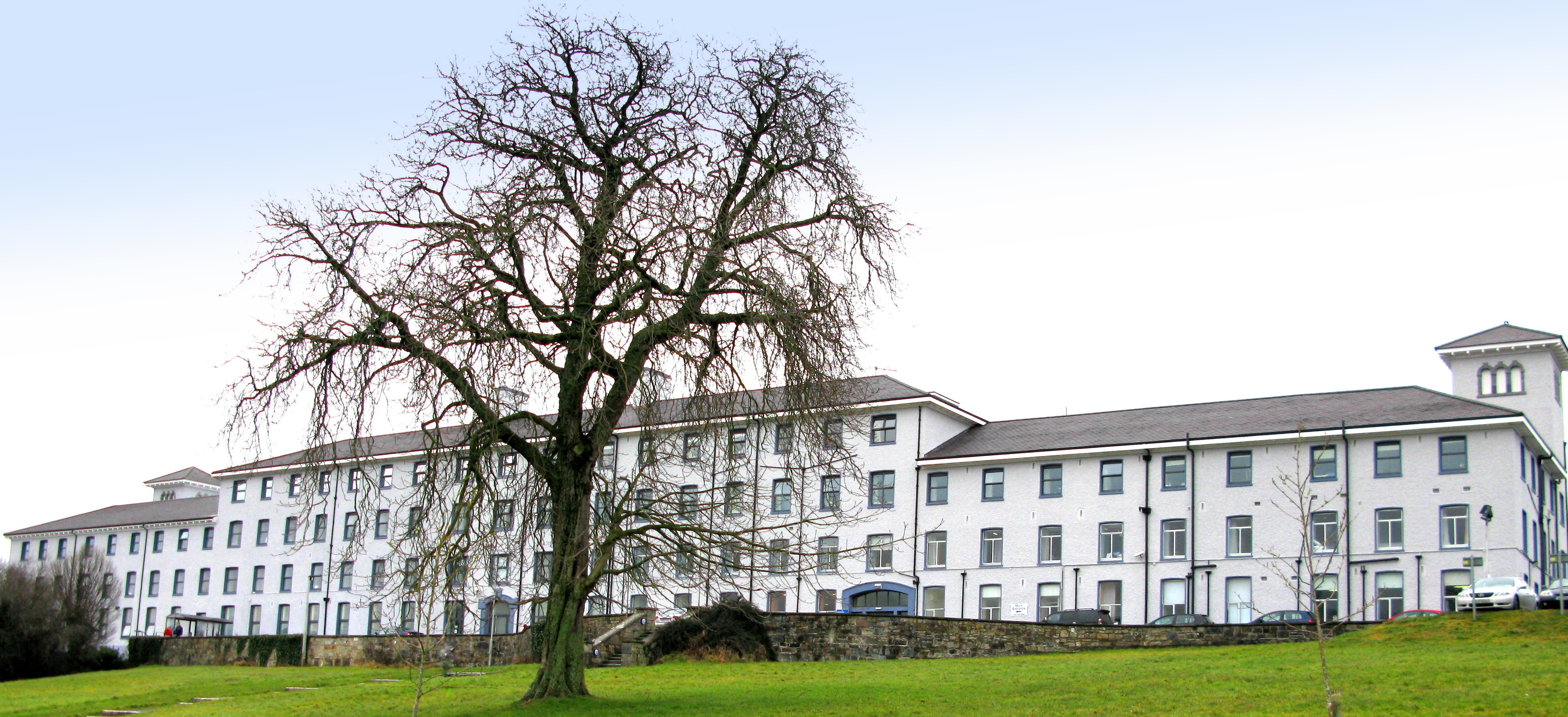

- Shown in Ireland

Geography
- Location: Clonmel, County Tipperary, Ireland
- Coordinates: 52.3553°N 7.7187°W

Organisation
- Care system: HSE
- Type: Regional

Services
- Emergency department: Yes
- Beds: 255

History
- Founded: 1853

Links
- Website: www2.hse.ie/services/hospitals/tipperary-university-hospital/

Tipperary University Hospital (Irish: Ospidéal Ollscoile Thiobraid Árann) is a public hospital located in Clonmel, County Tipperary, Ireland. It is managed by South/Southwest Hospital Group.

== History ==
The hospital has it origins in the Clonmel Union Workhouse and Infirmary which was designed by George Wilkinson and opened in October 1853. The Sisters of Mercy managed the clinical operations of the infirmary from 1883. The infirmary evolved to become St. Joseph's Hospital, Clonmel and, after a major expansion, it re-opened as the Clonmel County Medical and Maternity Hospital in 1950.

== Services ==
The hospital provides 318 beds, of which 217 are in-patient beds, 25 are designated for day cases, 25 for emergency department patients, and 2 for labour ward admissions, while a further 49 are reserved for psychiatric patients.
