= Kilcreene Orthopaedic Hospital =

Hospital near Kilkenny city, Ireland

- Health Service Executive
- Shown in Ireland

Geography
- Location: Kilcreene, County Kilkenny, Ireland
- Coordinates: 52.6525°N 7.2761°W

Organisation
- Care system: HSE
- Type: Orthopaedic

Services
- Beds: 50

History
- Founded: 1959

Links
- Website: www.hse.ie/eng/services/list/3/acutehospitals/hospitals/kilcreene/

Kilcreene Orthopaedic Hospital (Irish: Ospidéal Ortaipéideach Kilcreene) is a public hospital near Kilkenny city, Ireland. It is in Kilcreene, 1.5 km west of the city centre (3 km by road). The hospital is managed by South/Southwest Hospital Group.

== History ==
The site occupied by the hospital was originally part of the Kilcreene House Estate, the home of the Evans baronets. After the house had been demolished, a modern medical facility was built and opened as Lourdes Orthopaedic Hospital in 1959. In March 2019 the Health Service Executive announced that it would transfer orthopaedic services from the hospital, by then known as Kilcreene Orthopaedic Hospital, to the University Hospital Waterford.

== Services ==
The hospital provides 50 in-patient beds.

== See also ==
- St. Dympna's Hospital
- St. Luke's General Hospital
