= Anne O'Connor =

Chief Executive of Ireland's Health Service Executive

Chief Executive of the Health Service Executive
- Incumbent
- Assumed office 23 March 2026
- Preceded by: Bernard Gloster

Personal details
- Born: Newcastle, Galway, Ireland
- Education: University of Liverpool; Trinity College Dublin; University College Cork
- Salary: €398,174 (2026)

Anne O'Connor is an Irish healthcare executive who has been chief executive of the Health Service Executive (HSE), Ireland's public health service, since March 2026. She previously was the HSE's chief operations officer and national director for mental health services, and most recently was managing director of Vhi Health and Wellbeing

== Early life and education ==
O'Connor trained as an occupational therapist and began her professional career in the United Kingdom. She holds a Diploma in Occupational Therapy from the University of Liverpool, an MSc in Occupational Therapy from Trinity College Dublin, and an MSc in Management Practice from University College Cork, completed in association with the Irish Management Institute.

== Career ==
O'Connor held a number of senior management roles within the Health Service Executive (HSE). She was national director for mental health and later as the first national director for community operations, with responsibility for primary care and community-based health services.

In 2018, she was appointed chief operations officer (COO) of the HSE, reporting to the director general of the HSE. In this role, she was responsible for operational delivery across acute hospital services, community services and social care.

During her tenure as COO, O'Connor played a central role in the HSE's operational response to the COVID-19 pandemic in the Republic of Ireland and in managing the response to the 2021 cyberattack on the health service's information systems. On 4 April 2022, it was announced that O'Connor would be leaving the organisation in the summer to take up a new role as managing director of Vhi Health and Wellbeing.

In December 2025, O'Connor was appointed as chief executive of the HSE to succeed Bernard Gloster. She commenced the role in March 2026.
