= South/Southwest Hospital Group =

Hospital group in ireland

The South/Southwest Hospital Group (Irish: Grúpa Ospidéal an Deiscirt / an Iardheiscirt) is one of the hospital groups established by the Health Service Executive in Ireland.

== History ==
The grouping of hospitals was announced by the Irish Minister for Health, Dr. James Reilly TD in May 2013, as part of a restructure of Irish public hospitals and a goal of delivering better patient care. The Group was given responsibility for the following hospitals:

- Bantry General Hospital
- Cork University Hospital
- Kilcreene Orthopaedic Hospital
- Mallow General Hospital
- Mercy University Hospital
- South Infirmary-Victoria University Hospital
- Tipperary University Hospital
- University Hospital Kerry
- University Hospital Waterford

In September 2017 it was reported that the Health Service Executive was considering plans to move South Tipperary General Hospital to another hospital group.

== Services ==
The Group is headed by a Chief Executive, who is accountable to the National Director for Acute Services in the Health Service Executive, and is responsibility for delivering inpatient care, emergency care, maternity services, outpatient care and diagnostic services at its designated hospitals. The Group’s designated cancer centres are Cork University Hospital and University Hospital Waterford. The Group's academic partner is University College Cork.
