= Cancer screening in Ireland =

BowelScreen, BreastCheck and CervicalCheck are cancer screening programmes organised by the Health Service Executive (HSE) in Ireland.

== BowelScreen ==
BowelScreen is the national bowel cancer screening programme. It was launched in November 2012 by Minister for Health James Reilly, with the eventual aim of offering bi-annual scans to people ages 55 to 74. It is offered every two years to residents of Ireland age 59 to 69. The screening consists of an at-home stool test and, if a certain level of blood is found, a referral for a colonoscopy.

== BreastCheck ==
BreastCheck is the national breast cancer screening programme. It was initially founded under Micheál Martin's tenure as Minister for Health and Children in October 2000 as a pilot in a limited number of health boards. Over 70% of the women invited to take part in the screening in the first year, accepted.

During the height of the COVID-19 pandemic in 2020, breast cancer and cervical cancer screenings were temporarily suspended and the number of breast cancer-related procedures and diagnoses were greatly reduced. This has led to concerns over the lasting effects of the pandemic, including healthcare capacity issues and delayed diagnoses.

As of 2024, free breast cancer screening is offered every two years to all women aged 50 to 67. Due to the pandemic, invitations for breast screening may be sent every three years instead of every two years.

== CervicalCheck ==
CervicalCheck is the national cervical screening programme. It was launched in September 2008 as the public name of the National Cancer Screening Service. In May 2008, then chief executive officer Tony O'Brien dismissed claims that misdiagnoses would result from the use of US-based lab Quest Diagnostics.

=== 2018 ===
In 2014, a woman presented with a confirmed diagnosis of cervical cancer after a CervicalCheck test showed no abnormalities. On 26 April 2018, the HSE confirmed that 206 women developed cervical cancer after having a screening test which was subsequently deemed to be potentially inaccurate, given the known limitations of screening using smear technology. In May, HSE director-general Tony O'Brien took temporary leave of absence from the board of a US medical company amid renewed calls for him to stand aside from his position due to the ongoing controversy. Tony O'Brien announced his resignation as director-general of the HSE with effect from close of business on 11 May.
