= Laois County Infirmary =

- Shown in Ireland

Geography
- Location: Portlaoise, County Laois, Ireland
- Coordinates: 53°02′10″N 7°17′25″W

Organisation
- Type: General

History
- Founded: 1808
- Closed: 1936

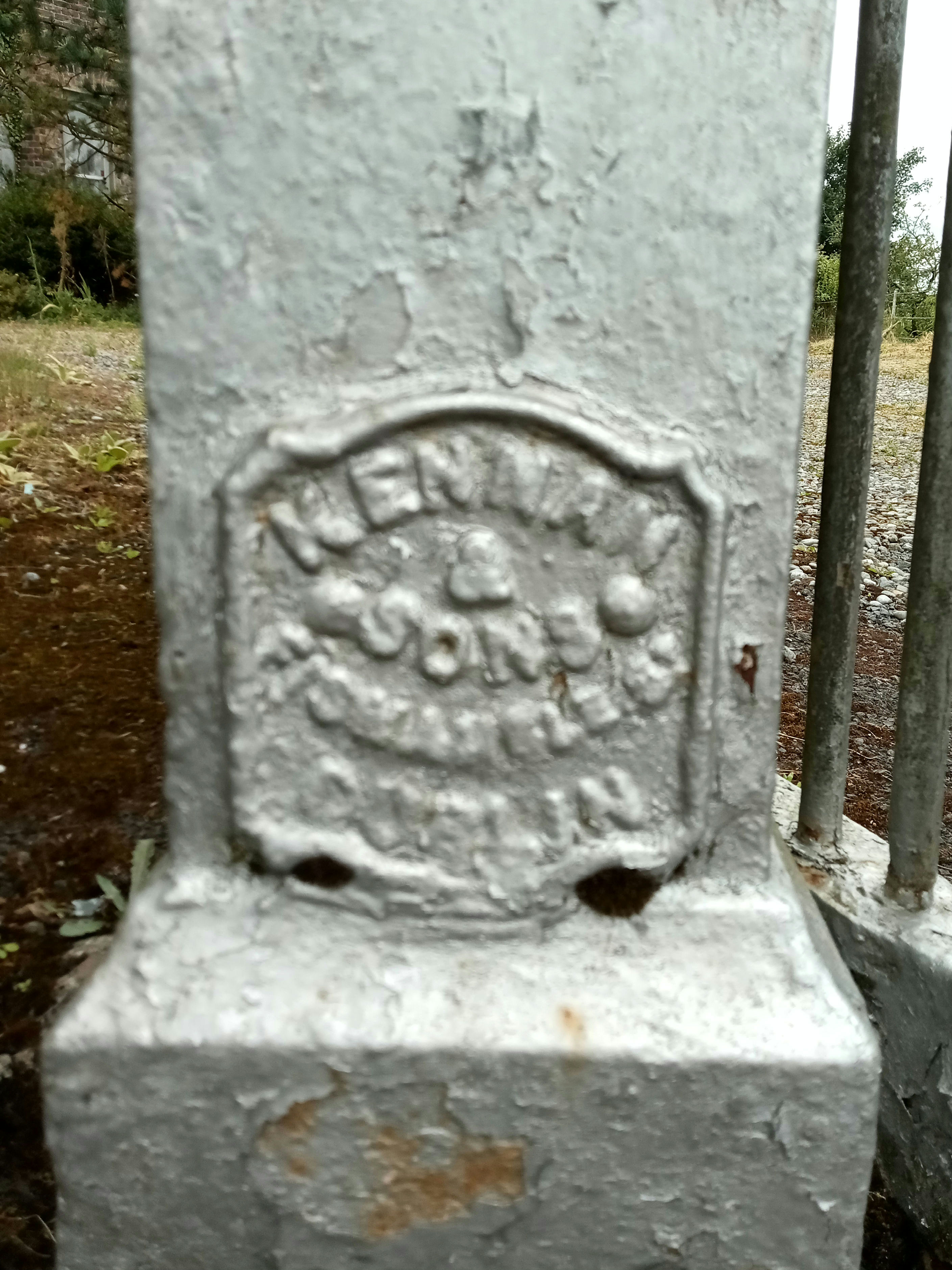
Maker's mark at Laois County Infirmary

Laois County Infirmary (Irish: Otharlann Chontae Laoise) was a hospital in Portlaoise, County Laois, Ireland.

== History ==
The infirmary was built by David Henry in 1808. It was replaced by the Midland Regional Hospital, Portlaoise in 1936. The building, which survives, was refurbished and converted to offices in the early 2000s and is now an integral part of Grattan Business Centre.

== See also ==
- Midland Regional Hospital, Portlaoise
