= Midland Regional Hospital, Tullamore =

- Health Service Executive
- Shown in Ireland

Geography
- Location: Tullamore, County Offaly, Ireland
- Coordinates: 53.2831°N 7.49065°W

Organisation
- Care system: HSE
- Type: Regional

Services
- Emergency department: Yes
- Beds: 254

History
- Founded: 1942

Links
- Website: www2.hse.ie/services/hospitals/midland-regional-hospital-tullamore/

The Midland Regional Hospital, Tullamore (Irish: Ospidéal Réigiúnach Lár Tíre, An Tulach Mhór) is a public hospital located in Tullamore, County Offaly, Ireland. It is managed by Dublin Midlands Hospital Group.

== History ==
The foundation stone for the hospital, which was designed by Scott & Gould, was laid by Seán T. O'Kelly, Minister of Local Government and Public Health, on 31 March 1937. It was officially opened as Tullamore General Hospital in December 1942.

== Services ==
The hospital provides 254 beds, of which 207 are in-patient acute beds, while 47 are reserved for acute day cases.

== See also ==
- Midland Regional Hospital, Mullingar
- Midland Regional Hospital, Portlaoise
