= Naas General Hospital =

Coordinates: 53.2115°N 6.6616°W

- Health Service Executive
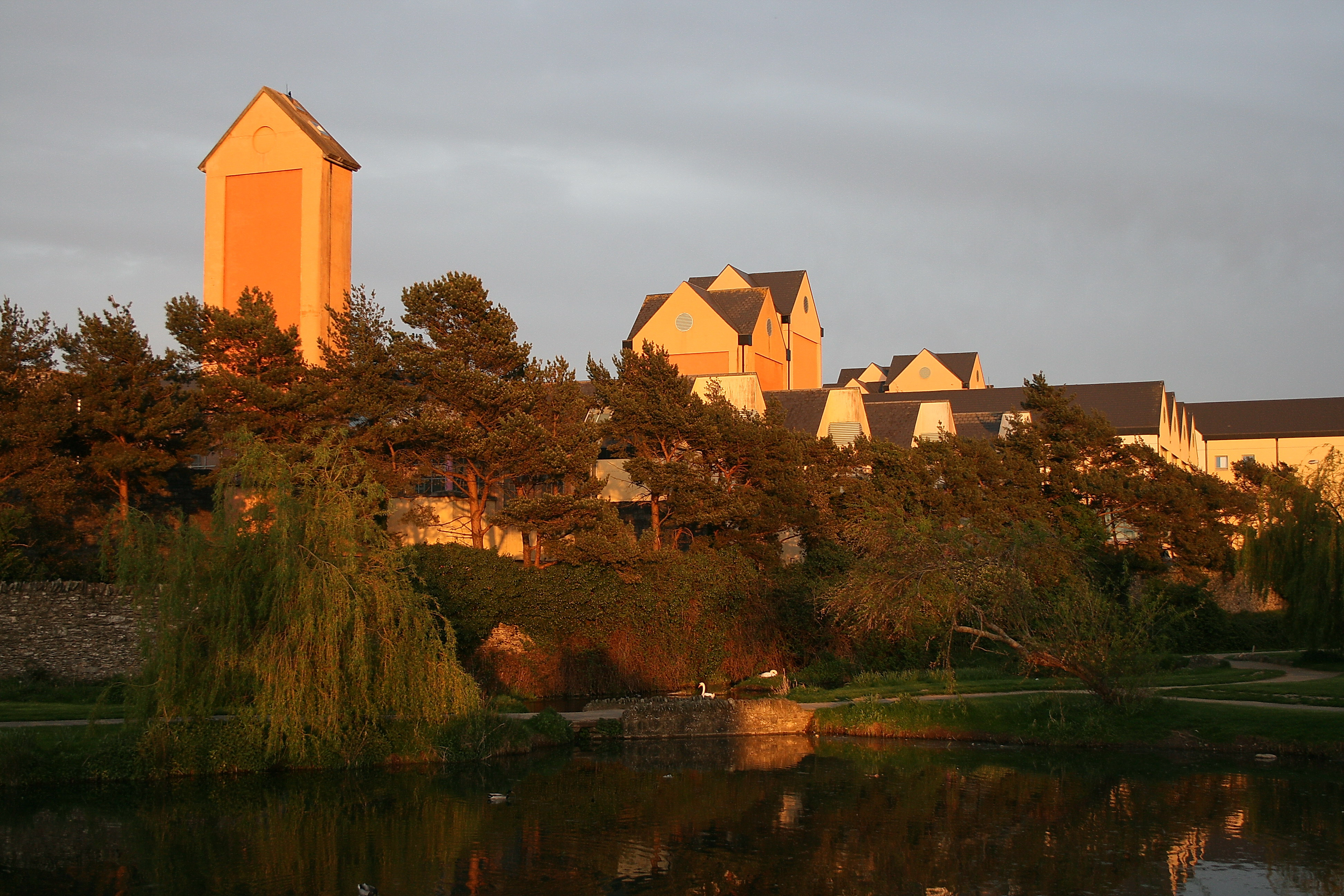
- Naas General Hospital

- Shown in Ireland

Geography
- Location: Naas, County Kildare, Ireland

Organisation
- Care system: HSE
- Type: General

History
- Founded: 1841

Links
- Website: www.naashospital.ie

Naas General Hospital (Irish: Ospidéal Ginearálta an Náis) is a general hospital located on the Craddockstown Road at Naas in County Kildare in Ireland. It was founded in 1841 and is managed by Dublin Midlands Hospital Group.

== History ==
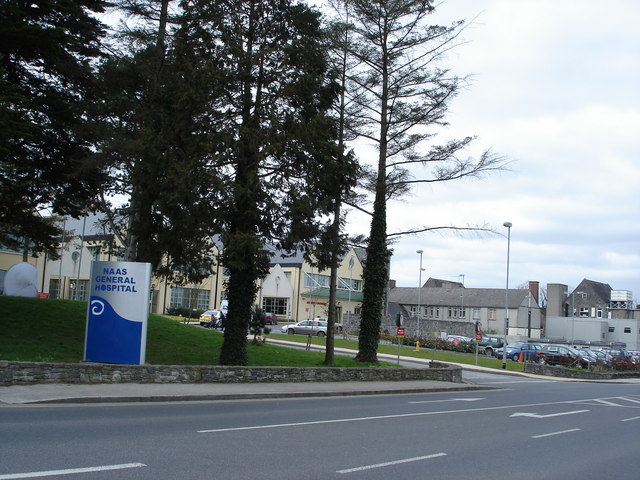
The entrance to the modern General Hospital

The hospital has its origins in the Naas Union Workhouse and Infirmary which was designed by George Wilkinson and opened in 1841. In 1922, shortly after the creation of the Irish Free State, it became Naas County Hospital. During the 1990s, the Department of Health undertook a programme of developing the site as a modern general hospital.

== Services ==
The hospital provides acute services for the population of around 200,000 people in County Kildare and western parts of County Wicklow. The hospital currently has 243 patient beds which include 18 day service beds. The hospital features a 24-hour Emergency Department.
