= Midland Regional Hospital, Portlaoise =

Midlands Regional Hospital, Portlaoise
- Health Service Executive
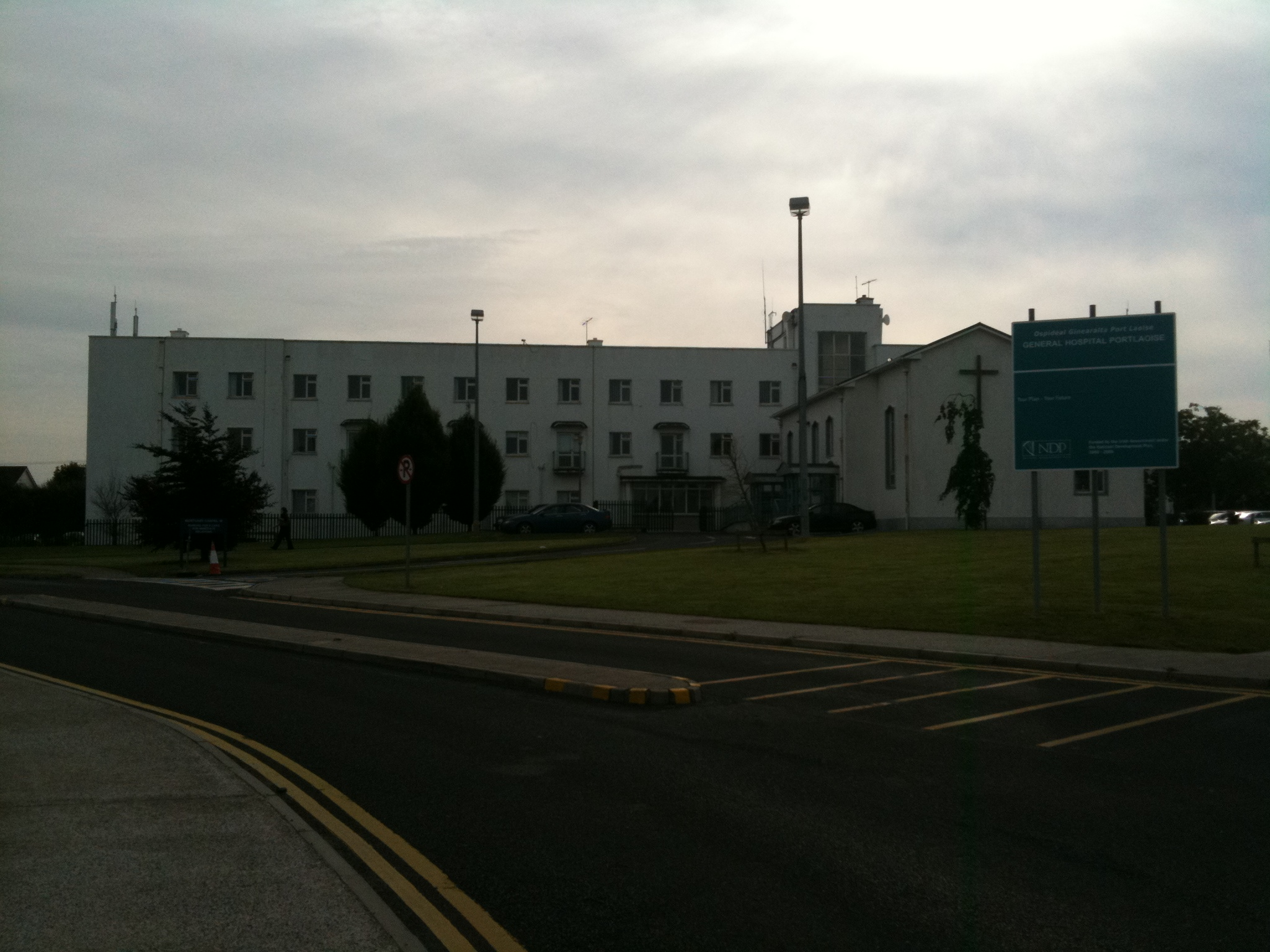
- Midland Regional Hospital

- Shown in Ireland

Geography
- Location: Portlaoise, County Laois, Ireland
- Coordinates: 53.0377°N 7.2758°W

Organisation
- Care system: HSE
- Type: Regional

Services
- Emergency department: Yes
- Beds: 200

History
- Founded: 1936

Links
- Website: www2.hse.ie/services/hospitals/midland-regional-hospital-portlaoise/

The Midlands Regional Hospital, Portlaoise (Irish: Ospidéal Réigiúnach Lár Tíre, Port Laoise) is a public hospital located in Portlaoise, County Laois, Ireland. It is managed by Dublin Midlands Hospital Group.

== History ==
The hospital, which replaced Laois County Infirmary, was designed by Drogheda born Irish architect Michael Scott, and was built between 1933 and 1936.

On 5 March 2008, reports were published regarding the breast cancer misdiagnosis scandal at the hospital. A very high misdiagnosis rate was found to have occurred between 2003 and 2007.

On 30 January 2014, the RTÉ Investigations Unit broadcast a Prime Time programme about the tragic deaths of newborn babies in Portlaoise Hospital and the subsequent management of patients and their families by the hospital and the HSE. A statutory investigation was launched and it found that 8 babies had died due a lack of know-how and a lack of resources at the hospital.

In October 2017, it was reported that the Dublin Midlands Hospital Group was considering removing the accident & emergency service from the hospital.

== Services ==
The hospital provides 200 beds, of which 140 are in-patient acute beds, while 10 are reserved for acute day cases.

== See also ==
- Laois County Infirmary
- St. Fintan's Hospital
- Midland Regional Hospital, Mullingar
- Midland Regional Hospital, Tullamore
