= Dublin Midlands Hospital Group =

Hospital group in ireland

The Dublin Midlands Hospital Group (Irish: Grúpa Ospidéal Lár Tíre Bhaile Átha Cliath) is one of the hospital groups established by the Health Service Executive in Ireland.

== History ==
The grouping of hospitals was announced by the Irish Minister for Health, Dr. James Reilly TD in May 2013, as part of a restructure of Irish public hospitals and a goal of delivering better patient care. The Group was given responsibility for the following hospitals:

Southern Dublin

- St. James's Hospital, inner city Dublin
- Coombe Women & Infants University Hospital, inner city Dublin
- Tallaght University Hospital

Midlands counties

- Naas General Hospital
- Midland Regional Hospital, Portlaoise
- Midland Regional Hospital, Tullamore

In April 2018, Dublin Midlands Hospital Group had to defend the level of its car parking charges.

== Services ==
The Group is headed by a Chief Executive, who is accountable to the National Director for Acute Services in the Health Service Executive, and is responsible for delivering inpatient care, emergency care, maternity services, outpatient care and diagnostic services at its designated hospitals. The Group’s designated cancer centre is St. James’s Hospital. The Group's academic partner is Trinity College Dublin.
