= Bernard Gloster =

Former Chief Executive of Ireland's Health Service Executive

Chief Executive of the Health Service Executive
- In office 6 March 2023 – 23 March 2026
- Preceded by: Paul Reid
- Succeeded by: Anne O'Connor

Chief Executive of Tusla
- In office September 2019 – 6 March 2023
- Preceded by: Fred McBride
- Succeeded by: Kate Duggan

Personal details
- Born: 1965 or 1966 (age 59–60) Kildimo, County Limerick, Ireland
- Education: Oxford Brookes University; University College Cork
- Salary: €382,675 (2024)

Bernard Gloster (born 1965/1966) is an Irish public servant who was chief executive of the Health Service Executive from March 2023 to March 2026. He previously was chief executive of Tusla from 2019 to 2023, and before that chief officer of the HSE Mid-West.

== Career ==
In 1989, Gloster took a temporary job for two months as a caretaker in the Southill Health Centre in Limerick. Originally trained as a social care worker, he was a senior health manager in acute and community care for 16 years. Gloster holds an MBA from Oxford Brookes University and an MSc in Management Practice from University College Cork. He spent more than 30 years working in the health service and has held several senior management positions, including nine years as chief officer of HSE Mid-West Community Healthcare.

On 28 June 2019, Gloster was appointed chief executive of child and family agency Tusla and took up the position in September that year.

On 16 December 2022, Gloster was appointed chief executive of the Health Service Executive following the departure of Paul Reid. He took up the position in March 2023.

In May 2025, Gloster announced his intention to step down as HSE chief executive in March 2026.

== Personal life ==
Gloster was born in Clare Street in Limerick. He resides with his family in Kildimo, County Limerick.
