= Midland Regional Hospital, Mullingar =

Hospital in County Westmeath, Ireland

Regional Hospital Mullingar
- Health Service Executive
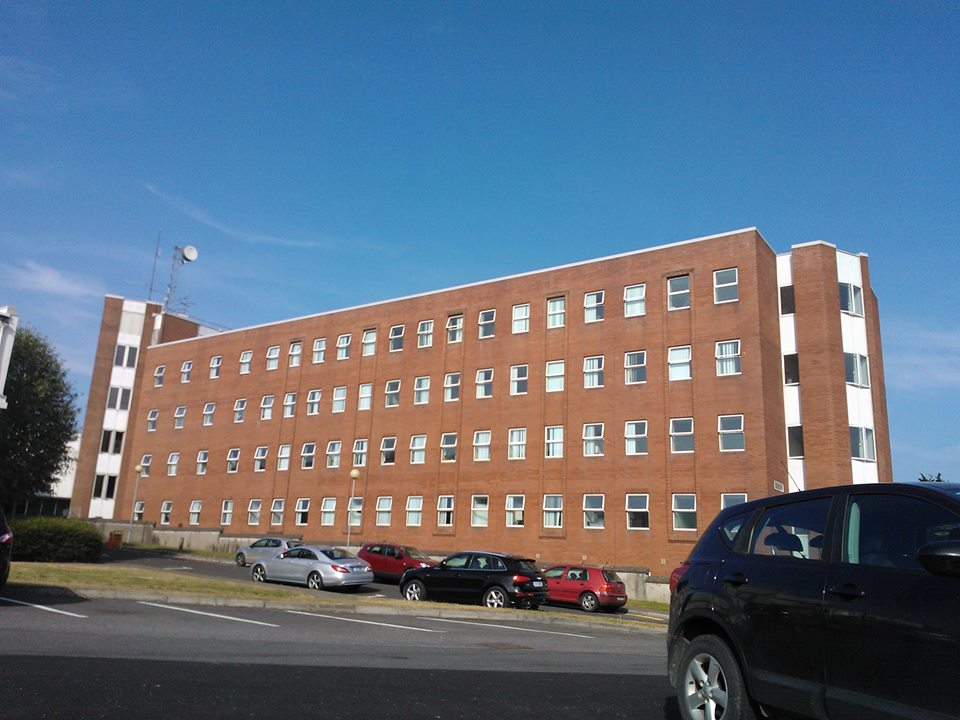
- Regional Hospital Mullingar

- Location in Ireland

Geography
- Location: Mullingar, County Westmeath, Ireland
- Coordinates: 53.534185°N 7.348961°W

Organisation
- Care system: HSE
- Type: Regional

Services
- Emergency department: Yes Accident & Emergency
- Beds: 204

History
- Founded: 1936

Links
- Website: www.iehg.ie/regional-hospital-mullingar
- Lists: Hospitals in the Republic of Ireland

The Midland Regional Hospital, Mullingar (Irish: Ospidéal Réigiúnach an Mhuilinn Chearr) is a public hospital at Mullingar in County Westmeath, Ireland. It is managed by Ireland East Hospital Group.

== History ==
The hospital was officially opened by Seán T. O'Kelly, Minister of Local Government and Public Health, as Westmeath County Hospital on 27 April 1936. It evolved to become the General Hospital, Mullingar and benefited from major extensions which opened in 1988 and 1994. In June 2010 some 4,000 people protested in Mullingar, concerned about the future of the hospital.

== Services ==
The hospital provides 204 beds and 6 critical care beds.

== See also ==
- Midland Regional Hospital, Portlaoise
- Midland Regional Hospital, Tullamore
