= Paul Reid (public servant) =

Former Director-General of Ireland's Health Service Executive

Chairperson of An Coimisiún Pleanála
- Incumbent
- Assumed office 17 June 2025
- Preceded by: Peter Mullan

Director-General of the Health Service Executive
- In office 2 April 2019 – 3 October 2022
- Preceded by: Tony O'Brien
- Succeeded by: Stephen Mulvany (Interim); Bernard Gloster

Personal details
- Born: 3 December 1964 (age 61) Finglas, Dublin, Ireland
- Other political affiliations: Worker's Party (1985/1986)
- Children: 2
- Education: National College of Ireland; Trinity College Dublin
- Salary: €50,000 (2025)

Paul Reid (born 3 December 1964) is an Irish public servant, who has served as chairperson of An Coimisiún Pleanála since June 2025. He served as Director-General of the Health Service Executive, the Irish national health service, from April 2019 to October 2022, He previously was chief executive of Fingal County Council from 2014 to 2019, and before that worked in the Department of Public Expenditure and Reform and an international development charity, after a 25-year career with telecom service provider Eircom and its predecessors.

== Life ==
=== Early life ===
Reid was born on 3 December 1964 and raised in Finglas, Dublin. He left school at age 16 with an Intermediate certificate.

At age 21, Reid was an active member of the Marxist–Leninist political party the Worker's Party. He received a nomination to run for election but pulled out at the last minute.

=== Career ===
At age 16, Reid began his first job as a trainee installer at the Department of Posts and Telegraphs. The job involved connecting landline telephones to homes and businesses, climbing telephone poles on the roadside to run lines. In 2005, Reid began his second job working for Eircom as an underground cable jointer and later qualified as a technician. By the time he left Eircom in 2010, he was executive director of networks and operations.

Studying at night, he took a Bachelor of Arts degree in human resources and industrial relations at the National College of Ireland, and later a Masters in Business Administration at Trinity College Dublin.

From 2010 to 2011, he was head of corporate affairs with international development charity Trócaire, where he worked on an agenda to strengthen the governance of the organisation and on the improvements in HR, finance, risk management and communications.

From 2011 to 2014, Reid worked in the Department of Public Expenditure and Reform as the chief operating officer. In this role, he had a leading role in the development, implementation and oversight of the government's reform programme across the civil and public service. His big project was to secure a saving of €1 billion in the second round of public service pay cuts, leading to the Haddington Road Agreement, a difficult proposition as ASTI rejected its findings.

In 2014, he was appointed chief executive of Fingal County Council.

Following an open competition by the Public Appointment Service, Reid was appointed to the position of Director-General at the Health Service Executive on 2 April 2019. In his role he led over 117,000 staff who delivered a wide range of health services across Ireland. He said that his vision for the health service was to focus on long term planning by implementing Sláintecare and delivering effective and safe services within available resources. Reid tweeted on Twitter that he left his position as Chief Executive of Fingal County Council on the same day he was appointed Director-General at the HSE. He earned a salary of €420,103 in 2021.

On 27 June 2022, Reid announced that he would be stepping down from his position as Director-General of the Health Service Executive at the end of the year "to spend time with his family". He stepped down on 3 October 2022 and was replaced by Chief Financial Officer Stephen Mulvany on an interim basis until a permanent replacement was found.

On 28 February 2023, it was announced that Reid had been appointed Chairperson of the Citizens' Assembly on Drugs Use in Ireland.

On 17 June 2025, Reid was named as the chairperson of An Coimisiún Pleanála, which replaced An Bord Pleanála, and would receive an annual salary of €50,000.

=== Personal life ===
Reid is married with two children, a son and a daughter. He resides in both Carrick on Shannon, County Leitrim and Finglas. He describes himself "as not a big reader" and enjoys listening to radio.
