= Health board (Ireland) =

- Bord Sláinte
- Logo of the Eastern Health Board

Publicly funded health service overview
- Formed: 1970
- Dissolved: 1 January 2005
- Superseding Publicly funded health service: Health Service Executive
- Jurisdiction: Ireland
- Parent department: Department of Health
- Key document: Health Act, 1970

The health board system of Ireland was created by the 1970 Health Act. This system was initially created with eight health boards, each of which were prescribed a functional area in which they operated. The system was reformed in 1999 from eight to eleven regional bodies.

On 1 January 2005, the health boards were replaced by the Health Service Executive.

== Background ==
Prior to the advent of the health board system, the Health Act 1947 was the principal legislation on the State's role in the provision of healthcare in Ireland; this was the act that served as the legislative basis for the Mother and Child Scheme, which was later withdrawn under Church and medical opposition.

Under the 1947 act, the health authority for a functional area was the administrative county or county borough. This reflected the fact that until 1947, the Department of Local Government and Public Health was responsible for public health. The Department of Health was created as a separate Department of state by the Ministers and Secretaries (Amendment) Act 1946.

In 1970, the healthcare system of Ireland was still very much a private and voluntary system with the Catholic Church still retaining effective control of healthcare, in particular, the ownership of hospitals and institutions. Doctors served very much in a sole trader capacity with the state taking few responsibilities beyond the organisation of the provision of healthcare to the disadvantaged.

== Health boards ==
In 1970, the Health Boards Regulations were made under the Health Act 1970 and defined among other things the functional area, membership and composition of each health board. Each health board was headed by a chief executive officer and more often assisted by an ad hoc management team consisting of professionals who were public servants.

| Health board | Code | Members | Functional area |
|---|---|---|---|
| Eastern Health Board | EHB | 35 | Dublin City, County Dublin, County Kildare, County Wicklow |
| Midland Health Board | MHB | 30 | County Laois, County Offaly, County Longford, County Westmeath |
| Mid-Western Health Board | MWHB | 28 | County Clare, Limerick City, County Limerick, Tipperary North Riding |
| North-Eastern Health Board | NEHB | 30 | County Louth, County Meath, County Cavan, County Monaghan |
| North-Western Health Board | NWHB | 27 | County Donegal, County Sligo, County Leitrim |
| South-Eastern Health Board | SEHB | 31 | County Carlow, County Kilkenny, County Wexford, Waterford City, County Waterford, Tipperary South Riding |
| Southern Health Board | SHB | 33 | Cork City, County Cork, County Kerry |
| Western Health Board† | WHB | 29 | County Galway, County Mayo, County Roscommon |

†In 1990, the functional area was changed to explicitly include the Galway City and as a result two board members were added to the board in accordance with the 1990 Health Boards (Amendment) Regulations. This change was due to the city obtaining county borough status on 1 January 1986 and thus the need for representation on the health board which had continued to be de facto responsible for health within the city in the interim period.

=== 1999 Reforms ===
The Eastern Health Board was the first health board dissolved, it served almost half the population of the state and covered the smallest geographical area of the then eight existent health boards.

In the late 1990s, the counties of Dublin, Kildare and Wicklow represented almost half of the population of the state and had only one health board, the Eastern Health Board. The rest of the state was served by seven health boards, each with a designated functional area. The 1999 Health (Eastern Regional Health Authority) Act was introduced and dissolved the Eastern Health Board and created four bodies in its place, thus bringing to eleven the number of regional health authorities and boards.

The Eastern Regional Health Authority (ERHA) was given overall responsibility for the former health board functional area, however the actual provision of services was delegated to three area health boards. These area health boards were; the Northern Area Health Board (NAHB), East Coast Area Health Board (ECAHB) and the South-Western Area Health Board (SWAHB).

The functional areas of the area health boards did not correspond exactly to the city and county council boundaries and instead were defined in the First Schedule of the Act. The 1999 Eastern Regional Health Authority (Area Health Boards) Regulations determined the composition of the board of each area health board. The composition of the Eastern Regional Health Authority was determined by the act.
