= Health Service Executive =

National public health and social services authority in Ireland

- Feidhmeannacht na Seirbhíse Sláinte

Publicly funded health service overview
- Formed: 1 January 2005
- Preceding Publicly funded health service: Health Board
- Jurisdiction: Ireland
- Headquarters: Dr Steevens' Hospital, Dublin 8, Ireland
- Employees: 151,661 whole-time equivalents (2025; HSE and Section 38 organisations)
- Annual budget: €29 billion (2026)
- Minister responsible: Jennifer Carroll MacNeill, TD, Minister for Health
- Publicly funded health service executives: Anne O'Connor, Director General; Ciarán Devane, Chairman
- Parent department: Department of Health
- Website: www.hse.ie

The Health Service Executive (HSE; Irish: Feidhmeannacht na Seirbhíse Sláinte) is the publicly funded healthcare system in Ireland, responsible for the provision of health and personal social services. It came into operation on 1 January 2005.

The current director-general is Anne O'Connor, who took up the new role on 23 March 2026, after Bernard Gloster retired.

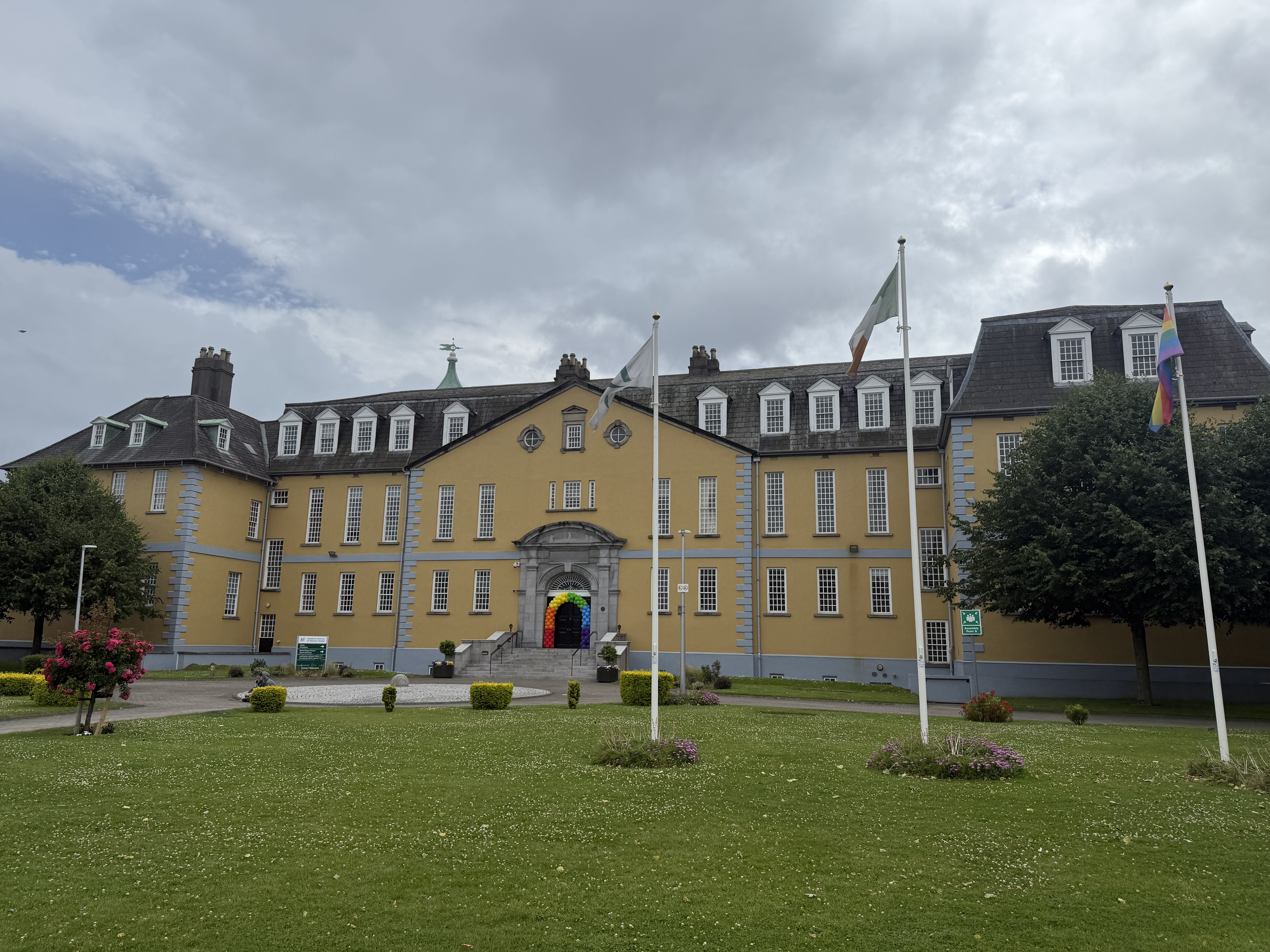
The headquarters of the HSE is located in Dr Steevens' Hospital.

== History ==
The Health Service Executive (HSE) was established by the Health Act 2004 and came into official operation on 1 January 2005. It replaced the ten regional Health Boards, the Eastern Regional Health Authority and a number of other different agencies and organisations. The Minister for Health retained overall responsibility for the Executive in Government. The HSE adopted a regional structure (HSE Dublin Mid-Leinster, HSE Dublin North East, HSE South and HSE West).

A new grouping of hospitals was announced by the Irish Minister for Health, Dr. James Reilly TD, in May 2013, as part of a restructure of Irish public hospitals and a goal of delivering better patient care:

- Dublin North East (subsequently renamed RCSI Hospitals)
- Dublin Midlands (subsequently renamed Dublin Midlands Hospital Group)
- Dublin East (subsequently renamed Ireland East Hospital Group)
- South/South West (subsequently renamed South/Southwest Hospital Group)
- West/North West (subsequently renamed Saolta University Health Care Group)
- Mid West (subsequently renamed UL Hospitals Group)

A new arrangement of 90 primary care networks was announced in October 2014.

=== 2022 senior management departures ===
On 4 April 2022, it was announced that the chief operations officer of the HSE – Anne O'Connor – would be leaving the organisation in the summer to take up a new role as managing director of VHI Health and Wellbeing.

On 27 June 2022, it was announced that the current director general of the HSE – Paul Reid – would be stepping down from his role in December to 'spend more time with family'.

On 16 August 2022, it was announced that the director general – Paul Reid – would be leaving on 3 October 2022, two months earlier than planned. His role was temporarily filled by the current chief financial officer – Stephen Mulvany. On 16 December 2022, the HSE announced the appointment of Bernard Gloster, former CEO of TUSLA Child and Family Agency, as the new director general of the HSE.

== Criticism and Controversies ==
The HSE is frequently portrayed by the Irish media as an inefficient, top-heavy and excessively bureaucratic organisation. The Irish health system has been involved in a number of serious health scandals, for example relating to cancer misdiagnoses in 2008. The HSE has also been the subject of criticism for cutbacks, service cancellations etc., but has indicated that it is making good progress in saving costs and achieving its required 'break-even' budget position for 2010.

In the same month, the Irish Medical Organisation stated that patients awaiting a HSE medical card were waiting up to six months to receive their card, and that their health was being put at risk as they could not afford medicines that they would have otherwise obtained had they received their card. The HSE has since announced a new online system for medical card applications that will reduce turnaround time for routine applications to 15 days.

In May 2011, key forensic evidence in up to 25 sexual-assault cases may be challenged in court because of a major administrative blunder by the HSE. The victims – some as young as 14 – were told by Gardaí about the incident, in which a nurse who carried out their forensic tests was unregistered. This could lead to the evidence being challenged.

In May 2018, in the midst of the CervicalCheck misdiagnoses controversy, Tony O'Brien announced his resignation as director-general of the HSE with effect from close of business on 11 May.

An Ombudsman report in October 2020 found that children with suspected disabilities are encountering delays of many years in having their needs properly assessed. The report said that this is 'a serious and ongoing violation of their rights'.

=== 2021 cyberattack ===
On 14 May 2021, the HSE suffered a major ransomware cyberattack which caused all of its IT systems nationwide to be shut down. It was the most significant cybercrime attack on an Irish state agency and the largest known attack against a health service computer system.

Wizard Spider, a criminal gang believed to be operating from Russia, were suspected of being responsible for the cyberattack.

The ransomware cyberattack, which occurred during the COVID-19 pandemic, had a significant impact on hospital appointments across the country, with many appointments cancelled including all outpatient and radiology services.

A report into the attack showed that the HSE used unsecured systems and the hackers got in eight weeks earlier than thought.

== See also ==
- Department of Health (Ireland)
- Health Information and Quality Authority
- Health and Social Care (Northern Ireland)
