= Philip Lynch =

Irish businessman (born 1946)

Philip Lynch (born 1946) is an Irish businessman who was chief executive at two public limited companies and multiple senior directorships, including chairman of the board at the Irish postal service, An Post. In October 2010, he was forced by the minister for health at the time, Mary Harney, to resign his position as chairman of the National Paediatric Hospital Development Board over his desire to relocate the new Irish children's hospital from Dublin city centre to a site near the M50 motorway.

== Background and education ==
Lynch was born at Innishannon, County Cork, where he was educated at Hamilton High School. He also attended Copsewood College in County Limerick and studied accountancy and economics at Waterford Regional Technical College.

== Business career ==
Lynch formerly served as the chief executive of IAWS, a non executive director for Aryzta AG and Hiestand Holding AG, the chief executive officer and executive director for One51 plc, and as the director for Irish Pride Bakeries Ltd.

After 1995, he formerly served as the Independent non-executive director, a member of the Nomination Committee and a member of the Remuneration Committee for FBD Holdings plc., and was the non-executive director and director of Irish food marketing for Irish Life & Permanent Group Holdings plc from 2003 to 2005.

From 2004, Lynch worked for Heiton Group plc and C&C Group plc, the former of which he was a non-executive director as well as a Nominations Committee member and Remuneration Committee member. For C&C Group plc., he was the non-executive director, a subcommittee chairman, a chairman of the Remuneration Committee, and a Nomination Committee member.

== Children's hospital controversy ==
In 2007, he was appointed by Minister for Health, Mary Harney as chairman of the National Paediatric Hospital Development Board. This was to be a €650m project to build a new national children's hospital adjacent to the Mater Misericordiae University Hospital in Dublin's city centre. The new hospital would merge the secondary and tertiary care functions of three existing children's hospitals in Dublin: Our Lady's Children's Hospital, Crumlin; Temple Street Children's University Hospital; and the National Children's Hospital at Tallaght Hospital.

In 2010, Lynch met the Crumlin Hospital Foundation to discuss the possibility of relocating the new hospital to the Crumlin Hospital site. He also met with property developer Noel Smyth to discuss relocating the hospital to a site outside the M50 owned by Smyth. When Lynch sought to present to the board a proposal to build the new hospital on Smyth's land, he was obliged to resign his position by Mary Harney. He was replaced as chairman by businessman John Gallagher.

In March 2011, after a new health minister was appointed following a general election, Lynch went on radio to argue that the a city centre location for the new hospital would be inaccessible and have parking difficulties. He said that the "people who designed the M50, when that was agreed on, everything was going to happen outside of that" and described the city centre as a 'cul-de-sac'. He described the decision to locate the hospital in the city centre as "political".

== One51 shareholder revolt ==
In 2010, Philip Lynch was paid €1.4m including a bonus as chief executive of One51 plc. A shareholder revolt ensued at the company's AGM in July. Rebel shareholders led by Gerry Killen, Alf Smiddy, Mike Soden and Peter Brennan, criticised Lynch's remuneration in a year in which the company reported a loss of €11m and challenged his reappointment.

== Court case over bank loan ==
In March 2011, a court hearing was held in relation to an unpaid loan of €25m owed to Allied Irish Banks by Lynch, his wife and four children. The loan was secured on land in Waterford. In his defence, Lynch said that the loan was made on a non-recourse basis.
