= Children's Health Ireland =

Statutory body, oversees paediatric hospitals

Children's Health Ireland (CHI; Irish: Sláinte Leanaí Éireann, SLÉ) is a statutory body established in 2018 to oversee the development and governance of specialist acute paediatric hospital services in the Republic of Ireland. The name "Phoenix Children's Health" had originally been announced for this entity in 2017, but that name was abandoned following legal action from Phoenix Children's Hospital.

On 1 January 2019, CHI took over governance of the three tertiary children's hospitals in Dublin (Our Lady's Children's Hospital, Crumlin, Temple Street Children's University Hospital, and the National Children's Hospital). In doing so, it succeeded the Children's Hospital Group, which had previously been formed in August 2013 with a view to integrating these three separate hospitals under a single board of management.

The three hospitals will eventually transfer their operations to National Children's Hospital Ireland, a tertiary children's hospital that is currently under construction on the campus of St. James's Hospital in Dublin.

Other CHI centres include:

- Children's Health Ireland at Connolly, an outpatients' and urgent care centre (colocated with Connolly Hospital)
- Children's Health Ireland at Tallaght, an outpatients' and urgent care centre (colocated with Tallaght University Hospital)

The name was planned to be extended outside of Dublin and throughout the Republic of Ireland on a phased basis,

In September 2025, it was announced that, following a period of controversy over governance issues and issues around spinal surgery and scoliosis waiting lists, CHI will be fully integrated into the HSE by 2027
