= National Orthopaedic Hospital Cappagh =

Hospital in Dublin, Ireland

- Health Service Executive
- Shown in Dublin

Geography
- Location: Finglas, Ireland
- Coordinates: 53.3941°N 6.3296°W

Organisation
- Type: Specialist

Services
- Speciality: Orthopaedics

History
- Founded: 1921

Links
- Website: https://nohc.ie/

National Orthopaedic Hospital Cappagh (Irish: Ospidéal Náisiúnta Ortaipéideach Cheapach), situated in Finglas, Dublin, is the largest orthopaedic hospital in Ireland. It is managed by Ireland East Hospital Group.

== History ==
Lady Martin, widow of Sir Richard Martin, died in 1907 and bequeathed Cappagh House to the Religious Sisters of Charity "to provide a school for poor children in the neighbourhood". However, it was not situated in a populated area and, from 1921, it was used as a convalescent home for children and a training school for nursery nurses. It was occupied by children who needed long-term treatment with illness such as rickets, tuberculosis, and malnutrition. A school for the children was opened in 1923. The hospital's early development was led by Catherine Cummins (also known by her religious name Mother Mary Polycarp). She organised fundraising and had a key role in transforming Cappagh House into an orthopaedic hospital.

Building work, up to the mid-1950s, increased the number of beds and cots from 60 to 260, and new operating suite, X-ray department, and a physiotherapy department were added. From the mid-1950s fewer children were admitted following the discoveries of newer medical treatments and the number of beds was reduced to 164, and more beds were used for adults. From 1961 building modifications equipped the hospital to perform orthopaedic operations. It is now a major tertiary orthopaedic hospital, and provides tertiary elective orthopaedic services for the hospitals of the region including St. Vincent's Hospital, Mater Hospital, Beaumont Hospital, Connolly Hospital, Temple Street Children's University Hospital and the Central Remedial Clinic.

A new post-anesthetic care unit was opened at the hospital in 2016.
