= Catherine Cummins =

Personal life
- Born: 6 February 1879 Dublin, Ireland
- Died: 11 November 1967 (aged 88) Blackrock, Dublin

Religious life
- Religion: Roman Catholic
- Order: Religious Sisters of Charity

Catherine Cummins or Mother Mary Polycarp (6 February 1879 – 11 November 1967) was an Irish Sister of Charity nun and founder member of Cappagh Orthopaedic Hospital.

== Early life ==
Catherine Cummins was born at 22/22a Richmond Street, Dublin on 6 February 1879. Her parents were Patrick and Mary Cummins (née Kelly). She was one of 13 children. Her father was a proprietor of four pawnbroking establishments in Dublin. She was schooled at the Ursuline convent, Waterford. After returning to Dublin, Cummins would visit the Children's Hospital, Temple Street, and became interested in nursing children. Along with her sister Mary, Cummins entered the Sisters of Charity, entering the Sisters of Charity convent in Milltown on 16 August 1898 at age 19 taking the name Polycarp.

== Career ==
She professed on 19 February 1901, going to Temple Street to train in children's nursing. She was appointed superior of the Temple Street community in 1913. During the War of Independence, Cummins was sympathetic to republicans and sheltered some of them who were on the run. The order had been bequeathed Cappagh House in 1908, which they planned to adapt into an open-air orthopaedic hospital in 1920. It had been used as a training school for nursery nurses with a secular matron. Cummins was asked to take over the preparations for the hospital while still superior of Temple Street.

To form the nucleus of this modern hospital, three army huts were purchased. The children who had been in residence there were sent home at Christmas 1920 at the end of their term of convalescence, allowing work to begin on the hospital. St Mary's Open-air Orthopaedic Hospital was opened in 1921. The House became the home of the sisters in 1924, with Cummins as the superior having trained as an orthopaedic nurse in Pinner, Middlesex, England and being a state registered nurse. Cappagh Hospital was an officially recognised training school for nurses by 1930.

The children were both nursed and educated while living in the Hospital, with the school recognised by the national board of education from 1923. The children were taught from their beds, and the younger children were schooled with the Montessori method. The first Irish troupe of Invalid Boy Scouts was formed in Cappagh. For the 1932 Eucharistic Congress, a high platform with steps, with loudspeakers and glass walls was erected on O'Connell Bridge. Cummins purchased it for Cappagh. It was jokingly called "Polly's folly", and that December was used for the altar for the Christmas mass.

Cummins later worked at St Mary's Hospital, Baldoyle, an auxiliary hospital to Cappagh, working with children with physical disabilities. She started the "Little Willie" committee which fund-raised to pay the hospital's debts. She then transferred to Harold's Cross, working in Our Lady's Hospice to extend the accommodation provided. She moved to Linden Convalescent Home, Blackrock. She died there on 11 November 1967, and is buried in the convent cemetery in Donnybrook.
