= Sarah Atkinson =

Irish writer (1823–1893)

Sarah (née Gaynor) Atkinson (23 October 1823 – 8 July 1893) was an Irish writer, biographer, essayist and philanthropist.

== Biography ==
She was the eldest daughter of John and Anne Gaynor, of Athlone, County Roscommon. At the age of fifteen she moved with her family to Dublin where her education was completed. Two of her sisters, Anna and Marcella, became nuns with Religious Sisters of Charity. At twenty-five, she married the much older George Atkinson, a medical doctor and, with Sir John Gray, joint proprietor of the Freeman's Journal. They were both interested in art and Sarah accompanied her husband on many trips abroad, taking in the cultural centres of Europe. At home they made the acquaintance of prominent politicians, journalists and musicians. Regular guests at their house were Dr. John Shaw, editor of the Evening Mail, Rosa Mulholland and Katharine Tynan.

The loss of her only child in his fourth year deeply affected Mrs. Atkinson and she threw herself into charitable and other good works. She moved with her husband to Drumcondra in Dublin, where she made the acquaintance of Mrs. Ellen Woodlock. Ellen Woodlock, a sister of Francis Sylvester Mahony, was born in Cork in 1811 and had been married in 1830 and widowed quite young, just before the birth of her only son. Ellen was the sister in law of Rev. Dr. Bartholomew Woodlock, who was President of All Hallows College. She intended joining a religious community in France but after spending a few years in that country (with her son in a nearby school) returned to Cork and then moved to Dublin. At this time the post-famine city was inundated with poverty-stricken families and abandoned children. Fever and disease were rife, and the Poor Law of the day was insufficient to meet the needs of the starving population. Many evictions were taking place in deplorable circumstances, which forced the poor, however reluctantly, to seek refuge in the workhouses. The most vulnerable sections of the community were single women (including widows) and children. Ellen Woodlock was totally against placing children in workhouses and founded St. Joseph's Institute in 1855 to rescue girls from that situation. With her Mrs. Atkinson interested herself in the female paupers of the South Dublin Union. With much difficulty in the 1860s she gained permission for ladies like herself to enter and inspect the condition of young girls in the North and South Dublin Unions, after which she opened a better home to which many were transferred. She campaigned for years to improve the state of the workhouses and provide better conditions for the poverty-stricken. One of her sisters ran the Hospice for the Dying in Dublin, to which she donated funds. She helped Ellen Woodlock establish the Children's Hospital at 9 Buckingham Street in 1872, which later moved to Temple St., which she visited every day. Every week she visited hospitals and prisons, in the 1880s accompanying Katharine Tynan to visit the last of the Land Leaguers incarcerated in Kilmainham Gaol.

From the 1850s Atkinson contributed a large number of historical and biographical articles and essays to several publications, including Duffy's Hibernian Magazine, The Month, The Nation and the Freeman's Journal. She later wrote for the Irish Monthly after it was established, and for the Irish Quarterly Review. Her Life of Mary Aikenhead was published in 1875 and was very well received. She followed this with biographies of the Irish sculptors John Henry Foley and John Hogan and also a life of Catherine of Siena. A collection of her essays, with a preface and biography by Rosa Mulholland, was published posthumously in 1895.
