= Ellen Woodlock =

Irish philanthropist (1811–1884)

- Born: Ellen Mahony; 27 January 1811; Cork, Ireland
- Died: 13 July 1884 (aged 73); 8 Sydney Place, Cork
- Burial place: St. Joseph's Cemetery, Cork
- Occupation: Philanthropist
- Relatives: Francis Sylvester Mahony (brother); Bartholomew Woodlock (brother-in-law)

Ellen Woodlock (27 January 1811 – 13 July 1884), born Ellen Mahony, was an Irish philanthropist. With Sarah Atkinson she helped establish a number of institutions to provide social services in Dublin, including Ireland's first children's hospital.

== Early life ==
Woodlock was born in Cork in 1811, the daughter of Martin Mahony and Maria Reynolds Mahony. Her father ran a successful wool milling business. One of her brothers was writer Francis Sylvester Mahony.

== Career in philanthropy ==
In 1843, Woodlock lived with and planned to join the Sisters of St. Louis, a religious community in Juilly, France, while her son attended a school run by the same order. she returned to Cork by 1851, then moved to Dublin. In Drumcondra she met Sarah Atkinson with whom she worked on many initiatives. "If Mrs. Woodlock's impetuosity would sometimes incur a risk," Atkinson later recalled, "Mrs. Atkinson's prudence and perseverance kept the brake on the wheel." She and Atkinson opened St. Joseph's Industrial Institute in Dublin in 1855, a training school for girls, which also operated a laundry, workshops for sewing and knitting, and a school. American reformer Caroline Healey Dall recounted Woodlock's "intelligent moral effort" as an example for American women to follow.

Along with her daughter in law and Sarah Atkinson, Woodlock established the Children's Hospital at 9 Buckingham Street in 1872, which later moved to Temple Street; it was the first pediatric hospital in Ireland. "Many who lay in the little beds with crooked limbs and twistered feet are now strong men and women, taking an active part in the world," according to Rosa Mulholland Gilbert's account in 1893.

With local official John Lentaigne and funds from Charles Bianconi, Woodlock worked to establish the Sisters of St. Louis as a community in Monaghan, and opened a reformatory and workhouse there.

== Personal life and legacy ==
Mahony married Thomas Woodlock in 1830. Her husband died in 1834, just before the birth of their only son, Thomas. Her brother-in-law Bartholomew Woodlock, who was President of All Hallows College and Rector of the Catholic University of Ireland. She died on 13 July 1884, at the age 73, at her brother's house in Cork. There is a Woodlock Family History Scrapbook in the Irish Capuchin Archives, which includes clippings related to Ellen Woodlock. The children's hospital she helped to establish continues in operation as Children's Health Ireland at Temple Street, as of 2025. Woodlock and Atkinson were remembered as its founders when the hospital marked its 100th anniversary in 1974.
