= Clara Mulholland =

British writer (1849–1934)

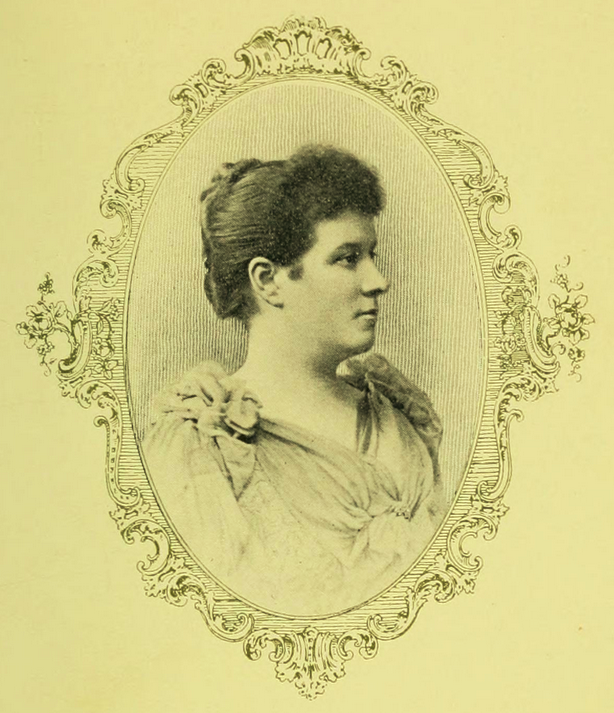
- Photo in A Round table of the representative Irish and English Catholic novelists, 1897
- Born: 1849; Belfast
- Died: 1934 (aged 84–85); South Terrace, Littlehampton, Sussex
- Occupation: Writer
- Relatives: Rosa Mulholland (sister); Charles Russell, Baron Russell of Killowen (brother-in-law); Sir John Thomas Gilbert (brother-in-law)
- Writing career
- Language: English
- Genres: novels; children's literature; playwright; translations

Clara Mulholland (1849–1934) (Note: Atkinson (2016) records Clara's years of birth and death as: ca. 1850-1934. Mitchell & Rentschler (2016) record Clara's years of birth and death as: ca. 1856 - ca. 1934.) was a writer who was born in Belfast but moved to England at an early age. In addition to being a prolific novelist since the 1880s, she wrote children's literature, plays, and was a translator from French into English.

== Early life and education ==
Clara Mulholland was born in Belfast in 1849. Her father was Joseph Stevenson Mulholland, a medical doctor. Her siblings included older sisters Rosa, Lady Gilbert (wife of Sir John Thomas Gilbert) and Ellen, Lady Russell (wife of Charles Russell, Baron Russell of Killowen, Lord Chief Justice of England), as well as a brother, William Mulholland.

The siblings belonged to a County Antrim family which had many representatives in the U.S. bearing the names of Mulholland, Mullholland, Milholland, and Millholland. Members of the most prominent branch of the family were for a century leading cotton spinners of Belfast, the eldest line of which was elevated to the British peerage as Barons of Dunleath.

Clara left Belfast at a very early age. She was educated in Loughborough, Leicestershire, England, at a convent of the Sisters of Providence of the Institute of Charity, and afterwards at a convent of the Dames de Marie, Coloma, Belgium.

== Career ==
Percy's revenge

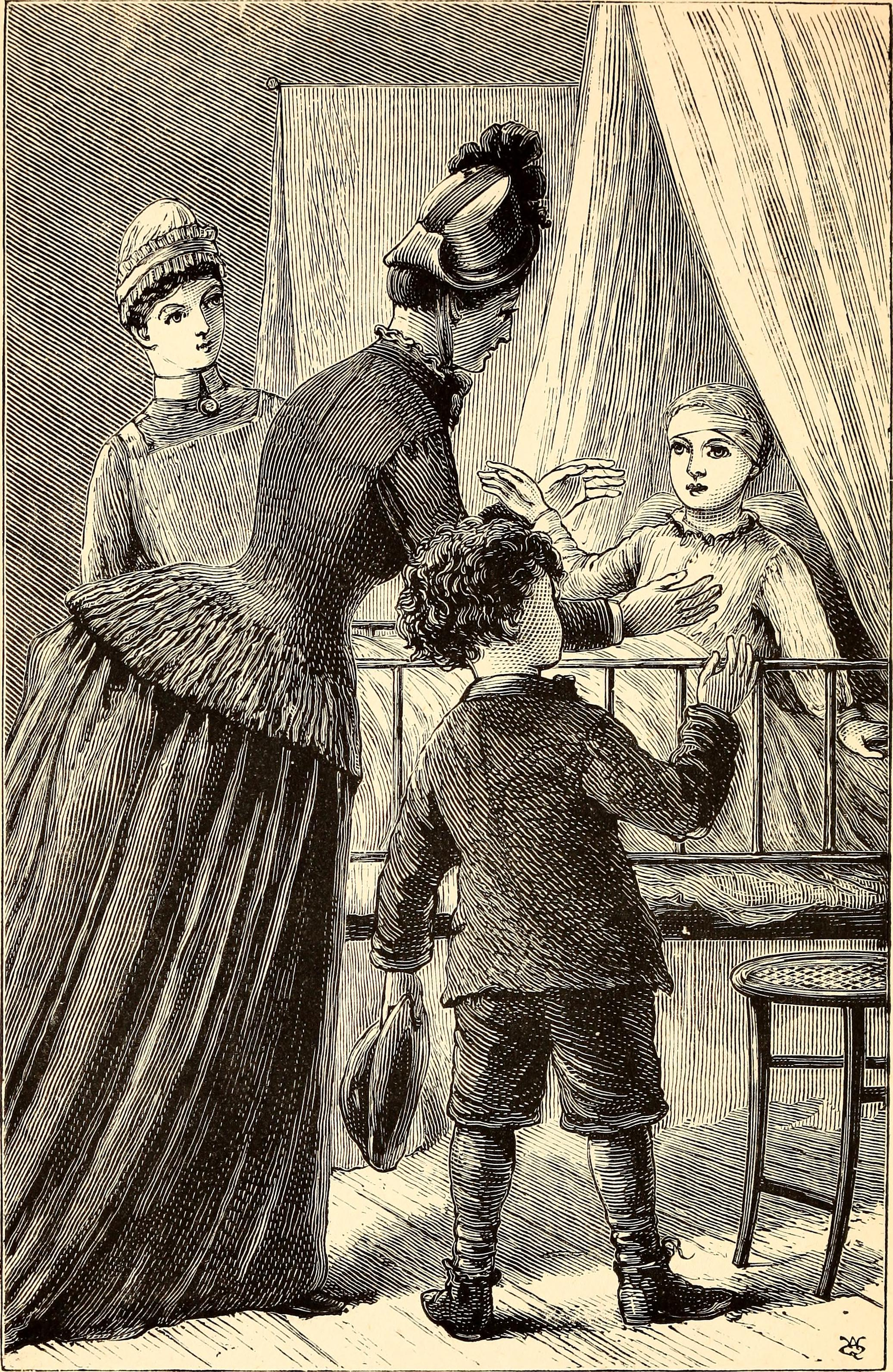
The strange adventures of little Snowdrop and other tales

Kathleen Mavourneen

Bunt and Bill

The Senior lieutenant's wager - and other stories

Her first story for young children, was published by Messrs. Marcus, Ward & Co., of Belfast, and by John Murphy, of Baltimore. Then followed - Naughty Miss Bunny, The Strange Adventures of Little Snowdrop, and Little Merry Face and His Crown of Content. Later, Mulholland wrote stories for various London magazines and papers, and for Messrs. Tillotson & Sons, of Bolton, and the National Press Agency, London. Her other books were, A Striking Contrast, Kathleen Mavourneen and Linda's Misfortunes and Little Brian's trip to Dublin.

Her translation of The Little Hunchback, by the Comtesse de Segur, was published in London, 1876, with a new edition in 1883. The translation for Mystical Flora of St. Francis de Sales was published in London, 1880. Another translation included The Power of St. Joseph - A Book of Meditations and Devotions in honour of the Foster-Father of Our Lord, by the Rev. Father Huguet, S.M.; translated from the French by Clara Mulholland (Dublin : McGlashan and Gill, 1876).

Bound Together - Six Short Plays for Home and School (Baltimore : John Murphy & Co., 1897) was co-authored by Clara and Rosa.

Other works followed including, The Little Bogtrotters; or, A Few Weeks at Conmore (London, 1878), Little Brian's Trip to Dublin (London, 1885), The Miser of King's Court (London, 1887), Percy's Revenge (Dublin, 1887), In A Roundabout Way (1908), and Sweet Doreen (1915).

== Death ==
Clara Mulholland died at her home in South Terrace, Littlehampton, Sussex, in 1934.

== Selected works ==
=== Books ===
- Mystical flora of St. Francis de Sales : or, the Christian life under the emblem of plants , 1877
- The Little Bogtrotters; or, A Few Weeks at Conmore, 1878
- Naughty Miss Bunny : a story for little children, 1882
- Linda's Misfortunes and Little Brian's trip to Dublin, 1885
- The Miser of King's Court, 1887
- Percy's Revenge - a story for boys, 1887
- The Strange Adventures of Little Snowdrop, 1889
- Kathleen Mavourneen, 1890
- Little Merry Face and his crown of content : and other tales, 1891
- Ella's sacrifice, 1891
- Little Larry, 1891
- The O'Briens' Christmas, 1892
- A Striking Contrast, 1895
- Bunt and Bill, 1902
- The Senior lieutenant's wager - and other stories, 1905
- The lost chord, 1905
- In A Roundabout Way, 1908
- Through mist and shadow, 1909
- Sweet Doreen, 1915
- Skenet bedrager : Roman, 1920
- Her last message, 1926
- Little Merry Face and His Crown of Content
- The little house under the hill
- Sheila's Presentiment
- "The Lost Chord" (Collins' Clear-Type Press)

=== Plays ===
- Miss Carnduff's Next-of-Kin a Comedietta in Two Acts. Act II, 1884
- Bound Together - Six Short Plays for Home and School (Baltimore : John Murphy & Co., 1897); co-authored by Clara and Rosa Mulholland.

=== Articles ===
- "Dave's Repentance"
- "Terence O'Neill's heiress", 1907
- "Mistress Mary", 1912

=== Translations ===
- The Little Hunchback, by the Comtesse de Segur, 1876
- The Power of St. Joseph - A Book of Meditations and Devotions in honour of the Foster-Father of Our Lord. (By the Rev. Father Huguet, S.M. Translated from the French by Clara Mulholland. Dublin : McGlashan and Gill, 1876)
- For little children. Advice on Piety. (By Louis-Gaston de Ségur. Translated by Clara Mulholland. 1895)
