= List of supermarket chains in Monaco =

This is a list of supermarket chains in Monaco.

- Carrefour
- Casino Supermarché
- Intermarché Express
- Marché U (Système U)
- Picard Surgelés
- Spar

== Defunct brands ==
- Rotana
- Écomarché
- Zall
- Kosmin
- Zerbas
- Galaxias
- Tom
- Economy (closed of 2008, shops later Closed the 2014 Market In )
