= Frank Dolphin =

Irish businessman

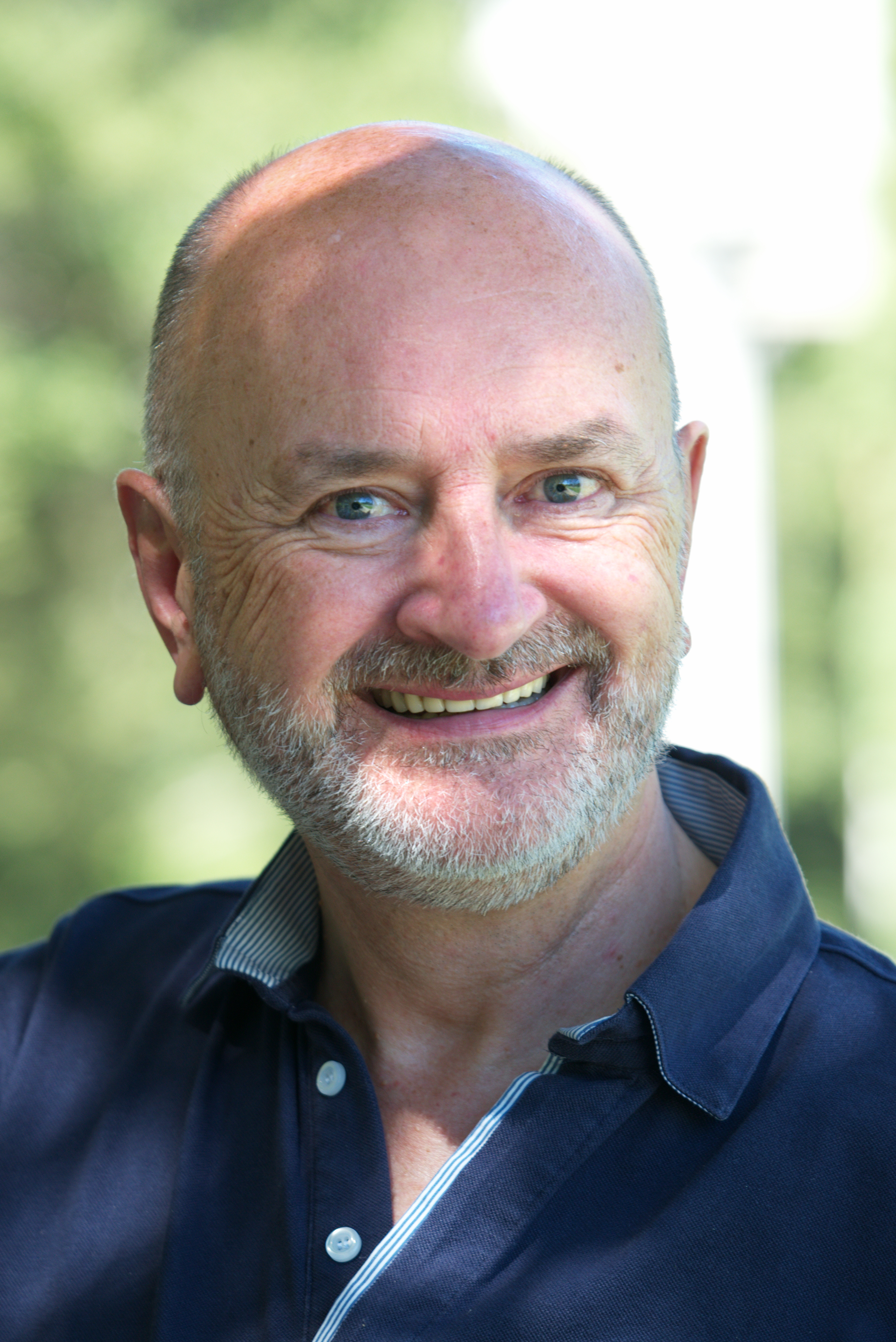
- Dolphin in 2024
- Born: January 1959 (age 67); Birr, County Offaly, Ireland
- Education: University College Dublin
- Occupations: Psychologist; businessman
- Known for: Founder of RigneyDolphin Ltd.; Co-Founder of RelateCare; Chairman of Health Service Executive
- Spouse: Adrienne Dolphin
- Children: 5

Frank Dolphin (born January 1959) is an Irish psychologist and businessman known for his involvement with the Irish Health Service, as a former chairman of Temple Street Children's University Hospital, Governor of the Mater Hospital, and as a past president of the Waterford Chamber of Commerce. He co-founded RigneyDolphin Ltd. and RelateCare.

== Education ==
Dolphin was born in Birr, County Offaly and attended Presentation College in Birr. He subsequently attended University College Dublin, where he obtained a PhD in psychology. His early research on information models in speech fluency was recognised by the British Psychological Society when he was awarded their Young Psychologist of the year award for his post graduate research.

He lectured at Trinity College Dublin (covering the topics of Psychology and Consumer Behaviour) while working on his PhD at Temple Street. After obtaining his PhD he moved to Waterford and set up the department of Psychology at the Waterford Institute of Technology (then Regional Technical College) and was responsible for introducing counselling and medical services there. He also worked as a consulting psychologist for St Joseph's Industrial School, Clonmel.

Dolphin has served on the board of Governors of the Waterford Institute of Technology.

== Business career ==
=== RigneyDolphin Ltd. ===
In 1990, Dolphin left the WIT and founded RigneyDolphin Ltd. He remains chairman of the firm. The firm initially offered a range of recruitment, HR and consultancy services but in recent years have focused on business support services catering to national and international clients.

In 2010 RigneyDolphin employed 1,200 staff at offices in Dublin, Dundalk, Derry and Waterford with an annual turnover of €20.2 million.

=== RelateCare ===
In 2013, Dolphin co-founded RelateCare with his wife Adrienne and Conor O'Byrne. RelateCare provides healthcare outsourcing and consultancy services, including appointment scheduling and post-discharge follow-up calls for hospital groups in the United States. The company also provides a nurse-on-call service staffed by US-registered nurses based in Cleveland and Waterford. In Ireland, RelateCare has worked with the Health Service Executive on smoking-cessation support services.

According to MML Capital Partners, RelateCare began as a joint venture between Cleveland Clinic and RigneyDolphin, and in October 2019 it agreed an investment deal with MML Ireland, which became the largest single equity holder.

== Health Service ==
In 2009 Dolphin was appointed chairman of Temple Street Children's University Hospital.

In July 2010 the Minister for Health and Children Mary Harney announced that Dolphin would assume the role of Chairman of the Health Service Executive with effect from 15 August 2010. Dolphin stepped down from this role in December 2011.

In March 2012 Dolphin was chosen to lead the review group for the construction of the National Children's Hospital Ireland, following the refusal by An Bord Pleanála to give planning permission for the proposed Children's Hospital of Ireland at a site on Eccles Street. Enda Kenny stated that the report this group put forward (the "Dolphin Report") would be the only one used to decide on the location of the proposed hospital. The Dolphin Report did not rank locations, but left the final decision to the cabinet; in the end, St. James's Hospital was chosen as the site for the new children's hospital, with a €500m budget being allocated to the project.

== Chamber of Commerce ==
Dolphin was President of the Waterford Chamber of Commerce in 2005-2006. While President, he presented a paper to the World Chambers Federation's 4th World Chamber Congress in Durban on "Training Solutions", Waterford Chamber's training and development business, in conjunction with Training Solutions founder and Deputy CEO of Waterford Chamber Michael Cox.
