= National Children's Hospital Ireland =

Paediatric hospital under construction in Dublin, Ireland

- Children's Health Ireland

Geography
- Location: Dublin, Ireland
- Coordinates: 53.33901°N 6.29889°W

Organisation
- Type: Teaching
- Network: Children's Health Ireland

Services
- Speciality: Children's hospital

Links
- Website: www.newchildrenshospital.ie
- Lists: Hospitals in the Republic of Ireland

National Children's Hospital Ireland (NCHI; Irish: Ospidéal Náisiúnta Leanaí Éireann) is a children's hospital under construction in Dublin, Ireland, as a regional secondary and national tertiary centre. Referred to throughout most of the project simply as the new children's hospital, it was given its name in June 2025.

The new hospital, on the same campus as the existing St. James's Hospital, will combine the services previously provided at Dublin's three tertiary children's hospitals: Children's Health Ireland at Crumlin (formerly Our Lady's Children's Hospital); Children's Health Ireland at Temple Street (formerly Temple Street Children's University Hospital); and Children's Health Ireland at Tallaght (formerly the National Children's Hospital at Tallaght University Hospital).

NCHI is planned to be the lead centre in the Children's Health Ireland network, which is proposed to encompass all acute paediatric services in Ireland. In addition to the main hospital at St James's, satellite centres are expected to operate attached to Tallaght Hospital and Connolly Hospital providing local urgent care and outpatient services.

As of April 2026, the planned completion date is unknown.

== History ==
=== Background ===
The consolidation of Ireland's three tertiary paediatric hospitals (Our Lady's Children's Hospital, Temple Street Children's University Hospital, the National Children's Hospital) into a single hospital was first proposed in 1993 by the Faculty of Paediatrics at the Royal College of Physicians of Ireland. The proposal was not acted on and plans were put in place to develop the three hospitals separately. In 2005, the Health Service Executive was established, as a new agency to manage the health service. Brendan Drumm, Professor of Paediatrics at University College Dublin and Our Lady's Children's Hospital, was appointed as its first CEO. Professor Drumm was one of the authors of the 1993 Faculty of Paediatrics proposal. In 2005, the HSE commissioned McKinsey & Company to undertake a review of the strategic organisation of tertiary paediatric services for Ireland that would be in the best interests of children. Pending the outcome of this review, the HSE stopped the redevelopment of Temple St, Children's University Hospital on a site close by the Mater Misericordiae University Hospital; Professor Drumm, the HSE CEO, said the development of one world-class hospital was the way forward rather than three separate hospitals, and he would not sign off on this expenditure. This decision was severely criticised by many paediatricians who described it as "sabotage" and as being "a major lost opportunity for children".

The McKinsey & Company report on the findings of its review, Children's Health First, was published in 2006. It recommended that, in view of Ireland's size and expected demand, there should be a single tertiary paediatric hospital based in Dublin, with good transport and access links, room for future expansion, ideally co-located with a leading tertiary adult centre, and "at the nexus of an integrated paediatric service" with urgent care centres around Dublin and with regional children's hospitals around the country. It calculated the total bed requirements to be 380 (285 inpatient, 54 ICU beds and 41 day beds). McKinsey was not asked to identify a site but proposed nine assessment criteria for making a decision on the best location and model. One of the paediatricians who contributed to the McKinsey report confirmed that their remit was not to select a site. This recommendation was initially welcomed by almost all the stakeholders, including the three tertiary hospitals. It was also quickly accepted by Government and it agreed to proceed with the single tertiary hospital model with satellite urgent care centres. Because the location for the new hospital had yet to be selected, the Irish Times Health correspondent at the time Eithne Donnellan suggested that "the real battle may only be starting". Her concern was based on the long history of rivalry between the three children's hospitals described by one paediatrician as "continuous internecine trench warfare"

=== 2006–2012: Mater site ===
Later in 2006, a task force composed of representatives from the Department of Health, the Health Service Executive and the Office of Public Works selected a site on the Mater Misericordiae University Hospital campus in north central Dublin as the location of the future tertiary hospital. The selection process was criticised by both the National Children's Hospital and by Our Lady's Children's Hospital. A patient interest group said it was gravely concerned at the decision of these hospitals to oppose the Mater site. Another parents group which had been campaigning for a new hospital for many years said: "It would seem to us to be immoral and wrong for the development of this hospital to be delayed by even one day due to further debates and disputes over its location." Our Lady's Children's Hospital decided to withdraw from the process and announced that it was instead considering the rebuilding of its hospital. The National Children's Hospital called for the new hospital to be based across two sites; at its hospital in Tallaght and the Mater Misericordiae University Hospital campus

The Government accepted the recommendation and in 2007 the Minister for Health, Mary Harney, established a National Paediatric Hospital Development Board (NPHDB) to oversee the project. The chairman of the board, Philip Lynch, resigned unexpectedly in October 2010 citing "significant and fundamental differences" with Harney over the chosen location of the hospital, as well as over funding arrangements and governance. Lynch had met with the property developer Noel Smyth and with staff from Our Lady's Children's Hospital and had come to favour an alternative plan, whereby the hospital would be built on greenfield land owned by Smyth in Newlands Cross outside central Dublin. Harney announced that she had requested Lynch's resignation, stating that "it is not in the remit of the Development Board to revisit the Government decision taken on the location of the new hospital". Lynch was replaced as chairman of the NPHDB by the businessman John Gallagher, who himself resigned only months later in March 2011, saying that he "no longer feels that he has the mandate to continue with his original remit to build the hospital at the Mater site", since the new Minister for Health, James Reilly, had publicly considered reviewing the decision to locate the new hospital there.

Reilly went on to assemble an independent group of international experts from children's hospitals in Boston, Sydney and London as well as internationally recognised architects to review the process. In July 2011 this group "made a unanimous and unequivocal recommendation" that the Mater site remained the best of the available options, and the NPHDB formally applied for planning permission on 20 July, naming the project as the "Children's Hospital of Ireland". The application was contested and went through an appeals process. In February 2012, An Bord Pleanála announced that it had refused permission for the project, stating in its decision that "by reason of its height, scale, form and mass, located on this elevated site, [the hospital] would result in a dominant, visually incongruous structure and would have a profound negative impact on the appearance and visual amenity of the city skyline," as well as constituting over development of the Mater campus and detracting from the historic character of the surrounding area.

=== 2012 onwards: St. James's site ===
In the wake of the refusal of planning permission, Reilly tasked another review group (led by the businessman Frank Dolphin) to determine other options for the new hospital. The report proposed nine assessment criteria for making a decision on the best location and model. Prioritising colocation with an existing adult teaching hospital – and, ideally, "trilocation" with a maternity hospital as well – the group sought submissions from six adult hospitals within Dublin. It received proposals from the Mater (revised from the previous project that had been rejected), Beaumont Hospital, St James's Hospital, Tallaght Hospital, and Connolly Hospital, as well as a proposal from the Coombe Women & Infants University Hospital that was backed by St James's. St Vincent's University Hospital declined to participate. The group also received, but chose to exclude, a number of unsolicited site offers that were not linked to a Dublin teaching hospital. The government chose the St James's site in November 2012.

A competition to design the project was won by UK firm Building Design Partnership and Irish firm O'Connell Mahon Architects in July 2014. Planning consent was granted in April 2016.

Construction on the first phase of the project, by BAM Contractors, began in 2016.

The name "Phoenix Children's Hospital Ireland" was selected for the hospital in 2017 (based on the mythological symbolism of the phoenix and the nearby Phoenix Park), but was abandoned in 2018 due to legal threats from the Phoenix Children's Hospital in Arizona, United States. The name was also judged to be inappropriate by the medical boards of the three existing Dublin children's hospitals, due to the potential for confusion at international meetings, as well as concerns that the name would be an insensitive reminder of historical scandals involving the incineration of organ specimens taken from deceased child patients.

On 1 August 2018, a sub-committee of the responsible board raised concerns over cost overruns for the project and its affordability. By December 2018, this had become a more public issue. By February 2019, the estimated project cost had increased from €650 million to at least €1.7 billion. In January 2019, the Oireachtas began to speak of hearings into the cost overruns. Later in the month, the Public Accounts Committee was informed that the final cost could be over €2 billion. On 19 February 2019, Minister for Health Simon Harris claimed that the only scandal in relation to the project would have been to cancel it. As of February 2019, an independent review of the procurement process was being carried out by auditors PriceWaterhouseCoopers.

Construction was halted on 31 March 2020 due to COVID-19 pandemic restrictions. While restrictions on construction were lifted in May, as of July 2020 work had not yet restarted due to disputes between the prime contractor and hospital board about the costs of the work stoppage.

In November 2022, Taoiseach Micheál Martin planted the first tree in the hospital's garden, and announced that, with the completion of the façade, the hospital was 80% completed.

The Chief Officer of the NPHDB, David Gunning, reported in July 2023 to the Oireachtas Committee on Health that the costs of merely building the hospital, excluding the costs of commissioning it for use, were now expected to approach €2.2 billion due to further overruns. Only 27 of the 3,000 rooms had been completed, and the expected building completion date had been revised to May 2024. By October 2023, that date had been revised again to late October 2024, and it was emphasised that the last date of the building phase would be the first date of an "operational commissioning phase", so the hospital would not actually open before April 2025. The government confirmed in February 2024 that the total sanctioned budget had now reached €2.24 billion, and that this would now be the "maximum allocation", with no further funding to be put towards the project. By May 2024, the date for "substantial completion" of building had been revised to February 2025, with a further six months before becoming operational. By October 2024, the completion date had again been revised to June 2025. By May 2025, it had slipped further to at least September of that year, with the Irish Times reporting that the subsequent commissioning phase may have to be postponed, due to the risks of undertaking it during the busy winter period. The health minister, Jennifer Carroll MacNeill, stated in August 2025 that less than 15 percent of the overall number of rooms were finished to a satisfactory level. In December 2025, Carroll MacNeill expressed hope that the hospital would open to patients by Christmas 2026.

== Design ==
The new hospital is planned to be seven storeys high. Including the underground car park with 1,000 spaces there is due to be about 160,000 m2 of accommodation with 6,150 rooms. The plans include 380 individual inpatient rooms, about the same number as Great Ormond Street Hospital, each with en-suite facilities and a bed for a parent or carer to sleep on. Twenty child and adolescent mental health beds are also proposed, to cater for patients with eating disorders and acute mental health problems, 93 day beds and 22 operating theatres, some with specialised facilities and a hospital school. Ronald McDonald House Charities is funding a separate building for families with 50 bedrooms.
