= Anna Gaynor =

Personal life
- Born: 17 March 1826 Athlone, County Westmeath, Ireland
- Died: 5 March 1899 (aged 72)

Religious life
- Religion: Christian
- Order: Religious Sisters of Charity

Anna Gaynor or Mother Mary John (17 March 1826 – 5 March 1899) was an Irish Religious Sister of Charity and first superior of Our Lady's Hospice, Harold's Cross, Dublin.

== Early life and family ==
Anna Gaynor was born in Athlone on 17 March 1826. Her parents were John and Anne Gaynor of Roxborough, County Roscommon. She had four sisters and one brother. One sister, Sarah, was a famous writer, and wrote a biography of the founder of the Religious Sisters of Charity, Mary Aikenhead. The family moved in Dublin when Gaynor was 12 years old, and she completed her education in Germany. Returning to Dublin she took part in the social life of Dublin with a circle of cultured and literary friends. Gaynor followed her parents' example, visiting and caring for the poor. As a teenager she felt the call to enter into a religious life, but she was reluctant to leave her family and friends. In November 1854 she became a novice in the Religious Sisters of Charity convent in Harold's Cross, professing in May 1857 as Sister Mary John. Her sister, Marcella, also joined this order.

== Career ==
Gaynor's first assignment was to St Vincent's Hospital, working as the secretary to the sister superior and as guest mistress to all visitors to the hospital. She remained in this post for 19 years. When the superior of the hospital, Mother Scholastica Margison, left to become head superior in Harold's Cross in 1876, Gaynor moved with her as her secretary. In 1878 she was given the task of helping her sister Sarah to gather information on Mother Mary Aikenhead for the biography Sarah was writing. It was published in 1879 and was well received. In September 1879, the noviciate, along with the head superior was moved from Harold's Cross to Milltown.

The vacant building at Harold's Cross was to become a hospice for the dying, with Gaynor appointed to oversee its establishment. Some of the first patients admitted were suffering with tuberculosis, with a staff that included a governess, a shoemaker, two servants and an older woman with the title of "roomkeeper". The opening ceremony was on 9 December 1879, with the Freeman's Journal reporting "Yesterday Our Lady's Hospice for the Dying, recently established under the care of the Sisters of Charity, Harold's Cross, was solemnly opened. . . It is truly a work of the noblest charity. . . Amid the thousand forms of tender mercy to which these good sisters devote themselves, there is none higher or more noble than this."

Gaynor filled every available bed with poor patients, with more accommodation soon needed. To meet this need, large scale fund raising was required. Gaynor wrote reports detailing the needs of the Hospice, its expenses, bequests, donation, and surplus funding. She maintained a high standard of diet for the hospice patients, along with comfort and consolation. She oversaw expansions and improvements to the Hospice's facilities.

== Death and legacy ==
Gaynor died on 5 March 1899 after a year's illness. She is buried in the convent cemetery in Donnybrook, Dublin. The Extended Care Unit at Our Lady's Hospice is named Anna Gaynor House.
