= Cloverhill Bakery =

American baked goods producer

Cloverhill Bakery was a producer of baked goods primarily sold through vending machines and retail throughout North America.

== History ==
Cloverhill was founded by William Gee II in Chicago, Illinois, in 1961 as a small family owned vending company that hand-packed pastries. The two sons, William E. Gee III & Edward Gee, took over the business and phased out of the vending business to focus solely on the bakery to provide pastries to the vending machine customers.

In 1977 Cloverhill Pastry Vend Corporation, expanded the bakery's facilities on 2020 North Parkside, Chicago, IL and implemented an automated Danish baking system. With the new Rheon dough lamination line, Cloverhill was able to bake high quality croissants for Burger Kings croissan'wich and eventually baked cinnamon rolls and pastries for Burger King too. Cloverhill also produced doughnuts for 7-Eleven.

Cloverhill used dry ice in the dough process and used a dry ice crusher and dry ice purchased from Continental Carbonics Products, Inc. until May 4, 1984, when it was discovered, after having received complaints from customers concerning its baked goods, that the machine was causing small chips or flakes of metal to be dispersed through the dough. This resulted in Cloverhill filing for bankruptcy; however, the Gee family persevered when William E Gee III two sons, William Gee IV & Robert J. Gee joined the company. They nurtured dedicated employees and brought in a key player to help turn the company around and thus cloverhill emerged from bankruptcy and continued to provide high quality danish products to their loyal customers.

In the spring of 1994, Cloverhill broke ground for the new state of the art temperature controlled 60,000 sq. ft manufacturing plant on the former site of the joseph lumber company on 2035 North Narragansett Avenue, Chicago, Illinois. The New production facility was completely ammonia cooled(No freon). boasted the largest custom Pulver-Genau baking oven(supplied by the late George Dunbar of Dunbar Systems), which resulted in the fastest danish pastry line in the world, producing 504 cinnamon rolls a minute.

In 2011, Cloverhill opened an additional facility in Cicero, Illinois. Cloverhill was acquired by Aryzta in 2014.

In 2017, an ICE immigration raid on its Chicago facility resulted in the removal of 800 workers who were found to be hired and employed without legal documentation.

On February 1, 2018, Aryzta announced that it had sold the Big Texas and Cloverhill brands to Hostess Brands.

== Product lines ==
Their products include Danish pastries, cinnamon rolls, crumb cakes, cake doughnuts and honey buns each wrapped for individual sale. Cloverhill Bakery baked goods are also sold through supermarkets, warehouse clubs and convenience stores.

Cloverhill Bakery is perhaps best known for their production of the Big Texas Cinnamon Roll. The Big Texas is the 2005, 2006, 2007, 2008 and 2009 Automatic Merchandiser Readers' Choice Pastry of the Year.

In 2011, Cloverhill Bakery introduced their Boston Crème Danish, in the New Products category of "Pastry".
