= Fornetti =

Hungarian bakery chain

Fornetti Kft.
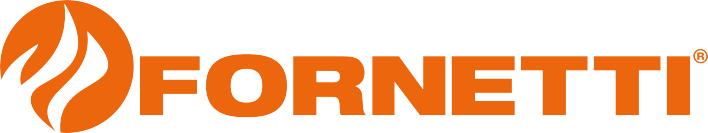
- Industry: Bakery; Frozen Food
- Founded: 1 March 1997, Kecskemét, Hungary
- Founder: József Palásti
- Headquarters: Kecskemét, Hungary
- Number of locations: ~5,000 retail outlets
- Key people: Nándor Szabó (Managing Director); Zoltán Kovács (Head of Finance); Szilárd Kelemen (Head of Sales); Ádám Chiovini (Operations Director)
- Parent: Aryzta AG
- Website: www.fornetti.com

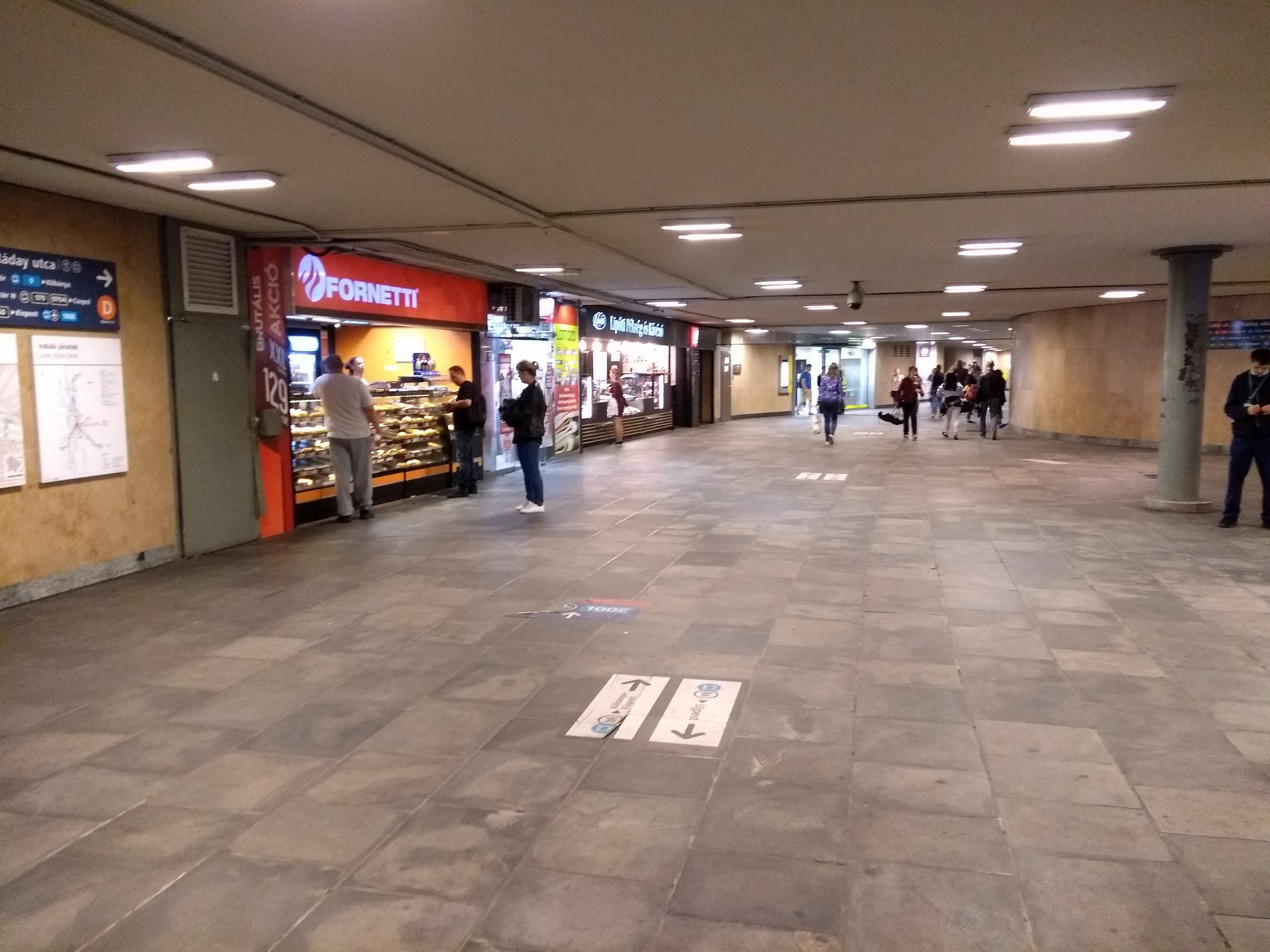
A Fornetti location under Kálvin tér in Budapest

Fornetti Kft. is a Hungarian-origin frozen bakery company founded in Kecskemét, Hungary, in March 1997 by master baker József Palásti. It began with a small-scale production of frozen mini‑bakery items sold by weight and expanded via a franchise network featuring mobile "spot ovens" enabling easy on‑site baking. Since August 2015, Fornetti has been part of the Aryzta AG global bakery group, following Aryzta's acquisition of the Fornetti Group.

The company is headquartered in Kecskemét, Hungary, and has production facilities in Kecskemét and Kiskunfélegyháza, Hungary, Timișoara, Romania, and Ihtiman, Bulgaria.

== Operations ==
Fornetti produces over 200 varieties of frozen or par‑baked bakery products, ranging from sweet pastries and savory rolls to daily bakery items, distributed across 17 European countries. Its products are consumed by nearly one million people daily across its franchise network of more than 5,000 retail points as well as through non‑branded retail channels.

== Franchise model ==
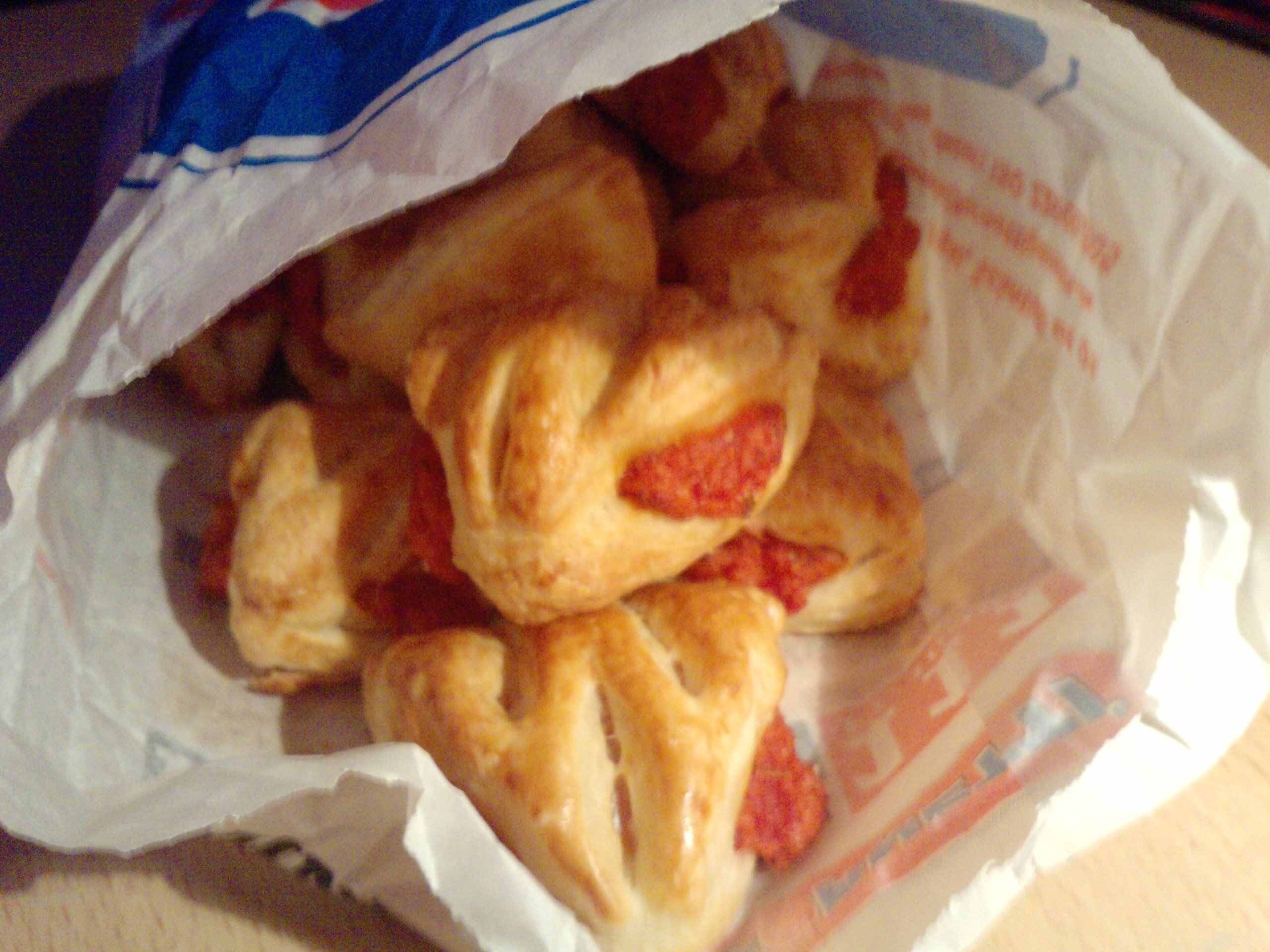
Pizza-flavored Fornetti

Fornetti operates a low‑investment franchise system. Franchisees receive frozen products and install compact "spot ovens" in small retail spaces (typically 15–30 m²), which allow them to bake and sell on demand without prior experience. The company supports partners with training, branding, logistics, marketing, and operational knowledge.

== Quality standards ==
Fornetti emphasizes food safety and quality, adhering to IFS and FSSC 22000 certifications, and was the first Hungarian bakery company to replace traditional margarine with low-trans-fat alternatives without raising prices. It also uses non‑GMO ingredients and continuously adjusts recipes to improve nutritional profiles.
