= Aryzta =

Swiss food company

ARYZTA AG
- Type: Aktiengesellschaft
- Traded as: SIX: ARYN
- ISIN: CH0043238366
- Industry: Food
- Founded: 1897
- Headquarters: Zürich, Switzerland
- Key people: Urs Jordi, (Chairman and Interim CEO)
- Products: Bakery products
- Revenue: €3,797 million (2017)
- Operating income: –€808 million (2017)
- Net income: –€906 million (2017)
- Website: www.aryzta.com

ARYZTA AG /æˈrɪztə/ is a food business based in Zürich, Switzerland. It operates in Europe, Asia, Australia and New Zealand. It is incorporated in Switzerland and is listed on the SIX Swiss Exchange (the Zürich Stock Exchange). It discontinued its listing on Euronext Dublin on 1 March 2021. The group is a major supplier in the specialty frozen bakery sector, and is a global supplier of baked goods to the food service, retail and quick service restaurant sectors.

== History ==
Logo of the former IAWS Group

The company was founded as the Irish Co-Operative Agricultural Agency Society in January 1897 and renamed the Irish Agricultural Wholesale Society ('IAWS') in December 1897. It was first listed on the Irish Stock Exchange in 1988 and for most of the 1990s the company was managed by Philip Lynch, first as chief executive officer and later chairman. It bought Shamrock Foods in 1989, R&H Hall in 1990 and Cuisine de France in 1997.

The company went on to buy Delice de France in 1999 and La Brea Bakery in 2001.

In 2003, Owen Killian who joined IAWS in 1976 took over as CEO of IAWS Plc, replacing Philip Lynch.

In June 2007, Aryzta spun off its agribusiness activities as Origin Enterprises plc.

The company merged with Hiestand Holding AG in August 2008 and, having changed its name to ARYZTA, commenced trading on the SIX Swiss Exchange and the Irish Stock Exchange on 22 August 2008. The new name derived from Latin arista, which referred to the apex or awn of a wheat grain.

Aryzta bought Honeytop Speciality Foods in September 2011, Klemme AG, a German manufacturer of frozen bakery products, for €280 million, in 2013, and Pineridge Bakery in Canada and Cloverhill Bakery in the US for €730 million in 2014. It also acquired the Hungary-based Fornetti group, which has operations in central and eastern European markets, in 2015.

In October 2016, it was confirmed that Gary McGann would join Aryzta as chairman. In February 2017, Owen Killian, announced his resignation as CEO of the company.

In February 2018, Aryzta announced that it had sold the Big Texas and Cloverhill brands to Hostess Brands, and, in March 2018, the company sold its shareholding in Signature Flat Breads back to the Eid family.

In May 2018, Aryzta approved a three-year restructuring plan aimed at delivering €200 million in cost savings over three years.

In November 2019, the company sold its British specialist bakery business, Delice de France, to its management for an undisclosed sum, and, in October 2019, Aryzta reduced its stake in the French frozen food company Picard Surgelés, selling 43% of its stake to Groupe Zouari for €156 million.

In November 2019, The Phoenix reported that "since the appointment of Gary McGann as chairman of Aryzta in December 2016, the share price has fallen from €40 to its current €1.20, a drop of 97%. This is one of the single worst episodes of equity destruction of any Irish company". In January 2020, hedge fund Veraison attempted to unseat Aryzta's board of directors. In August 2020, Aryzta announced that the departure of group CFO, Fredric Pflanz, would follow the resignation of two other board members, Dan Flinter and Rolf Watter. At a special Extraordinary General Meeting, in September 2020, activist investors took control of Aryzta, ousting the board. In 2021, London-based Lodbrok Capital LLP's European Credit Opportunities Fund helped Aryzta stop a take-over bid from Elliott Management Corp.

In 2021, the company sold off its Brazilian businesses (Aryzta do Brasil) to Grupo Bimbo, and sold off its North American holdings to private equity firm Lindsay Goldberg for $850 million.

In 2022, Aryzta more than doubled its bakery capacity in Malaysia through the acquisition of the bakery, equipment and associated land of De-Luxe Food Services from Envictus International Holdings. and, in March 2023, Aryzta announced that it had doubled its production capacity for sourdough and speciality breads in the UK and Ireland with an investment in the Grange Castle bakery in Dublin.

== Operations ==
ARYZTA is known for its Delice de France range of French-style bread-based products and its higher end of Artisan Breads available from La Brea Bakery. Other brands include Shamrock Foods, Cuisine de France and Hubert. Aryzta is particularly known for providing McDonald's burger buns. Aryzta operates 53 bakeries & kitchens across Europe, North America, South America, Asia, Australia and New Zealand. Aryzta refers to itself as one of the largest frozen bakery companies in the world.
