= Our Lady's Hospice =

Coordinates: 53.3271°N 6.2807°W

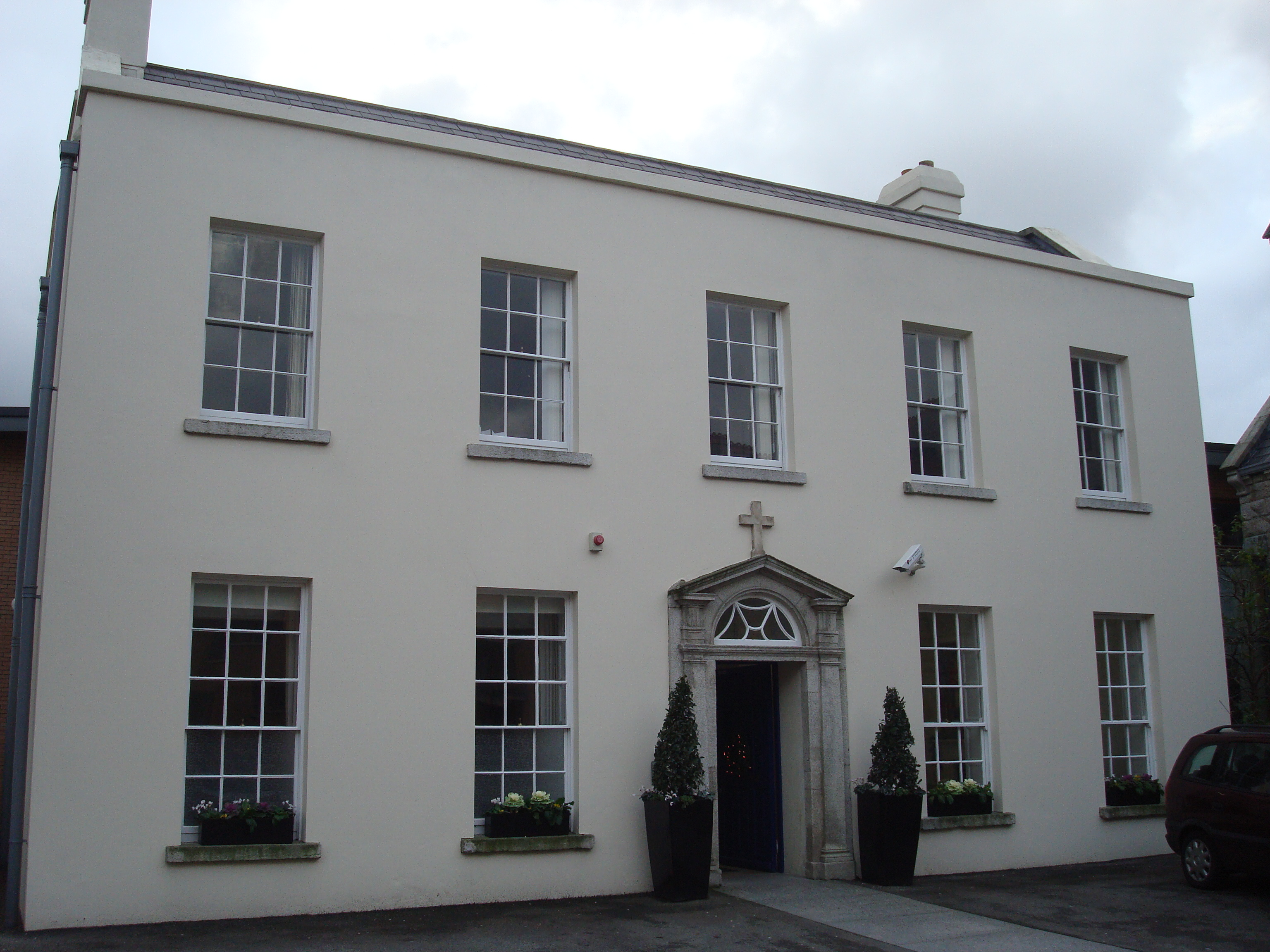
Our Lady's Hospice Blackrock

Our Lady's Hospice & Care Services is a hospice and health care provider with three locations: one at Harold's Cross, Dublin and satellite facilities at Blackrock, County Dublin and Magheramore, County Wicklow in Ireland. It provides specialist care for people with a range of needs from rehabilitation to end-of-life care.

== History ==
When the motherhouse of the Religious Sisters of Charity moved from "Our Lady's Mount" in Harold's Cross to Mount St. Anne's in Milltown in 1879, the sisters opened Our Lady's Hospice at Harold's Cross, pioneering the modern hospice movement. The congregation was founded by Mary Aikenhead in 1815. By 1880, Our Lady's Hospice had a capacity of forty beds, and was overseen, expanded and improved by the first sister superior of the Hospice, Anna Gaynor. Later, Catherine Cummins, or Mother Polycarp, oversaw further expansion of the accommodation.

Around the time the hospice was founded in 1879, the incidence of TB, typhoid, and measles in Dublin was very high. By 1889, it was claimed that Dublin's death rate was topped only by Calcutta. Dublin's high mortality rates at the time were attributable in part to very sick rural people moving to Dublin in search of care, and thus contributing to Dublin's mortality rate. Research by Thomas Wrigley Grimsham in the early 1880s showed that the incidence of TB in Ireland was rising compared to the rest of the UK, where it was falling. He was able to show that from the 1860s to the 1880s, there was a steady increase in the number of deaths from TB, and it was also more prevalent in urban areas.
