= John Thomas Gilbert =

Irish antiquarian and historian

Sir John Gilbert

Sir John Thomas Gilbert, LLD, FSA, RIA (23 January 1829 – 23 May 1898) was an Irish archivist, antiquarian and historian.

== Early life and education ==
John Thomas Gilbert was born on 23 January 1829, the second son of John Gilbert, an English Protestant, who was Portuguese consul in Dublin, and Marianne Gilbert, an Irish Catholic, daughter of Henry Costello. He was born in Jervis Street, Dublin. His early days were spent at Brannockstown, County Meath.

He was educated at Bective College, Dublin, and at Prior Park College near Bath, England. He received no university training, as his mother was unwilling for him to attend the Anglican Trinity College, Dublin, which was at that time the only university in Dublin.

In 1846, his family moved to Blackrock, a Dublin suburb, where he resided until his death.

== Career ==
At age 19, he was elected to the Council of the Celtic Society, and thus became associated with some of the famous writers and orators of the age: Butt, Ferguson, Mitchel, and Smith O'Brien. His essay, Historical Literature of Ireland, appeared in 1851, and four years later he became a Member of the Royal Irish Academy, and secretary of the Irish Celtic and Archaeological Society, whose members included O'Donovan, O'Curry, Graves, Todd, and Wilde.

Gilbert held a number of important posts in historical and antiquarian societies, including serving as librarian of the Royal Irish Academy for 34 years. He established the Todd lectureship in Celtic.

Gilbert's works in Celtic studies included photographic reproductions of ancient Irish manuscripts and editions of Leabhar na h-Uidhre and Leabhar Breac.

== Personal life ==
In 1891 Gilbert married the Irish novelist Rosa Mulholland.

== Honours ==
In 1862, Gilbert was awarded the Royal Irish Academy's Cunningham Medal.

Gilbert received the honorary degree of LL.D. from the Royal University in 1892, and five years later was knighted for his services to archaeology and history.

== Death and legacy ==
Gilbert died on 23 May 1898.

The Gilbert Library, in Dublin's Pearse Street, is named after him.

== Works ==
- History of the City of Dublin (1854-9), in three volumes.
- History and Treatment of the Public Records of Ireland (1863) which caused considerable sensation, arguing to the government the futility of entrusting the publication of Irish State documents to men unskilled in the Irish language.
- History of the Viceroys of Ireland (1865)
- Calendar of the Ancient Records of Dublin (7 vols., 1889–98)
- History of the Irish Confederation and the War in Ireland, 1641-9 (7 vols., 1882–91)
- Jacobite Narrative of the War in Ireland, 1688-91 (1892).
