= Rosa Mulholland =

Irish writer (1841–1921)

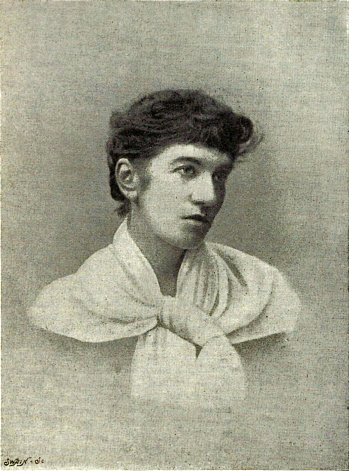
- Rosa Mulholland, Irish novelist, poet and playwright
- Born: 19 March 1841; Belfast
- Died: 21 April 1921 (aged 80); Dublin, Ireland
- Resting place: Glasnevin Cemetery, Dublin, Ireland
- Occupations: Novelist, poet, playwright
- Spouse: Sir John Gilbert
- Relatives: Clara Mulholland (sister)
- Writing career
- Pen name: Lady Gilbert
- Notable work: Dunmara

Signature
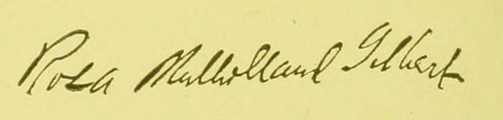

Rosa Mulholland, Lady Gilbert (19 March 1841 – 21 April 1921) was an Irish novelist, poet and playwright.

== Life ==
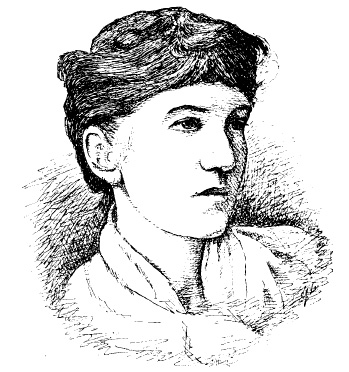
Rosa Mulholland.

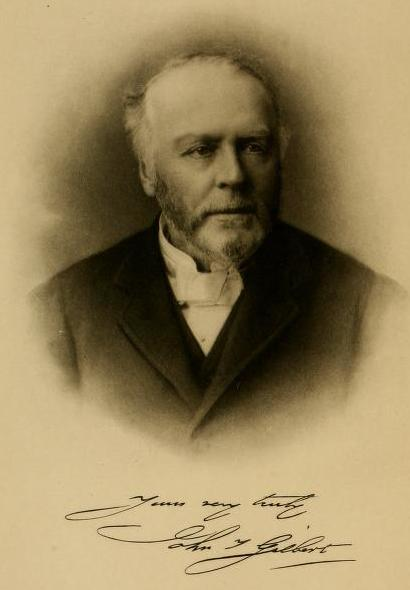
Sir John Thomas Gilbert (1829–1898), an Irish archivist, antiquarian and historian by Rosa Mulholland Gilbert (1841–1921) published in 1905 in London and New York: Longmans

She was born in Belfast, the daughter of Dr. Joseph Stevenson Mulholland of Newry. Originally, Mulholland wished to become a painter, but turned to literary pursuits in her early life. Beginning her literary career at a very young age, Mulholland attempted to publish her first book at age 15. She submitted several comical illustrations to the literary journal Punch, but they were ultimately rejected. She received much help and encouragement from Charles Dickens, who highly valued her work and persuaded her to continue writing.

Having spent some years in a remote mountainous region in the west of Ireland, Mulholland seemingly became intrigued by the scenery and company, inspirations which greatly contributed towards the development of her literary longings and talents.

Dependent on the professions of the men in her life, Mullholland's social position was an elevated one. Her father was a Belfast doctor, he had two medical practices in Belfast and died in 1855 Her husband, Sir John Gilbert, was a renowned Dublin historian, and her eldest sister was Lady Russell, married to Lord Russell of Killowen, Lord Chief Justice of England.

She was also a devout Catholic and a prominent member of a literacy circle. Among her female friends with whom she shared many interests were Sarah Atkinson and Charlotte O'Conor Eccles.

On 29 May 1891, Mulholland married John Thomas Gilbert at St. Mary's Pro Cathedral in Dublin, giving her residence in the parish registry as 48 Upper Gardner St. In the biography she later wrote of him, she describes their marriage as having "brought joy to the crowning years of his unselfish and laborious life."

Her husband was a Dublin antiquary and historian, who authored History of the City of Dublin, as well as serving as the editor of several important standard works, including the history of the Irish Confederation of Lished by command of Queen Victoria. Upon his knighthood in 1897, Rosa assumed the title of Lady Gilbert.

Mulholland and her husband lived at Villa Nova, Blackrock, Dublin, although she was an established professional in Dublin long before her marriage in 1891. Her brother, Mr. William Mulholland, Q.C., was a well-known member of the English bar.

Her contributions to All the Year Round saw more success, due to encouragement from the late Charles Dickens. He even went so far as to suggest that her two novels, Hester's History (1869) and The Wicked Woods of Tobereevil (1872) be written for his periodical, then edited by himself. Other stories were also approved by Dickens, including two shorter stories, The Late Miss Hollingford (1886) and Eldergowan (1874), which Dickens also republished.

Rosa first got into writing in the form of poems. She was seen to be very successful in this writing when her poem "Irene" got accepted by the Cornhill Magazine. The poems were accepted known under the title of Vagrant Verses. Overall, the poems were very well received by the critics and the public. She also wrote a poem called Dreams and Realities (London & Edinburgh: Sands 1916, p. viii.)

Besides occasionally serving as an editor of a volume of short stories, Mulholland produced a great number of novels and wrote a biography of her husband in 1905, who had died abruptly in 1898. She goes on to write twenty four books after the death of her husband

According to his wife, after a pleasant morning spent by the couple in their Villa Nova garden, Sir Gilbert had left alone to attend a meeting of the Council of the Royal Irish Academy, though she had offered to attend him, and died of sudden heart failure en route.

Rosa Mulholland, Lady Gilbert, died in Dublin, Ireland on 21 April 1921, and is buried in Glasnevin Cemetery. She left £173.07 to one "Charles Russell gentleman", presumably the son of her sister, Lady Russell.

== Memorable works ==
Though Mulholland wrote many novels that touch upon and investigate the general theme of females yearning to pursue artistic activities in a professional setting, her conclusions never defy accepted gender limits for women in the Victorian era.

The first novel that Mulholland wrote was Dunmara (1864), written under the pen name, "Ruth Murray". This story of an Irish girl raised in Spain who makes her way in London, England as an artist combined Mulholland's interest in female occupational pursuits with her love of art. The heroine's situation and aspirations could also be seen to mirror Mulholland's own, depicting a society in which careers are potentially available for young women. However, despite addressing fraught topics such as female autonomy and public careers, Mulholland was careful to backtrack towards the end of the novel, concluding by presenting her heroines as "good wives." Mulholland's writing also studied the relationship between gender and economics. She noticed how women struggled for happiness in a world where erotic love and marriage were tied to issues of material security.

One of Mulholland's later works, Marcella Gray (1886), was first serialized in The Irish Monthly (1885), and offered the example of a beneficent Catholic landowner as a solution to the Irish Question. In this novel a poor Catholic girl from Dublin who sympathizes with the Irish commoners inherits a west of Ireland estate and, advised by her priest Fr. Daly, manages it with kindness towards her tenants, not greed and cruelty.

Rose also wrote a twenty-two stanza poem "Irene" (1862) which was accepted by The Cornhill Magazine. She did not publish under her name, however, but used the pseudonym "Ruth Murray". The illustrations were done by the famous painter Sir John Everett Millais. Many of her novels were featured in the Irish Monthly. She wrote many novels that follow the general theme of female yearning for activities, yet never surpass accepted gender limits for women in the Victorian era; Mulholland generally concludes her texts with a happy, socially appropriate ending.

In her final years, she consistently wrote fiction with independent, strong-willed women as heroines, and her later work was mostly directed at young readers. Belfast Central Public Library holds Banshee Castle (1895); Dreams and Realities (1916); Spirit and Dust (1908); Vagrant Verses (1886); The Walking Trees and other tales (1897); Wild Birds of Killeevy (n.d.); MORRIS holds Life of Sir John Gilbert (1905).

== List of notable works ==
Several of Rosa Mulholland's works including Four Little Mischiefs (1883), The Little Flower Seekers (188-?), and Puck and Blossom: A Fairy Tale (1879?) are available in digital form through the Nineteenth Century Collections Online database, as well as the serial of Dublin Castle published in the periodical Woman's World.

As Author:

- [as “Ruth Murray”,] Dunmara (Smith Elder 1864), rep. as Story of Ellen (1907) [infra]
- [anon.,] Hester's History, 2 vols. (London: Chapman & Hall 1869)
- The Wicked Woods of Toobereevil, 2 vols. (London: Burnes & Oates 1872); [another edn.] (London: Burns & Oates [1897]), and [new edn.] (1909)
- Eldergowan, or Twelve Months of My Life, and Other Tales (London 1874)
- Five Little Farmers (London 1876)
- Four Little Mischiefs (London: Blackie 1883) and another edition ([1925])
- The Wild Birds of Killeevy (London: Burns & Oates [1883])
- Hetty Gray, or Nobody's Bairn (London: Blackie 1883) [var. 1884]
- The Walking Trees and Other Tales (Dublin: Gill 1885)
- The Late Miss Hollingford (London: Blackie [1886]), another ed., [Seaside Library No.921] (NY: G. Munro 1887)
- Marcella Grace, an Irish Novel (London: Kegan Paul 1886), another ed. (London: E. Mathews [1899])
- A Fair Emigrant (London: Kegan Paul 1888) [IF err. 1889]
- Giannetta: A Girl's Story of Herself (London: Blackie 1889), another ed. (1901; reiss. 1925)
- The Haunted Organist of Hurly Burly and Other Stories [The Idle Hours Series] [1891]
- The Mystery of Hall-in-the-Wood (London: Sunday School Union [1893])
- Marigold and Other Stories (Dublin: Eason 1894), and [another edn.] as The Marigold Series of Tales (Dublin: Catholic Truth Society [?1911)]
- Banshee Castle (London: Blackie 1895), and [another edn.] as The Girls of Banshee Castle (London: Blackie & Son [1925]) [IF conject. 1894, new edn. (1902)]
- Nanno, a Daughter of the State (London: Grant Richards 1899)
- Onora (London: Grant Richards 1900), and [another edn.], as Norah of Waterford (London & Edinburgh: Sands 1915)
- Terry, or She Ought to Have Been a Boy (London: Blackie 1902), 119pp., ill. E. A. Cabitt [DIL conject. 1900]
- Cynthia's Bonnet Shop (London: Blackie 1900) ill G. Demain Hammond [DIL 1901]
- The Squire's Grand-Daughter[s] (London: Burns & Oates; NY: Benziger 1903)
- A Girl's Ideal : A Story of a Fortune (London: Blackie [1905] 1908)
- The Tragedy of Chris: The Story of a Dublin Flower-Girl (London & Edinburgh: Sands 1902), another edn. (1925)
- Life of Sir John Gilbert (London: Longman 1905)
- Our Boycotting, a Miniature Comedy (Dublin: Gill 1907)
- The Story of Ellen (London: Burns & Oates; NY: Benziger 1907), 434pp. [formerly issued as Dunmara, 1864]
- Our Sister Maisie (London: Blackie 1907), reiss. [1940])
- Cousin Sara - A Story of Arts and Crafts (London: Blackie 1908)
- The Return of Mary O’Murrough (Edinburgh & London: Sands 1908), and [reiss.] (1910; pop. edn. 1915)
- Spirit and Dust (London: Elkin Mathews 1908)
- Cousin Sara, a Story of Arts and Crafts (London: Blackie 1909)
- Father Tim (London & Edinburgh: Sands 1910)
- The O’Shaughnessy Girls (London: Blackie 1911), and [reiss.] ([1933])
- Fair Noreen, the Story of a Girl of Character (London: Blackie 1912), and [reiss.] ([1925, 1945]
- Twin Sisters, an Irish Tale (London: Blackie 1913)
- The Cranberry Claimants (London: Sands 1913)
- Old School Friends: A Tale of Modern Life (London: Blackie, 1914), and [reiss.] ([1925, 1940])
- The Daughter in Possession: The Story of a Great Temptation (London: Blackie 1915)
- Narcissa's Ring (London: Blackie 1916) [var. 1915], [reiss.] ([1926])
- O’Loughlin of Clare (London & Edinburgh: Sands 1916)
- Price and Saviour (Dublin: Gill n.d.)

As Editor:

- The Life and Adventures of Robinson Crusoe (1886)
- Fifty-Two Stories of Girl-Life at Home and Abroad [1894]
