= Hiestand Holding =

Bakery

- Company type: Joint Stock Corporation
- ISIN: CH0007186981
- Industry: Baked goods
- Founded: 1967
- Defunct: 2008
- Fate: Merger with IAWS Group
- Successor: Aryzta
- Revenue: 740,7 mil. CHF (2007)
- Number of employees: 3,197 (31. December 2007)

Hiestand Holding AG, based in Schlieren, was a listed Swiss large-scale bakery with a focus on convenience frozen baked goods ("ready to bake products") as well as sales concepts and services, which merged into the Aryzta Group in 2008. The Hiestand Group as a whole employed around 3,200 people and generated sales of 741 million Swiss francs in 2007. Aryzta in Switzerland continues to use the Hiestand brand for baked goods.

== History ==
At the age of 24, Alfred “Fredy” Hiestand set up his first bakery with second-hand dough machines in an unused laundromat. His starting capital was CHF 5,000.

In 1967, together with Albert Abderhalden, he laid the foundation for a convenience frozen baked goods group that, before its takeover in 2008, generated sales of 740.7 million Swiss francs with around 3,200 employees.

A year later, Hiestand developed the first croissant dough pieces as a semi-finished product for bakeries, which he sold to major customers. In 1988, the decisive factor was the pre-fermentation of the dough before freezing, so that it could be baked quickly and easily later on at the point of sale. After this successful development, he became known in Switzerland as the "Gipfeli-King".

In 2003 Alfred Hiestand sold his share and withdrew from the company. For a time, Albert Abderhalden ran the company.

Hiestand has also been represented in Germany since 1989 with the Hiestand and Suhr brands. In 2006, Hiestand took over the Fricopan company in Berlin-Neukölln with its branch in Immekath, Saxony-Anhalt. Hiestand had subsidiaries in Switzerland, Germany, Austria, Poland, Malaysia, Japan and Turkey.

In August 2008, the company merged with its largest shareholder, the Irish IAWS Group, to form Aryzta. The two companies continued to operate independently on the market under the same roof with their existing brands. Hiestand Holding shares were listed on the SWX Swiss Exchange until 20 August 2008.

== Literature ==
- Philipp Gut: Gipfelikönig Fredy Hiestand. Vom Bauernbub zum Grossbäcker und Gesundheitspionier. Stämpfli Verlag, Bern 2017, ISBN 978-3-7272-7918-8
