= Picard Surgelés =

French frozen food company

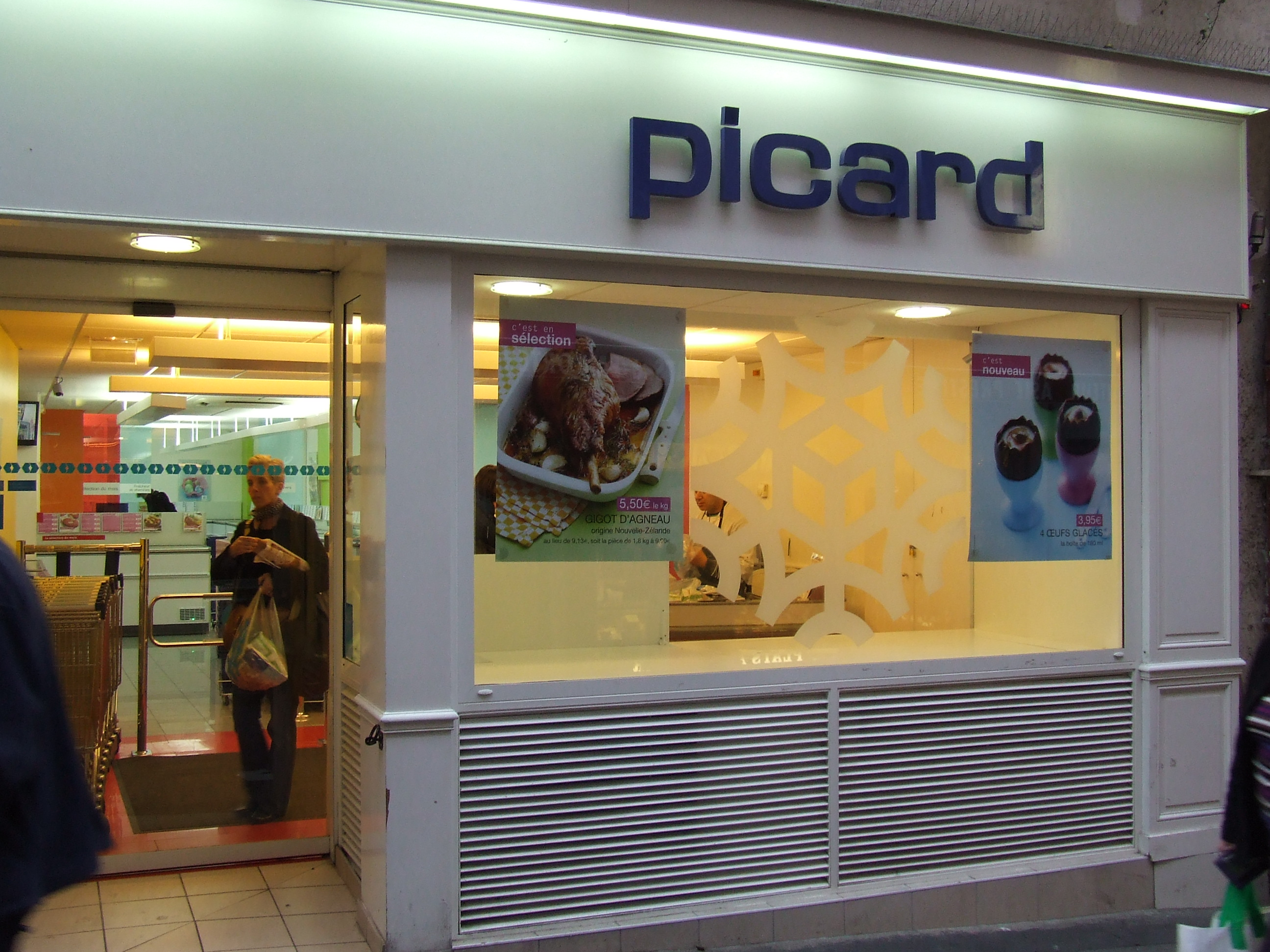
- A Picard shop in Paris
- Industry: Retail
- Founder: Raymond Picard
- Area served: France, Europe, Japan
- Key people: Cathy Collart Geiger (CEO)
- Products: Frozen food, frozen prepared food
- Revenue: €1,385 million (03/2017)
- Net income: €110 million (03/2017)
- Website: picard.fr

Picard Surgelés (French pronunciation: [pikaʁ syʁʒəle]) is a French food company specializing in the manufacture and retail distribution of frozen products. It began as Les Glacières de Fontainebleau in 1906. Picard Surgelés has almost 900 retail stores in France. In 2014, French consumers voted Picard as their favorite brand.

The company produces about 700 different products, which are sold exclusively under the Picard brand.

== History ==
Picard began as Les Glacières de Fontainebleau in 1906. Raymond Picard founded it as an ice-supply business, to provide households with blocks of ice prior to the advent of home refrigerators. Arnaud Decelle bought the business in 1974 and began to sell frozen vegetables from a store in Paris. Today, Picard is owned jointly by Aryzta (49%) and Lion Capital (51%), and commands about 20 percent of the French frozen food market.

In 2008, Xavier Decelle, the CEO and son of the company's 1973 acquirer, was ousted by the majority shareholder, BC Partners.

In October 2019, Aryzta's board agreed to an offer from the Tunisian investment company Groupe Zouari to divest 43% of its stake in Picard for a sum of €156 million, with Aryzta retaining a 4.5% stake in the business.

Cathy Collart Geiger replaced Philippe Pauze as Executive President in June 2020.

In October 2024, Groupe Zouari announced a purchase of Lion Capital's ownership in Picard. The sale will be finalized by the end of Q1 2025 and will make Groupe Zouari the sole owner of Picard.

== Retail operations ==
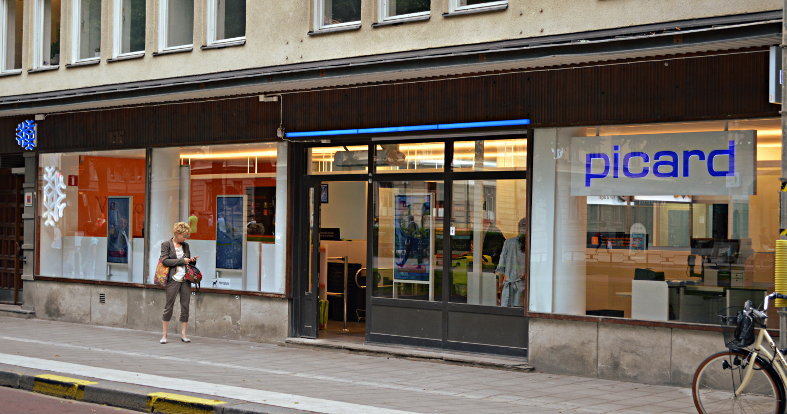
A Picard shop at Karlavägen in Stockholm, Sweden.

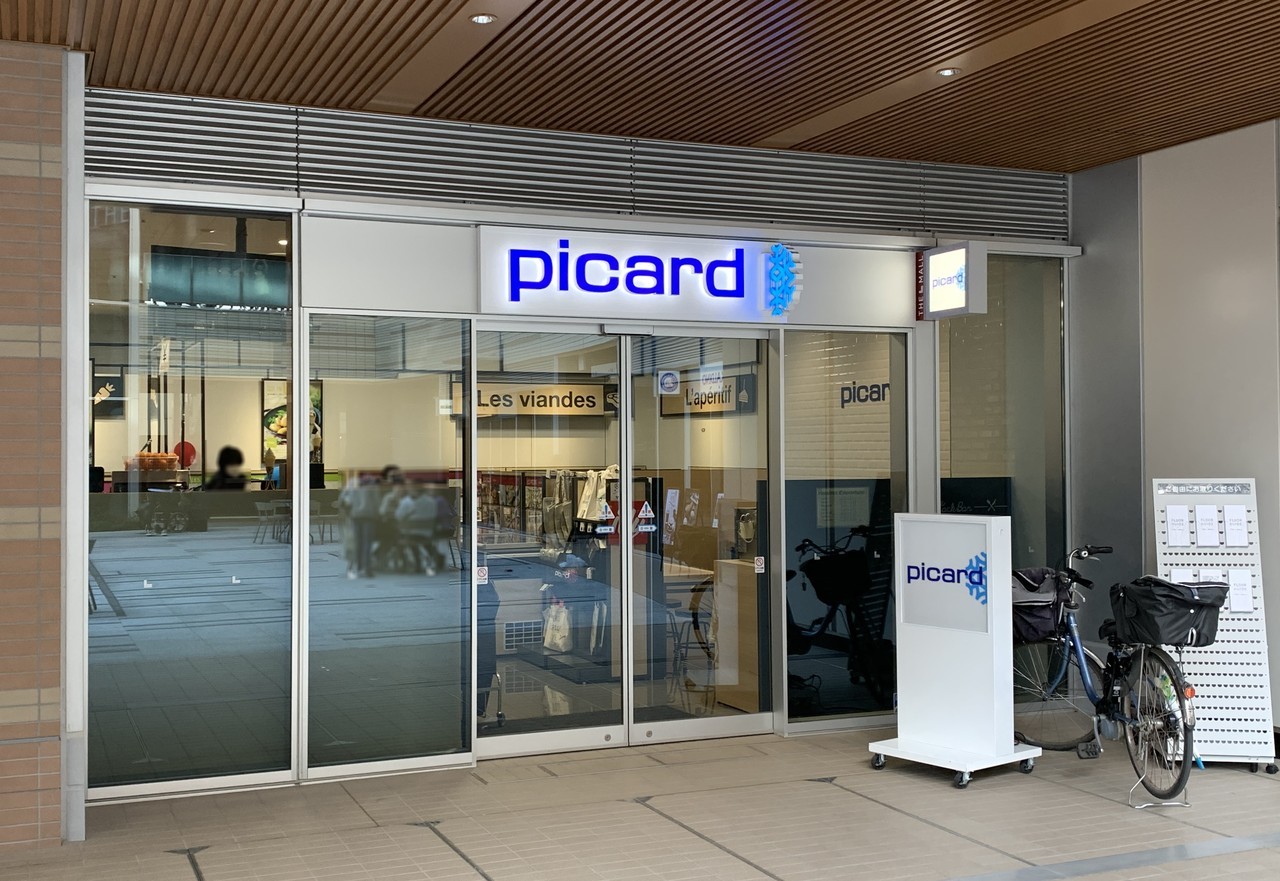
A Picard shop at Musashi-Koyama in Tokyo, Japan.

Although Picard retail stores offer some non-frozen food options, almost all of the products in each shop are frozen food. The average size of a Picard retail store is about 186 square metres (2,000 sq ft). The variety of the food is a major selling point, which beyond frozen fruit, vegetables, meat, and fish include options such as minced ginger, various chopped herbs, sauteed shallots, peeled chestnuts, wild mushrooms, pumpkin puree, and various sauces such as beurre blanc. Frozen prepared foods are also large sellers, including items like croissants, brioches, salads, galettes, hors d'oeuvres, entrees, and various desserts. In 2016, Picard's best-selling item was extra-fine green beans, of which they daily sold 16 tonnes (15.7 long tons; 17.6 short tons). Shoppers use insulated bags to carry products home.

Picard entered the Japan market in 2014 through a partnership with Aeon, initially by selling Picard products in Aeon supermarkets. The first dedicated Picard retail store in Japan opened in October 2016. In Japan, the brand is positioned as an upmarket food retailer, with stores in the most prestigious neighborhoods of Tokyo and prices on average 40% higher than in France.

== Supply chain and new products ==
Picard owns much of the production chain from the raw ingredients to the final products and enjoys a close relationship with farmers, and so chooses not to include many of the additives and preservatives that other frozen food retailers include. Picard introduces around 200 new food options every year to keep consumers happy.
