= National Children's Hospital =

Former hospital in Dublin, Ireland

- Health Service Executive
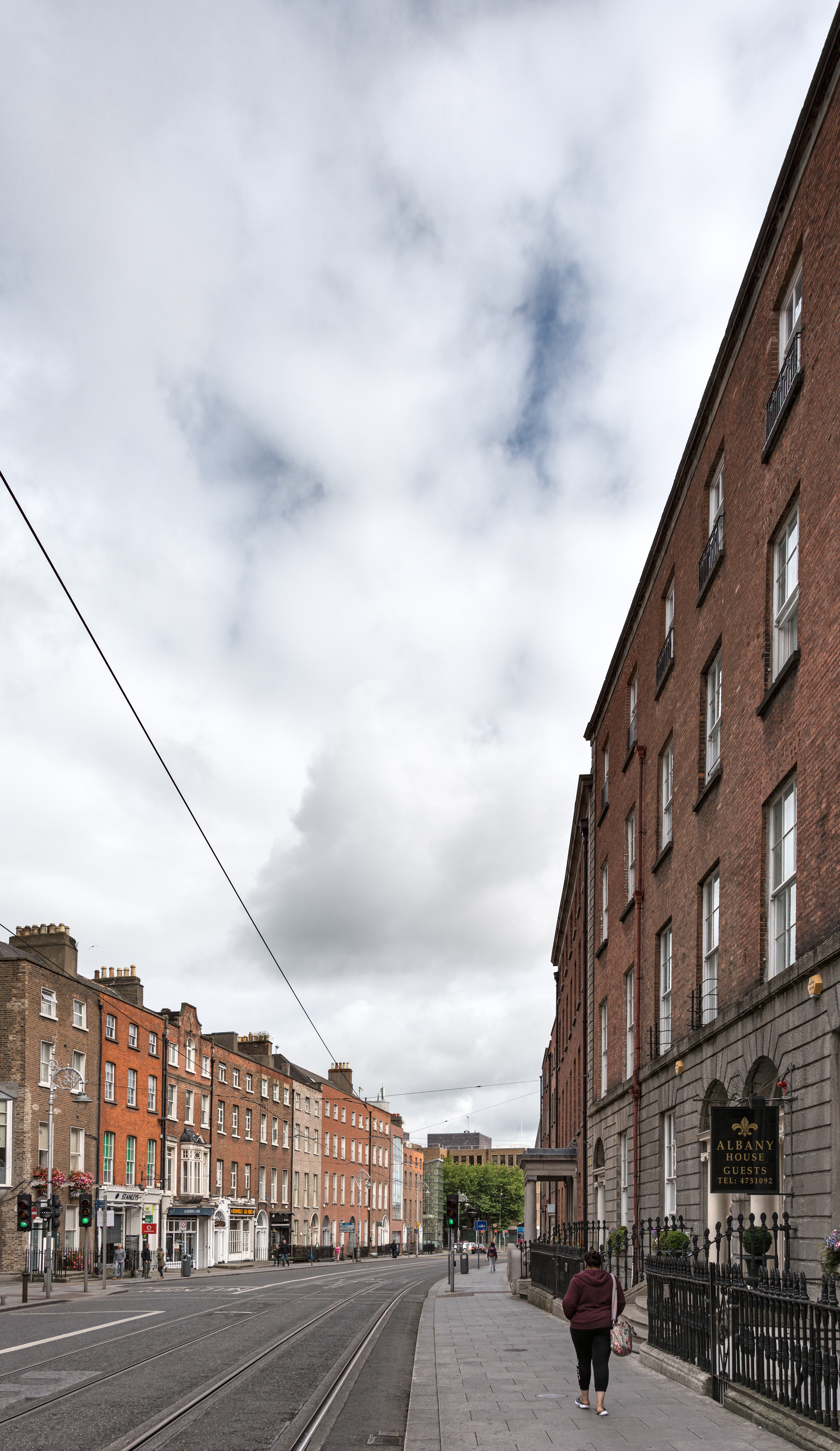
- 87-91 Harcourt Street (on the right with the portico), home of the National Children's Hospital from 1887 to 1998

- Shown in Dublin

Geography
- Location: Dublin City, County Dublin, Ireland
- Coordinates: 53.33650°N 6.26289°W

Organisation
- Care system: HSE
- Type: Specialist

Services
- Speciality: Children's Hospital

History
- Founded: 1821
- Closed: 1998

Links
- Website: www.tuh.ie/Children-s-Services/
- Lists: Hospitals in the Republic of Ireland

The National Children's Hospital (Irish: Ospidéal Náisiúnta na Leanaí) was a children's teaching hospital in Dublin, Ireland. It was absorbed into the Tallaght Hospital in June 1998.

== History ==
The hospital was founded by Sir Philip Crampton, Sir Henry Marsh and Dr Charles Johnston, on Pitt Street (now Balfe Street) in The Liberties as the Institute for Sick Children in 1821. Following amalgamation with the National Orthopaedic and Children's Hospital in 1884, the combined institution moved to Harcourt Street in 1887. It was absorbed into the Tallaght Hospital as its Children's Services Department in June 1998.

In November 2012 the Minister for Health James Reilly announced plans to transfer Children's Services from the Tallaght University Hospital to a new children's hospital on the campus of St. James's Hospital.
