= Connolly Hospital =

Hospital in Dublin, Ireland

- Health Service Executive
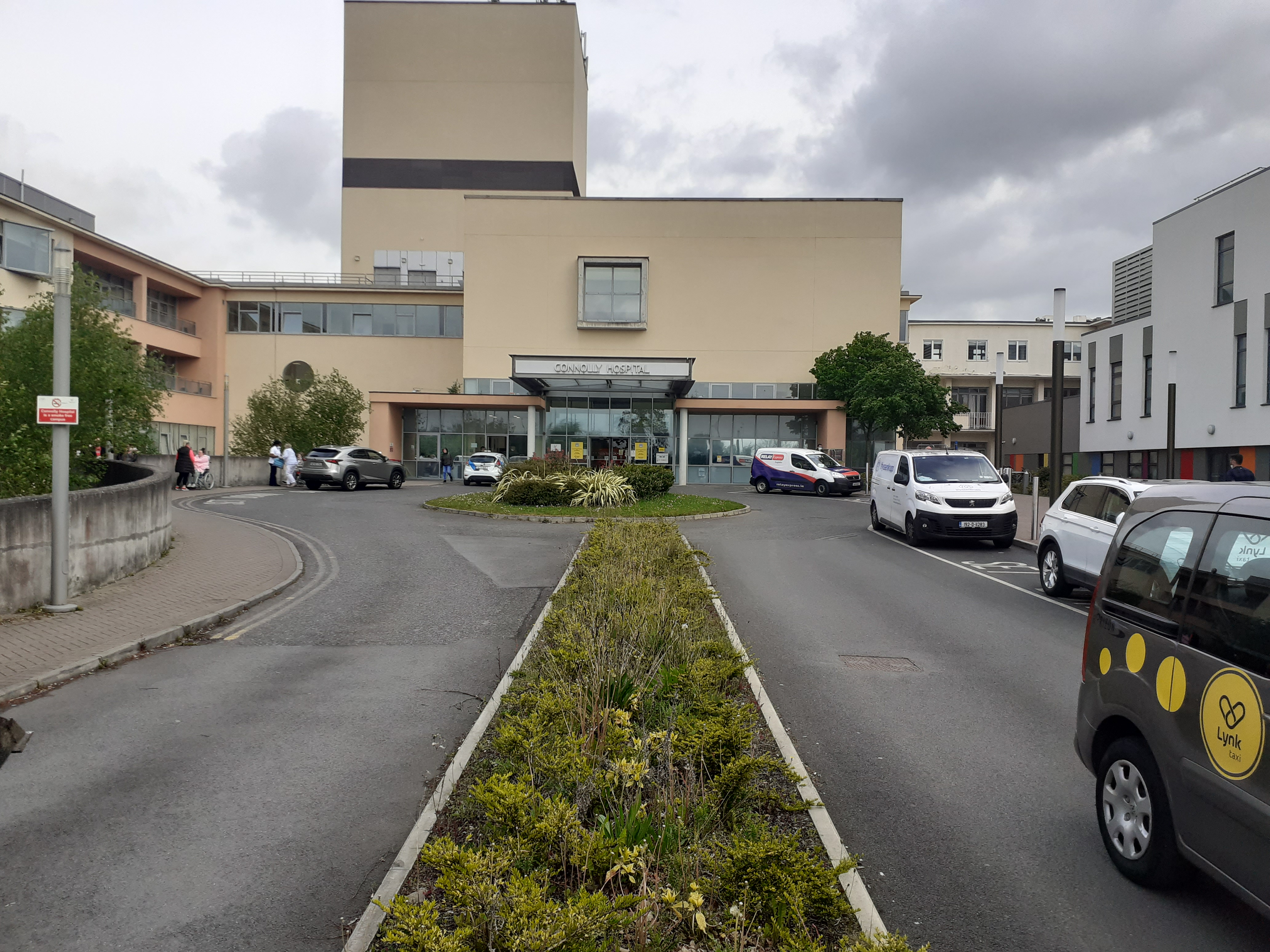
- Main entrance to Connolly Hospital

- Shown in Dublin

Geography
- Location: Blanchardstown, Fingal, Ireland
- Coordinates: 53.388541°N 6.368649°W

Organisation
- Care system: HSE
- Type: General
- Affiliated university: Royal College of Surgeons in Ireland

Services
- Emergency department: Yes
- Beds: 407

History
- Founded: 1955

Links
- Website: www.connollyhospital.ie

The Connolly Hospital Blanchardstown (Irish: Ospidéal Uí Chonghaile Baile Bhlainséir) is a teaching hospital in Blanchardstown, Dublin, Ireland. It is managed by RCSI Hospitals.

== History ==
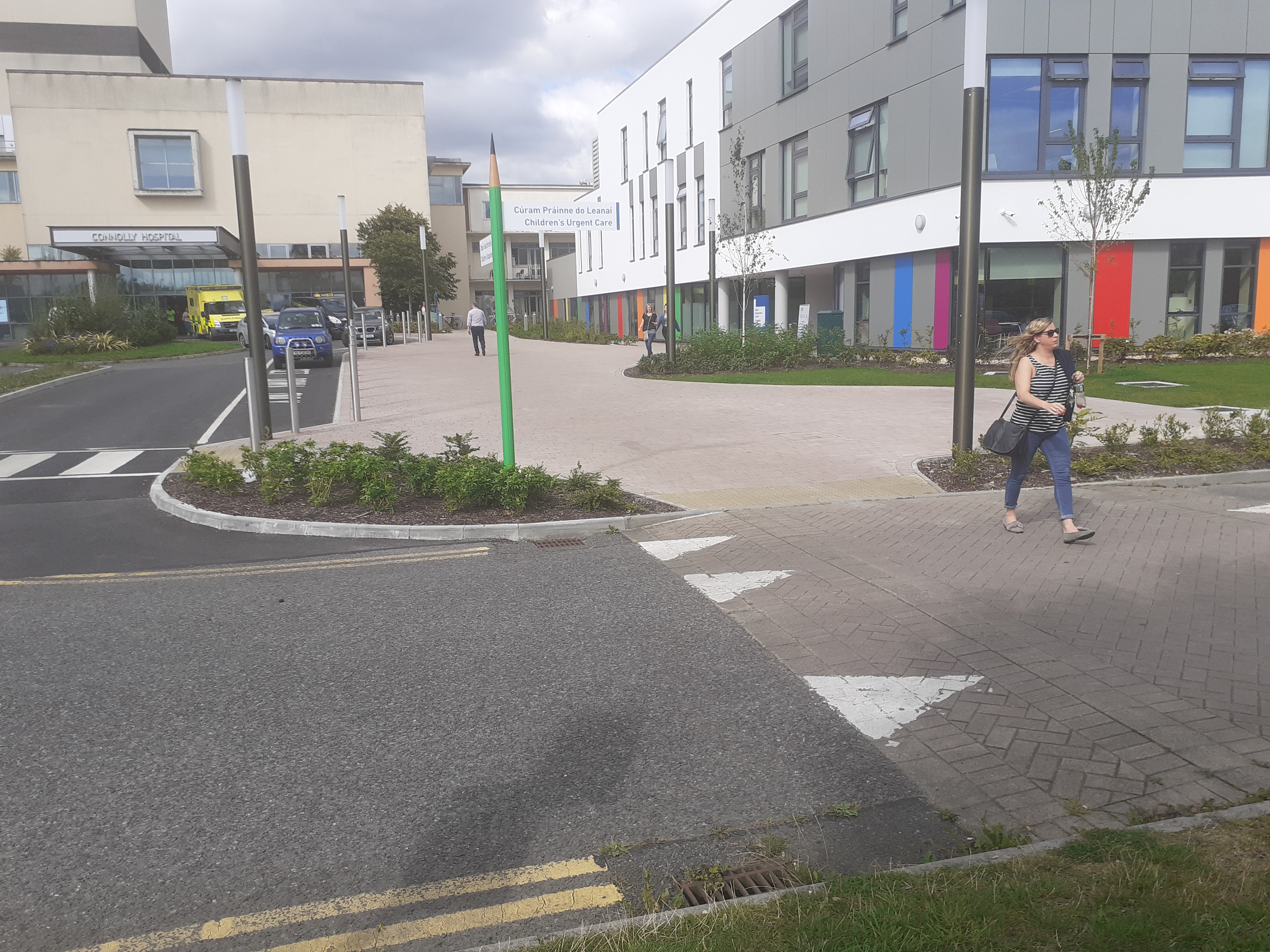
The National Children's Hospital Satellite Centre Connolly Hospital opened in 2019

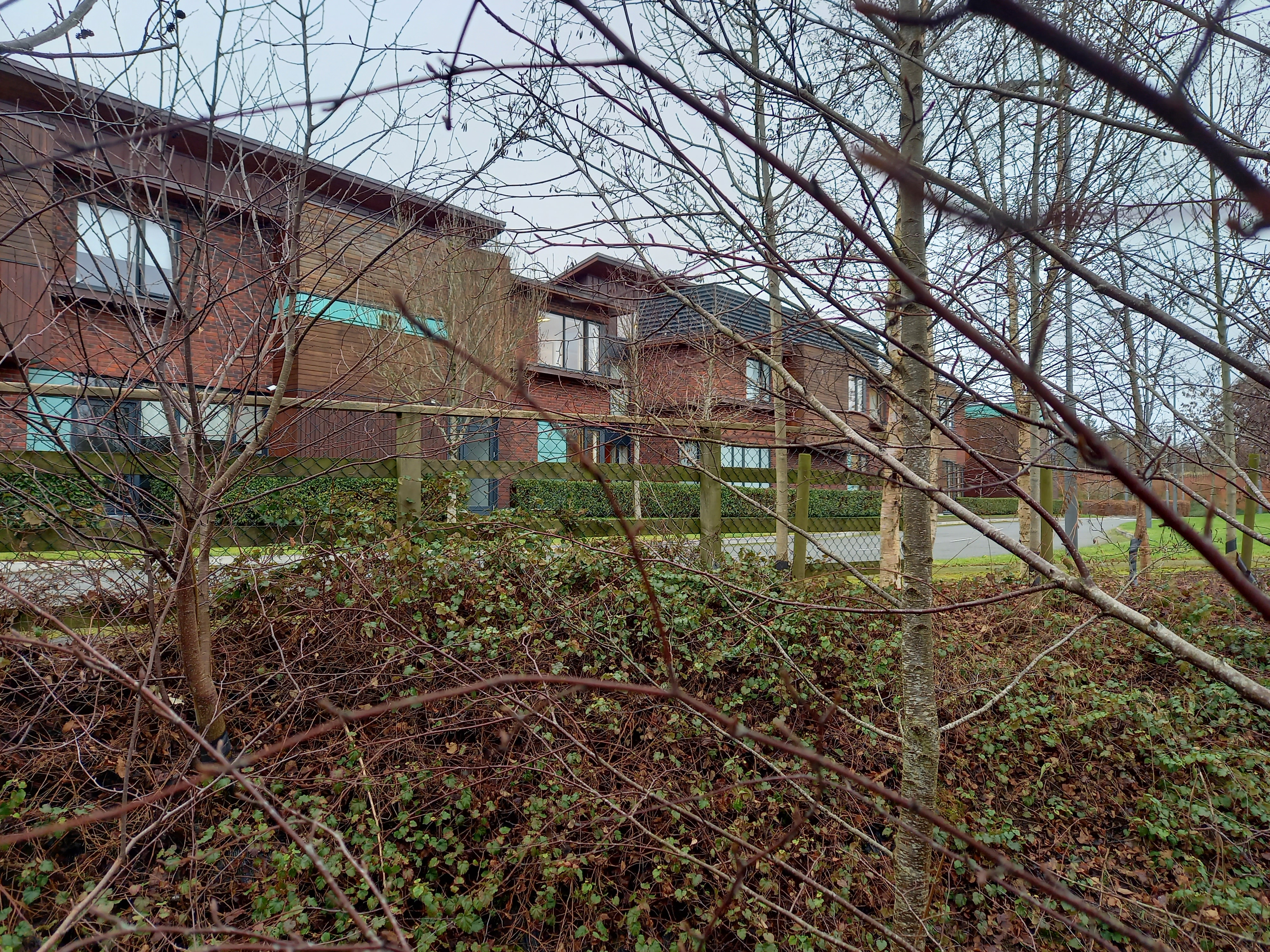
The rear of St Francis' Hospice, in the townland of Abbotstown.

The hospital, which was initially established as a tuberculosis sanitarium, was designed by Norman White and constructed by Sisk Builders. It was named in memory of the Irish republican leader, James Connolly, and officially opened as the James Connolly Memorial Hospital in 1955. Following the introduction of effective antibiotic treatment, the hospital was re-designated as a general hospital for the North West area of Dublin and re-opened as such in 1973.

In 2005 a new accident and emergency unit, new operating theatres, new surgery facilities and a new intensive care unit were officially opened by the Minister of State for Children, Brian Lenihan, who also announced that the hospital would be renamed the Connolly Hospital Blanchardstown.

The government allocated 6.8 acres on the Abbotstown lands at Blanchardstown for the building of a hospice under the care of the Daughters of Charity. This was a sister site to their hospice in Raheny. Construction works were completed in April 2011.

A satellite facility for the New Children's Hospital, providing outpatient facilities and an urgent care centre opened in summer 2019.

== Teaching ==
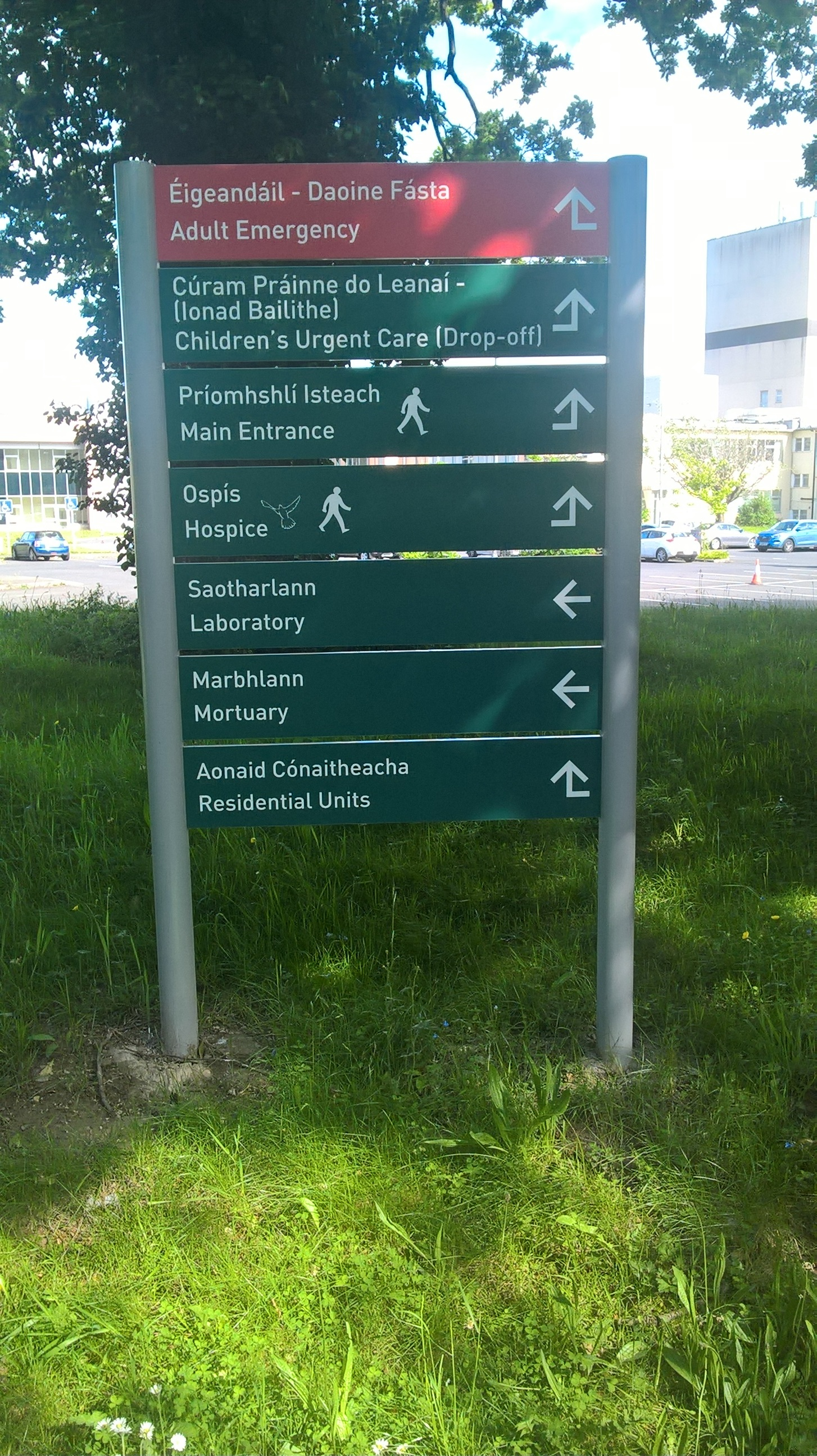
Connolly Hospital campus bilingual signs

The hospital provides clinical teaching as part of the graduate entry program to medicine for the Royal College of Surgeons in Ireland.
