= Tallaght University Hospital =

Teaching hospital in Tallaght, Ireland

- Health Service Executive
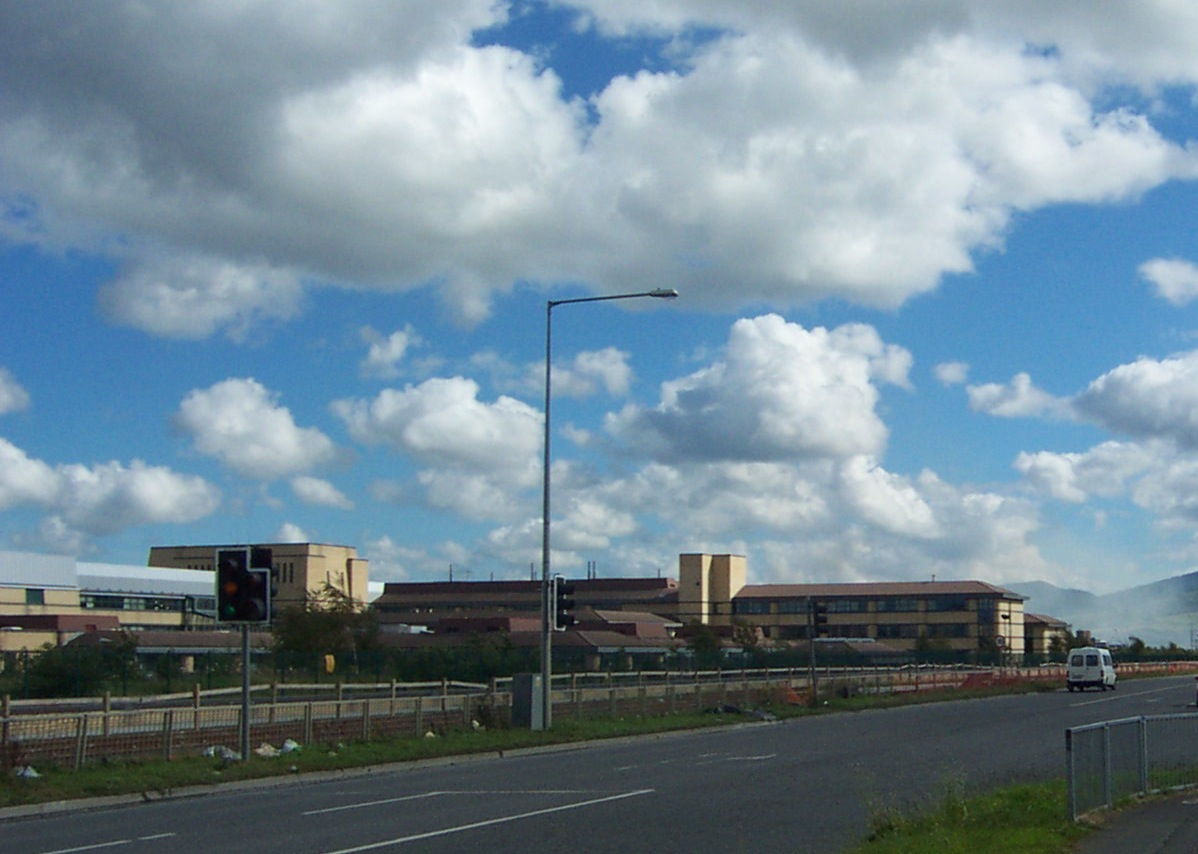
- The hospital from Cookstown Way in 2002

- Shown in Dublin

Geography
- Location: Tallaght, Dublin, Ireland
- Coordinates: 53°17′28″N 6°22′43″W

Organisation
- Care system: HSE
- Type: Teaching
- Affiliated university: Trinity College Dublin

Services
- Emergency department: Yes Accident & Emergency
- Beds: 562

History
- Founded: 1998

Links
- Website: www.tuh.ie
- Lists: Hospitals in the Republic of Ireland

The Tallaght University Hospital (Irish: Ospidéal Ollscoile Thamhlachta) is a teaching hospital in County Dublin, Ireland. Its academic partner is Trinity College Dublin. It is managed by the Dublin Midlands Hospital Group.

== History ==
The hospital, which was designed by Robinson Keefe Devane, was intended to provide the newly developed Dublin suburb of Tallaght with its own general hospital, by relocating services from three smaller sites in Dublin's city centre: the Adelaide Hospital, the Meath Hospital and the National Children's Hospital. A board of directors was established by the Minister for Health in 1980. It was built at a cost of £140 million and opened as the Adelaide and Meath Hospital, Dublin, incorporating the National Children's Hospital (AMNCH) on 21 June 1998.

In March 2010, an investigation was launched when it emerged that 58,000 X-rays had not been reviewed by a consultant radiologist. In November 2011, Minister for Health James Reilly announced "radical governance reforms" for the hospital including a slimmed down board composed of experts. It changed its name to the Tallaght Hospital in February 2012 and to the Tallaght University Hospital in March 2018.

The Children's Services Department changed its name to Children's Health Ireland at Tallaght as part of the rebranding of three hospitals under the Children's Health Ireland banner on 1 January 2019.

== Services ==
The hospital, which is a teaching hospital for Trinity College Dublin, has 562 beds.

In November 2021 the hospital installed an Integrated Clinical Environment, the first in Ireland, with order communications, results reporting and an electronic patient record provided by CliniSys.
