= Children's Health Ireland at Temple Street =

- Health Service Executive
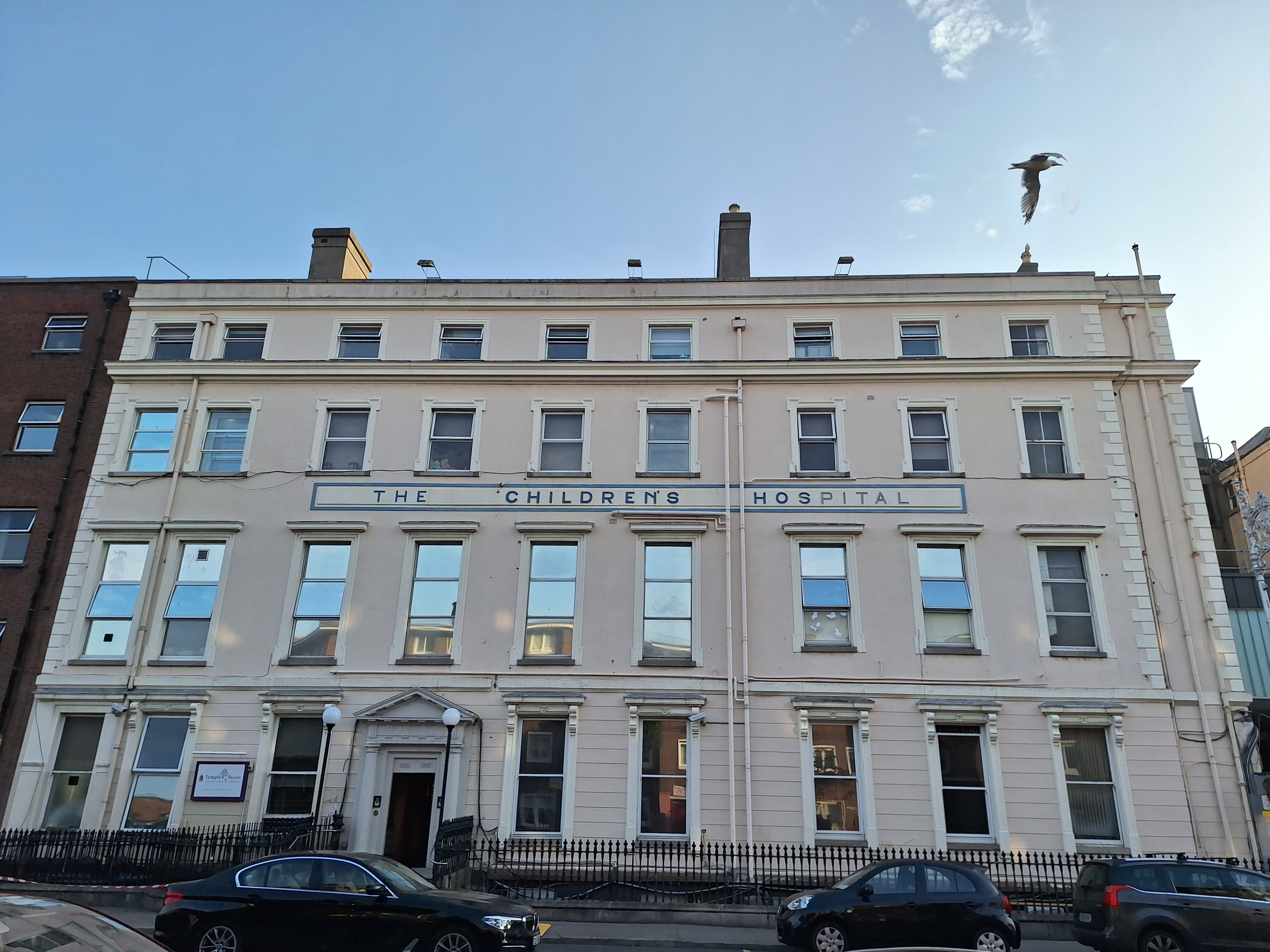
- The front façade of the hospital in 2023

- Shown in Dublin

Geography
- Location: Dublin, Ireland
- Coordinates: 53°21′24.4″N 6°15′43.3″W

Organisation
- Care system: HSE
- Type: Specialist
- Affiliated university: University College Dublin

Services
- Speciality: Children's Hospital

History
- Founded: 1872; 154 years ago

Links
- Website: www.templestreet.ie

Children's Health Ireland at Temple Street (Irish: Sláinte Leanaí Éireann ag Sráid an Teampaill) is a children's hospital located on Temple Street, Dublin, Ireland. It is a teaching hospital of University College Dublin and Trinity College Dublin.

== History ==
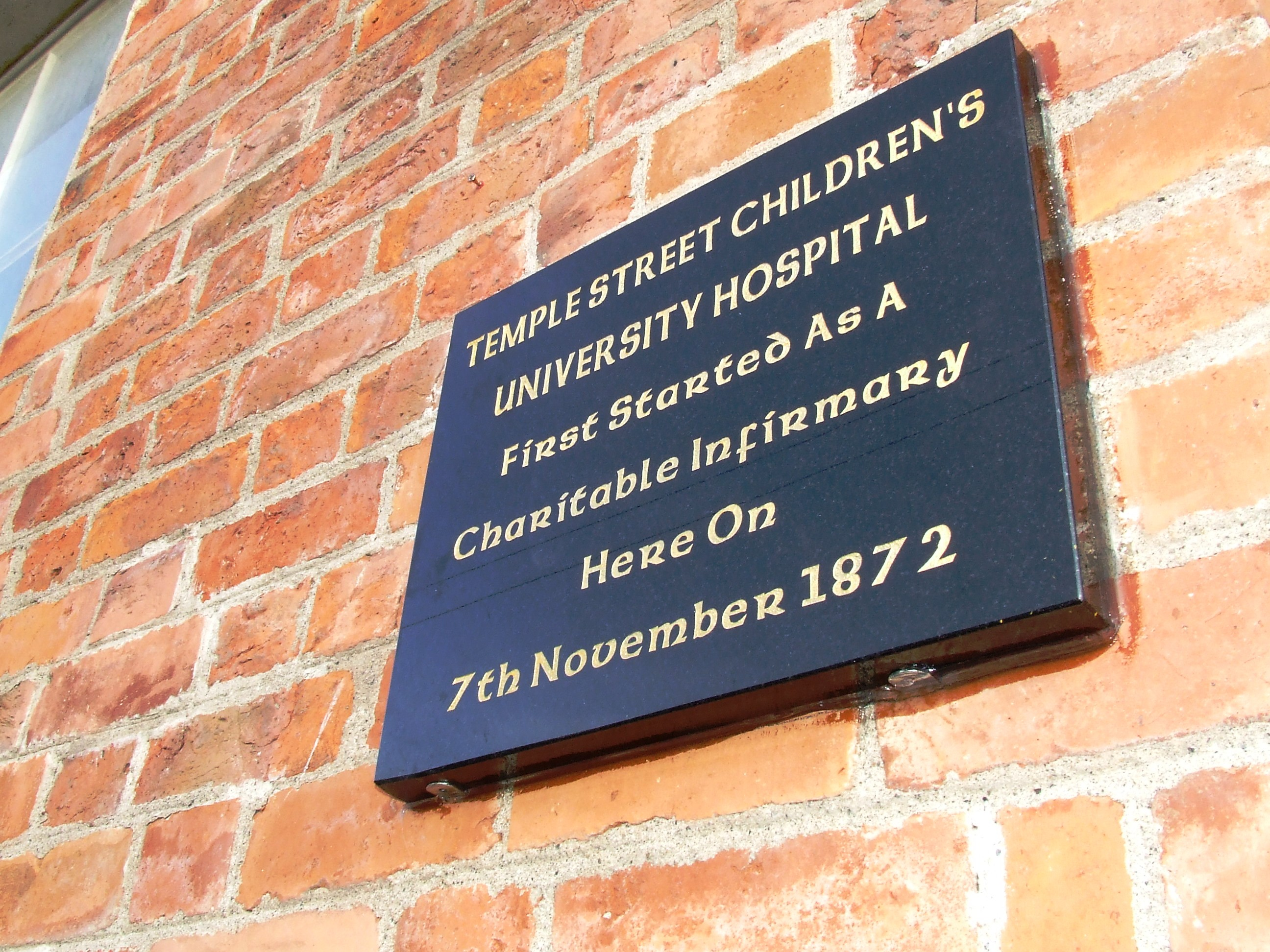
Temple Street Plaque on 9 Buckingham Street

The hospital was founded by Mrs. Ellen Woodlock and her close friend Sarah Atkinson at 9 Upper Buckingham Street in 1872. It had just 8 beds when it opened. In 1876, the growing success of the hospital prompted the governing committee to invite the Religious Sisters of Charity to take over the running of the hospital.

In May 1879 the lease at 9 Upper Buckingham Street expired and, with the help of a bequest, the sisters purchased the former home of the Earls of Bellomont at 15 Temple Street. Over the following years adjoining houses were purchased such as the residence of the Parnell family, number 14. The hospital expanded in the 1930s with help from the Irish Hospitals' Sweepstake.

A new nurses' home and a new x-ray department was officially opened by Minister of Lands, Seán Flanagan, in the presence of the President of Ireland, Éamon de Valera, in 1972.

In line with other teaching hospitals, the facility changed its name from the "Children's Hospital, Temple Street" to the "Children's University Hospital, Temple Street" in the late 1990s and changed its name again to the "Temple Street Children's University Hospital" in 2012.

In November 2012 the Minister for Health James Reilly announced plans to transfer the hospital's services to a new children's hospital on the campus of St. James's Hospital.

The hospital changed its name from Temple Street Children's University Hospital to Children's Health Ireland at Temple Street as part of the rebranding of three hospitals under the Children's Health Ireland banner on 1 January 2019.

In February 2019, A 7 year old girl named Lily Daly, died from Hydrocephalus after suffering from a cardiac arrest during an MRI Scan at the hospital. Six years later in February 2025, Lily's Parents, Brian Daly and Olivea Maguire settled a court case against the hospital and received €168,000, in compensation for their daughter's death.

=== Move to new campus ===
In December 2025, the hospital received access to the new Children's Health Ireland campus in Dublin 8 on the St. James's Hospital site. The new hospital itself is expected to be completed and fully operational in late 2026 or early 2027.

After the move it is expected the hospital will revert to the Sisters of Mercy and will be used by the Mater Misericordiae University Hospital or may form part of a new or extended function as a maternity hospital.
