= Religious Sisters of Charity =

Roman Catholic religious order founded by Mother Teresa

- Caritas Christi Urget Nos
- Formation: 15 January 1815; 211 years ago
- Founder: Mary Aikenhead
- Type: Centralized Religious Institute of Consecrated Life of Pontifical Right (for Women)
- Headquarters: Religious Sisters of Charity Generalate, Caritas, 15 Gilford Road, Sandymount D04 X337, Dublin
- Superior general: Patricia Lenihan,
- Website: rsccaritas.com
- Remarks: Motto: "The love of Christ urges us on"

The Religious Sisters of Charity, or Irish Sisters of Charity, is a Roman Catholic religious institute founded by Mary Aikenhead in Ireland on 15 January 1815. Its motto is Caritas Christi urget nos ('The love of Christ urges us on', 2 Corinthians 5:14).

The institute has its headquarters in Dublin. The congregation is governed by a congregational leader, assisted by a group of sisters known as the general leadership team or the general council. In England and Scotland, it operates as a registered charity. The Sisters of Charity of Australia is constituted as a distinct congregation.

== History ==
The religious institute was founded by Mary Frances Aikenhead (1787–1858) who opened its first convent in Dublin in 1815. In 1834 St. Vincent's Hospital in Dublin was set up by Mary Aikenhead.

In 1838 five sisters arrived in Australia — the first religious women to set foot on Australian soil — and later opened a convent in Parramatta. Since 1842 the Australian congregation has operated independently.

The sisters arrived in England in 1840. They first came to Birkenhead in 1900. As of 2020, most of the sisters in residence are involved in parish ministry. The provincial house is in Acton, London. In 1845, Mother Aikenhead had been advised for health reasons to move to the country. She purchased "Greenmount", a late 18th-century house at Harold's Cross. Renamed "Our Lady's Mount", it became the motherhouse of the congregation, housing the novitiate and a school. In 1879, the motherhouse was moved to Mount St. Anne's in Milltown. The sisters operate a heritage centre within the grounds of Our Lady's Hospice, Harold's Cross, Dublin.

== Ministry ==
In addition to the traditional three vows of poverty, chastity and obedience, the Religious Sisters of Charity take a fourth vow: to devote their lives to the service of the poor.

The community is active in Ireland, England, Scotland, Australia, California, Nigeria, Zambia and Malawi, serving in health care, education, pastoral and social work, catechesis, home visitation, home for the handicapped and adult education. The generalate is located at Sandymount, Dublin

In 1821 the Governor of Kilmainham Gaol asked the sisters to visit women inmates; prison visitation remains an important ministry for the congregation. The Stanhope Street Primary School in Dublin originally opened in 1867. A new building on the same site continues to educate students. In keeping with their work with the homeless, in June 2017 the Religious Sisters of Charity launched the opening of 28 new homes for disabled, homeless and vulnerable people, in Harold's Cross, Dublin.

The Religious Sisters of Charity arrived in Nigeria in 1961. In Lagos, Nigeria the sisters staff St. Joseph's Clinic, Kirikiri.

=== Hospice work ===
- When the congregation's motherhouse moved to Mount St. Anne's in 1879, the sisters opened Our Lady's Hospice at Harold's Cross, pioneering the modern hospice movement under the superior, Anna Gaynor. By the following year, it had a capacity of forty beds.
  - In December 2003, Our Lady's Hospice opened a satellite unit for specialist palliative care in Blackrock, Co. Dublin, provided through the generosity of the Louis and Zelie Martin Foundation.
- In 1905 they established St. Joseph's Hospice in Hackney. In August 1939, St. Joseph's Hospice was taken over as an Air Raid Casualty Station and the patients moved to a nursing home in Bath. In 1952, Cicely Saunders, a pioneer in palliative care came to work at St. Joseph's, where she would remain for seven years, researching pain control. The hospice subsequently became a limited company and took over the convent for additional space, while St. Joseph's Convent was relocated to a new building on the grounds with a dedicated care component.
- The community expanded its work to Scotland in 1948, and two years later opened St. Margaret's Hospice in Clydebank. Due to increased demand, in September 1971 a new St. Margaret of Scotland Hospice, with a sixty-bed capacity was opened nearby. That too has subsequently been expanded.
- In 1957, at the request of Bishop James Scanlan of Motherwell, four sisters, with the assistance of the Society of Saint Vincent de Paul established a Nursing Home for the frail elderly and terminally ill at Assumption House in Airdrie, North Lanarkshire. Initially providing thirteen beds, by 1965 it accommodated twenty-one. By the end of the 1970s it became apparent that much of the space was occupied by long-term elderly patients, to the almost the complete exclusion of the terminally ill. Additional space was needed, and as Assumption House required significant repair, the sisters arranged to take over the former St. Margaret's School. St. Andrew's Hospice opened in 1986 with a capacity for thirty beds; an extension was added in 2006 for offices and administration.

In 1892, Agnes Bernard of the Sisters of Charity started a convent and woollen mill in Foxford in County Mayo. The woollen mills are still (2017) an important employer.

== Controversies ==
=== Child abuse ===
The Sisters of Charity is one of 18 religious congregations which managed residential institutions for children investigated by the Commission to Inquire into Child Abuse, and was party to the €128-million indemnity agreement with the Republic of Ireland State in 2002.

The commission's work started in 1999 and it published its public report, commonly referred to as the Ryan Report, on 20 May 2009. Following publication of the Ryan Report in 2009 the Sisters of Charity offered to contribute a further €5 million towards the €1.5 billion redress costs incurred by the state involving former residents of the institutions.

As of 2017, the Sisters of Charity had contributed €2 million of their 2009 offer plus €3m in waived legal costs from the Commission to Inquire into Child Abuse.

=== Magdalene asylums ===
The Religious Sisters of Charity were one of four Catholic organisations that ran Magdalene laundries (or asylums) in Ireland. These institutions operated from the 18th to the late 20th century to house "fallen women".

In 1993, to allow for the sale of laundry and convent lands for a private housing development in High Park, Dublin, a licensed exhumation of a mass grave that had been in use between the 1880-1970s took place. The mass grave was found to contain the remains of 155 women - 22 more bodies than had originally been reported to have been buried there. Many of the bodies exhibited evidence of harm, such as broken limbs encased in plaster. The United Nations Committee on the Rights of the Child ultimately called for a government inquiry, as did the United Nations Committee Against Torture (UNCAT). UNCAT also called for a redress scheme to be set up for survivors. A formal state apology was issued in 2013, and a €50–60 million compensation scheme for survivors was established. Neither the Catholic Church, nor the four religious institutes that ran the Irish asylums have as yet contributed to the survivor's fund, despite demands from the Irish government.

Senator Martin McAleese chaired an Inter-Departmental Committee to establish the facts of state involvement with the Magdalen Laundries. An interim report was released in October 2011. In 2013 the BBC released a special investigation, Sue Lloyd-Roberts' "Demanding justice for women and children abused by Irish nuns." The Sisters of Mercy, Sisters of Our Lady of Charity of the Good Shepherd, and Sisters of Charity, have ignored requests by the UN Committee on the Rights of the Child and the UN Committee Against Torture to contribute to the compensation fund for victims, including 600 still alive in March 2014. In 2013 the Sisters of Charity, along with the three other religious congregations which managed Magdalene laundries, announced that they would not be making any contribution to the State redress scheme for women who had been in the laundries.

=== St. Vincent Hospital ===
In May 2013, it was announced that the new National Maternity Hospital, Dublin, would be built on a site at St. Vincent's University Hospital, Elm Park, founded in 1834 by Mother Mary Aikenhead, foundress of the Religious Sisters of Charity, with the sisters having ownership, involvement in management, and representation on the board. On 29 May 2017, in response to weeks of pressure and public outrage, the Sisters of Charity announced that they were ending their role in St Vincent's Healthcare Group and would not be involved in the ownership or management of the new hospital, and would gift the lands to the St Vincent's Healthcare Group, worth some €200 million; the two sisters on the board resigned. It later emerged that the mechanism for control of the hospital going forward was to transfer ownership to a trust - St. Vincent's Holdings - which would take over the hospital when the new building, costing €1 billion and being paid for by the state, was complete. St. Vincent's Holdings would then lease the hospital back to the state for 99 years. This time period was later extended to 299 years.

== See also ==
- Magdalene Laundries in Ireland
