= Ross Lewis =

Ross Lewis may refer to:

- Ross Lewis (chef) (born 1965), Irish chef
- Ross Lewis (photographer) (born 1943), American fine arts photographer
- Ross A. Lewis (1902–1977), American cartoonist
