= Cineworld Dublin =

Cinema in Dublin, Ireland

- Virgin Cinemas Dublin (1995–1999); UGC Dublin (1999–2005)
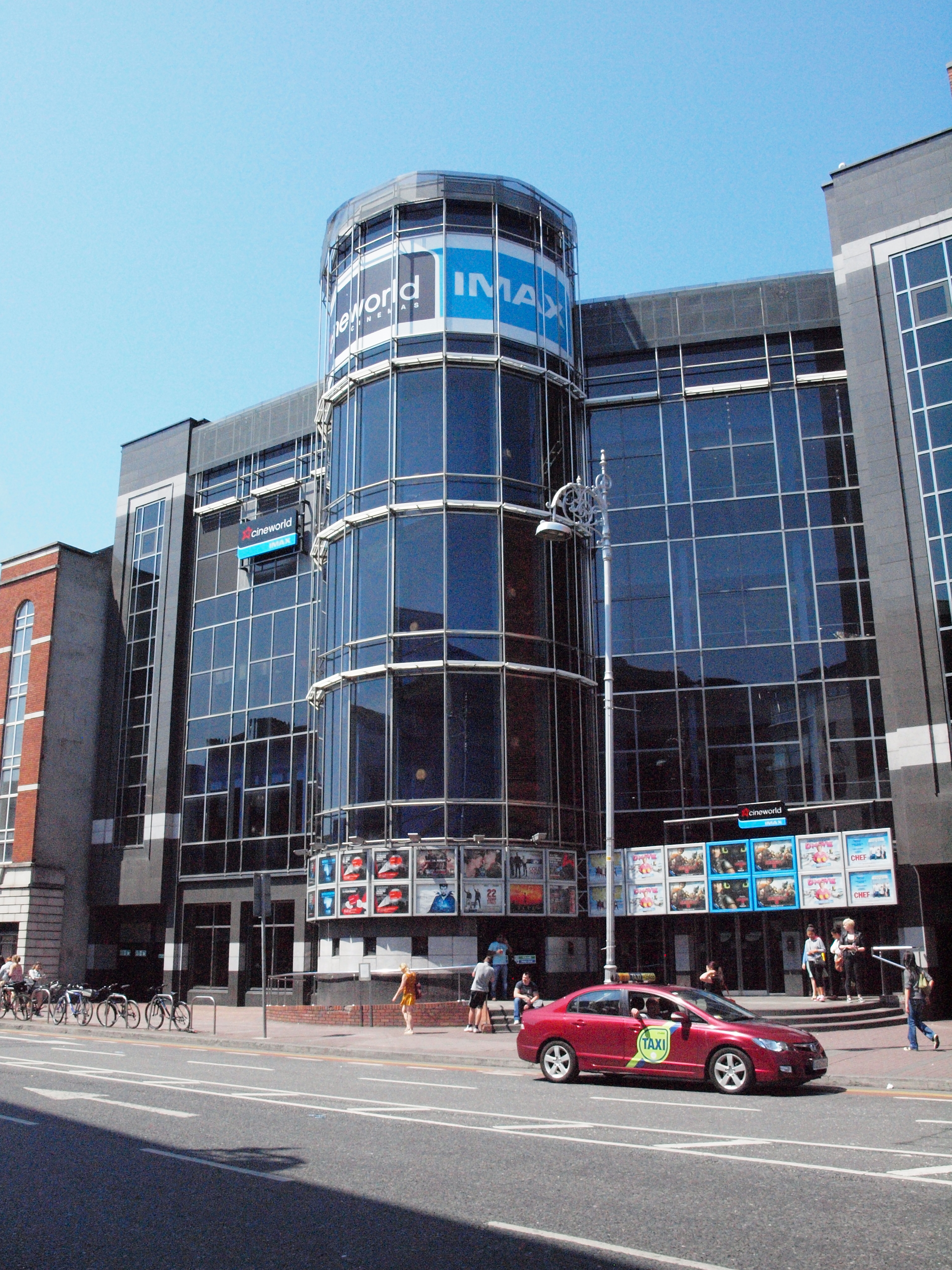
- The cinema in 2014

- Location within Central Dublin
- Address: Parnell Centre, Parnell Street; Dublin; Ireland
- Coordinates: 53.350449°N 6.26707°W
- Owner: Cineworld
- Type: Cinema
- Screen: 17

Construction
- Opened: 17 November 1995

Website
- cineworld.ie

Cineworld Dublin is a cinema in Dublin notable for being the biggest cinema in Ireland, with 4 floors and 17 screens. It is located on Parnell Street in Dublin, Ireland and is owned by the Cineworld cinema chain.

== History ==
The cinema was constructed in the early 1990s on the site of the former Simpson's Hospital which was demolished around 1978 after operating as part of the offices of Williams and Woods sweet and jam factory since 1876.

It was opened by Virgin Cinemas on 17 November 1995 as Virgin Cinemas Dublin, the only cinema that was opened by Virgin Cinemas in Ireland. It opened next door to a Virgin Megastore that was built in the same location. The event marking the cinema's opening featured appearances from French mimes Laetilla Mace and Thierry Balssa. The first film to premiere at the cinema was The Brothers McMullen. Tower Records competed against the opening of the cinema with an in-store concert by the rock band Whipping Boy and performances from singers Andy White and Gavin Friday.

In 1999, the Virgin Group sold Virgin Cinemas to French cinema chain, UGC. All Virgin Cinemas were rebranded as UGC and Virgin Cinemas Dublin was renamed UGC Dublin in 1999.

The current front entrance was originally opened as a separate IMAX 70mm cinema in about 1998. It was bought by the UGC cinema next door and converted into UGC's replacement front entrance. The one IMAX screen was converted into 5+ extra cinemas (to add to UGC's existing screens), a bar, shop, and ticketing area. In 2012 screen 17 on the top floor was refurbished to support digital IMAX (smaller, lower resolution than 70mm IMAX film). It is considerably smaller in size than the original IMAX screen housed by the building.

In 2004, UGC's UK and Ireland operations were taken over by Cineworld. In 2005, the UGC cinemas in the UK and Ireland were rebranded as Cineworld. UGC Dublin was renamed Cineworld Dublin.
