= Williams and Woods =

Former confectionary business in Dublin, Ireland

Williams and Woods was a confectionery business in Dublin, Ireland.

== History ==
Henry Williams opened his original confectionery shop on Dame Street in the 1850s. Robert Woods joined him some years later as a business partner and the company was renamed Williams and Woods. On opening, the factory employed 400 worker, mainly women from the local area. The company had its own cow's milk herd in North Dublin as well as a fruit farm in Kilsallaghan, County Dublin. In 1875, the company moved to the former Simpson's Hospital on Great Britain Street (now Parnell Street), later replaced by Cineworld Dublin.

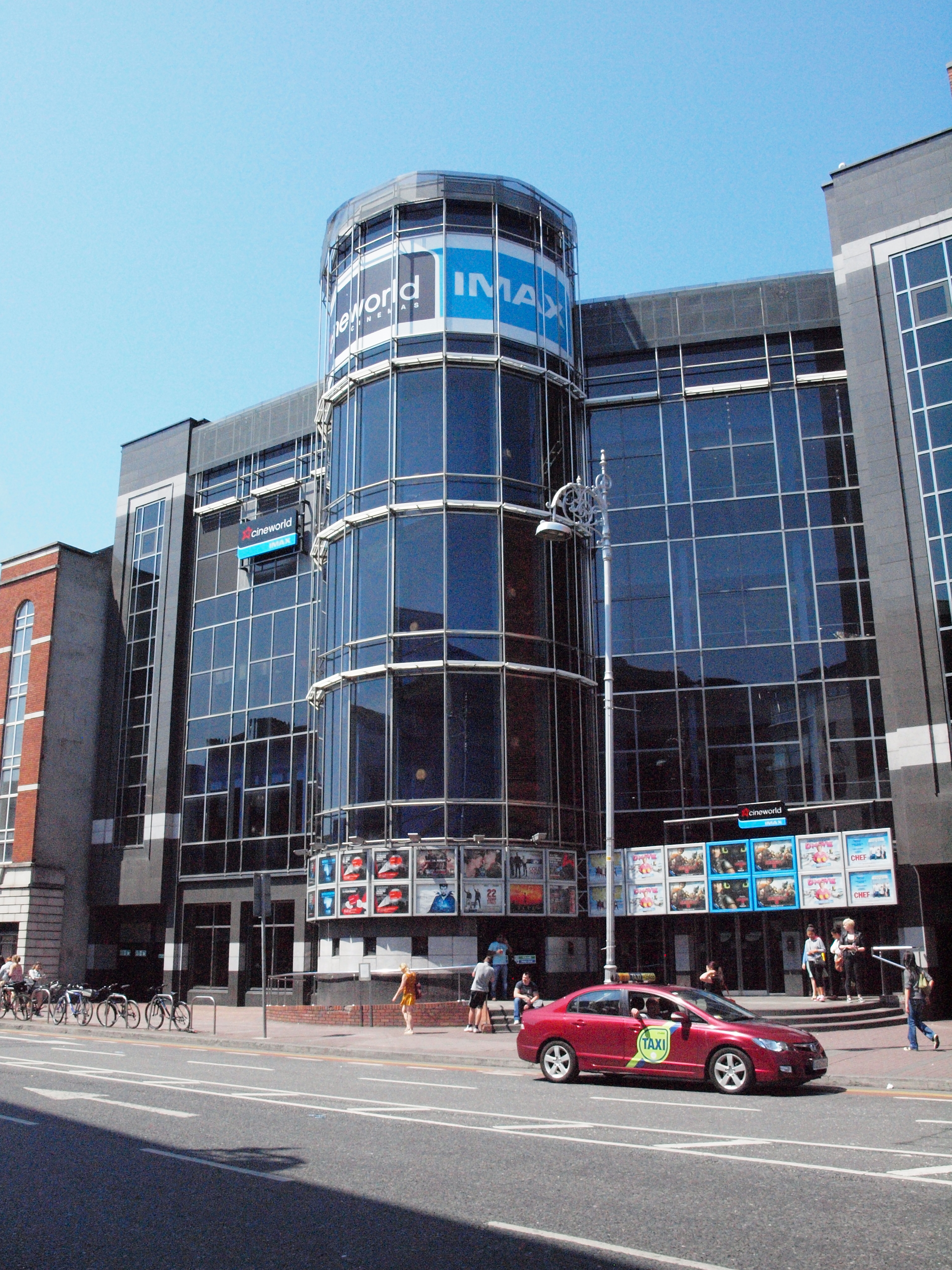
Cineworld cinema at the site of the former Williams and Woods operations

By the 1890s, the company had expanded to 26 King's Inns Street, at the corner of Loftus Lane, adjacent to Henrietta Street.

During the visit of Britain's Queen Victoria to Dublin in 1900, Williams and Woods provided 10,000 bags of sweets and 1 ton of jam for the Queen's Children's Day event in the Phoenix Park, which was attended by fifteen thousand children. In 1907, the company had an exhibit at the Irish International Exhibition in Herbert Park. During the 1916 Easter Rising, the rebels laid plans to occupy the Williams and Woods factory building but this did not come to pass.

In 1928, the company was acquired by the English company Crosse & Blackwell.

By the 1950s, the workforce had grown to 1,000 and the company had expanded to producing good for other brands, including Crosse & Blackwell and Chef. In the 1960s, artist Patricia Hurl's first job was in the office of Williams and Woods as a comptometer operator.

The company was ultimately taken over by Nestlé after its UK parent, Crosse & Blackwell, was acquired in 1960.

In 1975, the company by then known as Willwood moved its operations out of Dublin city centre to a modern manufacturing facility in Tallaght.

The remaining portion of the Irish entity was taken over in 1977 with the brands being phased out over the next two decades.

== Building ==
=== Modernist factory ===
The Art Deco factory at 26 King's Inns Street was designed by Donnelly and Moore architects and built by G&T Crampton in 1910. It was further extended in the 1920s and 1941. The site had previously been home to a confectionery factory that had been built in 1856 but had been destroyed by fire in 1908. Dublin City Council includes the building on its Record of Protected Structures, reference number 8905.

In 2012, the building was converted into an arts centre, which launched in 2014 as The Chocolate Factory.

=== Georgian building ===
The former Simpson's Hospital building on Parnell Street was sold off to developers after the factory's move in 1975 and ultimately demolished.
