= Chapter One (restaurant) =

Restaurant in Dublin, Ireland

Coordinates: 53°21′15.21″N 6°15′50.96″W

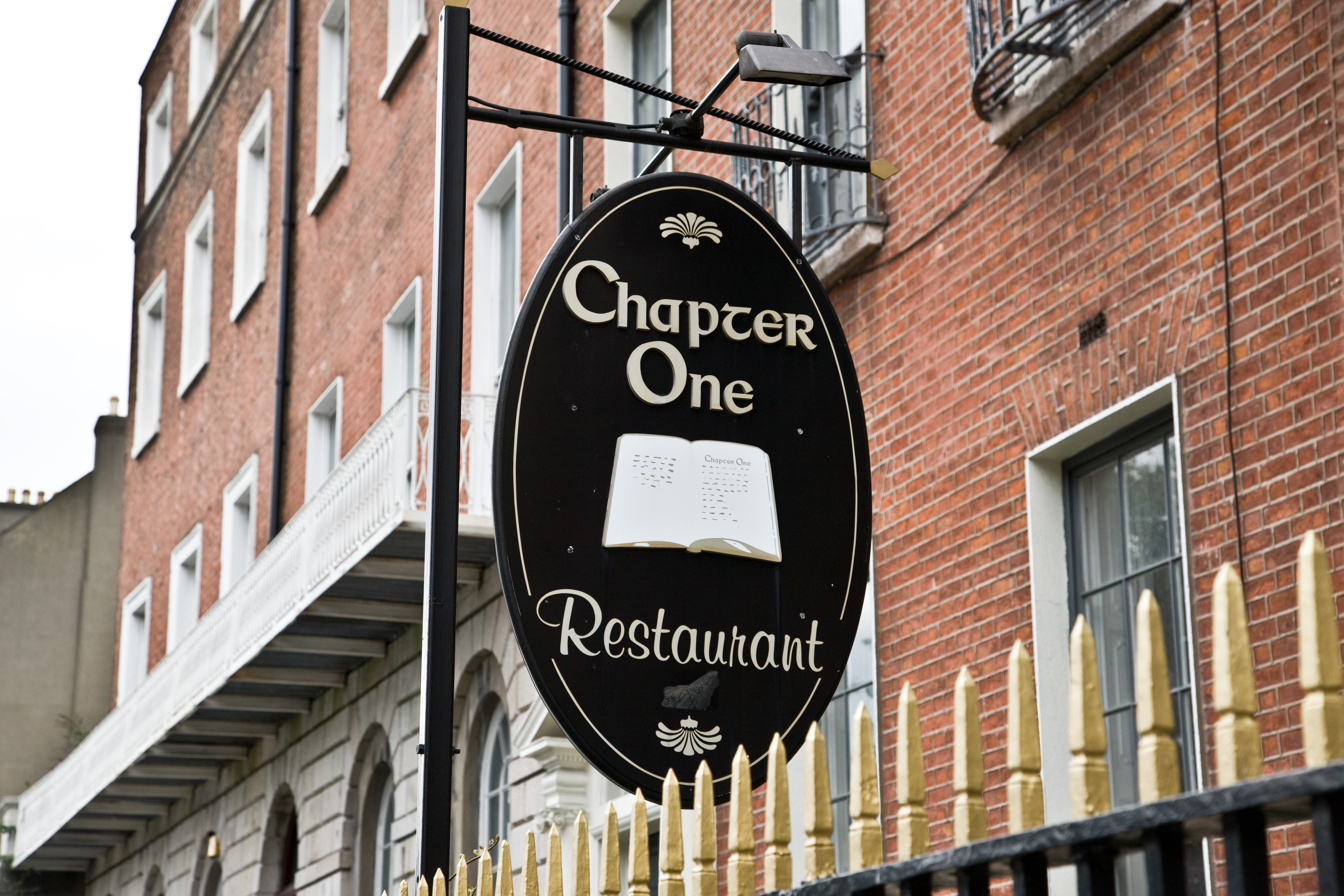
- Interactive map of Chapter One

Restaurant information
- Established: 1992
- Owners: Ross Lewis, Mickael Viljanen
- Head chef: Mickael Viljanen
- Food type: European
- Rating: Michelin Guide
- Location: 18–19 Parnell Square, Dublin, Ireland
- Website: www.chapteronerestaurant.com

Chapter One is a restaurant in Parnell Square in Dublin, Ireland. It is a fine dining restaurant that has been awarded two Michelin stars since 2022. It previously held one star between 2007 and 2021. The Michelin Guide awarded the restaurant the "Red M", indicating 'good food at a reasonable price', in the period 1996–2001.

The restaurant is located in the basement of the Dublin Writers Museum and the Irish Writers’ Centre. The name of the restaurant refers to that.

In 2007 and 2008 the restaurant was completely renovated and modernised. New rules for hygiene and working conditions made that necessary.

On May 21, 2021, The Irish Times announced that chef Mickael Viljanen had entered into a business partnership with head chef and owner Ross Lewis, and would take over as the head chef of Chapter One. Lewis stays on as co-owner.

== Awards ==
Chapter One was awarded numerous awards and prizes during its existence. Here an overview from the years 2005–2010:

"Food & Wine" awards

- Best Restaurant - 2006, 2009, 2010
- Best Dublin Restaurant - 2008
- Best Chef - 2010
- Best Sommelier - 2009

RAI awards (Restaurants Association of Ireland)

- Best Restaurant - 2003, 2006, 2007, 2009, 2010, 2011, 2012
- Best Chef - 2008
- Best Chef Dublin - 2009
- Best Restaurant Dublin - 2009
- Best Wine List - 2009

Other awards

- Michelin Star - since 2007
- "The Dubliner Best Chefs" Chef - 2009
- Dubliner Magazine Restaurant of the Year - 2006 and 2008
- Baileys/Eurotoques Young Chef - Winner 2005

== See also ==
- List of Michelin starred restaurants in Ireland
