= Parnell Square =

Georgian square in Dublin, Ireland

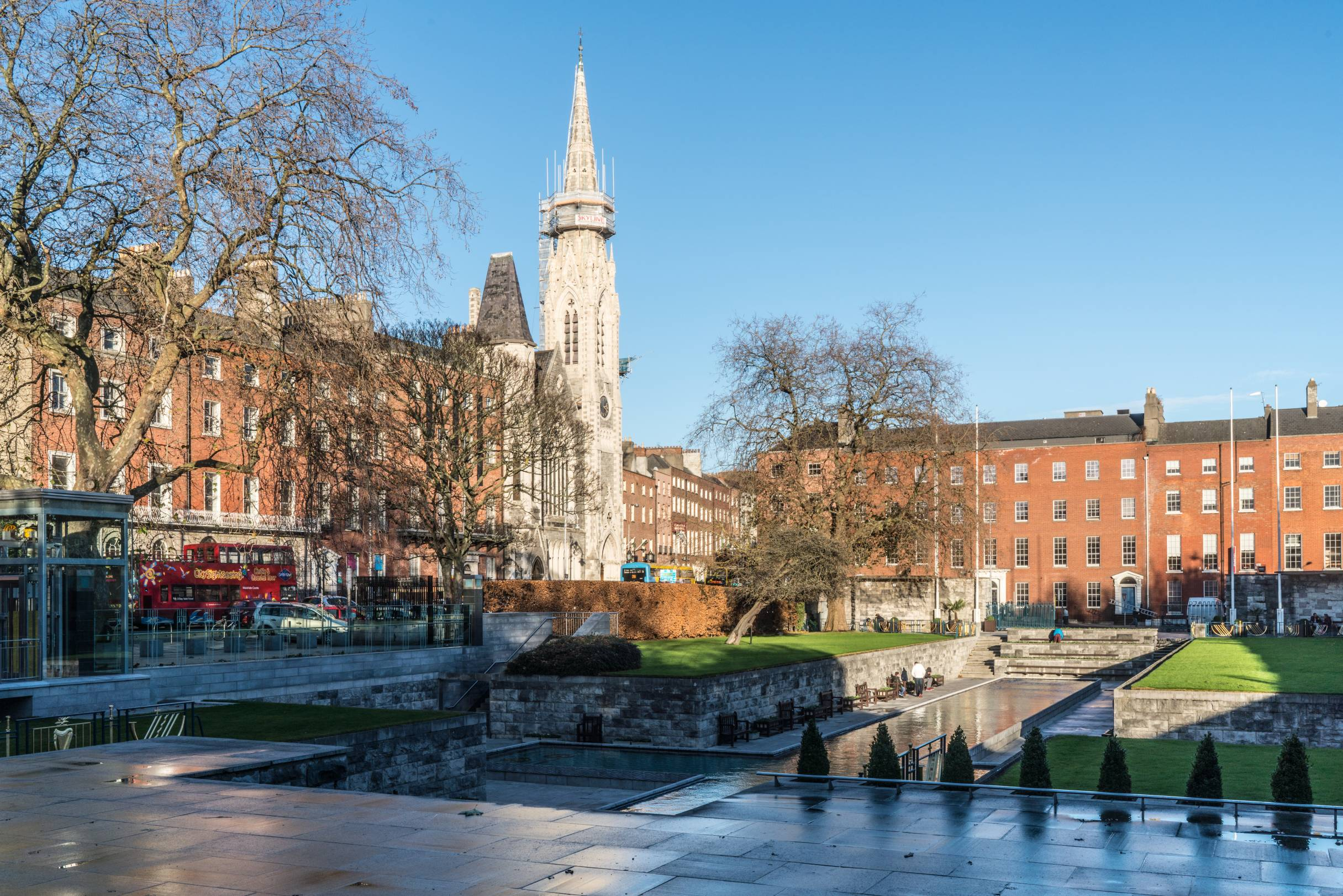
- Parnell Square looking towards Abbey Presbyterian Church from the Garden of Remembrance

- Location within Central Dublin
- Native name: Cearnóg Parnell (Irish)
- Former name: Rutland Square
- Namesake: Charles Stewart Parnell
- Area: 4.4 hectares (11 acres)
- Location: Dublin, Ireland
- Postal code: D01
- Coordinates: 53.353165°N 6.263286°W

Other
- Known for: Hugh Lane Gallery

Parnell Square (Irish: Cearnóg Parnell) is a Georgian square sited at the northern end of O'Connell Street in the city of Dublin, Ireland. It is in the city's D01 postal district.

== History ==
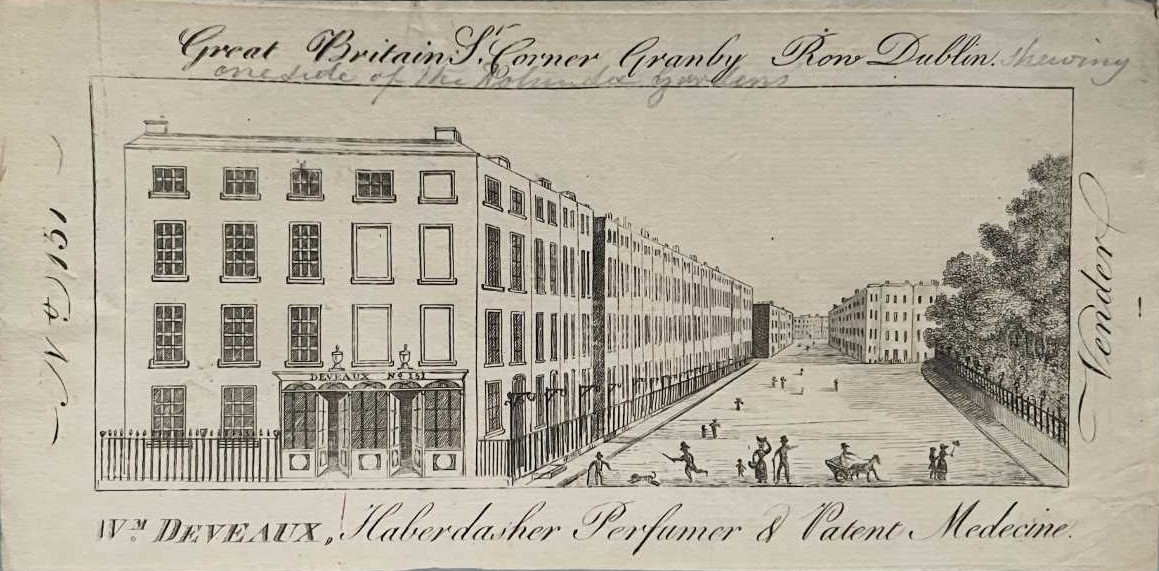
Trade card from the 1700s showing the corner of Ruthland Square (modern-day Parnell Square) and Great Britain Street (Parnell Street) advertising the premises of William Deveaux: haberdasher, perfumer and 'patent medecine vender'

Formerly named Ruthland Square, it was renamed after Charles Stewart Parnell (1846–1891), as was Parnell Street, which forms the southern side of the square. Surrounded on three sides by terraces of original intact Georgian houses, much of the southern part of the square and its centre is taken up by extensions of the Rotunda Hospital while the Garden of Remembrance is located along the northern side of this area. The main entrance to the Garden of Remembrance is on the eastern side of the square, with a smaller entrance on the northern side of the square.

== Notable buildings on the square ==
The Gate Theatre and the Ambassador and Pillar Room venues are located at the southeastern corner of the square, where it meets O'Connell Street. Entertainments were originally developed here as part of the Rotunda Hospital scheme by Bartholomew Mosse as a revenue engine to pay for the running of what was Europe's first lying-in maternity hospital. Extensive pleasure gardens, subsequently forming the body of the square, were located to the rear of the hospital in the original development.

The Hugh Lane Gallery is on the north side of the square and is entered through the grandest original house on the square, Charlemont House. It was erected in cut stone by Lord Charlemont to a design by William Chambers during the Georgian period. On this side also is the Dublin Writers Museum and the Irish Writers' Centre. The striking Gothic Revival Findlater's Church (Abbey Presbyterian Church) just up from the gallery on the same side was erected in the 1860s by Alexander Findlater, at his own expense, and which he presented to the Presbyterian congregation. One of Dublin's most acclaimed restaurants, Chapter One, is located on the northern side of Parnell Square between the Hugh Lane Gallery and the Writers Museum. On the south side of the square is Conway's bar (now closed), outside of which Patrick Pearse surrendered to the British Army after the 1916 Easter Rising. The political party Sinn Féin has its Dublin head office and shop on the western side of the square The western side also is known for offices of a number of trades unions and other organisations. Also on the western side is the St. Martin's Apostolate office, which includes a small basement chapel. The St. Martin's Apostolate office is well known in Dublin for its moving crib that is open to the public each Christmas.

== Famous historic residents and events ==
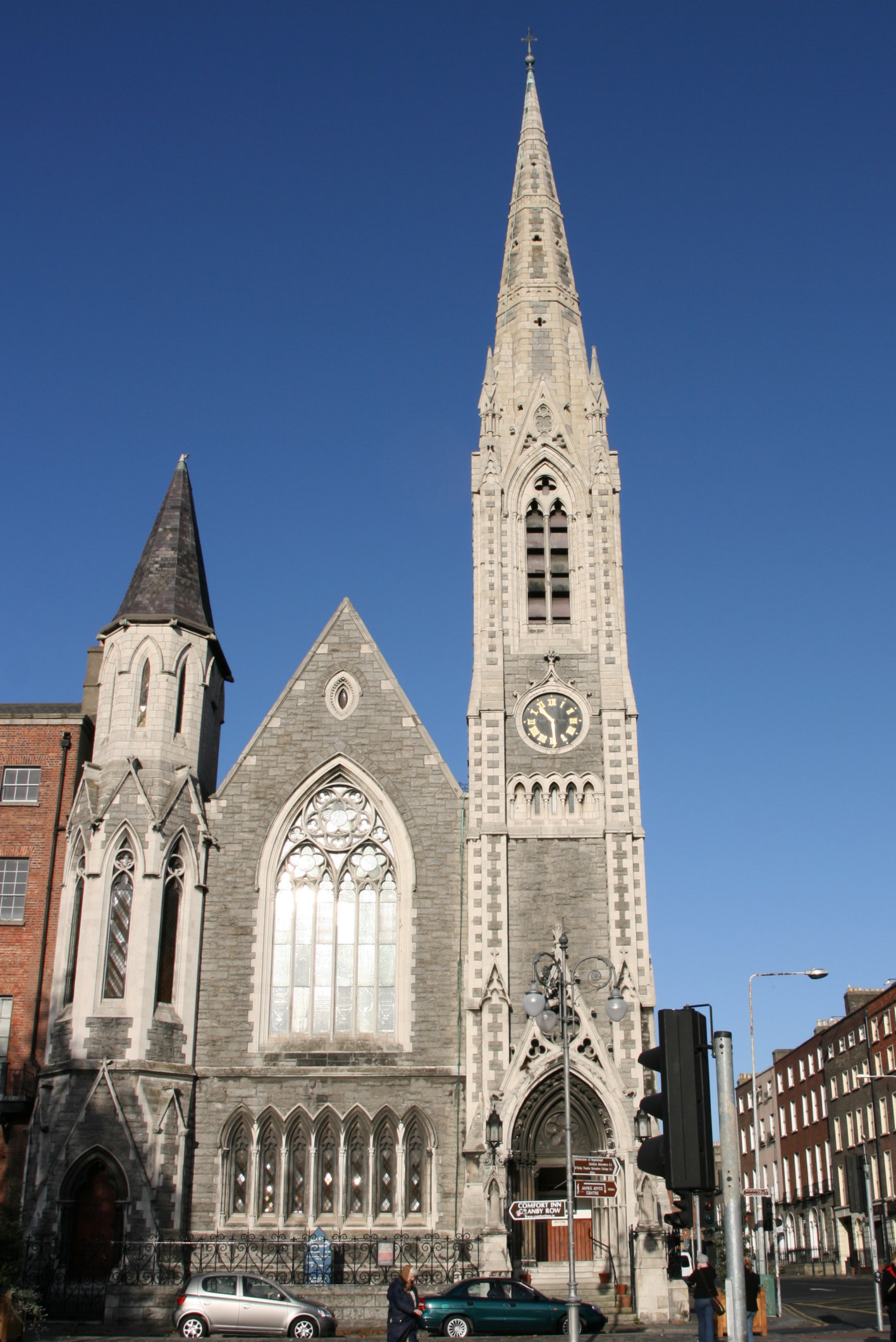
Abbey Presbyterian Church

No 5 – Birthplace of Oliver St John Gogarty (1878–1957); writer, surgeon, and senator. A friend of Michael Collins and the writers W. B. Yeats and James Joyce, Gogarty was unwillingly immortalised as Buck Mulligan in the Ulysses. From the early 1920s until the early 1930s No 5 served as the headquarters of Cumann na nGaedheal, the governing party.

No 9 Cavendish Row – Dr Bartholomew Mosse (1713–1759); Philanthropist and surgeon. Mosse lived here, having originally hailed from Portlaoise. He founded the Rotunda Hospital, located in the square which was built to designs of Richard Cassels between 1751 and 1757. The emergence of Parnell Square as a square is largely attributable to him as he laid out pleasure gardens to pay for the hospital.

No. 14 Parnell Square was the headquarters of Conradh na Gaeilge in the 1940s and 1950s and perhaps into the 1960s. The Ard-chraobh of the Gaelic League was in this building.

No 25 Parnell Square, Gaelic League building. This building is of great significance during the period surrounding the War of Independence as it was here on 9 September 1914 that a meeting held by the Supreme Council of the Irish Republican Brotherhood (IRB) with selected others agreed to rise up against the British before the Great War, subsequently known as the First World War, would be finished: In attendance were Éamonn Ceannt, Thomas Clarke, James Connolly, Arthur Griffith, John MacBride, Seán Mac Diarmada, Sean McGarry, William "Bill" O'Brien, Seán T. O'Kelly, Padraig Pearse, Joseph Plunkett.

No 29 – 30 Parnell Square – Formerly Vaughan's Hotel; a favourite hiding and meeting place for Michael Collins.

No 41 Parnell Square – this building was formerly the Irish National Forester's Hall. Prior to 1916, it was used for drilling both by the Irish Republican Brotherhood (IRB) and the Volunteers; on the eve of the outbreak of the Easter Rising Éamon de Valera assembled the 3rd Battalion here. In 1922, subsequent to the Treaty and prior to the Civil War, the IRB again met here in a failed attempt at achieving consensus on the Treaty; among the attendees were Michael Collins, Harry Boland, Liam Lynch and Eoin O'Duffy – all of whom, except O'Duffy, were dead by the end of the Irish Civil War.

No 44 Parnell Square – The Kevin Barry memorial hall is the current headquarters of Sinn Féin.

No 46 Parnell Square – Formerly the Headquarters of Conradh na Gaeilge, the Irish language league, this was the venue where Thomas MacDonagh assembled the 2nd Battalion the Sunday night on the eve of the 1916 Easter Rising. In August 1917, the meetings that led to the National Executive of the Irish Republican Army being established were also here, with persons present including Éamon de Valera, Thomas Ashe, Cathal Brugha, and Michael Collins. Subsequently, on 19 September 1919, in the company of Richard Mulcahy, Michael Collins set up his famous "Squad", composed of top-level operatives – men who would ultimately be involved with highest priority missions, such as the elimination of the British "G Men" agents in 1920.

No 58 Parnell Square – The Sinn Féin Bookshop and the offices of the An Phoblacht newspaper.

== Future development ==
There are plans for the development of the northern side of Parnell Square into a cultural district. The street will be turned into a pedestrian space, the city's main library will move to the former Coláiste Mhuire buildings, a new auditorium will be built, and the gardens attached to the Rotunda Hospital will be opened up.

== Gallery ==
Views Around Parnell Square
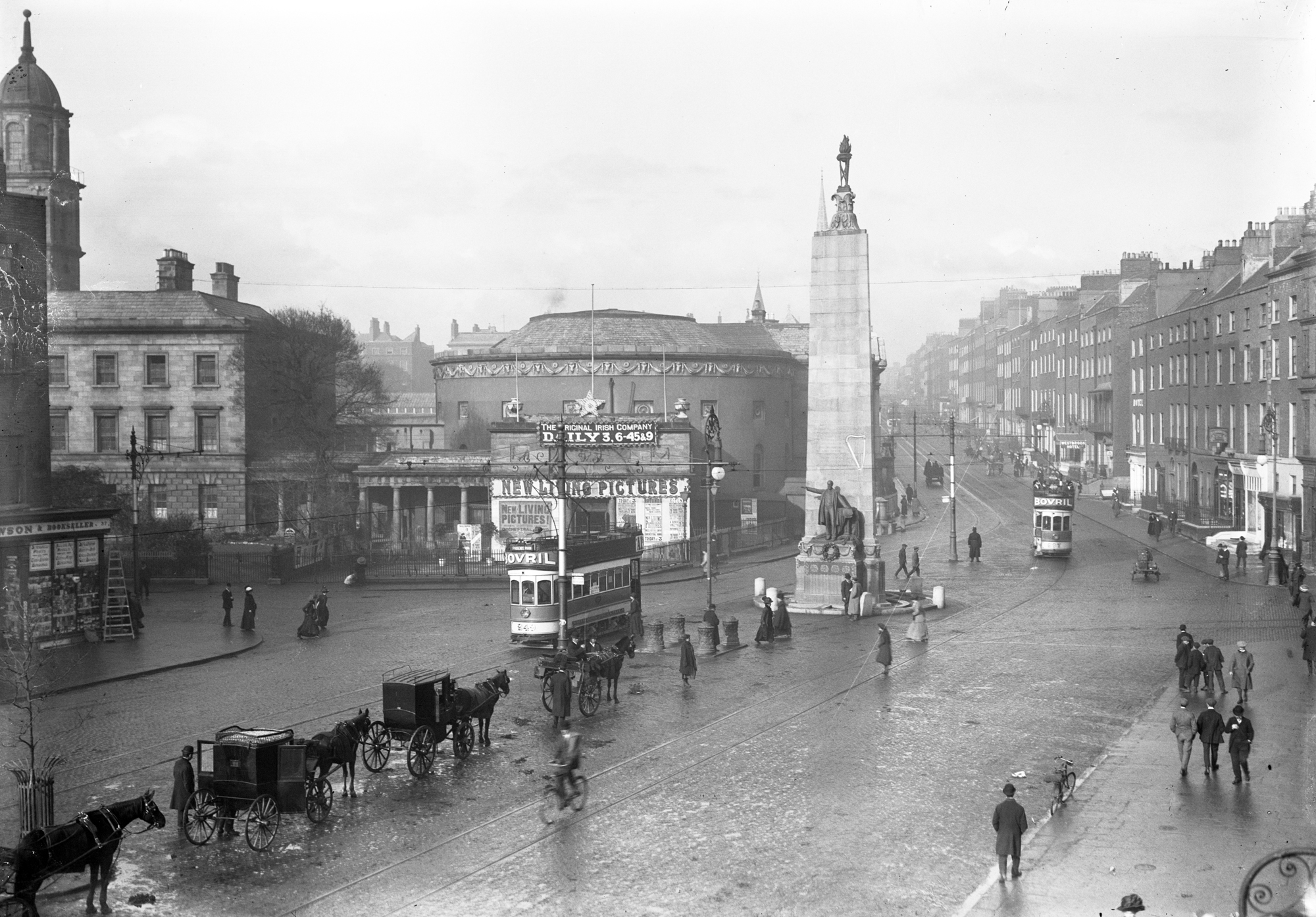
Dublin tramways running through Parnell Square and O'Connell Street in the early 20th century

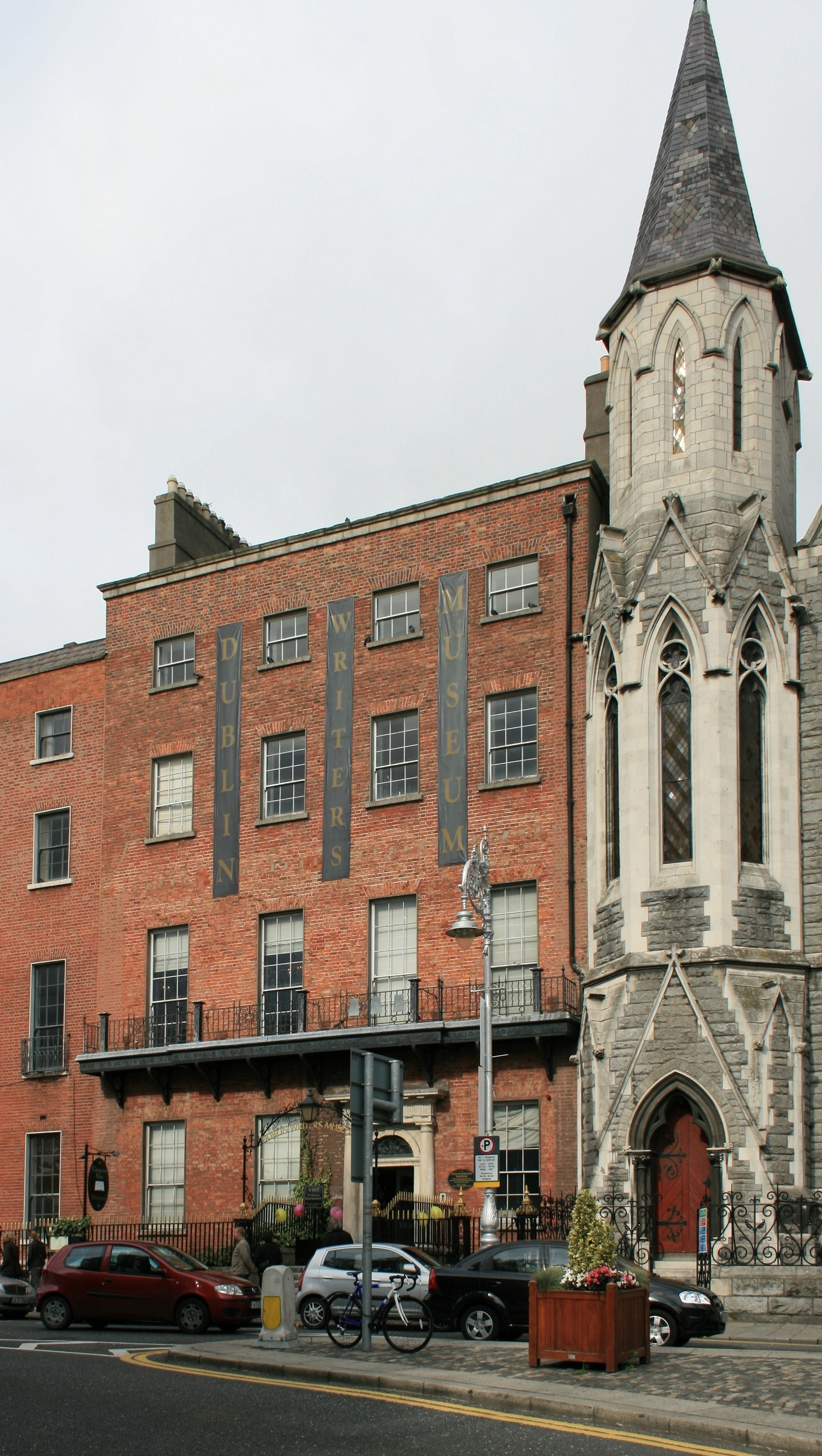
Dublin Writer's Museum

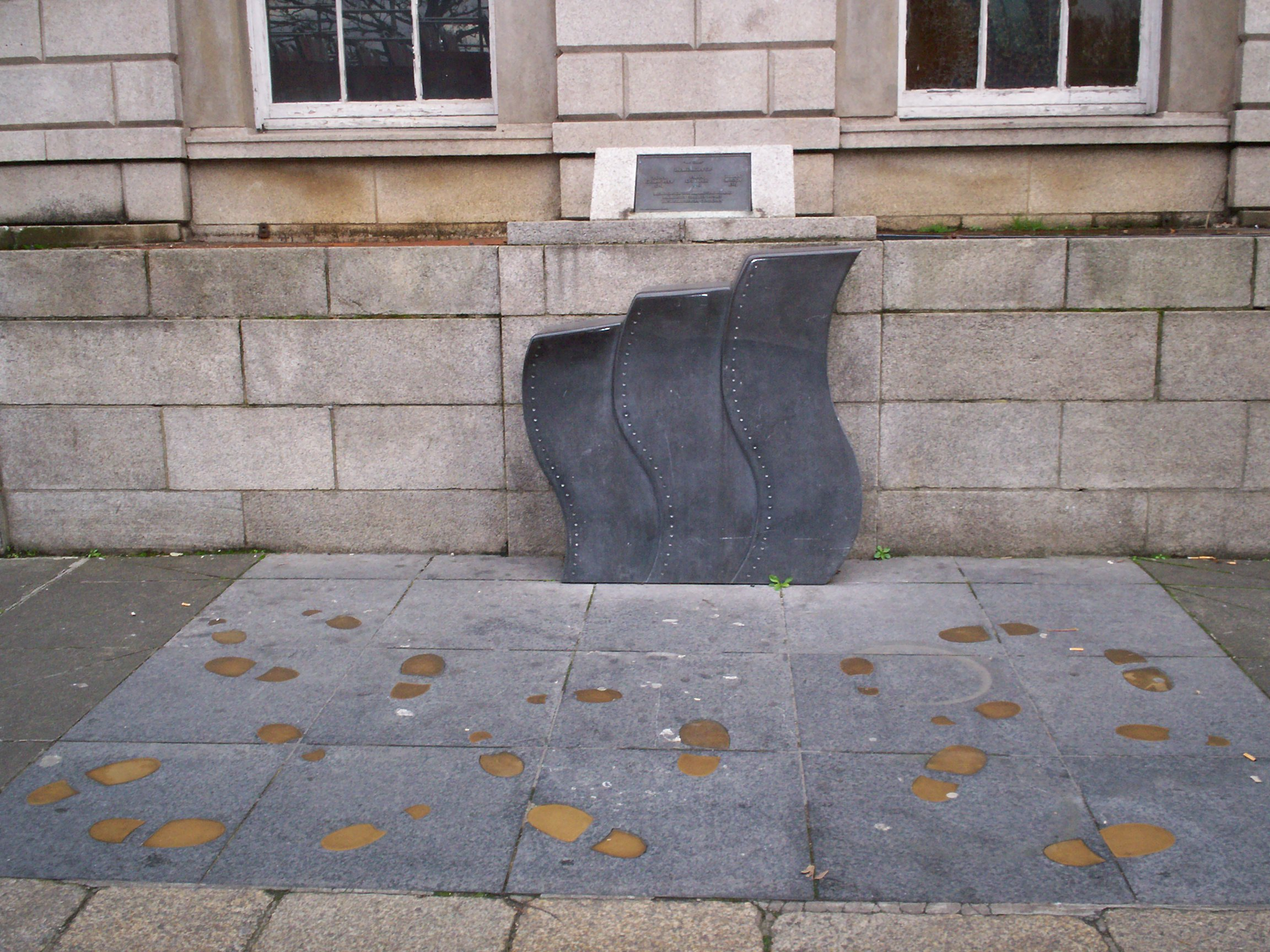
Let's Dance memorial to the Miami Showband killings on Parnell Square North

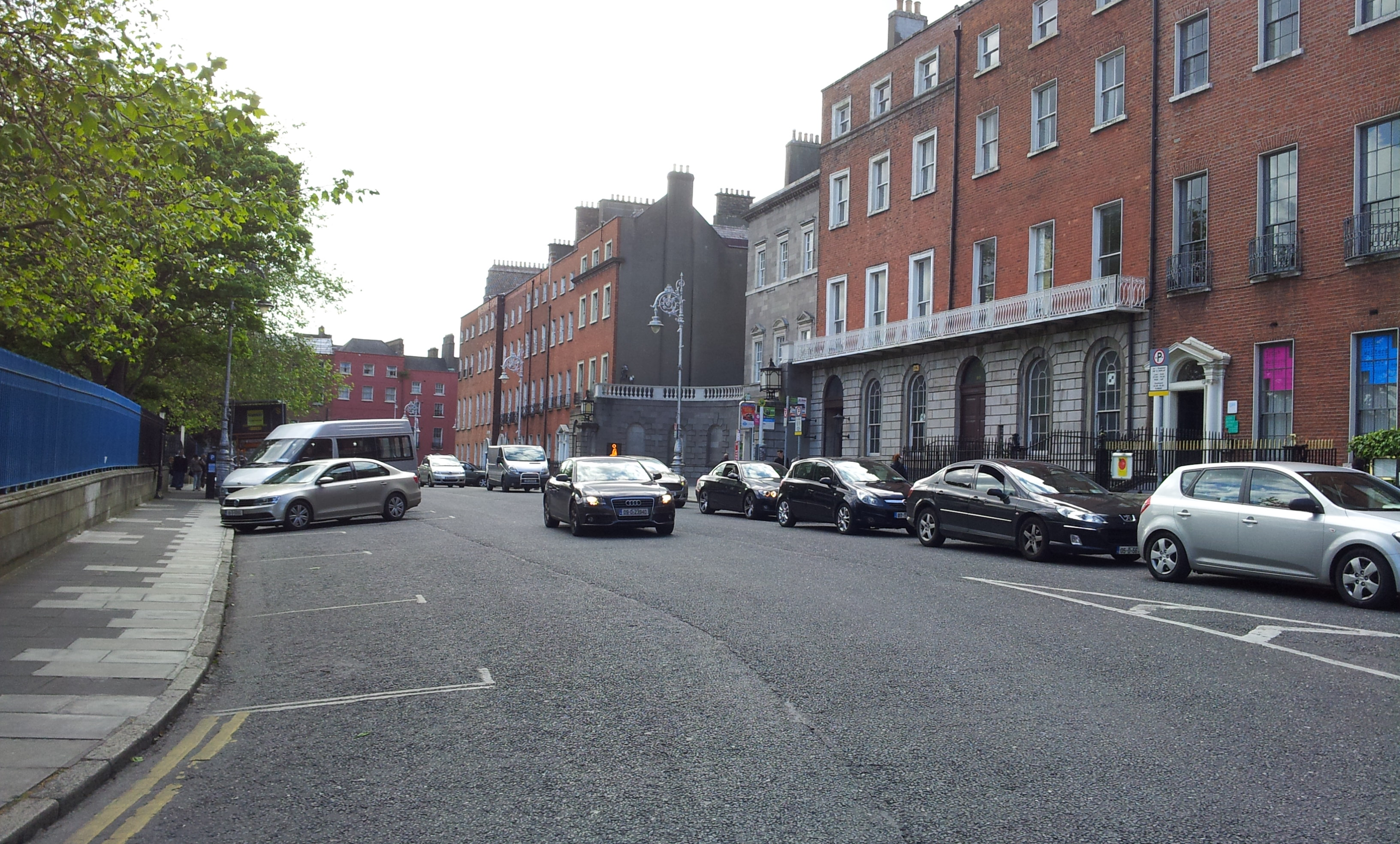
Northern side of Parnell Square, with the Garden of Remembrance at left, Hugh Lane Gallery recessed at right, and former Coláiste Mhuire buildings at far end

== People ==
- Richard Kirwan (1733–1812), geologist, lived on the square

== See also ==
- List of streets and squares in Dublin
