= Cavan General Hospital =

- Health Service Executive
- Shown in Ireland

Geography
- Location: Lisdarn, Cavan, County Cavan, Ireland
- Coordinates: 53.9994°N 7.3727°W

Organisation
- Care system: HSE
- Type: Regional

Services
- Emergency department: Yes
- Beds: 264

History
- Founded: 1989

Cavan General Hospital (Irish: Ospidéal Ginearálta an Chabháin) is a public hospital located in Cavan, County Cavan, Ireland. It is managed by RCSI Hospitals.

== History ==
The hospital was officially opened by Rory O'Hanlon, Minister for Health, in 1989.

== Services ==
The hospital provides 264 beds, of which 193 are in-patient acute beds, while 46 are reserved for acute day cases. A further 25 beds are for psychiatric services. It provides acute-care hospital services including a 24-hour emergency department.

== Transport and access ==
There are car parking areas located in the hospital grounds. The hospital is a short taxi journey or around 15–20 minutes on foot from the centre of Cavan. Leydons Coaches route 930 (Cavan-Ballyconnell-Enniskillen), Bus Éireann route 175 (Cavan-Cootehill-Monaghan) and Whartons Travel route 975 Longford-Arva-Cavan (operated on behalf of the National Transport Authority) provide public bus links to/from the hospital.
