= Ross Lewis (chef) =

Irish chef (born 1965)

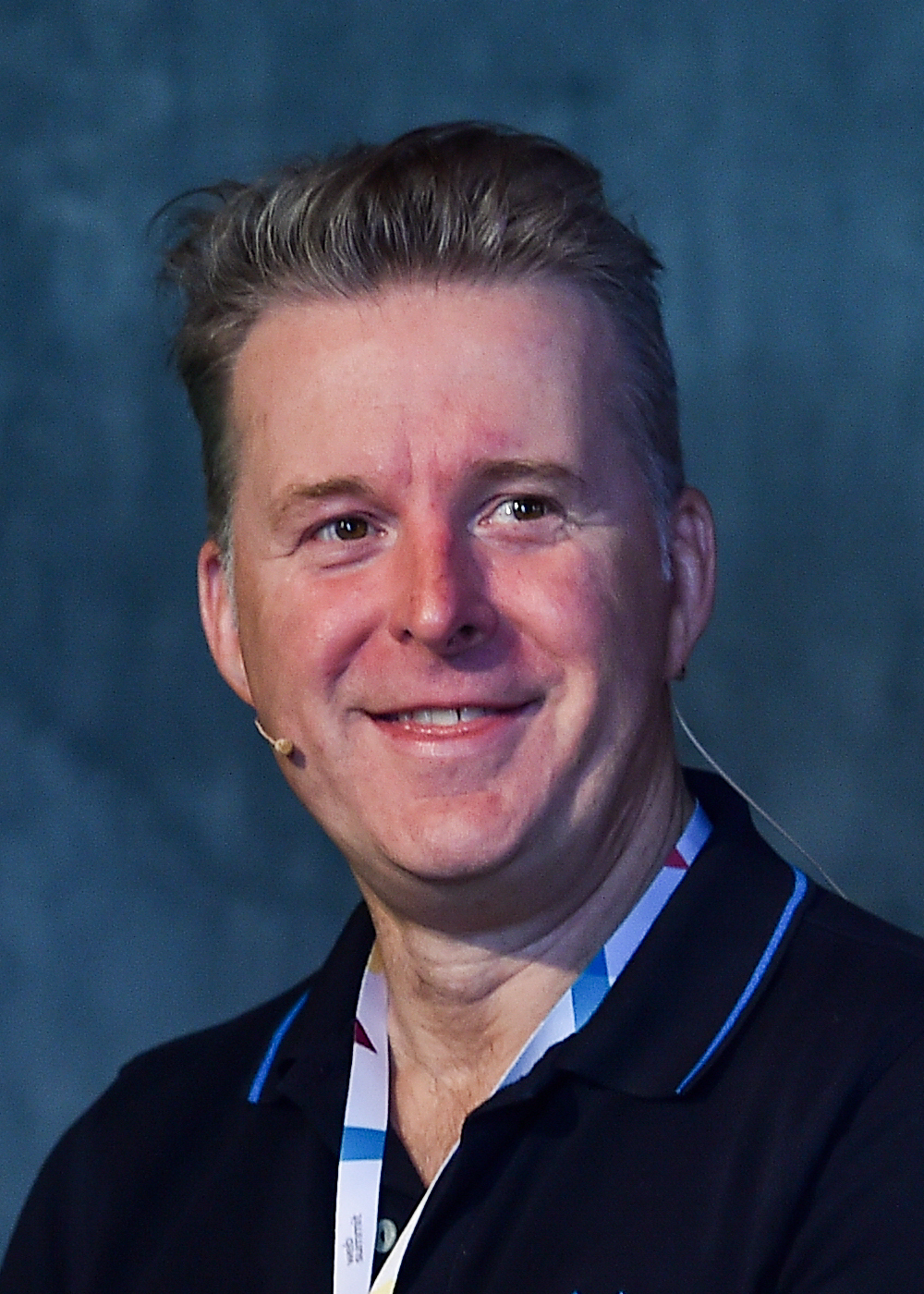
- Lewis in 2014
- Born: 1965 (age 60–61); Bishopstown, County Cork, Ireland
- Occupation: Chef
- Known for: Chapter One

Ross Lewis (born 1965 in Bishopstown) is an Irish Michelin-star-winning head chef and co-owner of the restaurant Chapter One.

Lewis grew up on a farm and went on to study Dairy Science at University College Cork. He discovered cooking as a living while working on a student visa in the United States. He later went to London to learn the trade of a chef. Through a schoolmate he found a job at the restaurant Odin's, owned by Peter Langan. From there he went on to Dolphin Brasserie as junior manager and to Le Chat Botté Restaurant at the Beau Rivage Hotel in Geneva, Switzerland. He came back in Ireland in 1990 and some time later took the chance of taking over Chapter One in the Dublin Writers Museum. The restaurant started trading in 1992.

Lewis also served three years (2001–2004) as Commissioner General of Eurotoques. In 2008-2011, he was a normal commissioner.

In 2011, he was the head chef for the State Banquet during the state visit of Queen Elizabeth II to Ireland.

== Festivals ==
Ross Lewis describes himself as a hands-on chef. He has participated in the following festivals:

- Taste of Dublin 2007-2011
- Front man for the first Taste of Cork Festival/EatCork Festival in 2008.
- Kinsale Food Festival 2008
- Chef at EatCork 2010
- Cookery demonstrations at Waterford Food Festival 2011
- Guest chef of Féile Bia na Mara 2011 (Achill Seafood Festival).

== Personal life ==
Ross Lewis is married and has three daughters. He lives in Seapoint.

== Awards ==
- Michelin Star, 2007–present
- RAI Award 2009
- Good Food Award 2006
