= Simpson's Hospital, Dublin =

Simpson's Hospital
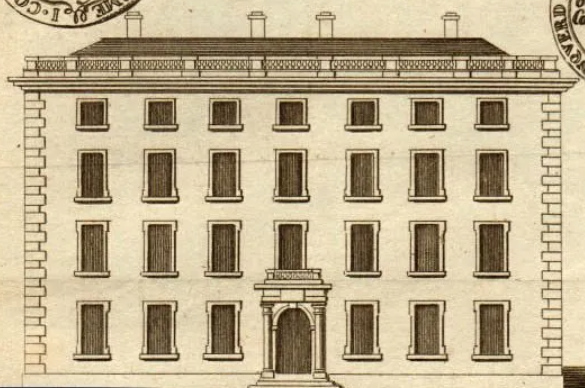
- Simpson's Hospital from an illustration of May 1785 in The Gentleman's Magazine.

Geography
- Location: Dundrum, Dublin, Ireland
- Coordinates: 53.2869°N 6.2488°W

Organisation
- Type: Specialist

Services
- Speciality: Care for the elderly

History
- Founded: 1779

Simpson's Hospital (Irish: Ospidéal Simpson) is a nursing home in Dundrum, Dublin, Ireland which was originally founded in 1779 through the endowment of George Simpson on Great Britain Street (now Parnell Street).

== History ==
Simpson's Hospital Estate Act 1779
- Act of Parliament
- Parliament of Ireland
- Long title: An Act for incorporating the Trustees of George Simpson Esquire's Hospital.
- Citation: 19 & 20 Geo. 3. (I)

Dates
- Royal assent: 19 August 1780

=== Great Britain Street (Parnell Street) ===
The hospital was founded under the terms of the will of George Simpson, a merchant who lived at 24 Jervis Street, Dublin around the time of his death in 1779. He suffered from blindness and gout. He devised his estate for the purpose of founding an asylum for blind and gouty men in reduced circumstances and inmates of the hospital were to be lodged, fed and clothed. He also provided for the care of his wife Catherine Simpson in her lifetime.

The trustees appointed were James Forbes, Travers Hartley, Thomas Read, Redmond Morris, Morgan Crofton, Edward Strettell, Jame Ford, The Reverend Doctor Robert Law, Allexander Jaffray, William Barton, Nevill Forth, Martin Brownley and Matthew Coleman along with his wife Catherine Simpson.

Money was also donated to the Blue Coat School, the Royal Hibernian Marine School, Incorporated Society for Promoting English Protestant Schools in Ireland, Mercer's Hospital and the Magdalene asylum on Leeson Street amongst other notable charitable institutions.

Around 1781, his ten trustees bought the large brick house of John Putland on Great Britain Street for £3,600, but it was found inconvenient as a hospital and was later demolished and replaced around 1784–87 by a new larger granite-clad building. In 1784 the inmates were removed to Judge Robinson's house in Jervis Street while the new hospital was being constructed.

Simon Vierpyl is recorded as having worked on the granite facade of the new building.

Historically the inmates of the hospital were said to have been an easily recognisable sight on the streets of Dublin wearing a uniform which consisted of a black felt top hat, a pilot blue suit and a walking cane.

The hospital later operated as the offices and factory of Williams and Woods sweet and jam manufacturers until it was sold in 1978 and demolished soon after to be replaced in the early 1990s by what is now Cineworld Dublin.

=== Dundrum hospital ===
In 1825 the hospital moved to a house known as Wyckham, its present location, in Dundrum. It continues to function as a nursing home for elderly people as of 2024.
