= Louth County Hospital =

- Health Service Executive
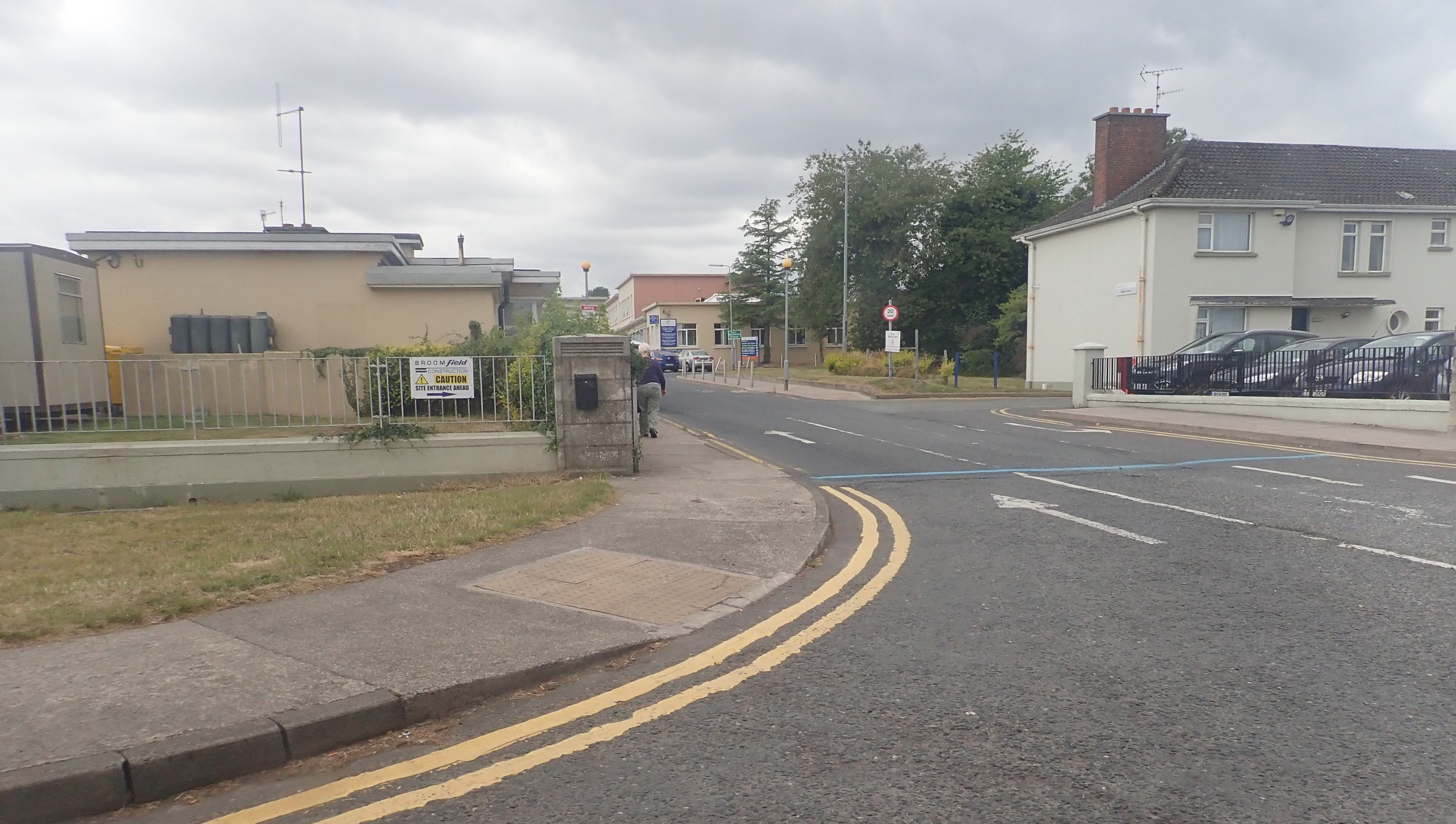
- Louth County Hospital

- Shown in Ireland

Geography
- Location: Dundalk, County Louth, Ireland
- Coordinates: 53.9880°N 6.4005°W

Organisation
- Care system: HSE
- Type: General

Services
- Beds: 142

History
- Founded: 1834

Links
- Website: www.hse.ie/eng/services/list/3/acutehospitals/hospitals/louthcounty/

Louth County Hospital (Irish: Ospidéal Chontae Lú) is a public hospital in Dundalk, County Louth, Ireland. It is managed by the RCSI Hospitals group within the Health Service Executive.

== History ==
The hospital has its origins in a building in the Crescent, which is now occupied by Dundalk Grammar School, and opened as the Louth Infirmary in 1834. The aging infirmary was replaced by a new facility in Dublin Road which was built at a cost of €500,000 and was officially opened on 3 July 1959. The accident and emergency department was replaced by a minor injuries unit in June 2010, despite years of campaigning by local people for it to be kept open.
