= King's Inns Street =

Street in Dublin, Ireland

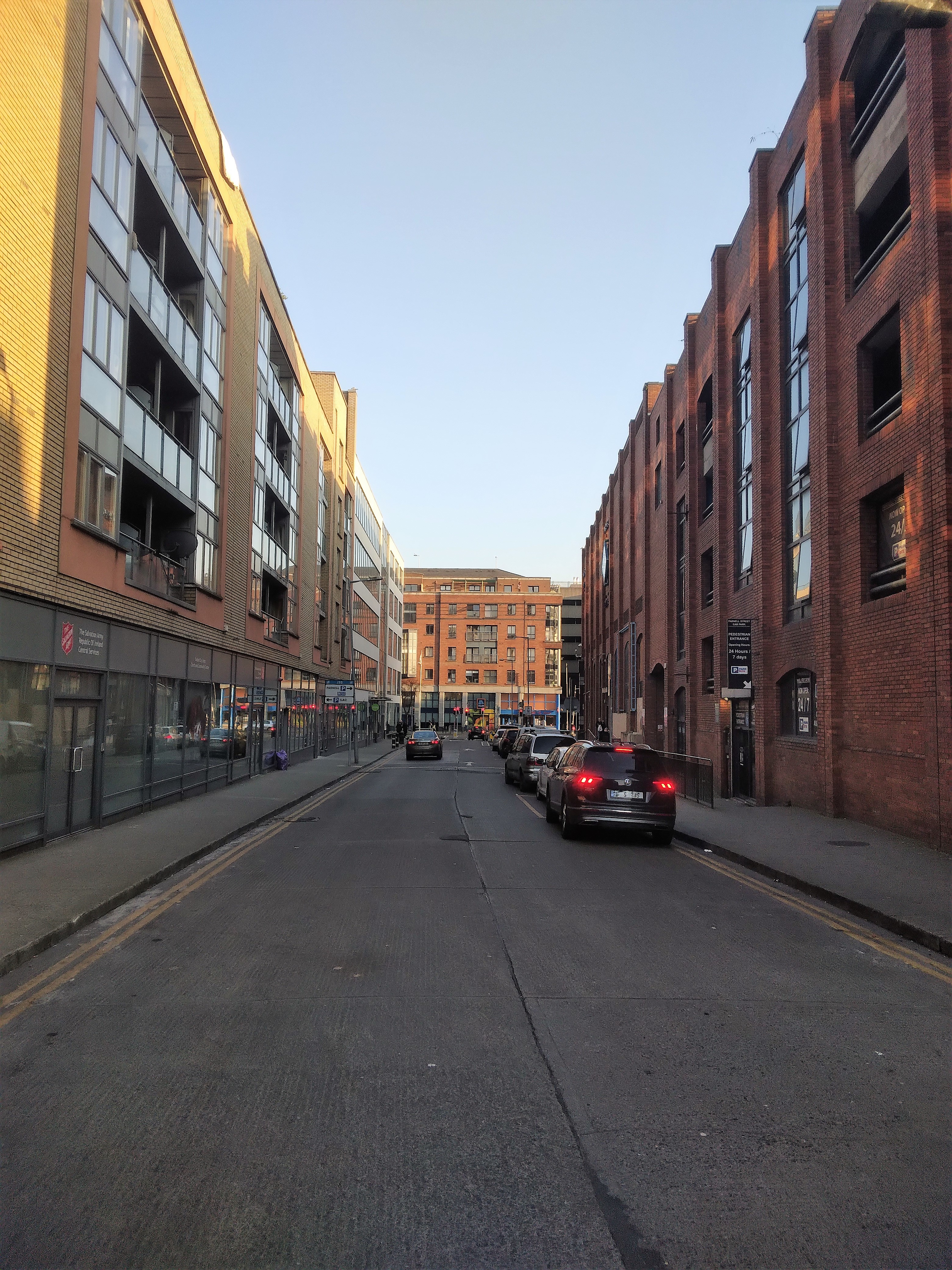
- King's Inns Street looking south towards Parnell Street
- Interactive map of King's Inns Street
- Native name: Sráid Óstaí an Rí (Irish)
- Former names: Turn Again Lane, Turnagain Lane
- Location: Dublin, Ireland
- Postal code: D07
- Coordinates: 53°21′05″N 6°16′02″W
- north end: Bolton Street
- Major junctions: Loftus Lane
- south end: Parnell Street

King's Inns Street (Irish: Sráid Óstaí an Rí) is a street in Dublin which connects Parnell Street to the south and Bolton Street to the north.

== History ==
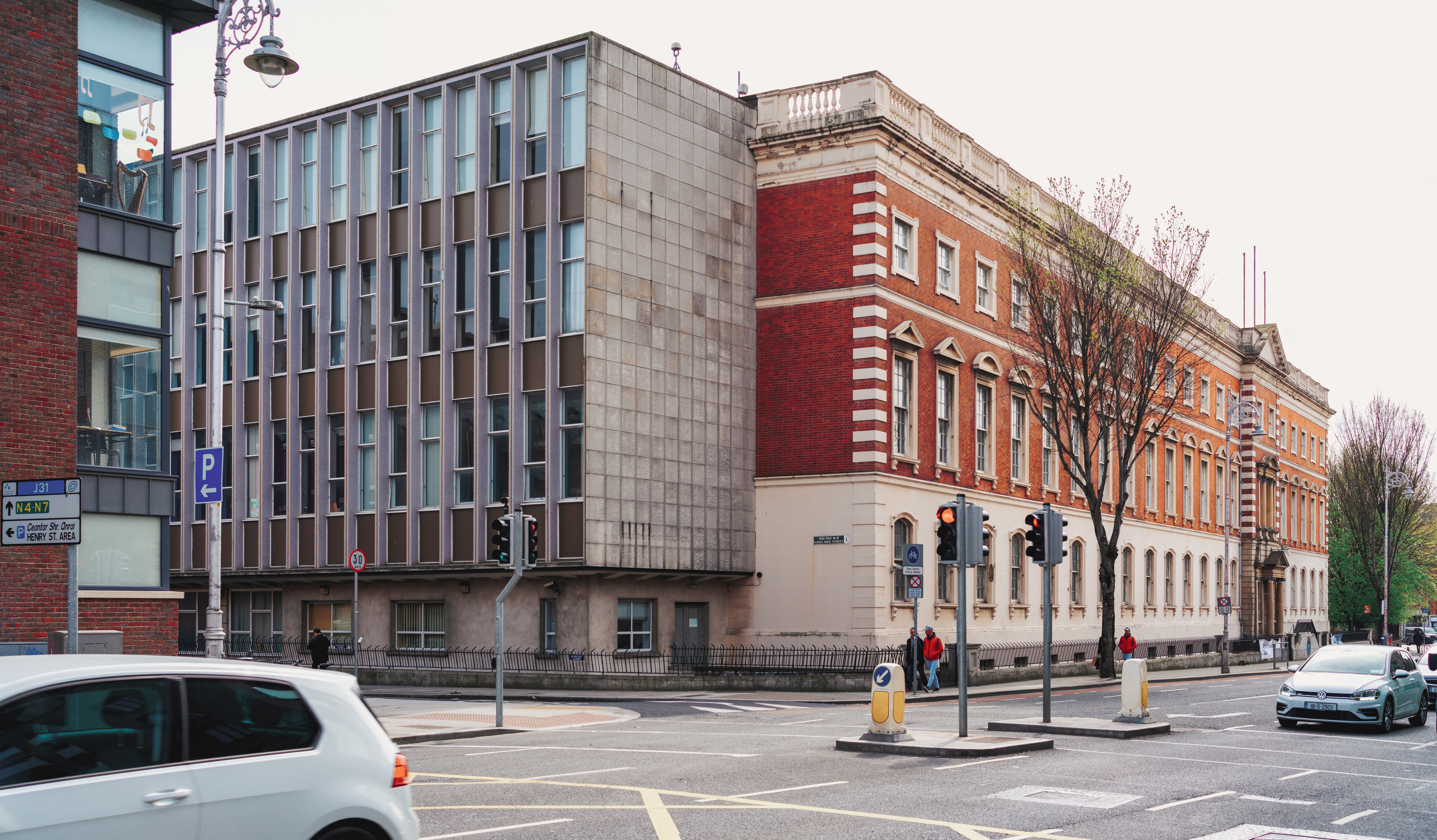
Former Dublin Institute of Technology (DIT), showing the 1961 extension

On the 1756 map of Dublin by John Rocque, King's Inns Street appears as Turn Again or Turnagain Lane. It was probably renamed due to its location near King's Inns on Henrietta Street, which opened in 1809. The name "turn again" supposedly derived from the curve in the centre of the street.

The western side of the street features the former Dublin Institute of Technology (DIT), now Technological University Dublin (TUD), the Art Deco Williams and Woods Ltd former jam factory, and eastern side of The Parnell Centre, with pedestrian access to a large multi-storey car park. The Williams and Woods factory now contains an arts centre, The Chocolate Factory. TUD Bolton Street's campus along King's Inns Street has two of extensions: the 1961 structure by Hooper and Mayne, and another designed by Gilroy McMahon Architects in 1987.

Facing TUD on the eastern side of the street is Mount Carmel National School, a 1930s school building designed by William H. Byrne & Son. The main entrance features carvings by Joseph O'Hanrahan.
