= Noyeks fire =

Fire in Dublin, Ireland in 1972

Noyeks Fire
- Date: 27 March 1972
- Location: Parnell Street, Dublin, Ireland; 53.35066°N 6.26623°W
- Type: Fire
- Cause: Floor Adhesive came in contact with gas heaters
- Deaths: 8

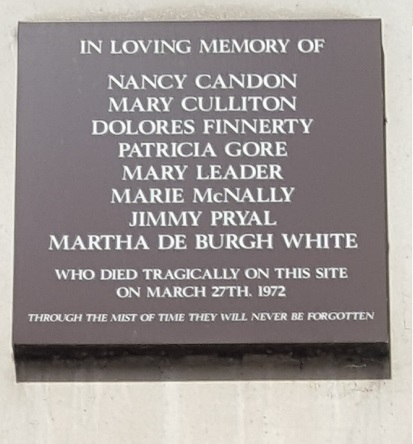
Noyeks Fire commemorative plaque located at the junction of Parnell Street and Kings Inns Street

The Noyeks fire was a fatal fire that took place at the Noyeks timber factory on Parnell Street, Dublin, Ireland on 27 March 1972, and claimed the lives of 8 people; seven women and one man who died in the inferno.

On the morning of the fire, the central heating was out of order and mobile gas heaters had been hired to provide heat. The fire is believed to have started when, on the Monday afternoon, a can of highly-flammable adhesive used to stick cork flooring was knocked over beside one of the heaters. The volatile fumes ignited and fire exploded into the three-story building.

RTÉ One aired a television programme, programme one of its Disasters series, about the Noyeks fire using archive footage with interviews of with eyewitnesses and relatives of the dead.
