= Monaghan Hospital =

Hospital in the town of Monaghan, County Monaghan, Ireland

- Health Service Executive
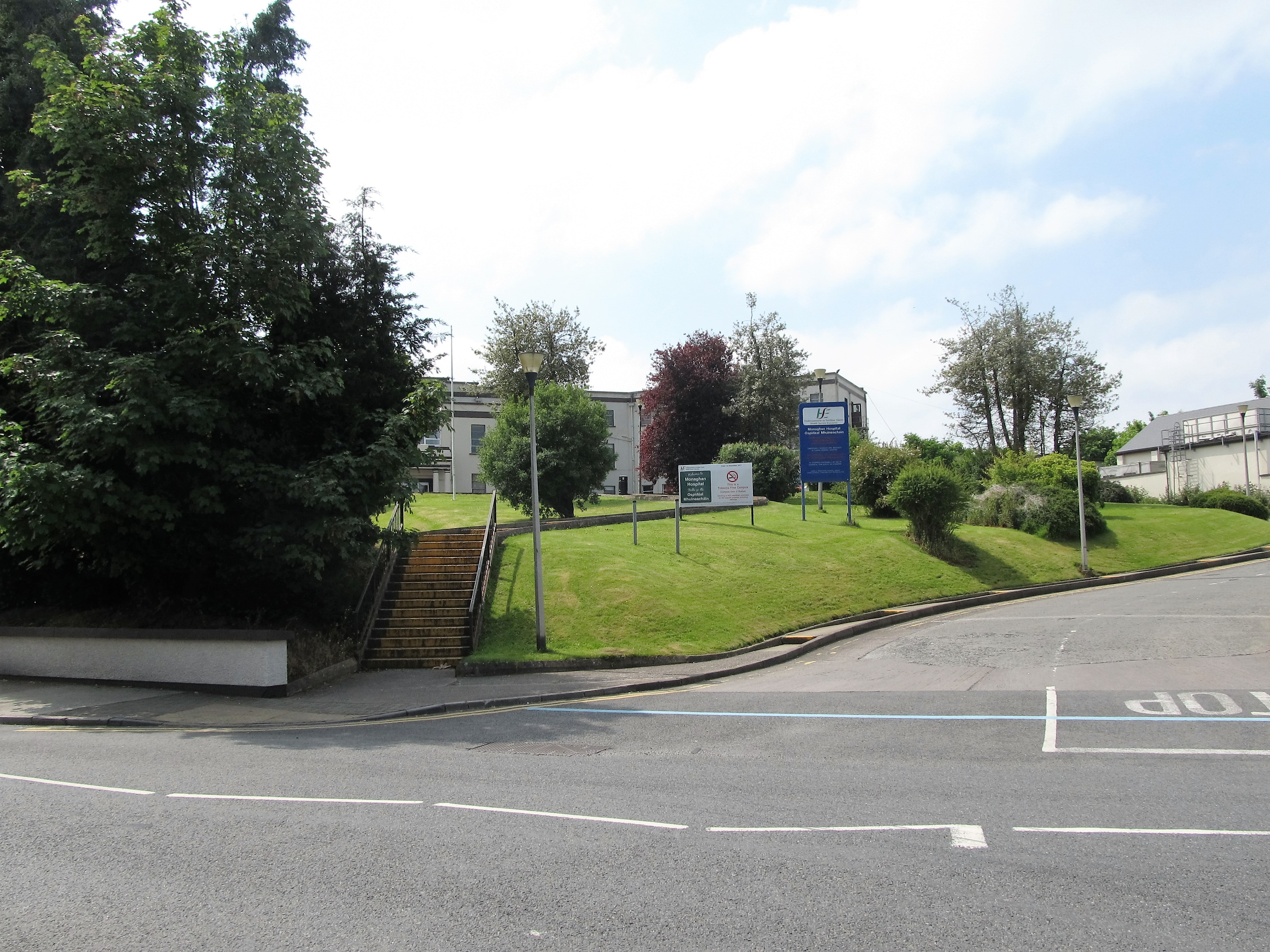
- Monaghan Hospital

- Shown in Ireland

Geography
- Location: Monaghan, County Monaghan, Ireland
- Coordinates: 54.2502°N 6.9744°W

Organisation
- Care system: HSE
- Type: Specialist

Services
- Emergency department: Yes
- Speciality: Rehabilitation

History
- Founded: 1896

Links
- Website: www.hse.ie/eng/services/list/3/acutehospitals/hospitals/cavanmonaghan/cavan-monaghan-hospital.html

Monaghan General Hospital (Irish: Ospidéal Mhuineacháin) is a hospital in the town of Monaghan, County Monaghan, Ireland.

== History and operations ==
The hospital has its origins in several of the former Monaghan County Jail buildings which were converted for clinical use as Monaghan Infirmary after purchase in the 1890s by a Board of Governors for a local medical facility. The first infirmary opened in 1896. The old main jail building was razed and the building of a new County Hospital commenced in 1933. The purpose-built hospital was officially opened on the site in 1938.

In 2006, the hospital's treatment room function was moved from a doctor-led to a nurse-led basis, with many cases to be handled at Cavan General Hospital thereafter. On 22 July 2009, all acute care ceased at Monaghan, with only day surgery and minor injury treatment to continue at the location, along with the provision of 13 "step-down" and 13 rehabilitation beds. The decision, which led to the redeployment of 130 staff, was opposed by local politicians, general practitioners, nurses and some consultants.

== Operations ==
Since the hospital ceased providing acute services in 2009, it has focussed on rehabilitation and "step-down" services. A minor injuries unit remains on the site, as do out-patient and day operations.

Monaghan Hospital is managed by one of the Health Service Executive's hospital groups, RCSI Hospitals, formerly the Dublin North-East Group, and the hospital and Cavan General Hospital are run as a single operation.
