= RCSI Hospitals =

Hospital group in ireland

RCSI Hospitals (Irish: Ospidéil RCSI, named after the Royal College of Surgeons in Ireland) is one of the hospital groups established by the Health Service Executive in Ireland.

== History ==
The grouping of hospitals was announced by the Irish Minister for Health, Dr. James Reilly TD in May 2013, as part of a restructure of Irish public hospitals and a goal of delivering better patient care. The Group was given responsibility for the following hospitals:

Northern Dublin

- Beaumont Hospital
- Connolly Hospital, Blanchardstown
- Rotunda Hospital

Other northern and eastern counties

- Our Lady of Lourdes Hospital, Drogheda
- Louth County Hospital
- Cavan General Hospital
- Monaghan Hospital

In July 2018, RCSI Hospitals announced a 12-year low in overcrowding.

== Services ==
The Group is headed by a Chief Executive, who is accountable to the National Director for Acute Services in the Health Service Executive, and is responsibility for delivering inpatient care, emergency care, maternity services, outpatient care and diagnostic services at its designated hospitals. The Group's designated cancer centre is Beaumont Hospital. The Group's academic partner is the Royal College of Surgeons in Ireland.
