= Ambassador Theatre (Dublin) =

Cinema in Dublin, Ireland

- Rotund Room; Ambassador Cinema
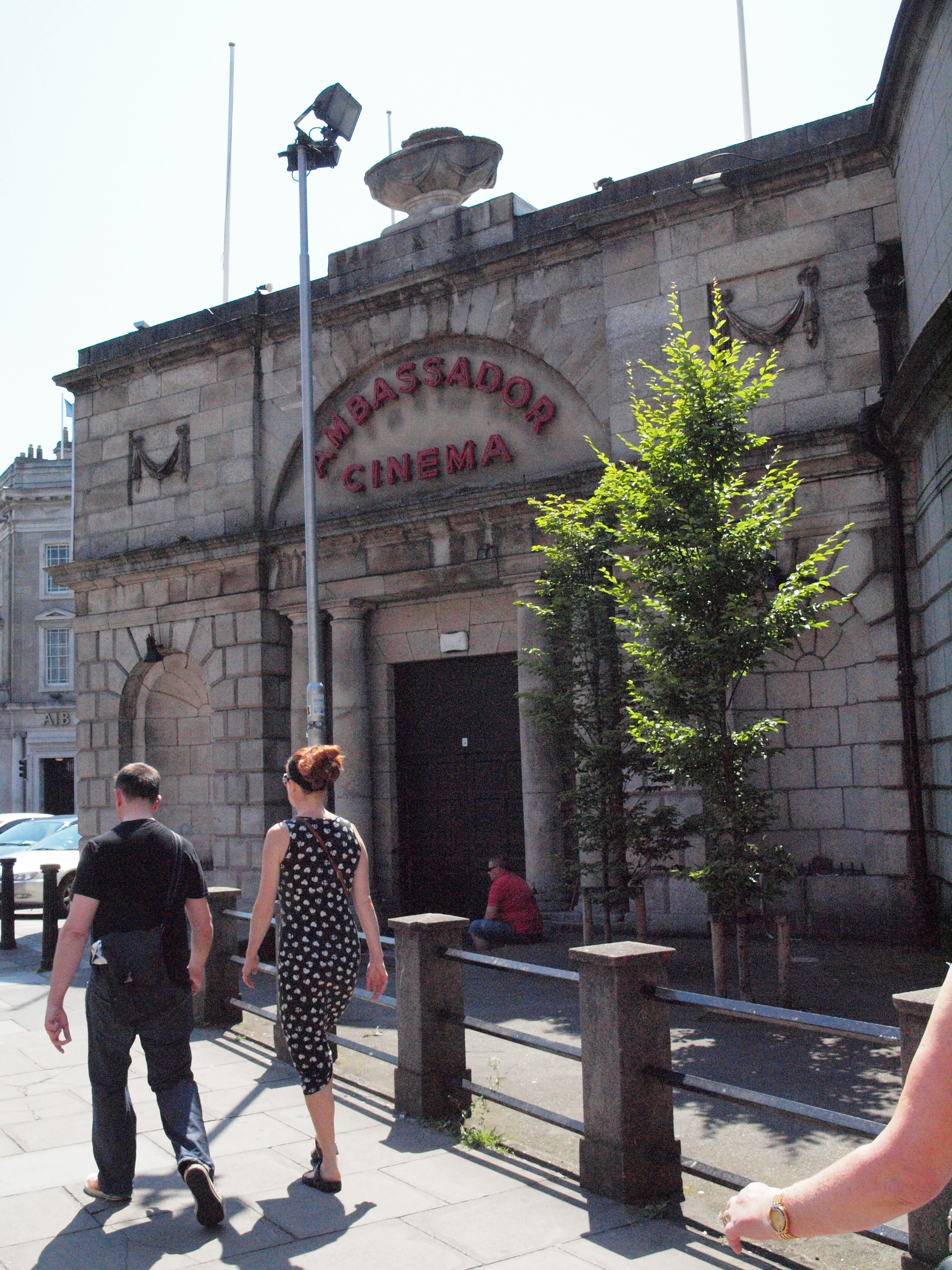
- Ambassador Cinema
- Interactive map of Ambassador Theatre
- Address: 165 Parnell Street; Dublin; Ireland
- Coordinates: 53.3527°N 6.2619°W
- Current use: Event and exhibition space

Construction
- Opened: 1764 (building); 1897 (as cinema)
- Closed: 1999 (as cinema)

The Ambassador Theatre, formerly Rotund Room, Rotunda, and Ambassador Cinema, was the longest-running cinema in Dublin, Ireland, and was operational on and off until 1999. It operated as a music venue between 2001 and 2008. As of 2024 it is used as an exhibition hall and event centre.

== History ==
The building was designed by John Ensor and constructed as part of the Rotunda Hospital in 1764 as an assembly hall and social rooms on what is now called Parnell Street. The entertainment complex was intended to raise funding for the hospital. The building is listed on the National Inventory of Architectural Heritage.

From 1897 onwards, the venue was given the name Rotund Room and hosted a number of moving picture screenings, which were a great novelty at the time. From about 1908 onwards, it was used more regularly to show film presentations and in 1910 it became a full-time cinema, with 736 seats, a basic layout at the time. Then known as the Rotunda, the cinema-going public thronged to the venue.

Over the years, it changed hands until the 1940s, when it was run by Capitol and Allied Theatres Ltd.

In the 1950s, the cinema was redesigned, increasing the capacity to 1,200. Added to the main hall was a balcony (containing 500 seats) with private boxes. A new entrance area was also constructed. The cinema was reopened on 23 September 1954 as the Ambassador. It became a gala event venue, holding screenings of many films for the first time. Of note was the screening of The Blue Max in 1966, which was shot in Ireland. For the screening, a World War I plane adorned the roof of the cinema above the entrance.

In 1977, the cinema was forced to close briefly, but it reopened that summer under new ownership. The Green Group ran the cinema until 1988, and it mainly played children's films such as The Care Bears Movie and its sequels. In 1988, with single-screen cinemas on the wane, it closed.

However, in 1994 it was given a new lease of life when it reopened under the ownership of Ward Anderson. Notable screenings upon reopening included Titanic, however, attendances were poor, most notably when a reissue of the 1935 film The Informer was screened to as few as two people per show. On 27 September 1999, after 45 years, the cinema closed.

This however was not the end of the venue. Entertainment promoters MCD Productions leased the building and for a number of years ran The Ambassador as a live music venue, until 2008. During this time, it was then as the Ambassador Theatre, although the sign simply said "Ambassador".

The Ambassador Theatre then hosted a variety of events, including exhibitions, one-off concerts, and corporate events. These included the Real Bodies exhibition in 2017, and Dinosaurs around the World in 2018.

The venue closed for three years during the COVID-19 pandemic in Ireland, reopening in late 2023.

== Current use ==
As of 2024 it is known as the Ambassador Theatre, but also includes signage on the building saying "The Ambassador Event Centre". It is used to host events and exhibitions.

== Exhibitions ==
- Body Worlds: Animal Inside Out - One of Gunther von Hagens's series of Body Worlds exhibitions that features plastinated animal sculptures of a spiny lobster, a sea snail, an octopus, a squid, a mako shark, a great white shark holding a sea lion in his mouth, a crocodile, a chicken, an ostrich, a duck, a rabbit, a cat, a cheetah, a tiger, a lion pouncing on an oryx from behind, a dog, a brown bear, a reindeer, a sheep, a goat, a cow, a bull, a yak, a bactrian camel, a giraffe, a horse, an asian elephant, a baboon, a gorilla, and a human, among others.
