= Rotunda Hospital =

- Health Service Executive - RCSI Hospitals
- Rotunda Hospital frontage on Parnell Street

- Shown in Dublin

Geography
- Location: Parnell Square East, Rotunda, D01 P5W9, Dublin, Ireland
- Coordinates: 53.3526°N 6.2626°W

Organisation
- Care system: HSE
- Type: Specialist
- Affiliated university: Royal College of Surgeons in Ireland; Dublin City University
- Patron: Bartholomew Mosse

Services
- Speciality: Maternity hospital

History
- Former name: Dublin Lying-In Hospital
- Founded: 1745; 281 years ago

Links
- Lists: Hospitals in the Republic of Ireland

The Rotunda Hospital (Irish: Ospidéal an Rotunda; legally the Hospital for the Relief of Poor Lying-in Women, Dublin) is a maternity hospital on Parnell Street in Dublin, Ireland, now managed by RCSI Hospitals. The eponymous Rotunda building, which is located immediately beside the original hospital, is no longer part of the medical complex.

== History ==
=== George's Lane ===
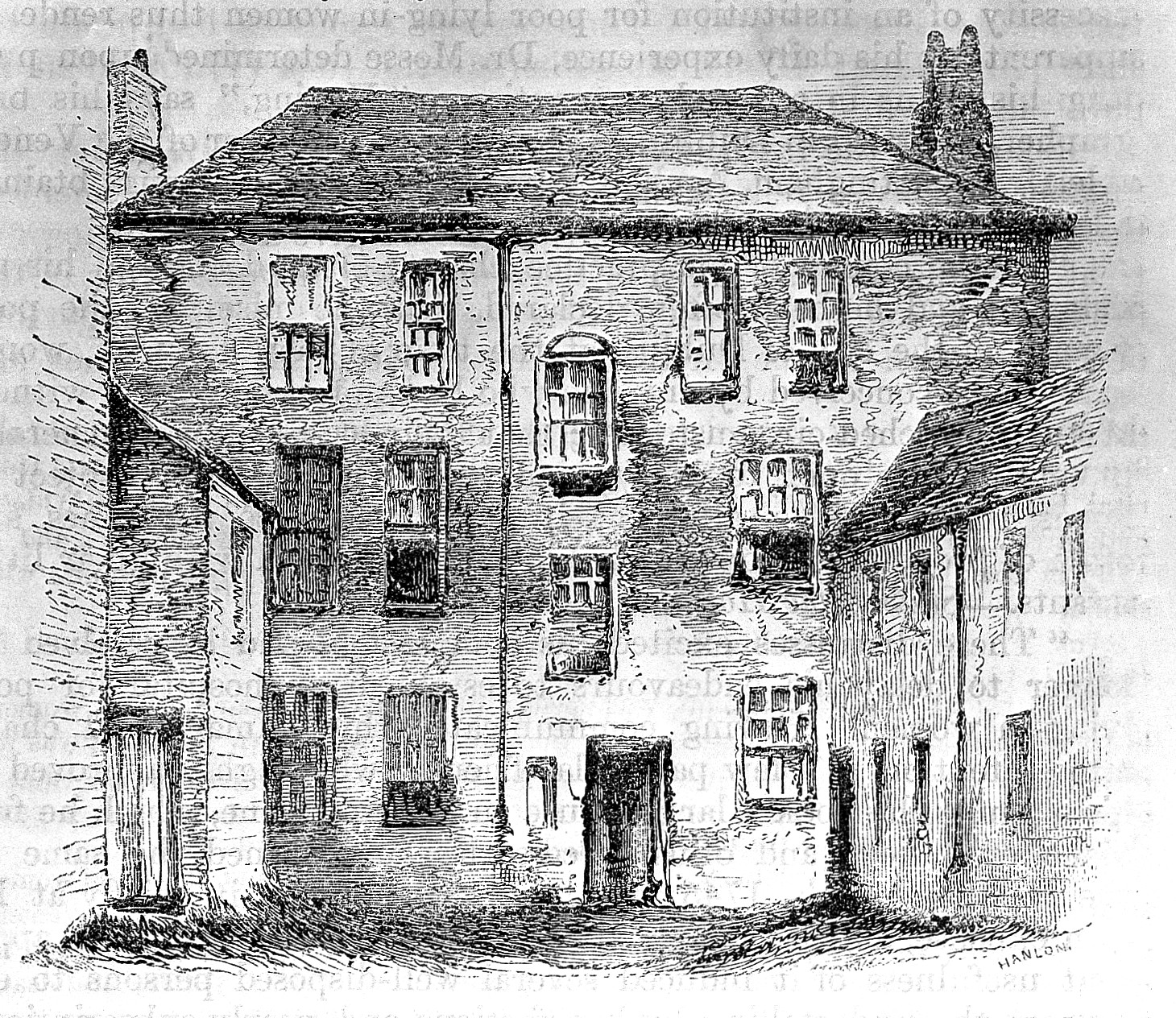
The original lying-in hospital at 59 South Great George's Street.

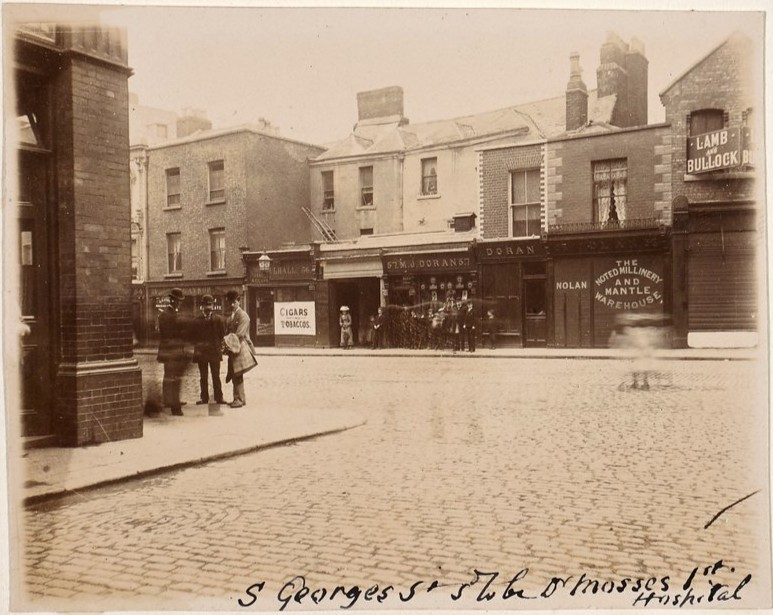
Facing towards the former hospital on South Great George's Street from Fade Street c1893

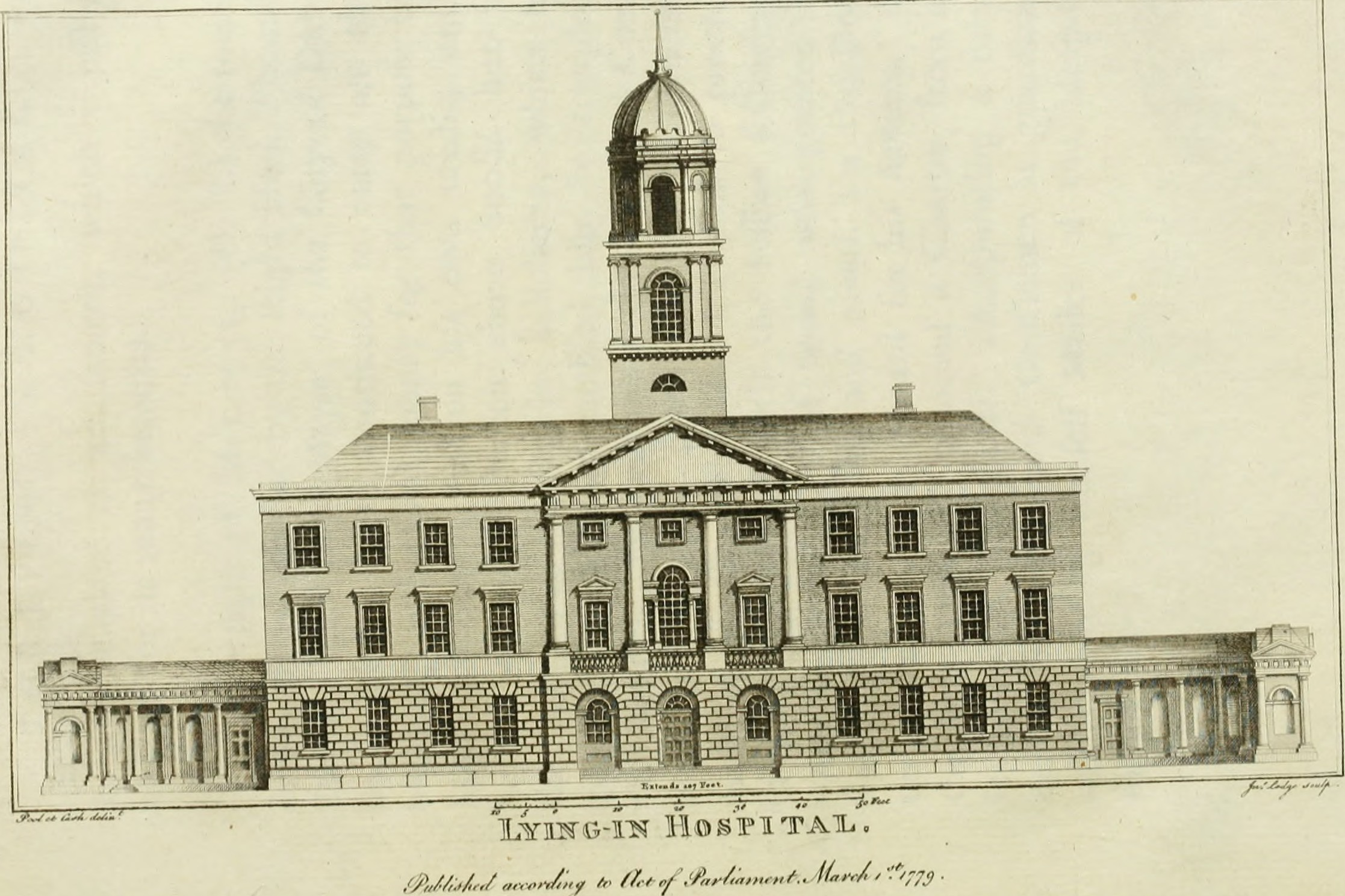
The Rotunda Hospital in 1780

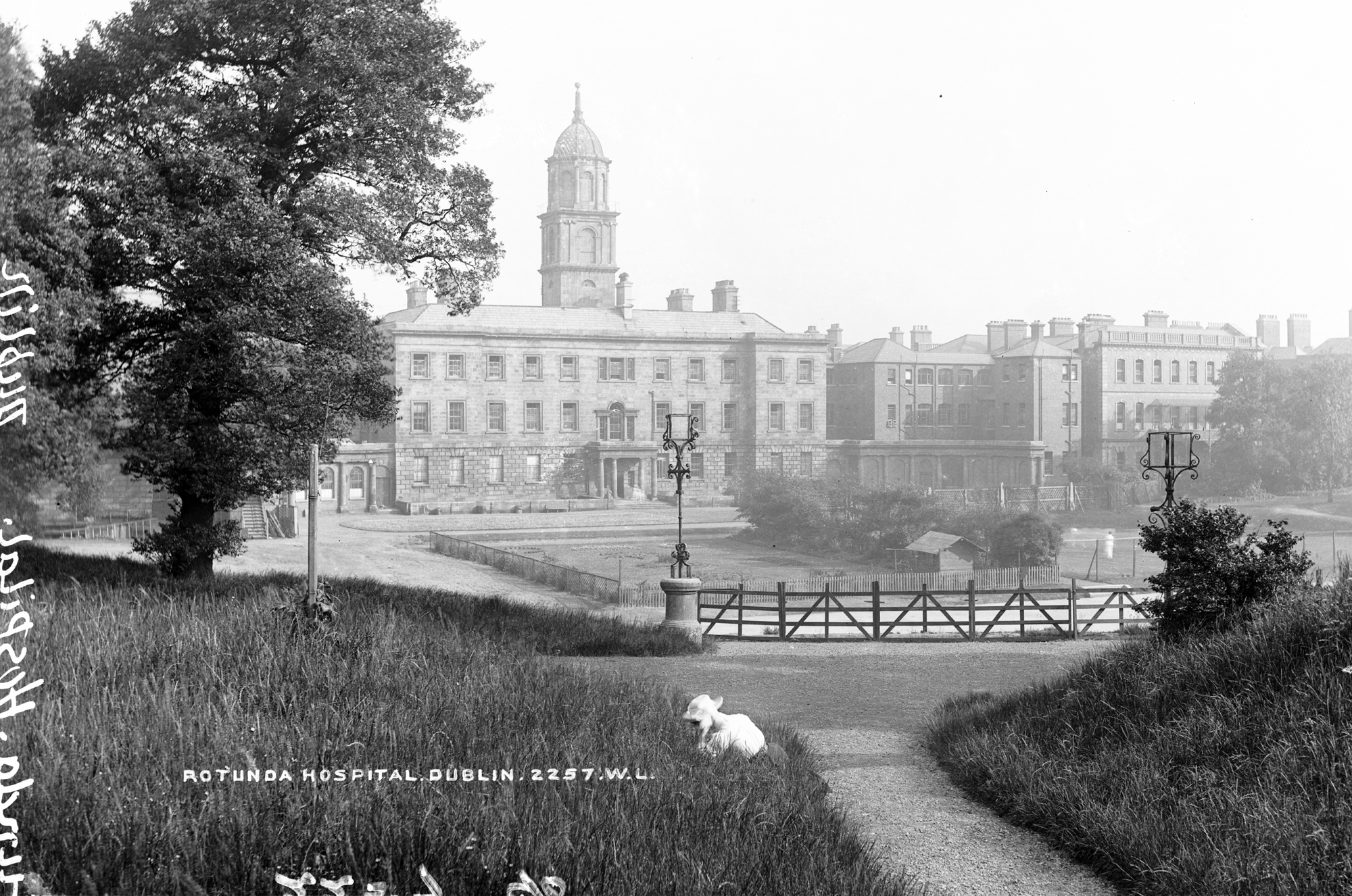
Back of the hospital, showing tennis courts. ca. 1890s

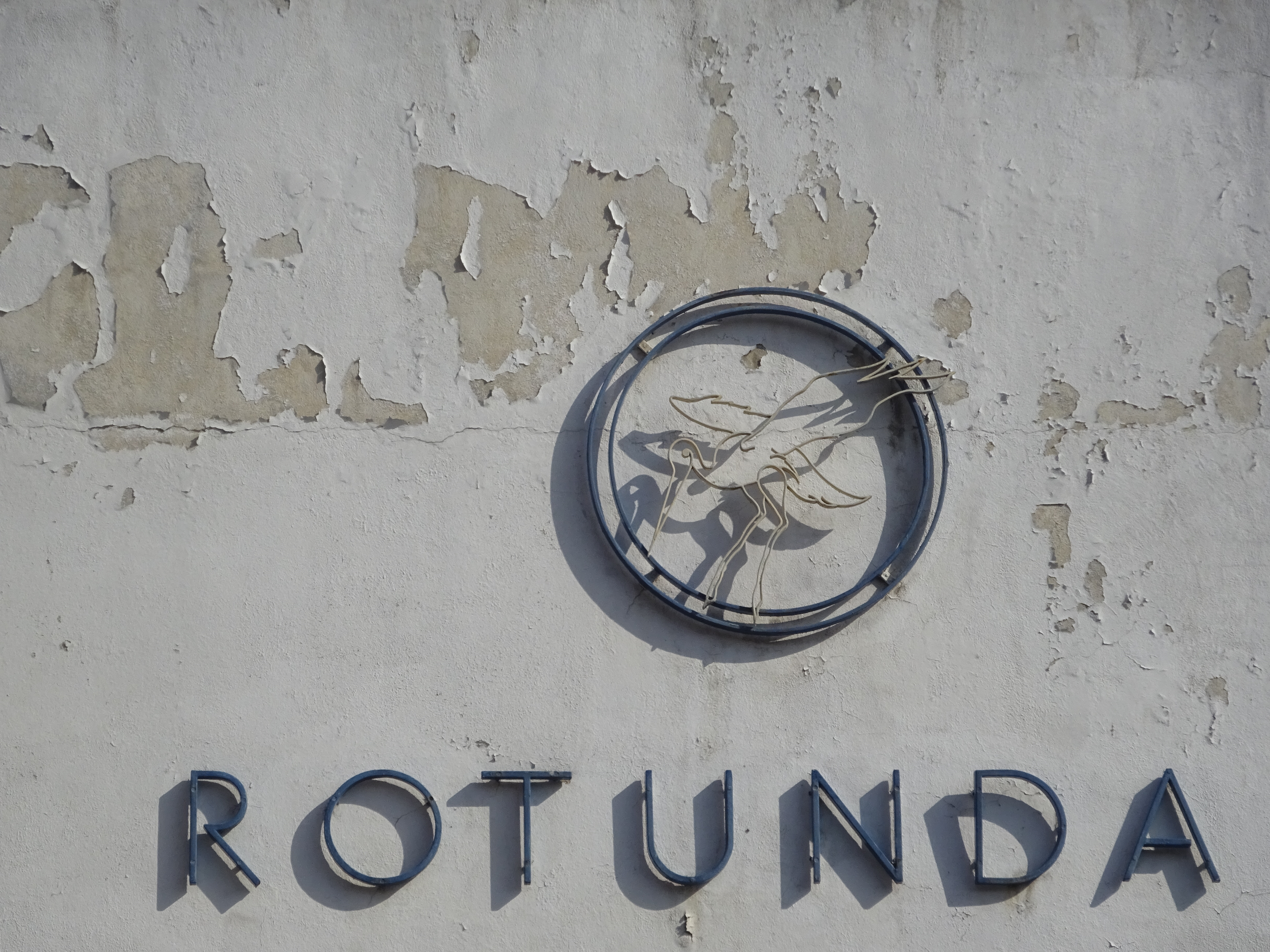
Sign on the Rotunda hospital, with a neon light image of a stork

The hospital was founded by Bartholomew Mosse, a surgeon and midwife who was appalled at the conditions that pregnant women had to endure, in George's Lane in March 1745. It was granted by royal charter on 2 December 1756 by King George II. Lying-in is an archaic term for childbirth (referring to the month-long bed rest prescribed for postpartum confinement). The venture was very successful and Mosse raised money through concerts, exhibitions and even a lottery to establish larger premises.

=== New Gardens (Parnell Square) ===
The foundation stone of the new hospital was laid on 24 May 1751 on the site of the New Gardens on current day Parnell Square. The hospital moved into the building in 1757, designed by Richard Cassels, where it became known as "The New Lying-In Hospital". The Church of Ireland chapel was opened in 1762. Open to the public, it provided a healthy income to the hospital annually, Dr. Mosse successfully encouraging wealthy Protestant Dubliners to attend service there.

Records indicate that around 1781, "when the hospital was imperfectly ventilated, every sixth child died within nine days after birth, of convulsive disease; and that after means of thorough ventilation had been adopted, the mortality of infants, within the same, in five succeeding years, was reduced to one in twenty". This issue was not limited to the Lying-In-Hospital. In that era, ventilation improvement was a general issue in patient care, along with other issues of sanitation and hygiene, and the conditions in which surgeons such as Robert Liston and nurses and campaigners like Florence Nightingale in Britain and elsewhere, had to operate.

The first caesarean section in Ireland was undertaken at the hospital in 1889.

=== Rotunda and Assembly Rooms ===
The eponymous Rotunda, designed by James Ensor, was completed just in time for a reception hosted by James FitzGerald, Marquess of Kildare in October 1767. A frieze, blocking course and cornice were added to the original plain appearance in 1787. By the early 19th century the hospital had become colloquially known as the Rotunda Hospital, after this prominent architectural feature. The Rotunda became a theatre, where the Irish Volunteers' first public meeting was held in 1913, and later housed the Ambassador Theatre.

The extensive Rotunda Assembly Rooms, designed by Richard Johnston between 1784-86 and built adjacent to the Rotunda on Cavendish Row, were completed in 1791. The idea for the initial design was said to come from Frederick Trench, likely with some later modifications by James Gandon. The Rotunda Rooms now house the Gate Theatre.

== Architecture ==
Patrick Wyse Jackson, curator of the Geological Museum in Trinity College, assessed the building in 1993 as part of his book "The Building Stones of Dublin: A Walking Guide" with the following remarks:

The walls of the current building dating from 1757 are faced with Leinster granite and Kilgobbin granite... The former building was executed in Portland stone and Leinster granite, to which a sculptured frieze of ox heads and other panels were added. These are interesting as they are made of Coade stone, a fashionable artificial stone used widely in the late 1700s.

== Services ==
The Rotunda Hospital, as both a maternity hospital and also as a training centre (affiliated with Trinity College Dublin) is notable for having provided continuous service to mothers and babies since inception, making it the oldest continuously operating maternity hospital in the world. In 2025, the total number of babies born at the hospital increased to more than 900,000 since it opened its doors.

== Criticism ==
In 2000 the Rotunda Hospital was one of two Dublin maternity hospitals found to have illegally retained organ tissue from babies without parental consent. The tissue removed in post-mortem examinations was retained for some years. The Rotunda hospital admitted that permission should have been sought for this process to be allowed to take place.

A medical negligence award was approved in 2020 for a young boy who developed cerebral palsy as a result of complications with his delivery at the hospital in 2004.

== See also ==
- General Lying-In Hospital, London
