= Ross Lewis (photographer) =

American photographer (born 1943)

Ross D. Lewis
- Born: 1943 (age 82–83); Passaic, New Jersey, U.S.
- Occupation: Fine arts photographer
- Website: ross-lewis.pixels.com

Ross David Lewis is an American photographer known for his extraordinary imagery and photographs of the National Football League between 1972 and 1984. Ross began his photography with the NFL in 1972 with his extensive national photographs for "The Pro Football Experience" book published by Harry N. Abrams. Ross was acknowledged in the New York Times book review for his photography on this special project. Later, Ross was a major photographic contributor to "The Game of Passion", produced by the NFL and to "GameDay" and "PRO Magazine" which were published and distributed to NFL Stadiums throughout the United States.

Additionally, Ross David Lewis, during his 22-year professional career, was selected by Fortune 500 corporations to photograph domestic and international projects throughout the United States, Africa, Brazil, Europe and Canada. Prior to his photography career, Ross graduated from Rutgers University in 1965 and, following his service as a U.S. Army Officer in South Korea, Ross was an associate director of nightly news broadcasts for WCBS-TV, New York. Between 1993 and 2010 Ross created and was President of "S.E.E", Special Eyes On The Environment". "S.E.E" was a powerful and inspiring educational environmental photography program for hundreds of special-education children throughout the state of New Jersey. In year 2000, "S.E.E." was exhibited in two Washington, D.C. rotundas during a special event which honored the children, their photography and their contributions to the world to elevate environmental consciousness and actions in the United States.

Currently Ross is working on a multi-tiered enterprise, "Yankee Stadium Forever" (his self-generated photographic project of 13,000+ photographs of the demolition and rebirth of the original Yankee Stadium between 1973 and 1976). Website: yankeestadiumforever.net

- Official website
