= Parnell Street =

Street in North Dublin city, Ireland

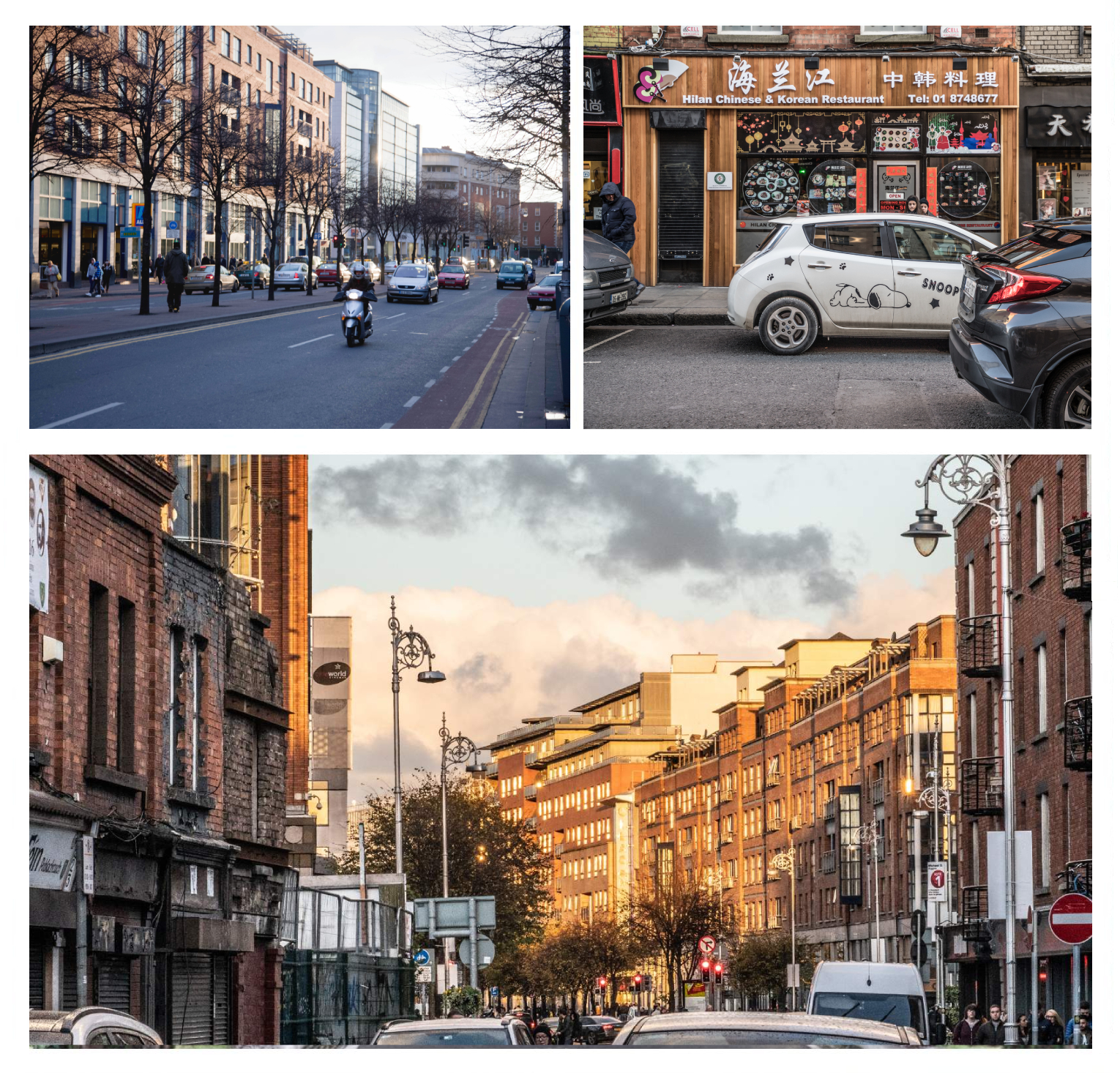
- Parnell Street is a major artery in central Dublin. It is home to the city's unofficial Chinatown and Koreatown
- Interactive map of Parnell Street
- Native name: Sráid P(h)arnell (Irish)
- Former name: Great Britain Street
- Namesake: Charles Stewart Parnell
- Length: 1.0 km (0.62 mi)
- Width: Up to 32 metres (105 ft)
- Location: Dublin, Ireland
- Postal code: D01
- Coordinates: 53°21′09″N 6°15′42″W
- west end: Capel Street
- east end: Gardiner Street, Summerhill

Other
- Known for: Rotunda Hospital; Ambassador Theatre; Gate Theatre; Ilac Centre

Parnell Street (Irish: Sráid Pharnell) is a street in Dublin, Ireland, which runs from Capel Street in the west to Gardiner Street and Mountjoy Square in the east. It is at the north end of O'Connell Street, where it forms the south side of Parnell Square.

== History ==
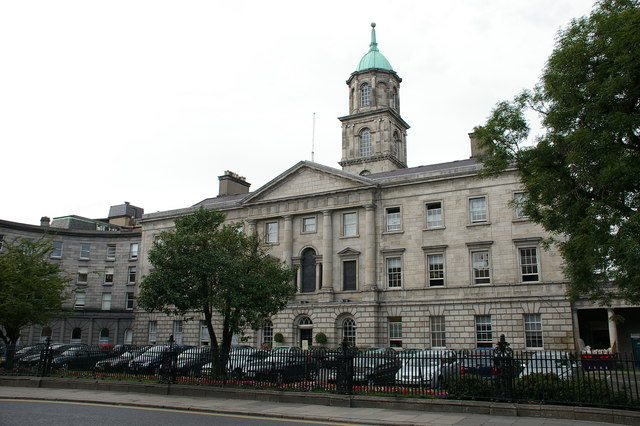
Rotunda Hospital, Parnell Street

Prior to the 18th century, Parnell Street was part of the ancient road connecting the old city to the northern coast, with Father Mathew Bridge connecting Church Street and Wood Quay in the east, to Ballybough and Fairview in the west.

=== 18th century ===
During the 18th century, the development of Amiens Street and Annesley Bridge provided a new coast road, and Parnell Street and its continuation to the east, Summerhill, became home to Georgian architecture. Prominent Georgian buildings on the street include the Rotunda Hospital, the Ambassador Theatre and the Gate Theatre while previously the street also included Simpson's Hospital and the Damer Institute.

In 1748, Bartholomew Mosse bought land from William Naper on Parnell Street to construct the Rotunda Hospital.

Around the same time, fashionable Georgian streets were developed radiating from the street including most notably Dominick Street and North Great George's Street and later Gardiner Street.

=== 19th century ===
In the 19th century, the street continued to develop as a mainly commercial area with prominent businesses established on the street such as St Peter's Bakery towards the end of the century near Gardiner Street and Mooney's pub opposite the Rotunda hospital.

=== 20th century ===
The Parnell Monument was constructed at the junction of Parnell Street and O'Connell Street in 1906-07. Formerly Great Britain Street, the street was renamed after Charles Stewart Parnell when Dublin Corporation adopted a resolution on 1 October 1911, after the unveiling of the statue to Parnell on the street as it meets O'Connell Street. The statue was created by Irish-American sculptor Augustus Saint-Gaudens. Saint-Gaudens stated that "I wish to make the Parnell Monument the crowning work of my life."

The Noyeks fire tragedy occurred on the corner of the street and King's Inns Street in 1972 killing 8 people.

The western end of Parnell Street was substantially redeveloped from the end of the 20th century up to 2008. The urban regeneration came after road plans by Dublin Corporation devastated the street in the 1970s with wholesale demolition of buildings when it was scheduled to be part of the Inner Tangent Road scheme, causing widespread dereliction. A significant portion of the original Georgian and Victorian architecture was destroyed, with numerous houses demolished and subsequently replaced mostly by apartment buildings. The street was developed into a dual-carriageway with an island in the middle of parts of the street.

The Ilac Centre opened in 1981 with an entrance onto Parnell Street is the oldest shopping centre in the city. The construction of the centre involved the wholesale demolition of hundreds of buildings and many streets and laneways including the disappearance of prominent connecting streets such as Little Denmark Street.

=== Regeneration ===
Moore Street Mall also has an entrance on Parnell Street. Cineworld (UGC) cinema on Parnell Street is the largest cinema in Ireland, with 17 screens. The street also has an Aldi supermarket and a wide variety of modern international and specialist ethnic retail.

A Stringfellow's restaurant and strip club operated on Parnell Street for a number of months before closing because of poor trading performance. Various residents' associations, women's groups and Christian groups had campaigned against it, and its demise has been linked to those protests.

The eastern end of Parnell Street, having remained comparatively undeveloped, is now home to a thriving immigrant community. The proliferation of Chinese and Korean restaurants has lent the east side the reputation of being Dublin's Chinatown. One of the first people to open a Chinese restaurant in Dublin, William Wong, stated it was an Irish missionary Dominican nun who encouraged him to emigrate to Ireland with his family. There is also a significant presence of African and East and Central European businesses at the eastern end.

== See also ==
- List of streets and squares in Dublin
