= Dublin Writers Museum =

Private literary museum on Parnell Square, Dublin

- Músaem na Scríbhneoirí, Baile Átha Cliath
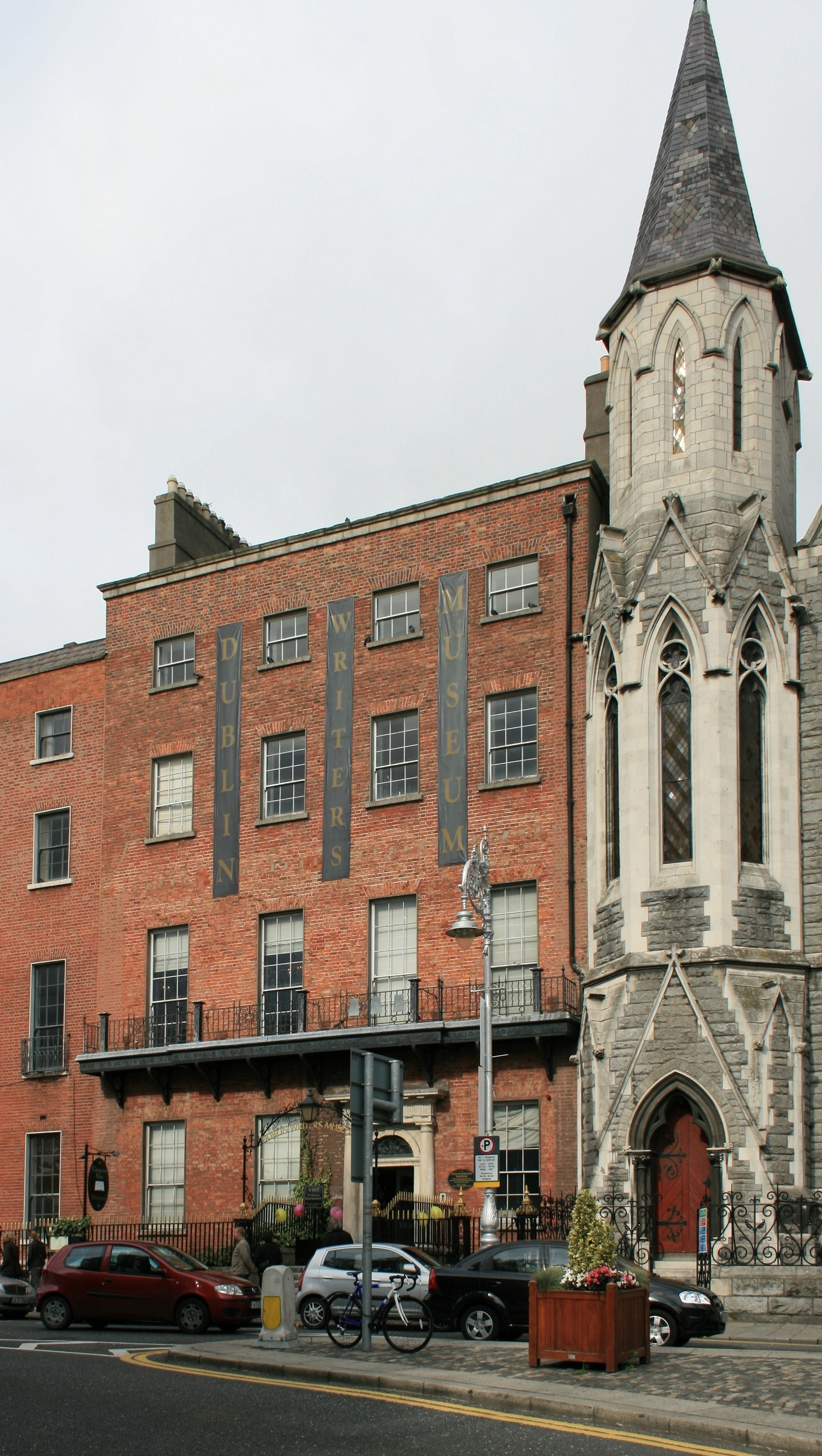

- Location within Central Dublin
- Established: November 1991
- Location: 18 Parnell Square, Dublin
- Coordinates: 53.354383°N 6.26401°W
- Public transit access: Dublin Bus route 46E
- Website: writersmuseum.com

The Dublin Writers Museum was a museum of literary history in Dublin, Ireland. It opened in November 1991, and was hailed as an "iconic" museum in Dublin. It closed during the COVID-19 pandemic, and was brought to an end in 2022 without ever reopening.

== History ==
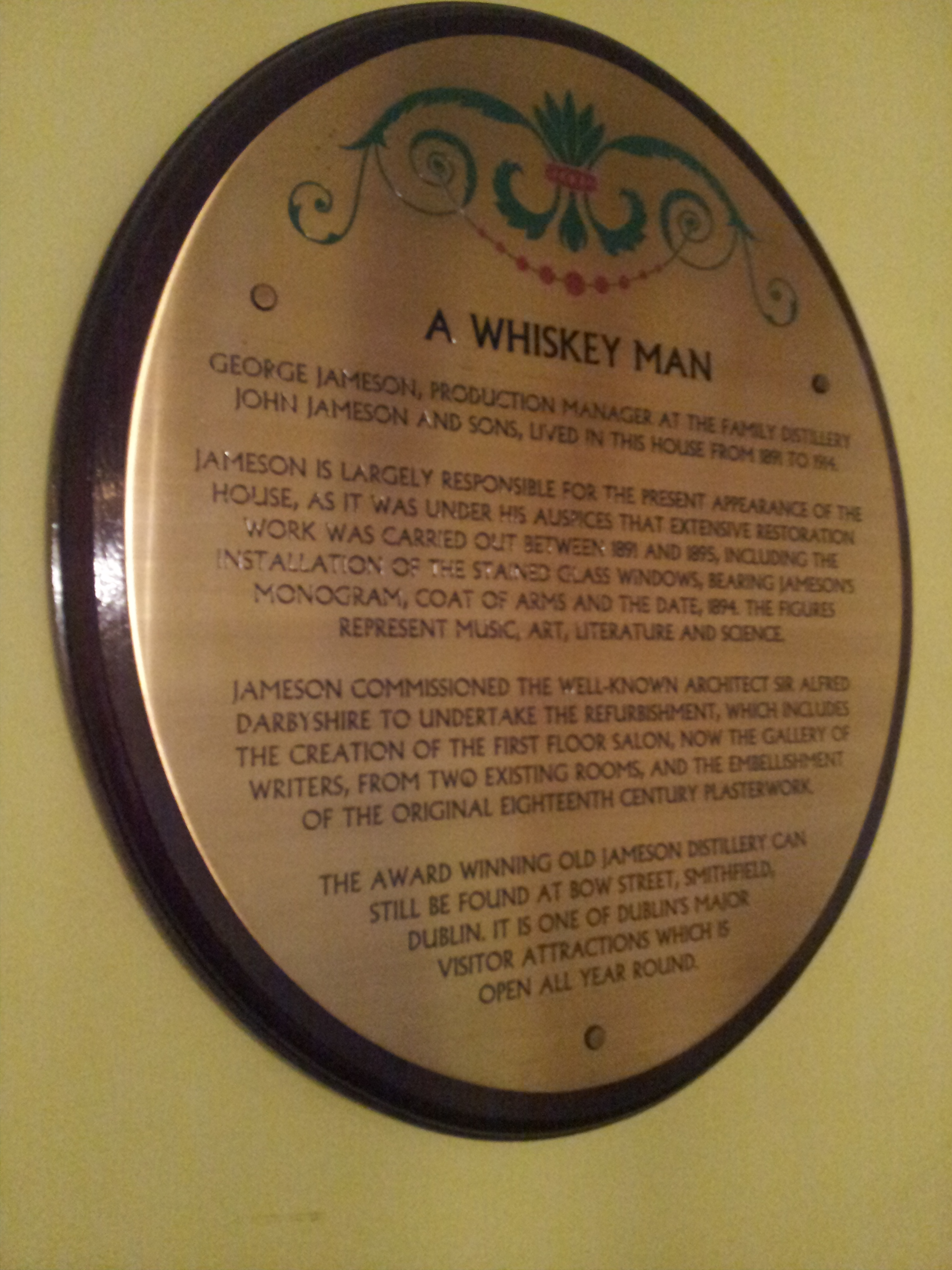
George Jameson Historical Marker concerning the history of the house

Maurice Gorham, journalist and author, proposed the idea of starting a literary museum in the 1970s. The museum was opened on 18 November 1991, run by Dublin Tourism. Its aim was "to promote interest in Irish literature as a whole and in the lives and works of individual Irish writers". It was located in 18 Parnell Square, and consisted of two eighteenth-century buildings. The main building, a red-brick Georgian-style house, had been used by George Jameson, son of the Jameson family, who owned Jameson Irish Whiskey. Michael Stapleton, stuccodore from Dublin, decorated part of the main building. Gorham Library, which commemorated its founder Gorham, was also set up on the upper floor. The annexed building had a coffee shop, bookshop, and lecture room.

David Norris launched his presidential campaign ahead of the Irish presidential election at Dublin Writers Museum on 5 October 2011.

In 2012, Dublin Tourism was merged into Fáilte Ireland, and the museum had also been run by Fáilte Ireland since then.

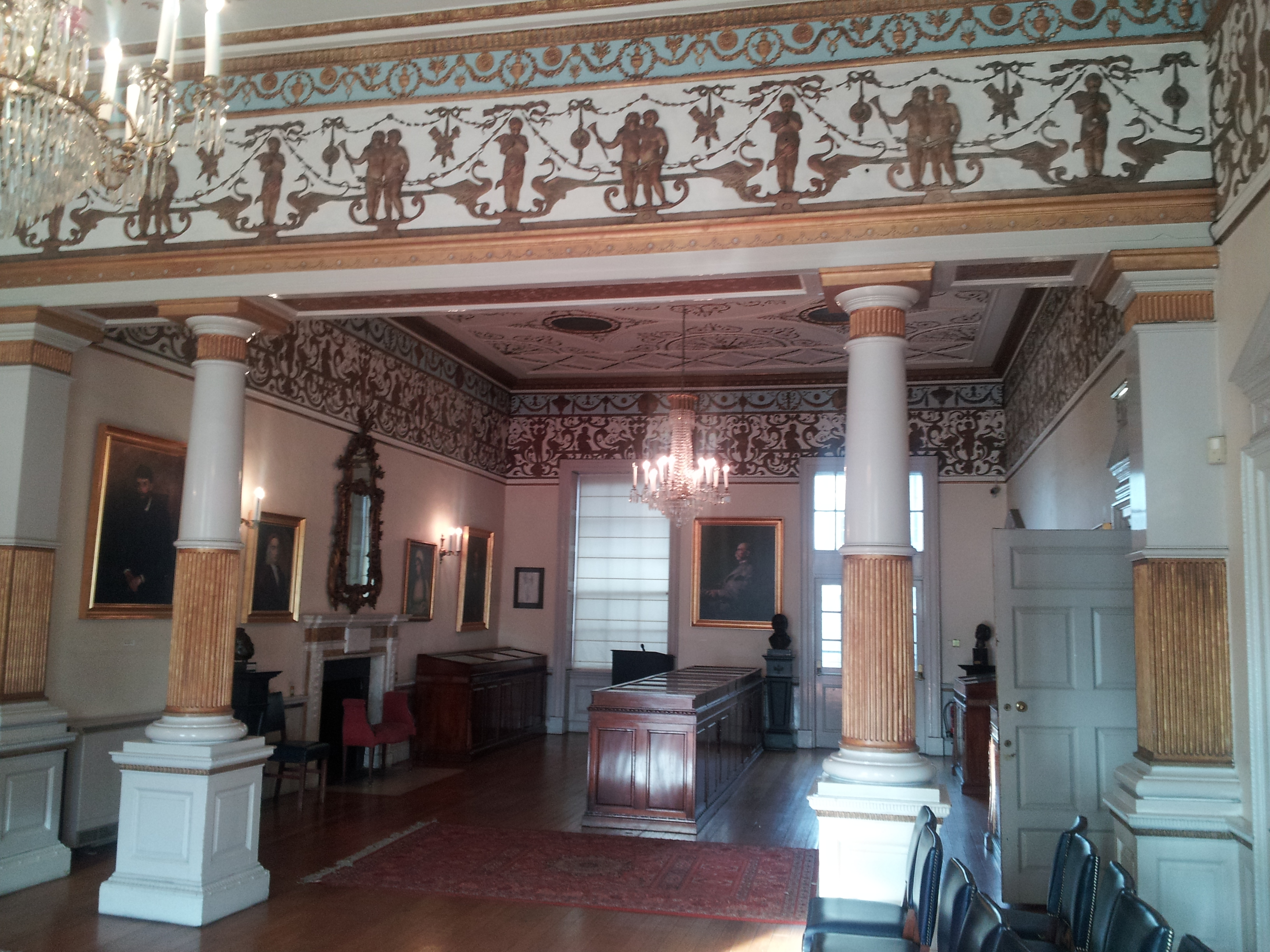
First Floor

Having opened in 1991, the museum closed in March 2020 due to the COVID-19 lockdown. It did not reopen. Set up by Dublin Tourism, it was transferred to Bord Failte in 2012. Bord Failte commissioned a report on its future in 2020, which concluded that it had become dated relative to modern expectations ("no longer meets the expectation of the contemporary museum visitor"), so in 2022, the decision to end the operation permanently was made. Two staff retired, two were allocated other Bord Failte duties. Announcements on the future of owned and lent artifacts were to follow. Fáilte Ireland is still in charge of the museum artifacts after its closing.

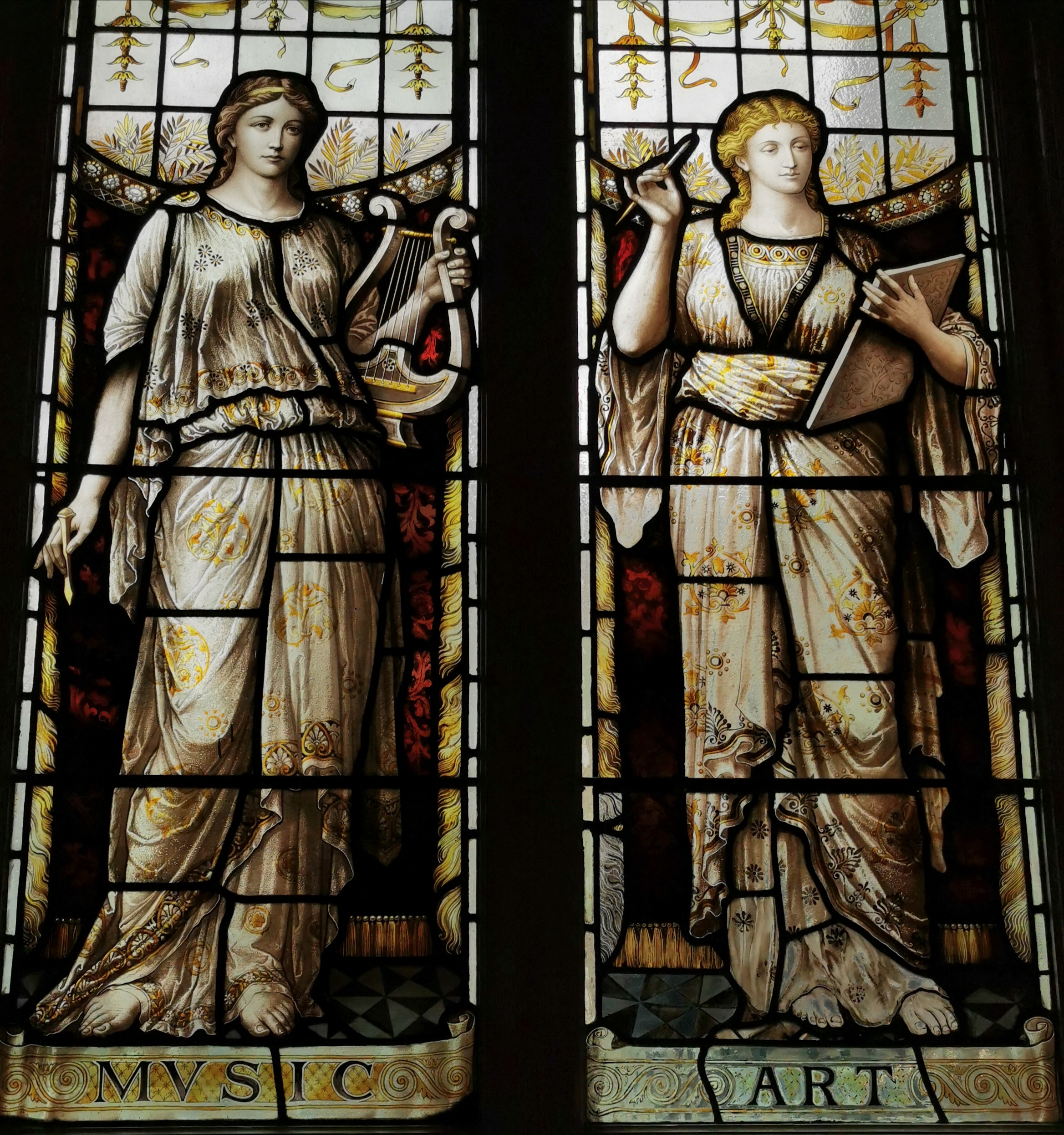
Stained glass windows

It is proposed that the building in 18 Parnell Square should be used as a museum to commemorate Harry Clarke, a stained glass artist from Dublin.

== Exhibitions ==
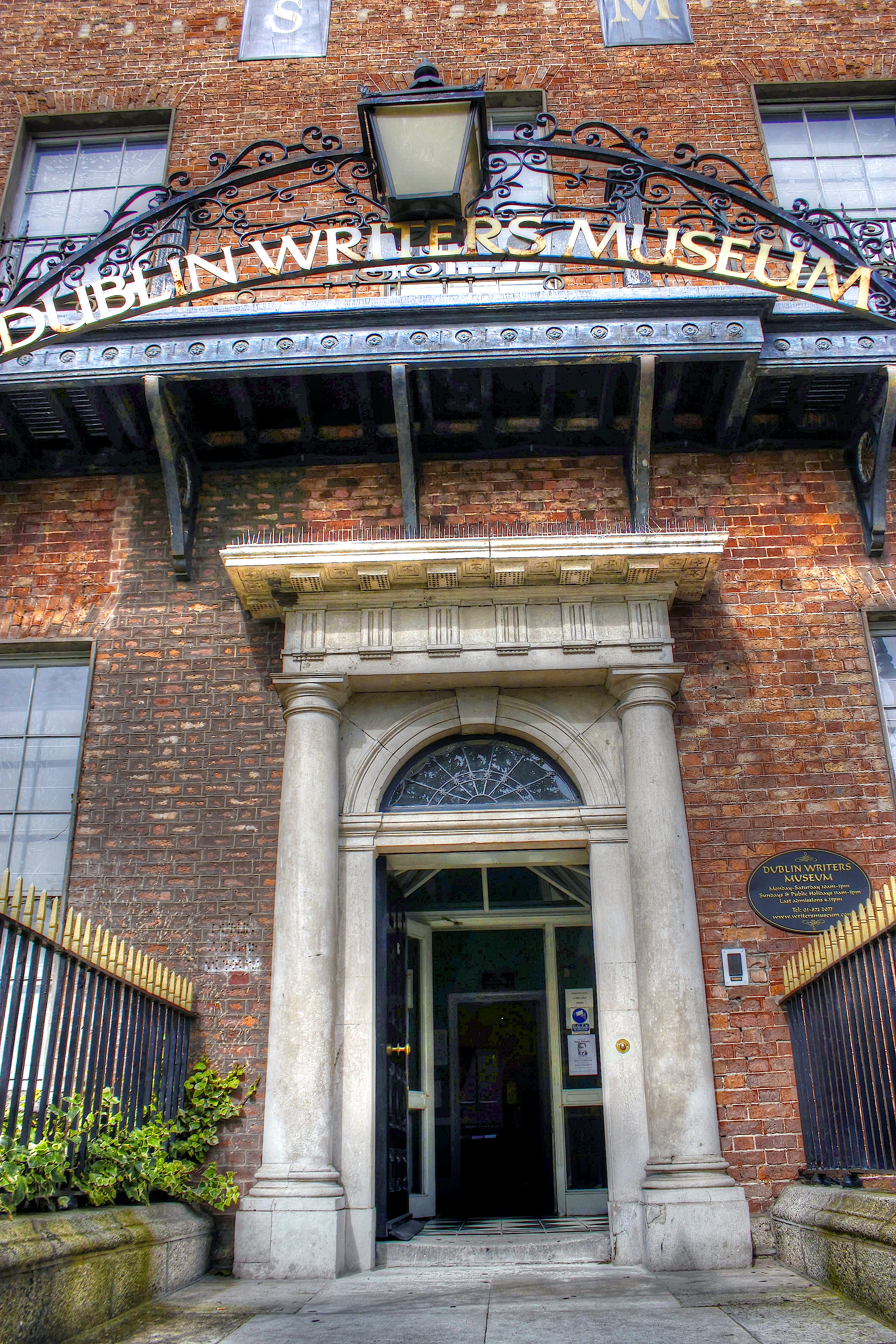
Entrance

The museum collected and exhibited various artifacts related to Irish writers. It owned manuscripts, first editions, portraits, and personal mementos of many writers, including Jonathan Swift, Oscar Wilde, Bram Stoker, George Bernard Shaw, James Joyce, Samuel Beckett, Patrick Kavanagh, William Butler Yeats, Brendan Behan, Seamus Heaney, Brian Friel, Edna O'Brien, Roddy Doyle, Martin McDonagh, and Colm Tóibín. It exhibited Jonathan Swift's coffee pot, the first edition of Bram Stoker's Dracula, Samuel Beckett's telephone, James Joyce's typewriter, and Brendan Behan's union cards and letter. It also had a replica of Book of Kells. Its exhibition was said to be filled with the belongings of "titans of Irish literature", although "most of those represented here are male and deceased".
