= List of failed amendments to the Constitution of Ireland =

The Constitution of Ireland has been amended 32 times since its adoption in 1937. Numerous other amendment bills have been introduced in Dáil Éireann but were not enacted. These include government bills passed by the Dáil and Seanad but rejected at referendum; bills which the government introduced but later decided not to proceed with; and the rest were private member's bills (PMBs), usually introduced by opposition TDs. No amendment PMBs passed second stage until 2015.

== List of amendments ==
Denotes amendment defeated by referendum

Title (Note: Where "Nth" is listed, the title of the bill was "Nth Amendment of the Constitution Bill Year"; Where "Nth (Qualifier)" is listed, the title of the bill was "Nth Amendment of the Constitution (Qualifier) Bill Year".)	Year	Type (Note: PMBs were proposed by opposition TDs unless otherwise noted.)	Proposer	Stage reached	Subject, notes	Ref.
Third	1941	PMB	Fine Gael	Second stage (defeated)	Judges: process for impeachment; make more rigorous by requiring two-thirds majority resolution of each House; extend protection from Supreme Court and High Court to lower-court judges	
Third	1958	Government	Fianna Fáil	Referendum (defeated on 17 June 1959)	Elections to the Dáil: Replace single transferable vote (STV) system with single-member plurality voting (first past the post, FPTP). Also proposed an independent boundary commission for constituencies. The main proposal similar to the 1968 fourth-amendment bill.	
Third	1968	Government	Fianna Fáil	Referendum (defeated on 16 October 1968)	Elections to the Dáil: Specified a degree of malapportionment in favour of rural constituencies over urban constituencies.	
Fourth	1968	Government	Fianna Fáil	Referendum (defeated on 16 October 1968)	Elections to the Dáil: Replace STV with FPTP for Dáil elections. Similar to main proposal of the 1958 bill.	
Fourth (Note: Introduced as the Third Amendment of the Constitution Bill 1968, the government renumbered it the Fourth Amendment when introducing its own Third Amendment bill)	1972	PMB	Labour	First stage (defeated)	Elections: Lower voting age from 21 to 18. Accomplished by the government-sponsored Fourth Amendment of the Constitution Act, 1972.	
Sixth	1978	PMB	Labour	Second stage (defeated)	Rights of children: To facilitate adoptions whose legality had been questioned, and to abolish illegitimacy. The government-sponsored Sixth Amendment passed in 1979 addressed the adoption issue; the Status of Children Act 1987 addressed illegitimacy; the Thirty-first Amendment provided rights for children.	
Eighth	1980	PMB	Socialist Labour Party	First stage (defeated)	Divorce: Permit by deleting Article 41.3.2° and 41.3.3°. Divorce was eventually permitted by the 15th amendment in 1996.	
Eighth (Divorce)	1982	PMB	Workers' Party	First stage (lapsed)	Divorce: Relax ban. This was eventually lifted by the 15th amendment in 1996.	
Eighth (Divorce)	1983	PMB	Workers' Party	First stage (defeated)	Divorce: Relax ban. This was eventually lifted by the 15th amendment in 1996.	
Tenth (Divorce)	1984	PMB	Workers' Party	First stage (defeated)	Divorce: Relax ban. This was eventually lifted by the 15th amendment in 1996.	
Tenth	1985	PMB (Note: PMB by government backbencher)	Fine Gael (Michael O'Leary)	First stage (defeated)	Divorce: Relax ban. O'Leary was a government backbencher. His move prompted the government to introduce its own bill.	
Tenth (No. 2)	1985	PMB (Note: PMB by a member of the smaller party in the Fine Gael-Labour coalition.)	Labour	Second stage (defeated)	Divorce: Relax ban. Labour's coalition partner Fine Gael opposed the bill; a government-sponsored divorce amendment was rejected at referendum later in 1986.	
Tenth	1986	Government	Fine Gael–Labour	Referendum (defeated on 26 June 1986)	Divorce: Relax ban. This was eventually lifted by the 15th amendment in 1996.	
Eleventh	1990	PMB	Workers' Party	Second stage (defeated)	Amend Articles 2 and 3 to weaken the irredentist claim to Northern Ireland. The Nineteenth Amendment in 1999 amended the articles in a similar manner as part of the Northern Ireland peace process.	
Eleventh (Note: This bill was titled Eleventh Amendment of the Constitution 1991 but appears in the Dáil Debates as Eleventh Amendment of the Constitution (No. 2) Bill 1991.)	1991	PMB	Fine Gael	Second stage (lapsed)	Elections: enable Irish emigrants to elect three members of the Seanad.	
Eleventh (No. 2)	1991	PMB	Workers' Party	Second stage (lapsed)	Allow abolition of ground rents	
Eleventh (No. 3)	1991	PMB	Fine Gael	Second stage (defeated)	Rights of women: affirmatively recognise rights of women in section on equality.	
Eleventh (No. 4)	1991	PMB	Fine Gael	Second stage (lapsed)	Bail laws	
Eleventh (Note: There were three bills named Eleventh Amendment of the Constitution Bill 1992: No. 2 of 1992 was a WP PMB, No. 11 of 1992 was a Labour PMB, and No. 12 of 1992 was a government bill which was enacted.)	1992	PMB	Workers' Party	Second stage (lapsed) (Note: On 26 February 1992 the bill was introduced (first stage) by Proinsias De Rossa. De Rossa lost speaking time when he and five other Workers' Party TDs left to form Democratic Left.)	Abortion: removal of provision inserted by Eighth Amendment	
Eleventh	1992	PMB	Labour	Second stage (defeated)	Abortion: allow freedom to information and travel	
Twelfth	1992	Government	Fianna Fáil–Progressive Democrats	Referendum (defeated on 25 November 1992)	Abortion: Partially reverse the X Case decision by removing risk of suicide as grounds for an abortion.	
Fifteenth	1995	PMB	Fianna Fáil	Second stage (defeated)	Restrict right to bail. Accomplished by the government-sponsored Sixteenth Amendment in 1996.	
Seventeenth	1997	PMB	Progressive Democrats	Second stage (lapsed)	Election of President: Allow nominating petitions	
Eighteenth	1997	PMB	Fine Gael	Second stage (lapsed)	Election of President: Allow nominating petitions by 20,000 voters	
Twentieth	1999	PMB	Democratic Left	Second stage (lapsed)	Lower the age of eligibility for TDs from 21 to 18.	
Twenty-first	1999	PMB	Greens	Second stage (lapsed)	Neutrality: Require a referendum before the state could join to join a military alliance	
Twenty-first (No. 2)	1999	PMB	Greens	Second stage (lapsed)	Allowing constitutional amendments by initiative	
Twenty-first (No. 3)	1999	PMB	Labour	Second stage (defeated)	Rights: Guarantee economic, social and cultural rights	
Twenty-first (No. 4)	1999	PMB	Labour	Second stage (lapsed)	Rights: Prohibits "unfair discrimination" and permits positive discrimination.	
Twenty-first (No. 5)	1999	PMB	Labour	Second stage (lapsed)	Rights of children, in particular the UN Convention on the Rights of the Child	
Twenty-second	2001	Government	Fianna Fáil–Progressive Democrats	Committee stage (lapsed)	Judges: process for impeachment	
Twenty-fourth	2001	Government	Fianna Fáil–Progressive Democrats	Referendum (defeated on 7 June 2001)	European Union: Ratify the Treaty of Nice. The Twenty-sixth Amendment in 2002 passed referendum and accomplished this.	
Twenty-fourth	2002	PMB	Labour	First stage (withdrawn)	Neutrality: amend Article 29 to allow the state to participate in UN operations but not to join any military alliance. Withdrawn when the Twenty-sixth Amendment included an opt-out from the EU's Common Security and Defence Policy.	
Twenty-fifth	2001	PMB	Sinn Féin	Second stage (lapsed)	Neutrality: forbid the state from joining any military alliance	
Twenty-fifth (Protection of Human Life in Pregnancy)	2001	Government	Fianna Fáil–Progressive Democrats	Referendum (defeated on 6 March 2002)	Abortion: Partially reverse the X Case decision by removing risk of suicide as grounds for an abortion, and specify the legal grounds for abortion.	
Twenty-seventh	2003	PMB	Sinn Féin	Second stage (defeated)	Neutrality: affirms neutrality, forbids the state from joining any military alliance; war may only be declared by the Dáil.	
Twenty-seventh (No. 2)	2003	PMB	Sinn Féin	Second stage (defeated)	Rights: Guarantee the right to housing	
Twenty-eighth	2005	Government	Fianna Fáil–Progressive Democrats	First stage (lapsed)	European Union: Ratify the proposed Treaty establishing a Constitution for Europe. The government did not proceed with the amendment when the Treaty was abandoned after it was rejected by France and the Netherlands at referendums.	
Twenty-eighth	2006	PMB	Labour	Second stage (lapsed)	Preserve cultural heritage and commit to sustainable development	
Twenty-eighth (No. 2)	2006	PMB	Greens	Second stage (lapsed)	Elections: Lower age of candidacy for Dáil and presidential elections	
Twenty eighth (No. 3)	2006	PMB	Greens	Second stage (lapsed)	Presidency: ease ballot access by reducing the qualifying number of Oireachtas members and allowing nominating petitions; reduce the term from seven to five years; mandate annual address to the Oireachtas; mandate meetings of the Council of State	
Twenty-eighth	2007	Government	Fianna Fáil–Progressive Democrats	Second stage (lapsed)	Rights of children, insertion of a new article. The 2012 31st amendment covers similar ground.	
Twenty-eighth	2008	Government	Fianna Fáil–Greens–Progressive Democrats	Referendum (defeated on 12 June 2008)	European Union: Ratify the Treaty of Lisbon. This was achieved with the Twenty-eighth Amendment of the Constitution of Ireland which passed in a referendum the following year.	
Twenty-ninth	2008	PMB	Sinn Féin	Second stage (lapsed)	Rights relating to trade unions	
Twenty-ninth	2009	PMB	Fine Gael	Second stage (lapsed)	Judges: Ease the restriction on reducing judges' pay. This was achieved by the Twenty-ninth Amendment of the Constitution of Ireland which was passed in a referendum in 2011.	
Twenty-ninth	2011	PMB (Note: The Greens were the smaller party in a Fianna Fáil-led government when they introduced the bill in December 2010; they left government in January 2011.)	Greens	Second stage (lapsed)	Defines "economic treason".	
Twenty-ninth (No.2)	2011	PMB	Fianna Fáil	Second stage (defeated)	Allow only individual voters to make political donations.	
Twenty-ninth (No.3)	2011	PMB	Fianna Fáil	Second stage (defeated)	Allow for the adoption of any child. Achieved by the Thirty-first Amendment of the Constitution of Ireland passed by referendum in 2012	
Thirtieth (Houses of the Oireachtas Inquiries)	2011	Government	Fine Gael–Labour	Referendum (defeated on 27 October 2011)	Oireachtas: overturn the 2002 John Carthy verdict limiting the power of Oireachtas inquiries.	
Thirty-first (The President)	2011	PMB	Technical group (Catherine Murphy)	Second stage (defeated)	Presidency: ease ballot access by reducing the qualifying number of Oireachtas members and allowing nominating petitions; remove reference to "proportional representation"; reduce the term from seven to five years	
Thirty-first (Economic, Social and Cultural Rights)	2012	PMB	Labour (Kevin Humphreys)	Second stage (lapsed) (Note: Bills lapsed when 31st Dáil dissolved and not revived in 32nd Dáil.)	Rights: Guarantee economic, social and cultural rights	
Thirty-second (Dáil Éireann)	2012	PMB	Fine Gael (Brendan Griffin)	Second stage (lapsed)	Dáil Éireann: to comprise 100 single-member constituencies by instant-runoff voting (plus the Ceann Comhairle)	
Thirty-second (Abolition of Seanad Éireann)	2013	Government	Fine Gael–Labour	Referendum (defeated on 4 October 2013)	Oireachtas: Abolish Seanad Éireann.	
Thirty-fourth (Judicial Appointments)	2013	PMB	Technical group (Shane Ross)	Second stage (defeated)	Judges: establish a non-political body to nominate judges, subject to Oireachtas ratification	
Thirty-fourth (Neutrality)	2013	PMB	Sinn Féin	Second stage (defeated)	Neutrality: declaration of neutrality and forbidding the state from joining any military alliance	
Thirty-fourth (No. 3)	2014	PMB	Sinn Féin	Second stage (defeated)	Rights: Guarantee right to water; and Public ownership mandated for the Irish water supply	
Thirty-fourth (Right to Personal Autonomy and Bodily Integrity)	2014	PMB	Technical group (Clare Daly)	Second stage (defeated)	Abortion: repeal the Eighth Amendment, and guarantee rights to personal autonomy and bodily integrity	
Thirty-fourth (Members of the Houses of the Oireachtas)	2014	PMB	Technical group (Peter Mathews)	Second stage (defeated)	Oireachtas: loosen the party whip system	
Thirty-fourth (Peace and Neutrality)	2014	PMB	Technical group (Mick Wallace)	Second stage (defeated)	Neutrality: Adhere to Section V of the Hague Convention of 1907	
Thirty-fourth	2014	PMB	Technical group (Socialist Party)	Second stage (defeated)	Abortion: repeal the Eighth Amendment	
Thirty-fourth (Economic, Social and Cultural Rights)	2014	PMB	Technical Group (Thomas Pringle)	Second stage (defeated)	Rights: Guarantee economic, social and cultural rights	
Thirty-fifth (Age of Eligibility for Election to the Office of President)	2015	Government	Fine Gael–Labour	Referendum (defeated on 22 May 2015)	Presidency: reduce age of candidacy from 35 to 21	
Thirty-fourth (Voting Rights in Referenda)	2014	PMB	Sinn Féin	Second stage (lapsed)	Election of President: allow emigrants to vote	
Thirty-fourth (No. 2)	2014	PMB	Sinn Féin	Committee stage (lapsed)	Elections: Lower voting age from 18 to 16.	
Thirty-fourth (Dáil Éireann)	2015	PMB	Fine Gael (Brendan Griffin)	Second stage (lapsed)	Dáil Éireann: to comprise 158 single-member constituencies; eliminate single transferable vote requirement	
Thirty-fifth (Fixed Period for the Duration of Dáil Éireann)	2015	PMB	Technical group (Shane Ross)	Second stage (lapsed)	Dáil Éireann: fixed term of five years	
Thirty-fifth (Repeal of the Eighth Amendment)	2016	PMB	AAA–PBP	Second stage (defeated)	Abortion: repeal the Eighth Amendment, which guarantees the "right to life of the unborn". A motion was passed rejecting the bill, to allow the Citizens' Assembly to consider the issue.	
Thirty-fifth (Neutrality)	2016	PMB	Sinn Féin	Second stage (defeated)	Neutrality: prohibit assisting foreign preparations for war without the consent of the Dáil, and prohibit joining any military alliance. A motion was passed rejecting the bill "to protect the authority of the Executive to conduct external relations" and affirming existing neutrality provisions and policies.	
Thirty-fifth (Economic, Social and Cultural Rights)	2016	PMB	Sinn Féin	Second stage (defeated)	Rights: Guarantee economic, social and cultural rights	
Thirty-fifth (Right to Housing)	2017	PMB	Solidarity–PBP	Second stage (defeated)	Rights: Guarantee the right to housing	
Thirty-eighth (Neutrality)	2018	PMB	Sinn Féin	Second stage (defeated)	Neutrality: prohibit involvement in any war unless "immediately necessary in defence of the State".	
Thirty-fifth (Right to a Home)	2016	PMB	Sinn Féin	Second stage (defeated)	Rights: Guarantee the right to housing	
Thirty-fifth (Common Ownership of Water Resources)	2016	PMB	Greens	Second stage (lapsed)	Public ownership mandated for the Irish water supply	
Thirty-fifth (Public Ownership of Certain Assets)	2016	PMB	Labour (Willie Penrose)	Second stage (lapsed)	Public ownership mandated for the Irish water supply, gas network, and electricity grid	
Thirty-fifth (Protection of Pension Property Rights)	2017	PMB	Fianna Fáil (Willie O'Dea)	Second stage (lapsed)	Prohibit taxing of private pension savings (such as had been done from 2011 to 2016 during the post-2008 austerity).	
Thirty-fifth (Blasphemy)	2017	PMB	Social Democrats	Second stage (lapsed)	Religion: remove the constitution's requirement to criminalise blasphemy. Effected by the 37th amendment in 2018	
Thirty-fifth (Separation of Church and State)	2017	PMB	Solidarity–PBP	Second stage (lapsed)	Religion: mandate separation of church and state	
Thirty-ninth (Right to Housing)	2019	PMB	Independent (Tommy Broughan)	Second stage (lapsed)	Rights: Guarantee the right to housing	
Thirty-Ninth (Right to Health)	2019	PMB	Rural Independents (Michael Harty)	Second stage (defeated)	Rights: Guarantee the right to health	
Thirty-fourth (Inclusive Budget Reform)	2014	PMB	Sinn Féin	Second stage (defeated)	Repeal the requirement that measures incurring public spending can only be proposed by the government	
Thirty-Ninth (Neutrality)	2022	PMB	Solidarity–PBP	Second stage (defeated)	Neutrality: "non-membership of military alliances" and no transit to warzones of foreign "material or personnel"	
Thirty-ninth (The Family)	2023	Government	Fine Gael–Fianna Fáil–Green	Referendum (defeated on 8 March 2024)	Family: extend protection to non-marital families	
Fortieth (Care)	2023	Government	Fine Gael–Fianna Fáil–Green	Referendum (defeated on 8 March 2024)	Family: replace reference to "woman['s] ... duties in the home" with reference to "the provision of care, by members of a family to one another"	
