= Tenth Amendment of the Constitution of Ireland =

Amendment on the Single European Act

- 26 May 1987
- To permit the state to ratify the Single European Act

Results
| Choice | Votes | % |
|---|---|---|
| Yes | 755,423 | 69.92% |
| No | 324,977 | 30.08% |
| Valid votes | 1,080,400 | 99.55% |
| Invalid or blank votes | 4,904 | 0.45% |
| Total votes | 1,085,304 | 100.00% |
| Registered voters/turnout | 2,461,790 | 44.09% |

The Tenth Amendment of the Constitution Act 1987 (previously bill no. 8 of 1987) is an amendment to the Constitution of Ireland that permitted the state to ratify the Single European Act. It was approved by referendum on 26 May 1987 and signed into law on 22 June of the same year.

== Background ==
The Single European Act (SEA) was signed in February 1986 by the member states of the European Economic Community. It amended the Treaty of Rome and established the European Single Market. The European Communities (Amendment) Act 1986 was passed to allow provisions of the SEA to become part of domestic Irish law. On 22 December 1986, Raymond Crotty sought an injunction preventing Minister for Foreign Affairs Peter Barry from ratifying the Treaty on behalf of the state. He was refused relief by Donal Barrington in the High Court but was successful in part in the Supreme Court. In a majority judgment delivered in Crotty v. An Taoiseach, the Court held that Title III of the SEA would bind the State to concede part of its sovereignty in a manner not permitted by the Constitution under the amendment made in 1972 to allow accession to the European Communities. In response, the newly elected government of Taoiseach Charles Haughey proposed an amendment to the constitution.

== Changes to the text ==
Amendment to Article 29.4.3° by the addition of the text in bold (emphasis added):

3° The State may become a member of the European Coal and Steel Community (established by Treaty signed at Paris on the 18th day of April, 1951), the European Economic Community (established by Treaty signed at Rome on the 25th day of March, 1957) and the European Atomic Energy Community (established by Treaty signed at Rome on the 25th day of March, 1957). The State may ratify the Single European Act (signed on behalf of the Member States of the Communities at Luxembourg on the 17th day of February, 1986, and at The Hague on the 28th day of February, 1986). No provision of this Constitution invalidates laws enacted, acts done or measures adopted by the State necessitated by the obligations of membership of the Communities, or prevents laws enacted, acts done or measures adopted by the Communities, or institutions thereof, from having the force of law in the State.

== Oireachtas debates ==
The Tenth Amendment of the Constitution Bill 1987 was proposed in the Dáil by Taoiseach Charles Haughey on 22 April 1987 on behalf of the minority Fianna Fáil government. It was also supported by Fine Gael, who had negotiated the SEA during the previous government. At Second Stage, it passed by 108 votes to 29, where was opposed by the Progressive Democrats, the Labour Party, the Workers' Party, and independent TDs Neil Blaney and Tony Gregory. It passed Final Stages in the Dáil on 24 April by 123 votes to 17, on this occasion with the Progressive Democrats supporting its passage. It passed the Seanad on 25 April and proceeded to a referendum.

== Campaign ==
As well as the parties above, the SEA was also supported by employers' and farmers' organisations.

Mary McAleese was a prominent opponent of the proposal to ratify the Single European Act.

== Result ==
Tenth Amendment of the Constitution of Ireland referendum
| Choice | Votes | % |
|---|---|---|
| For | 755,423 | 69.92 |
| Against | 324,977 | 30.08 |
| **Total** | **1,080,400** | **100.00** |
| Valid votes | 1,080,400 | 99.55 |
| Invalid/blank votes | 4,904 | 0.45 |
| Total votes | **1,085,304** | **100.00** |
| Registered voters/turnout | 2,461,790 | 44.09 |

Results by constituency
| Constituency | Electorate | Turnout (%) | Votes | | Proportion of votes | |
| Constituency | Electorate | Turnout (%) | Yes | No | Yes | No |
|---|---|---|---|---|---|---|
| Carlow–Kilkenny | 78,653 | 45.0% | 25,284 | 9,856 | 72.0% | 28.0% |
| Cavan–Monaghan | 75,913 | 41.4% | 24,913 | 6,294 | 79.9% | 20.1% |
| Clare | 63,510 | 42.6% | 20,816 | 6,129 | 77.3% | 22.7% |
| Cork East | 55,940 | 46.7% | 17,285 | 8,747 | 66.4% | 33.6% |
| Cork North-Central | 64,011 | 43.6% | 15,068 | 12,759 | 54.2% | 45.8% |
| Cork North-West | 41,244 | 48.4% | 14,296 | 5,549 | 72.1% | 27.9% |
| Cork South-Central | 77,231 | 50.7% | 24,040 | 14,983 | 61.7% | 38.3% |
| Cork South-West | 42,304 | 47.1% | 13,734 | 6,100 | 69.3% | 30.7% |
| Donegal North-East | 44,055 | 38.5% | 11,040 | 5,834 | 65.5% | 34.5% |
| Donegal South-West | 47,526 | 34.2% | 11,090 | 5,117 | 68.5% | 31.5% |
| Dublin Central | 72,116 | 43.6% | 18,182 | 13,150 | 58.1% | 41.9% |
| Dublin North | 48,071 | 46.0% | 16,090 | 5,927 | 73.1% | 26.9% |
| Dublin North-Central | 57,247 | 51.2% | 19,263 | 9,944 | 66.0% | 34.0% |
| Dublin North-East | 51,377 | 46.9% | 15,165 | 8,816 | 63.3% | 36.7% |
| Dublin North-West | 50,742 | 43.4% | 11,916 | 10,018 | 54.4% | 45.6% |
| Dublin South | 79,614 | 53.7% | 31,614 | 11,074 | 74.1% | 25.9% |
| Dublin South-Central | 76,743 | 45.6% | 21,313 | 13,574 | 61.1% | 38.9% |
| Dublin South-East | 68,638 | 42.2% | 19,542 | 9,305 | 67.8% | 32.2% |
| Dublin South-West | 62,489 | 41.2% | 15,177 | 10,513 | 59.1% | 40.9% |
| Dublin West | 77,363 | 42.1% | 19,994 | 12,537 | 61.5% | 38.5% |
| Dún Laoghaire | 78,721 | 53.1% | 31,821 | 9,914 | 76.3% | 23.7% |
| Galway East | 42,491 | 39.5% | 13,897 | 2,823 | 83.2% | 16.8% |
| Galway West | 78,785 | 36.2% | 20,817 | 7,571 | 73.4% | 26.6% |
| Kerry North | 46,427 | 38.8% | 10,709 | 7,201 | 59.8% | 40.2% |
| Kerry South | 42,565 | 40.9% | 11,560 | 5,778 | 66.7% | 33.3% |
| Kildare | 76,003 | 42.5% | 23,685 | 8,514 | 73.6% | 26.4% |
| Laois–Offaly | 75,693 | 41.3% | 22,758 | 8,332 | 73.3% | 26.7% |
| Limerick East | 68,065 | 44.0% | 21,350 | 8,517 | 71.5% | 28.5% |
| Limerick West | 43,146 | 45.8% | 15,846 | 3,836 | 80.6% | 19.4% |
| Longford–Westmeath | 61,589 | 39.9% | 18,686 | 5,729 | 76.6% | 23.4% |
| Louth | 62,545 | 44.4% | 19,397 | 8,270 | 70.2% | 29.8% |
| Mayo East | 41,117 | 40.0% | 13,406 | 2,946 | 82.0% | 18.0% |
| Mayo West | 40,895 | 39.0% | 12,779 | 3,057 | 80.7% | 19.3% |
| Meath | 75,382 | 43.1% | 23,822 | 8,502 | 73.7% | 26.3% |
| Roscommon | 41,329 | 42.6% | 14,001 | 3,494 | 80.1% | 19.9% |
| Sligo–Leitrim | 59,608 | 45.0% | 20,110 | 6,540 | 75.5% | 24.5% |
| Tipperary North | 41,507 | 46.6% | 14,343 | 4,888 | 74.6% | 25.4% |
| Tipperary South | 55,560 | 46.4% | 19,180 | 6,464 | 74.8% | 25.2% |
| Waterford | 60,409 | 45.2% | 18,442 | 8,688 | 68.0% | 32.0% |
| Wexford | 69,773 | 44.2% | 22,208 | 8,524 | 72.3% | 27.7% |
| Wicklow | 65,393 | 45.9% | 20,784 | 9,163 | 69.5% | 30.5% |
| **Total** | **2,461,790** | **44.1%** | 755,423 | **324,977** | 69.9% | **30.1%** |

== Aftermath ==
The Single European Act came into effect on 1 July 1987 after Ireland had ratified it.

Because of the decision of the Supreme Court in Crotty v An Taoiseach, the constitution would need to be amended on every further occasion before a treaty could be ratified that would transfer sovereignty from the Irish government to a supranational authority. This has since occurred on the following occasions:

- Maastricht Treaty
  - Eleventh Amendment of the Constitution of Ireland approved by referendum in 1992
- Amsterdam Treaty
  - Eighteenth Amendment of the Constitution of Ireland approved by referendum in 1998
- Rome Statute of the International Criminal Court
  - Twenty-third Amendment of the Constitution of Ireland approved by referendum in 2001
- Nice Treaty
  - Twenty-fourth Amendment of the Constitution Bill 2001 rejected by referendum in 2001
  - Twenty-sixth Amendment of the Constitution of Ireland approved by referendum in 2002
- Lisbon Treaty
  - Twenty-eighth Amendment of the Constitution Bill 2008 rejected by referendum in 2008
  - Twenty-eighth Amendment of the Constitution of Ireland approved by referendum in 2009
- European Fiscal Compact
  - Thirtieth Amendment of the Constitution of Ireland approved by referendum in 2012

== See also ==
- Politics of the Republic of Ireland
- History of the Republic of Ireland
