= Amendments to the Constitution of Ireland =

Changes to the fundamental law of Ireland by referendum

Amendments to the Constitution of Ireland are only possible by way of referendum. A proposal to amend the Constitution of Ireland must be initiated as a bill in Dáil Éireann, be passed by both Houses of the Oireachtas (parliament), then submitted to a referendum, and finally signed into law by the president of Ireland. Since the constitution entered into force on 29 December 1937, there have been 32 amendments to the constitution.

Aside from amendments to the Constitution itself, the Constitution also provides for referendums on ordinary bills; this is known as an ordinary referendum. This provision has never been used.

== Procedure for amendment of the Constitution ==
=== Referendum ===
The procedure for amending the constitution is specified in Article 46. A proposed amendment must take the form of a bill to amend the constitution initiated in Dáil Éireann, the house of representatives of the Oireachtas. It must then be passed or deemed to have been passed by both Houses of the Oireachtas. The Third Amendment of the Constitution Bill 1958, a proposal to alter the voting system, did not pass the Seanad but was deemed to have passed the Seanad 90 days after it was sent by the Dáil. After passage through the Houses of the Oireachtas, the Minister for Housing, Local Government and Heritage must set a date for the referendum not less than thirty days and not more than ninety days after the date of the order.

The Electoral Commission has functions to give a general explanation of the subject matter and text of the referendum and promote public awareness of the referendum and encourage the public to vote. From 1998 to 2023, these functions were previously carried out by a Referendum Commission established for each referendum.

A simple majority of votes cast is sufficient to carry an amendment, with no minimum turnout required for a constitutional referendum to be considered valid. The vote is conducted by secret ballot. A proposal to amend the constitution put to a referendum must not contain any other proposal. While British citizens resident in the state may vote in a general election, only Irish citizens can participate in a referendum.

=== After the referendum ===
Once the referendum count has concluded the referendum returning officer signs a provisional referendum certificate, and publishes a copy in Iris Oifigiúil. Anyone wishing to challenge the results of the referendum then has seven days to apply to the High Court for leave to present a referendum petition. If no one makes such an application, if leave is not granted, or if a petition is dismissed, the referendum certificate becomes final.

When the referendum passed and the final certificate has issued, the amendment must be signed into law by the President "forthwith". Provided that the correct procedure has been complied with, the President cannot veto an amendment. The dates given for the amendments listed in this article are, unless otherwise stated, the dates on which they were signed into law. The shortest gap between the referendum and signing into law was twelve days for the 18th, 19th and 20th amendments. The longest was 899 days for the 31st amendment. No referendum has ever been annulled by the courts.

=== Transitional and conditional amendments ===
The Nineteenth Amendment, passed in May 1998, introduced a novel method of amendment. Its provisions allowed the later amendment to Articles 2 and 3 of the Constitution in 1999. The Nineteenth Amendment did not itself amend those articles, but rather introduced a temporary special mechanism by which the Government could order their amendment once it was satisfied that certain commitments made by other parties to the Good Friday Agreement had been complied with. The sections added to the text of the Constitution which provided for this later amendment to Articles no longer appear in the published official text of the Constitution, in line with their own provisions.

A similar method would have been used with the Twenty-fifth Amendment of the Constitution Bill 2001 to restrict abortion, which was rejected. The proposed Thirty-second Amendment of the Constitution Bill 2013 to abolish Seanad Éireann involved later amendments which would have taken effect after the next general election.

The Thirty-third Amendment that established the Court of Appeal had amendments which became part of the text only on the later establishment of the Court, and transitory provisions which would not appear in later printed official versions.

=== Historical methods ===
As a transitional measure, for the first three years after the election of the first President of Ireland a bill to amend the Constitution could be passed by the Oireachtas as an ordinary act. An amendment bill before the election of the first President (on 25 June 1938) would have required a referendum. To prevent the Oireachtas abusing this provision, the President had the power to refer such a bill to the people. The First and Second Amendments were adopted in this way; President Douglas Hyde chose to sign each into law without referendum. The three-year limit was entrenched to prevent it being extended without referendum. Since 25 June 1941, the third anniversary of President Hyde's election, every amendment has had to be put to a referendum after its passage through the Oireachtas.

== List of amendments and referendums ==
The following table lists all amendments to the Constitution, and all past referendums relating to the Constitution. In general it does not list proposed amendments which were not passed by the Oireachtas, for which see the separate list of failed amendments to the Constitution of Ireland. The exception is the 2001 Twenty-second Amendment Bill, listed below to explain the gap in the numbering of subsequent amendments.

Color key:

Referendum passed
Amendment defeated by referendum
Referendum pending or not held

Table of amendments and referendums relating to the Constitution of Ireland
Proposal	Enactment date	Subject	Referendum date	Electorate	Total poll	(%) (Note: Total poll as a percentage of the electorate)	For	(%) (Note: As a percentage of the valid poll (total poll less spoilt votes))	Against	(%)	Spoilt	(%) (Note: Spoilt votes as a percentage of the total poll.)	Ref
Draft Constitution	1 July 1937 (Note: The Constitution was enacted by the plebiscite approving it. There was no formal signing into law. It came into force 180 days after the plebiscite, on 29 December 1937.)	Adoption of the Constitution	1 July 1937	1,775,055	1,346,207	75.8	685,105	56.5	526,945	43.5	134,157	10.0	
	The draft Constitution was not a bill, but was passed by Dáil Éireann in the same manner as a bill before it was submitted for approval by the electorate.												
1st Amendment	2 September 1939	Definition of war	N/A (Note: The first two amendment acts were passed during the three-year transitional period when a referendum was not required.)										
	Extended the definition of "time of war" to include a war in which the state is not a participant. This was to allow the Government to exercise emergency powers during the Second World War, in which the state was neutral.												
2nd Amendment	30 May 1941	Textual adjustments	N/A										
	An omnibus bill with a variety of mostly minor textual amendments. Some changes were only to the Irish text, to correspond more closely to the sense of the English text.												
3rd Amendment Bill	N/A	Elections: Dáil: electoral system	17 June 1959	1,678,450	979,531	58.4	453,322	48.2	486,989	51.8	39,220	4.0	
	Proposal to alter the electoral system for elections to Dáil Éireann from the multi-member single transferable vote (STV) to the single-member First Past the Post (FPTP) system. It also proposed to establish an independent commission for boundary delimitation of Dáil constituencies.												
3rd Amendment Bill	N/A	Elections: Dáil: constituency boundaries	16 October 1968	1,717,389	1,129,477	65.8	424,185	39.2	656,803	60.8	48,489	4.3	
	Proposed to allow greater malapportionment in favour of rural areas in boundary delimitation of Dáil constituencies.												
4th Amendment Bill	N/A	Elections: Dáil: electoral system	16 October 1968	1,717,389	1,129,606	65.8	423,496	39.2	657,898	60.8	48,212	4.3	
	A second proposal to alter the Dáil electoral system from STV to FPTP.												
3rd Amendment	8 June 1972	Treaty: Europe: Accession	10 May 1972	1,783,604	1,264,278	70.9	1,041,890	83.1	211,891	16.9	10,497	0.8	
	Permitted the state to join the European Communities.												
4th Amendment	5 January 1973	Elections: franchise: voting age	7 December 1972	1,783,604	903,439	50.7	724,836	84.6	131,514	15.4	47,089	5.2	
	Reduced the minimum voting age from 21 to 18.												
5th Amendment	5 January 1973	Recognition of religions	7 December 1972	1,783,604	903,659	50.7	721,003	84.4	133,430	15.6	49,326	5.5	
	Removed reference to the "special position" of the Catholic Church and to other named denominations.												
6th Amendment	3 August 1979	Adoption board	5 July 1979	2,179,466	623,476	28.6	601,694	99.0	6,265	1.0	15,517	2.5	
	Reversed a 1977 finding that certain orders made by the adoption board were unconstitutional.												
7th Amendment	3 August 1979	Seanad: university constituencies	5 July 1979	2,179,466	622,646	28.6	552,600	92.4	45,484	7.6	24,562	3.9	
	Allowed the Seanad representation of Dublin University and the National University to be extended to graduates of other third-level institutions. This provision was not invoked until 2024, with the Seanad Electoral (University Members) (Amendment) Bill 2024.												
8th Amendment	7 October 1983	Abortion: recognised the equal right to life of the unborn	7 September 1983	2,358,651	1,265,994	53.7	841,233	66.9	416,136	33.1	8,625	0.7	
	Gave constitutional recognition to the equal right to life of the unborn to entrench the statutory prohibition of abortion. Repealed on 18 September 2018, upon enactment of the 36th Amendment.												
9th Amendment	2 August 1984	Elections: franchise: votes for non-citizens	14 June 1984	2,399,257	1,138,895	47.5	828,483	75.4	270,250	24.6	40,162	3.5	
	Permitted legislation to be enacted allowing citizens of other countries to vote in elections for Dáil Éireann.												
10th Amendment Bill	N/A	Rights: Divorce	26 June 1986	2,436,836	1,482,644	60.8	538,279	36.5	935,843	63.5	8,522	0.6	
	Proposed to remove the constitutional ban on divorce. The ban was eventually lifted by the Fifteenth Amendment in 1996.												
10th Amendment	22 June 1987	Treaty: Europe: Single European Act	26 May 1987	2,461,790	1,085,304	44.1	755,423	69.9	324,977	30.1	4,904	0.5	
	Permitted the state to ratify the Single European Act.												
11th Amendment	16 July 1992	Treaty: Europe: Maastricht Treaty	18 June 1992	2,542,841	1,457,219	57.3	1,001,076	69.1	448,655	30.9	7,488	0.5	
	Permitted the state to ratify the Maastricht Treaty (the Treaty on European Union).												
12th Amendment Bill	N/A	Abortion: exclusion of suicide	25 November 1992	2,542,841	1,733,309	68.2	572,177	34.6	1,079,297	65.4	81,835	4.7	
	Proposed to specify that a pregnancy may be terminated in the case of a real and substantial risk of life to the mother, but not in the case of a risk of suicide. This would have reversed part of the 1992 Supreme Court judgment in the X Case, which had held that abortion was permissible in the case of a risk of suicide.												
13th Amendment	23 December 1992	Abortion: right to travel	25 November 1992	2,542,841	1,733,821	68.2	1,035,308	62.4	624,059	37.6	74,454	4.3	
	Specified that the prohibition of abortion would not limit freedom of travel in and out of the state. Repealed on 18 September 2018, upon enactment of the 36th Amendment.												
14th Amendment	23 December 1992	Abortion: right to information	25 November 1992	2,542,841	1,732,433	68.1	992,833	59.9	665,106	40.1	74,494	4.3	
	Specified that the prohibition of abortion would not limit the right to distribute information about abortion services in foreign countries. Repealed on 18 September 2018, upon enactment of the 36th Amendment.												
15th Amendment	17 June 1996	Rights: Divorce	24 November 1995	2,628,834	1,633,942	62.2	818,842	50.3	809,728	49.7	5,372	0.3	
	Removed the constitutional ban on divorce, but retained certain restrictions on its occurrence.												
16th Amendment	12 December 1996	Rights: bail restrictions	28 November 1996	2,659,895	777,586	29.2	579,740	74.8	194,968	25.2	2,878	0.4	
	Permitted a court to refuse someone bail if it suspected they would commit a serious criminal offence while at liberty. This reversed a 1965 Supreme Court ruling.												
17th Amendment	14 November 1997	Cabinet confidentiality	30 October 1997	2,688,316	1,268,043	47.2	632,777	52.6	569,175	47.4	66,091	5.2	
	To reverse a 1992 Supreme Court ruling that meetings of the cabinet were absolutely confidential, and to permit the High Court to order the disclosure of cabinet discussions in certain circumstances.												
18th Amendment	3 June 1998	Treaty: Europe: Treaty of Amsterdam	22 May 1998	2,747,088	1,543,930	56.2	932,632	61.7	578,070	38.3	33,228	2.2	
	Allowed the state to ratify the Treaty of Amsterdam.												
19th Amendment	3 June 1998 / 2 December 1999 (Note: The first date is that of the Act making the initial amendment; the second is that of the government announcement triggering the subsequent amendment.)	Treaty: Good Friday Agreement	22 May 1998	2,747,088	1,545,395	56.3	1,442,583	94.4	85,748	5.6	17,064	1.1	
	Allowed the state to be bound by the Good Friday Agreement and provided for the conditional amendment of Articles 2 and 3 of the Constitution, which subsequently came into effect on the implementation of the Good Friday Agreement.												
20th Amendment	23 June 1999	Elections: Local government	11 June 1999	2,791,415	1,425,881	51.1	1,024,850	77.8	291,965	22.2	109,066	7.6	
	Provided that local government elections must occur every five years.												
21st Amendment	27 March 2002	Rights: Death penalty	7 June 2001	2,867,960	997,885	34.8	610,455	62.1	372,950	37.9	14,480	1.5	
	Introduced a constitutional ban on legislation for capital punishment, even in a time of national emergency.												
22nd Amendment Bill	N/A	Courts: judges: discipline	N/A										
	Proposed to establish a body for the investigation of judges and to amend the procedure for the removal of judges. It was introduced to the Oireachtas but lapsed after its second stage.												
23rd Amendment	27 March 2002	Treaty: Rome Statute of the ICC	7 June 2001	2,867,960	997,565	34.8	629,234	64.2	350,512	35.8	17,819	1.8	
	Allowed the state to ratify the Statute of the International Criminal Court.												
24th Amendment Bill	N/A	Treaty: Europe: Treaty of Nice	7 June 2001	2,867,960	997,826	34.8	453,461	46.1	529,478	53.9	14,887	1.5	
	Proposed to allow the state to ratify the Treaty of Nice. Voters reversed this decision when they adopted the Twenty-sixth Amendment in 2002.												
25th Amendment Bill	N/A	Abortion: exclusion of suicide	6 March 2002	2,923,918	1,254,175	42.9	618,485	49.6	629,041	50.4	6,649	0.5	
	This was a second attempt to strengthen the constitutional ban on abortion and to prevent risk of suicide being invoked as grounds for an abortion.												
26th Amendment	7 November 2002	Treaty: Europe: Treaty of Nice	19 October 2002	2,923,918	1,446,588	49.5	906,317	62.9	534,887	37.1	5,384	0.4	
	Allowed the state to ratify the Nice Treaty.												
27th Amendment	24 June 2004	Irish nationality	11 June 2004	3,041,688	1,823,434	59.9	1,427,520	79.2	375,695	20.8	20,219	1.1	
	Abolished constitutional jus soli right to Irish nationality.												
28th Amendment Bill	N/A	Treaty: Europe: Treaty of Lisbon	12 June 2008	3,051,278	1,621,037	53.1	752,451	46.6	862,415	53.4	6,171	0.4	
	Proposed to allow the state to ratify the Treaty of Lisbon. Voters reversed this decision when they adopted the Twenty-eighth Amendment in 2009.												
28th Amendment	15 October 2009	Treaty: Europe: Treaty of Lisbon	2 October 2009	3,078,032	1,816,098	58.0	1,214,268	67.1	594,606	32.9	7,224	0.4	
	Allowed the state to ratify the Treaty of Lisbon.												
29th Amendment	17 November 2011	Courts: judges: remuneration	27 October 2011	3,191,157	1,785,707	55.9	1,393,877	79.7	354,134	20.3	37,696	2.1	
	Relaxed the prohibition on the reduction of the salaries of Irish judges.												
30th Amendment Bill	N/A	Oireachtas inquiries	27 October 2011	3,191,157	1,785,208	55.9	812,008	46.7	928,175	53.3	45,025	2.5	
	Proposed to reverse a 2002 Supreme Court ruling which prevented Oireachtas inquiries from making findings critical of individuals called to give evidence.												
30th Amendment	27 June 2012	Treaty: Europe: European Fiscal Compact	31 May 2012	3,144,828	1,591,385	50.6	955,091	60.3	629,088	39.7	7,206	0.5	
	Allowed the state to ratify the European Fiscal Compact.												
31st Amendment	28 April 2015	Rights: Children	10 November 2012	3,183,686	1,066,239	33.5	615,731	58.0	445,863	42.0	4,645	0.4	
	A general statement of children's rights, and a provision intended to secure the power of the state to take children into care who are at risk of abuse or neglect from their parents.												
32nd Amendment Bill	N/A	Seanad: abolition	4 October 2013	3,167,484	1,240,729	39.2	591,937	48.3	634,437	51.7	14,355	1.2	
	Proposed to abolish Seanad Éireann.												
33rd Amendment	1 November 2013	Courts: new Court of Appeal	4 October 2013	3,167,484	1,240,135	39.2	795,008	65.2	425,047	34.8	20,080	1.6	
	Mandates a new Court of Appeal above the High Court and below the Supreme Court.												
34th Amendment	29 August 2015	Rights: Same-sex marriage	22 May 2015	3,221,681	1,949,725	60.5	1,201,607	62.1	734,300	37.9	13,818	0.7	
	Prohibits restriction on civil marriage based on sex (civil partnership had been established under a 2010 statute).												
35th Amendment Bill	N/A	Presidency: reduce age of candidacy to 21.	22 May 2015	3,221,681	1,949,438	60.5	520,898	26.9	1,412,602	73.1	15,938	0.8	
	Proposed to lower the minimum age for the presidency from 35 to 21.												
36th Amendment	18 September 2018	Abortion: Repeal of the 8th Amendment	25 May 2018	3,367,556	2,159,655	64.1	1,429,981	66.4	723,632	33.6	6,042	0.3	
	Removed clauses added by the 8th, 13th, and 14th Amendments of the Constitution and allowed the Oireachtas to legislate for the regulation of termination of pregnancy.												
37th Amendment	27 November 2018	Blasphemy	26 October 2018	3,401,652	1,489,694	43.9	951,650	64.9	515,808	35.1	22,236	1.5	
	Removed the offence of publication or utterance of blasphemous matter from the Constitution.												
38th Amendment	11 June 2019	Rights: Divorce	24 May 2019	3,397,636	1,686,511	50.9	1,384,192	82.1	302,319	17.9	40,545	2.4	
	Removed the requirement of a period of separation before proceedings for divorce are initiated, and allowed for recognition of foreign divorces.												
39th Amendment Bill	N/A	Family: Non-marital relationships	8 March 2024	3,438,566	1,525,215	44.4	487,564	32.3	1,021,546	67.7	16,105	1.1	
	Proposal to expand recognition of the family to include durable relationships.												
40th Amendment Bill	N/A	Family: Care	8 March 2024	3,438,566	1,525,221	44.4	393,053	26.1	1,114,620	73.9	17,548	1.15	
	Proposal to remove reference to woman's life within the home and mothers' duties in the home, and to insert new provision on care within the family.												

== Proposed amendments ==
A referendum was planned to be held on 7 June 2024 on ratification of the Agreement on the Unified Patent Court. However, in April 2024, the government indicated that it was considering postponing the referendum.

The following bills have been on the order paper for consideration in the Oireachtas.

Proposal	Proposer	Progress
Right to Housing	Solidarity–People Before Profit	First Stage 28 July 2020
Franchise at presidential elections	Minister for Foreign Affairs	First Stage 16 September 2019; Restored to Order Paper July 2020

== Referendums affecting court decisions ==
=== Rights of defendants and trial rights ===
In People (AG) v. O'Callaghan (1966), the Supreme Court held that the right to liberty would permit the denial of bail in limited circumstances only, where there was sufficient evidence before the Court that the accused was likely to interfere with the course of justice; specifically, that bail could not be because of the likelihood of the commission of further offences while on bail. This decision was overturned by the Sixteenth Amendment in 1996 which inserted Article 40.4.7°, allowing for the refusal of bail by a court to a person charged with a serious offence where it is reasonably considered necessary to prevent the commission of a serious offence by that person. The Amendment was passed by 75% to 25%.

In Maguire v. Ardagh (2002), the Supreme Court held that Oireachtas Inquiries did not have the power to compel witnesses to attend and to make findings against them. The Thirtieth Amendment of the Constitution Bill 2011 proposed to allow Oireachtas Inquiries to make findings of fact and to balance the rights of the individual against the public interest; this referendum was defeated by 53% to 47%.

=== Electoral matters ===
In O'Donovan v. the Attorney-General (1961), the Supreme Court held that the Electoral Amendment Act 1959 was unconstitutional and suggested that the ratio of representation to population across constituencies should differ by no more than 5%. The Third Amendment of the Constitution Bill 1968 would have allowed a variation of up to 16.7% across constituencies. It was rejected in a referendum by 61% to 39%.

In Re Article 26 and the Electoral (Amendment) Bill 1983 (1984), the Supreme Court held that the proposed bill to extend voting rights in Dáil elections to British citizens was unconstitutional. The Ninth Amendment was passed in June 1984, which allowed the franchise to be extended beyond Irish citizens.

=== International sovereignty ===
The Third Amendment, passed in 1972, allowed Ireland to accede to the European Communities. In 1986, the government signed the Single European Act (SEA). However, Raymond Crotty sought an injunction against ratification by the state. In Crotty v. An Taoiseach (1987), the Supreme Court held that the further transfer of powers from the state to the European institutions within the SEA was not "necessitated by the obligations of membership of the Communities" as provided for by the Third Amendment. Consequently, the Constitution required further amendment, before the SEA could be ratified. This was done in a referendum later in 1987. On the same basis, further referendums on European Treaties were held on the Maastricht Treaty (in 1992), on the Amsterdam Treaty (in 1998), on the Nice Treaty (in 2001 and in 2002), and on the Lisbon Treaty (in 2008 and in 2009). Referendums were also held to the allow the State to be bound by the Good Friday Agreement in 1998, and to ratify the International Criminal Court in 2001 and the Stability Treaty in 2012.

=== Abortion ===
In McGee v. The Attorney General (1974), the Supreme Court found that provisions of Articles 40 and 41 guaranteed a right to marital privacy, and that contraception on prescription could not be prohibited to a married couple. In Griswold v. Connecticut (1965), the United States Supreme Court came to a similar result, before finding for a general right to abortion in the first trimester in Roe v. Wade (1973). The Eighth Amendment in 1983 gave constitutional protection to the life of the unborn, and therefore prohibiting abortion. This had been partly to guard against the Supreme Court finding the same right that their American counterparts had.

In March 1992, the Supreme Court ruled in Attorney General v X, commonly known as the X Case, that a teenage girl was entitled to an abortion as there was a risk to her life from suicide. Opponents of abortion feared that this ruling could only be enforced in a way that would lead to an expansive abortion regime of the kind found in many other countries. There were two failed amendments that would have excluded suicide as grounds for abortion, the Twelfth Amendment of the Constitution Bill 1992 and the Twenty-fifth Amendment of the Constitution Bill 2001. The Protection of Life During Pregnancy Act 2013 made provisions for the finding of the court in the X Case, allowing abortion where the life of the woman was at risk, including a risk of suicide.

The Thirteenth Amendment was passed in 1992, to guarantee a right to travel. This addressed the injunction which the High Court had granted in the X Case to order the return of the girl to the country. Though the injunction was lifted by the Supreme Court, a majority of the Court had found that were it not for the risk to life of the defendant, an injunction would have been maintained.

The Fourteenth Amendment was passed on the same day in 1992, to guarantee that the ban on abortion would not limit freedom to obtain or make available information relating to services lawfully available in another state. This was in response to two cases: Attorney General (Society for the Protection of Unborn Children (Ireland) Ltd.) v Open Door Counselling Ltd. and Dublin Wellwoman Centre Ltd. (1988), which granted an injunction restraining two counseling agencies from assisting women to travel abroad to obtain abortions or informing them of the methods of communications with such clinics, and Society for the Protection of Unborn Children (Ireland) Ltd. v Grogan (1989), which placed an injunction restraining three students' unions from distributing information in relation to abortion available outside the state.

The Eighth Amendment was repealed in 2018 with the passage of the Thirty-sixth Amendment, thus allowing abortion to be legalised again.

== Amendments to previous constitutions ==
Before the adoption of the Constitution of Ireland, Ireland had two previous Constitutions: the Dáil Constitution of the short-lived 1919–1922 Irish Republic, and the constitution of the 1922–1937 Irish Free State.

The Dáil Constitution was enacted by Dáil Éireann (which was at that time a single chamber assembly).

The Constitution of the Irish Free State was adopted in October 1922 and came in force on 6 December 1922. It originally provided for a process of amendment by means of a referendum. However the constitution could initially be amended by the Oireachtas for eight years. The Oireachtas chose to extend that period, meaning that for the duration of its existence, the Free State constitution could be amended at will by parliament. By virtue of the 1922 Constitution Act, the constitution could not be amended in a way with conflicted with the Anglo-Irish Treaty of 1921 ratified by both the United Kingdom and the Irish Republic. However the Statute of Westminster removed that restriction in 1931 as far as British (but not Irish) law was concerned. It was amended 24 times between 1925 and 1936.

== Party positions on past referendums ==
Party	Nice I	Nice II	Lisbon I	Lisbon II	Same-sex marriage	Abortion	Blasphemy	Divorce	The Family and Care
Fianna Fáil	check	check	check	check	check	Neutral	check	check	check
Sinn Féin	X mark	X mark	X mark	X mark	check	check	check	check	check
Fine Gael	check	check	check	check	check	Neutral	check	check	check
Green	X mark	X mark	Mixed	check	check	check	check	check	check
Labour	check	check	check	check	check	check	check	check	check
Social Democrats					check	check	check	check	check
PBP–Solidarity	X mark	X mark	X mark	X mark	check	check	check	check	check
