= Sixteenth Amendment of the Constitution of Ireland =

Amendment allowing for the refusal of bail

- 28 November 1996
- To provide that a court could refuse bail in certain circumstances

Results
Choice	Votes	%
Yes	579,740	74.83%
No	194,968	25.17%
Valid votes	774,708	99.63%
Invalid or blank votes	2,878	0.37%
Total votes	777,586	100.00%
Registered voters/turnout	2,659,895	29.23%

The Sixteenth Amendment of the Constitution Act 1996 (previously bill no. 49 of 1996) is an amendment of the Constitution of Ireland which provides that a court can refuse bail to a suspect where it feared that while at liberty they would commit a serious criminal offence. It was approved by referendum on 28 November 1996 and signed into law on 12 December of the same year.

== Background ==
In People (AG) v O'Callaghan (1966), the Supreme Court had ruled that the provisions of Article 40.4, which guarantees personal liberty and the principle of habeas corpus, meant that an individual charged with a crime could only be refused bail if they were likely to flee or to interfere with witnesses or evidence. In a 1976 Dáil debate on "the breakdown in law and order", Paddy Cooney, the Minister for Justice in the Fine Gael–Labour coalition, said the government favoured a referendum on reducing the right to bail.

A Law Reform Commission report published in August 1995 and chaired by former Supreme Court judge Anthony Hederman considered legal approaches to bail. The Sixteenth Amendment made it possible for a court to take into account whether or not a person had committed serious crimes while on bail in the past. The amendment was introduced by the Fine Gael–Labour Party–Democratic Left government led by Taoiseach John Bruton.

== Changes to the text ==
Insertion of new Article 40.4.7°:

Provision may be made by law for the refusal of bail by a court to a person charged with a serious offence where it is reasonably considered necessary to prevent the commission of a serious offence by that person.

Note: This provision was renumbered as 40.4.6° by the Twenty-first Amendment of the Constitution of Ireland in 2002.

== Oireachtas debate ==
A similar proposal had been proposed by Fianna Fáil Justice Spokesperson John O'Donoghue on 8 June 1995. On 4 October 1995, this was rejected by 65 votes to 47.

On 16 October 1996, Minister for Justice Nora Owen proposed the Sixteenth Amendment of the Constitution Bill 1996. It was supported by the two major opposition parties, Fianna Fáil and the Progressive Democrats, and passed final stages in the Dáil on the same day. It passed final stages in the Seanad on 23 October and proceeded to a referendum on 28 November 1996.

== Result ==
Sixteenth Amendment of the Constitution of Ireland referendum
Choice	Votes	%
For	579,740	74.83
Against	194,968	25.17
Total	774,708	100.00
Valid votes	774,708	99.63
Invalid/blank votes	2,878	0.37
Total votes	777,586	100.00
Registered voters/turnout	2,659,895	29.23

Results by constituency
Constituency	Electorate	Turnout (%)	Votes		Proportion of votes	
Constituency	Electorate	Turnout (%)	Yes	No	Yes	No
Carlow–Kilkenny	85,589	30.1%	19,413	6,242	75.7%	24.3%
Cavan–Monaghan	81,466	24.4%	14,573	5,201	73.7%	26.3%
Clare	68,641	27.0%	13,626	4,828	73.9%	26.1%
Cork East	61,966	31.5%	14,368	5,114	73.8%	26.2%
Cork North-Central	70,935	28.4%	13,753	6,348	68.5%	31.5%
Cork North-West	46,310	33.8%	11,722	3,857	75.3%	24.7%
Cork South-Central	81,420	33.3%	18,822	8,183	69.7%	30.3%
Cork South-West	46,607	32.2%	11,323	3,631	75.8%	24.2%
Donegal North-East	50,366	18.0%	5,818	3,191	64.6%	35.4%
Donegal South-West	50,677	18.4%	6,289	2,992	67.8%	32.2%
Dublin Central	59,526	29.7%	12,361	5,267	70.2%	29.8%
Dublin North	69,954	32.2%	17,388	5,129	77.3%	22.7%
Dublin North-Central	63,725	37.1%	17,548	6,066	74.4%	25.6%
Dublin North-East	58,653	33.5%	14,967	4,644	76.4%	23.6%
Dublin North-West	55,794	31.1%	12,827	4,453	74.3%	25.7%
Dublin South	88,699	35.8%	23,388	8,288	73.9%	26.1%
Dublin South-Central	59,930	34.2%	15,088	5,316	74.0%	26.0%
Dublin South-East	64,134	30.6%	12,620	6,917	64.6%	35.4%
Dublin South-West	74,176	26.9%	15,324	4,611	76.9%	23.1%
Dublin West	65,235	27.5%	14,095	3,792	78.9%	21.1%
Dún Laoghaire	89,767	34.5%	21,646	9,216	70.2%	29.8%
Galway East	44,108	25.6%	9,007	2,216	80.3%	19.7%
Galway West	84,202	24.6%	15,256	5,363	74.0%	26.0%
Kerry North	50,303	25.7%	9,314	3,523	72.6%	27.4%
Kerry South	46,459	26.9%	9,170	3,287	73.7%	26.3%
Kildare	85,932	28.7%	19,171	5,415	78.0%	22.0%
Laois–Offaly	82,054	28.9%	18,007	5,612	76.3%	23.7%
Limerick East	74,746	29.8%	17,472	4,764	78.6%	21.4%
Limerick West	46,385	28.5%	10,468	2,648	79.9%	20.1%
Longford–Roscommon	62,324	29.5%	14,714	3,561	80.6%	19.4%
Louth	69,725	26.1%	13,445	4,634	74.4%	25.6%
Mayo East	44,474	25.4%	8,897	2,356	79.1%	20.9%
Mayo West	46,368	25.3%	9,018	2,686	77.1%	22.9%
Meath	85,805	27.3%	18,020	5,265	77.4%	22.6%
Sligo–Leitrim	62,433	28.3%	13,502	4,105	76.7%	23.3%
Tipperary North	44,488	32.3%	11,112	3,187	77.8%	22.2%
Tipperary South	59,120	31.8%	14,492	4,253	77.4%	22.6%
Waterford	67,002	27.0%	13,209	4,830	73.3%	26.7%
Westmeath	46,925	28.3%	10,177	3,059	76.9%	23.1%
Wexford	81,251	29.4%	19,002	4,781	79.9%	20.1%
Wicklow	82,221	31.2%	19,378	6,137	76.0%	24.0%
Total	2,659,895	29.2%	579,740	194,968	74.8%	25.2%

== Aftermath ==
The Bail Act 1997 was passed as the provision to be made by law arising from the amendment.
