= Ninth Amendment of the Constitution of Ireland =

Amendment granting non-Irish citizens suffrage

- 14 June 1984
- To allow non-Irish citizens to vote in general elections

Results
Choice	Votes	%
Yes	828,483	75.40%
No	270,250	24.60%
Valid votes	1,098,733	96.47%
Invalid or blank votes	40,162	3.53%
Total votes	1,138,895	100.00%
Registered voters/turnout	2,399,257	47.47%

The Ninth Amendment of the Constitution Act 1984 (previously bill no. 11 of 1984) is an amendment to the Constitution of Ireland that allowed for the extension of the right to vote in elections to Dáil Éireann (the house of representatives of the Oireachtas) to non-Irish citizens. It was approved by referendum on 14 June 1984, the same day as the European Parliament election, and signed into law on 2 August of the same year.

== Background ==
Article 16 of the Constitution of Ireland as approved in 1937, and amended in 1972 to lower the voting age, provided that the franchise for elections to Dáil Éireann would be citizens who have reached the age of 18. The Electoral Amendment Bill 1983, proposed by the Fine Gael–Labour Party government led by Taoiseach Garret FitzGerald, would have amended the Electoral Act 1963 to allow British citizens as defined by the British Nationality Act 1981 to vote in elections to Dáil Éireann. This was to reciprocate the Representation of the People Act 1949, a British statute, which among other provisions had granted Irish citizens resident in the United Kingdom the right to vote in elections to the British parliament.

The Bill was referred by President Patrick Hillery to the Supreme Court under Article 26 of the Constitution. In a judgment delivered on 8 February 1984, they found the bill to be unconstitutional.

In response, the government then proposed a constitutional amendment which would specifically allow the franchise in elections to Dáil Éireann to be extended to non-Irish citizens. This did not affect presidential elections or referendums, where the text of the Constitution continued to specify citizens only.

== Changes to the text ==
Deletion of the entirety of Article 16.1.2°:

Every citizen without distinction of sex who has reached the age of eighteen years who is not disqualified by law and complies with the provisions of the law relating to the election of members of Dáil Éireann, shall have the right to vote at an election for members of Dáil Éireann.

Substitution of new Article 16.1.2°:

i. All citizens, and

ii. such other persons in the State as may be determined by law,

without distinction of sex who have reached the age of eighteen years who are not disqualified by law and comply with the provisions of the law relating to the election of members of Dáil Éireann, shall have the right to vote at an election for members of Dáil Éireann.

Amendment to Article 16.1.3° by the addition of the text in bold:

No law shall be enacted placing any citizen under disability or incapacity for membership of Dáil Éireann on the ground of sex or disqualifying any citizen or any other person from voting at an election for members of Dáil Éireann on that ground.

== Oireachtas debates ==
The Ninth Amendment of the Constitution Bill 1984 was proposed by Minister for the Environment Liam Kavanagh on 11 April 1984. It had the support of opposition party Fianna Fáil and passed all stages of the Dáil without amendment on that day. It passed all stages of the Seanad on the same day.

== Information to voters ==
Under the provisions of the Referendum Act 1984, the changes was described on the polling card sent to voters as:

The Ninth Amendment of the Constitution Bill, 1984, proposes to extend the right conferred on citizens to vote at elections for members of Dáil Éireann to such other persons in the State who have reached the age of 18 years as may be specified by legislation enacted by the Oireachtas.

== Result ==
Ninth Amendment of the Constitution of Ireland referendum
Choice	Votes	%
For	828,483	75.40
Against	270,250	24.60
Total	1,098,733	100.00
Valid votes	1,098,733	96.47
Invalid/blank votes	40,162	3.53
Total votes	1,138,895	100.00
Registered voters/turnout	2,399,257	47.47
Source: Referendum Results 1937–2015

Results by constituency
Constituency	Electorate	Turnout (%)	Votes		Proportion of votes	
Constituency	Electorate	Turnout (%)	Yes	No	Yes	No
County Carlow	27,838	45.7%	9,272	3,077	75.1%	24.9%
County Cavan	39,012	54.8%	15,228	5,114	74.9%	25.1%
County Clare	62,782	51.7%	25,119	6,082	80.6%	19.4%
Cork City	90,442	39.4%	26,325	8,269	76.1%	23.9%
County Cork	182,816	56.5%	76,884	22,431	77.5%	22.5%
County Donegal	89,072	55.0%	31,950	13,991	69.6%	30.4%
Dublin City	379,501	39.8%	107,191	40,347	72.7%	27.3%
County Dublin	319,818	42.2%	99,771	32,710	75.4%	24.6%
County Galway	124,762	39.5%	37,422	10,092	78.8%	21.2%
County Kerry	86,653	48.2%	29,625	10,189	74.5%	25.5%
County Kildare	71,584	41.5%	22,491	6,510	77.6%	22.4%
County Kilkenny	48,538	47.5%	17,384	4,833	78.3%	21.7%
County Laois	34,472	63.1%	15,774	5,206	75.2%	24.8%
County Leitrim	20,887	68.4%	9,721	3,745	72.2%	27.8%
Limerick City	39,034	42.3%	12,258	3,723	76.8%	23.2%
County Limerick	70,625	51.8%	27,825	7,259	79.4%	20.6%
County Longford	21,704	50.0%	7,965	2,320	77.5%	22.5%
County Louth	60,448	45.4%	18,128	8,288	68.7%	31.3%
County Mayo	83,217	51.1%	31,966	8,945	78.2%	21.8%
County Meath	66,974	50.3%	24,529	7,932	75.6%	24.4%
County Monaghan	35,885	54.2%	12,875	5,367	70.6%	29.4%
County Offaly	39,615	67.1%	18,987	6,452	74.7%	25.3%
County Roscommon	38,741	53.4%	15,638	4,259	78.6%	21.4%
County Sligo	38,822	59.5%	17,045	5,154	76.8%	23.2%
North Tipperary	41,103	55.5%	16,629	5,258	76.0%	24.0%
South Tipperary	52,631	55.3%	22,047	5,875	79.0%	21.0%
Waterford City	24,988	42.9%	7,678	2,738	73.8%	26.2%
County Waterford	35,064	48.4%	12,507	3,760	76.9%	23.1%
County Westmeath	42,255	46.9%	14,669	4,433	76.8%	23.2%
County Wexford	68,455	51.3%	23,948	9,778	71.1%	28.9%
County Wicklow	61,519	42.8%	19,632	6,113	76.3%	23.7%
Total	2,399,257	47.5%	828,483	270,250	75.4%	24.6%

Note: For this referendum, the constituencies used were each county and county borough (city), which were deemed under section 2 of the Referendum (Amendment) Act 1984 to be constituencies for the purpose of the poll. Usually in Irish referendums the Dáil Éireann general election constituencies are used.

== Aftermath ==
The Electoral (Amendment) Act 1985 was passed the following year. This amended the Electoral Act 1963 to grant the vote to British citizens. It also allowed the Minister for the Environment to extend the franchise to citizens of a member of the European Communities on a reciprocal basis. To date, no such order has been made for any other country.

== See also ==
- Irish nationality law
- Citizenship
- Politics of the Republic of Ireland
- History of the Republic of Ireland
- Constitutional amendment
