= Twenty-second Amendment of the Constitution Bill 2001 =

Proposal constitutional amendment on judicial investigation and impeachment

The Twenty-second Amendment of the Constitution Bill 2001 was a proposed bill introduced by the government of the 28th Dáil to amend the Constitution of Ireland, to establish a body for the investigation of judges, and to alter the procedure for the removal of judges.

The impetus for the bill was the Philip Sheedy affair. Sheedy's 1997 prison sentence was remitted in an irregular manner in 1998 by one judge after intervention from another judge acquainted with Sheedy's sister. The media broke the story in 1999 and the government responded to the controversy by asking the Chief Justice to make a report, which criticised the conduct of both judges, who each resigned after initially stating they would not. The ad-hoc nature of the investigation and the voluntary nature of the sanctions were considered unsatisfactory. In 2000, a report into the affair by the Committee on Court Practice and Procedure declined to make recommendations regarding practice and procedure in criminal courts, because of "serious issue of a constitutional nature relating to the separation of powers".

The bill was published on 27 March 2001, the same day as bills for amendments numbered 21, 23, and 24. The government wanted to expedite passage of all four bills through the Oireachtas to have simultaneous referendums on 7 June, before the summer holidays. The Twenty-second Amendment bill passed its second reading on 1 May 2001, and the committee stage was scheduled for the following day. Overnight, John O'Donoghue, Minister for Justice, Equality and Law Reform, tabled 14 amendments to the bill, a procedure which the opposition condemned as cavalier; in the absence of cross-party support the government withdrew the bill from the Order Paper. It lapsed when the 28th Dáil dissolved. The Twenty-third Amendment passed at referendum; there is therefore a gap in the numbering since there is no Twenty-second Amendment to the Constitution.

In 2010, the Government announced the Judicial Council Bill 2010, which aimed to address the same issues without amending the Constitution.

== See also ==
- Brian Curtin, judge whose removal was discussed in 2002–06
