= Seville Declarations on the Treaty of Nice =

National declaration by the Irish government

On 21 June 2002, the Irish Government made a National Declaration at the Seville European Council emphasising its commitment to the European Union's security and defence policy.

== Background ==
After the first failed Irish referendum on the Treaty of Nice, EU Leaders met to discuss the outcome of the Irish Referendum in Seville (Spanish Presidency of the Council of the European Union). Out of the meeting came declarations known as the Seville Declarations on the Treaty of Nice

At the Seville European Council (21–22 June 2002) the other EU14 governments accepted an Irish declaration that spelled out the triple lock - UN mandate; cabinet approval; Dáil Éireann approval - on Irish participation in EU activities of a military nature. The triple lock was nothing new as the Government never deployed Irish defence forces without UN approval to maintain Military neutrality, and moreover the declaration had no legal status, so this measure on the part of the Irish government must be understood primarily as a political signal to the Irish electorate. In response to the Irish declaration, the European Council issued a declaration of its own. It recognised the right of Ireland (and all other member states) to decide in accordance with National Constitutions and laws whether and how to participate in any activities under the European Security and Defence Policy.

It led to the second Irish referendum on the Treaty of Nice.

== National Declaration by Ireland to the EU Council – Seville, 21 June 2002 ==
1. Ireland reaffirms its attachment to the aims and principles of Charter of the United Nations, which confers primary responsibility for the maintenance of international peace and security upon the United Nations Security Council.
2. Ireland recalls its commitment to the common foreign and security policy of the European Union as set out in the Treaty on European Union, adopted at Maastricht, amended at Amsterdam and approved on each occasion by the Irish people through referendum.
3. Ireland confirms that its participation in the European Unions common foreign and security policy does not prejudice its traditional policy of military neutrality. The Treaty on European Union makes clear that the Union's security and defence policy shall not prejudice the specific character of the security and defence policy of certain Member States.
4. In line with its traditional policy of military neutrality, Ireland is not bound by any mutual defence commitment. Nor is Ireland party to any plans to develop a European army. Indeed, the Nice European Council recognised that the development of the Union's capacity to conduct humanitarian and crisis management tasks does not involve the establishment of a European Army.
5. The Treaty on European Union specifies that any decision by the Union to move to a common defence would have to be taken by unanimous decision of the Member States and adopted in accordance with their respective constitutional requirements. The Government of Ireland have made a firm commitment to the people of Ireland, solemnized in this Declaration, that a referendum will be held in Ireland on the adoption of any such decision and on any future Treaty which would involve Ireland departing from its traditional policy of military neutrality.
6. Ireland reiterates that the participation of contingents of the Irish Defence Forces in overseas operations, including those carried out under the European security and defence policy, requires (a) the authorisation of the operation by the Security Council or the General Assembly of the United Nations, (b) the agreement of the Irish Government and (c) the approval of Dáil Éireann, in accordance with Irish law.
7. The situation set out in this Declaration would be unaffected by the entry into force of the Treaty of Nice. In the event of Ireland's ratification of the Treaty of Nice, this Declaration will be associated with Ireland's instrument of ratification.

== Declaration of the European Council ==
1. The European Council takes cognizance of the National Declaration of Ireland presented at its meeting in Seville on 21–22 June 2002. It notes that Ireland intends to associate its National Declaration with its act of ratification of the Treaty of Nice, should the people of Ireland in a referendum decide to accept the Treaty of Nice.
2. The European Council notes that the Treaty on European Union provides that any decision to move to a common defence shall be adopted in accordance with the respective constitutional requirements of the Member States
3. The European Council recalls that under the terms of the Treaty on European Union the policy of the Union shall not prejudice the specific character of the security and defence policy of certain Member States. Ireland has drawn attention, in this regard, to its traditional policy of Military Neutrality.
4. The European Council acknowledges that the Treaty on European Union does not impose any binding mutual defence commitments. Nor does the development of the Union's capacity to conduct humanitarian and crisis management tasks involve the establishment of a European Army.
5. The European Council confirms that the situation referred to in paragraphs 2, 3 and 4 above would be unchanged by the entry into force of the Treaty of Nice.
6. The European Council recognises that, like all Member States of the Union, Ireland would retain the right, following the entry into force of the Treaty of Nice, to take its own sovereign decision, in accordance with its Constitution and its laws, on whether to commit military personnel to participate in any operation carried out under the European Security and Defence Policy. Ireland, in its national Statement, has clearly set out its position in this regard.

== See also ==
- Irish neutrality
