= 2001 Irish constitutional referendums =

Referendums on the death penalty, the Nice Treaty and the ICC

Three referendums were held simultaneously in Ireland on 7 June 2001, each on a proposed amendment to the Constitution of Ireland. Two of the measures were approved, while the third was rejected. The two successful amendments concerned the death penalty and the International Criminal Court.

The failed amendment concerned the Treaty of Nice. It has also been intended to submit a fourth proposal to a referendum, concerning the investigation of judges, but this amendment was not ultimately passed by the Oireachtas (parliament) and so was never put to a vote.

== Twenty-first Amendment ==
The Twenty-first Amendment introduced a constitutional ban on the death penalty and removed all references to capital punishment from the text. The proposal was approved.

Twenty-first Amendment of the Constitution of Ireland referendum
Choice	Votes	%
For	610,455	62.08
Against	372,950	37.92
Total	983,405	100.00
Valid votes	983,405	98.55
Invalid/blank votes	14,480	1.45
Total votes	997,885	100.00
Registered voters/turnout	2,867,960	34.79

== Twenty-second Amendment ==
The Twenty-second Amendment Bill proposed to establish a body for the investigation of judges and to amend the procedure for the removal of judges. It was not passed by the houses of the Oireachtas and therefore was not submitted to a referendum. It is a "missing amendment" of the Constitution of Ireland.

== Twenty-third Amendment ==
The Twenty-third Amendment permitted the state to ratify the Rome Statute of the International Criminal Court. The proposal was approved.

Twenty-third Amendment of the Constitution of Ireland referendum
Choice	Votes	%
For	629,234	64.22
Against	350,512	35.78
Total	979,746	100.00
Valid votes	979,746	98.21
Invalid/blank votes	17,819	1.79
Total votes	997,565	100.00
Registered voters/turnout	2,867,960	34.78

== Twenty-fourth Amendment ==
The Twenty-fourth Amendment Bill proposed that the state ratify the Nice Treaty of the European Union. The proposal was rejected.

Twenty-fourth Amendment of the Constitution of Ireland Bill 2001
Choice	Votes	%
For	453,461	46.13
Against	529,478	53.87
Total	982,939	100.00
Valid votes	982,939	98.51
Invalid/blank votes	14,887	1.49
Total votes	997,826	100.00
Registered voters/turnout	2,867,960	34.79

== See also ==
- Constitutional amendment
- Politics of the Republic of Ireland
- History of the Republic of Ireland
