= Thirtieth Amendment of the Constitution of Ireland =

2012 amendment on the European Fiscal Compact

- 31 May 2012
- To permit the state to ratify the European Fiscal Compact

Results
Choice	Votes	%
Yes	955,091	60.37%
No	626,907	39.63%
Valid votes	1,581,998	99.55%
Invalid or blank votes	7,206	0.45%
Total votes	1,589,204	100.00%
Registered voters/turnout	3,144,828	50.53%

Result
1. Yes (60.3%)
2. No (39.7%)

The Thirtieth Amendment of the Constitution (Treaty on Stability, Coordination and Governance in the Economic and Monetary Union) Act 2012 (previously bill no. 23 of 2012) amended the Constitution of Ireland to permit Ireland to ratify the 2012 European Fiscal Compact and to preclude measures taken under the Compact from being held to be inconsistent with the Irish constitution. It was approved by referendum on 31 May 2012, by 60.3% to 39.7%, on a turnout of 50% and was signed into law by President Michael D. Higgins on 27 June 2012.

The decision to hold a referendum on the Fiscal Compact was made by the Irish government following advice from the Attorney General, and was announced by Taoiseach Enda Kenny on 28 February 2012 prior to the signing ceremony.

== Change to the text ==
The following subsection was added to Article 29.4:

10° The State may ratify the Treaty on Stability, Coordination and Governance in the Economic and Monetary Union done at Brussels on the 2nd day of March 2012. No provision of this Constitution invalidates laws enacted, acts done or measures adopted by the State that are necessitated by the obligations of the State under that Treaty or prevents laws enacted, acts done or measures adopted by bodies competent under that Treaty from having the force of law in the State.

== Oireachtas debate ==
The Thirtieth Amendment of the Constitution (Treaty on Stability, Coordination and Governance in the Economic and Monetary Union) Bill was proposed in Dáil Éireann by Tánaiste and Minister for Foreign Affairs and Trade Eamon Gilmore on 18 April 2012. It passed final stage in the Dáil on 20 April and final stages in Seanad Éireann on 24 April.

== High Court challenge ==
In May 2012, Independent TD Thomas Pringle brought a High Court challenge to the Irish European Fiscal Compact referendum. He asked the High Court to check the legality of the referendum as the fiscal treaty is intertwined with the European Stability Mechanism (ESM) treaty and an amendment to another treaty.

== Referendum campaign ==
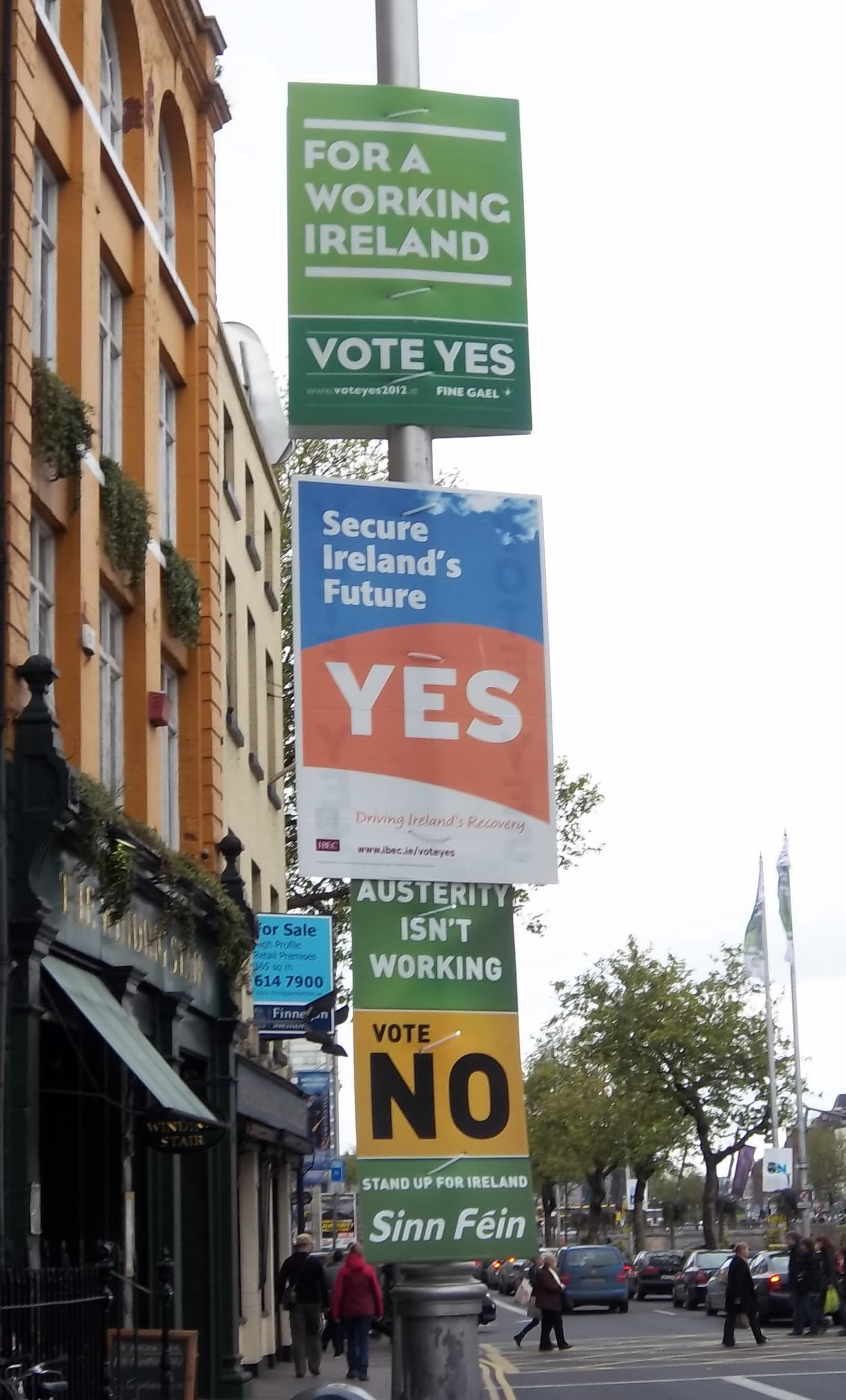
Referendum campaign posters in Dublin

=== Proponents ===
On 27 May, Taoiseach Enda Kenny appealed to voters to support the referendum in order to contribute to a recovery from Ireland's financial crisis. "This treaty strengthens the economic and budgetary rules that apply to countries like Ireland that use the euro. It will create stability in the euro zone that is essential for growth and job creation. A strong yes vote will create the certainty and stability that our country needs to continue on the road to economic recovery."

=== Opponents ===
The No Campaign referred to it as the Austerity Treaty. Sinn Féin leader Gerry Adams promising to lead a "strong anti-treaty campaign" to stop what he described as a pact that would worsen the Irish government's "terrible policy of austerity." Independent TD Shane Ross called for the Irish people to reject the treaty as "the only way to stop a process that would end in Ireland's surrender of economic decision-making." The United Left Alliance also campaigned for a No vote in the 2012 European Fiscal Compact referendum.

On 29 February 2012, Éamon Ó Cuív resigned as Fianna Fáil's Deputy leader and Communications spokesperson due to dissatisfaction with his party's position on the referendum. He vowed to vote against the treaty and said "joining a badly designed monetary union had cost Ireland... the people of Europe do not agree that there is only one way forward." Fianna Fáil party whip Seán Ó Fearghaíl then sent Ó Cuív a letter which put a gag on him during the referendum campaign for speaking out of turn and expressing his own opinion against the party's wishes.

=== Debates ===
TV3 hosted the first live televised debate concerning the European Fiscal Compact referendum. It was an hour-long debate, hosted by Vincent Browne, and airing on 1 May at 21:00. Sinn Féin deputy president Mary Lou McDonald and Joe Higgins of the Socialist Party put the case for a No vote, and while Fianna Fáil leader Micheál Martin and agriculture minister Simon Coveney of Fine Gael called on viewers to vote Yes. Taoiseach Enda Kenny refused to participate in the debate, citing comments made previously by the host. Tánaiste Eamon Gilmore also declined to join the debate.

Lucinda Creighton and Clare Daly appeared on Prime Time while the TV3 debate was happening.

A debate held on The Frontline on 21 May 2012 descended into chaos. Celebrity "Dragon" Norah Casey and Tánaiste Eamon Gilmore represented "Yes", while Declan Ganley and Sinn Féin deputy leader Mary Lou McDonald represented "No". At one stage presenter Pat Kenny shouted down a farmer in the audience who was advocating a No vote.

A 45-minute debate, this time "strictly marshalled" by Richard Crowley, was held on Prime Time on 29 May 2012. Fianna Fáil director of elections Timmy Dooley and Labour's Joan Burton represented "Yes", while the Socialist Party's Clare Daly and Sinn Féin deputy leader Mary Lou McDonald represented "No". Following Richard Bruton's gaffe on live radio (see below), Joan Burton declined repeated attempts to have her say whether Labour would agree to a second referendum in the event of the "No" side prevailing.

=== Notable moments ===
On 19 April 2012, the government launched a website offering information about the treaty. Having claimed that this was a neutral source of information, the government came under pressure to remove some content from the site which explicitly called for a Yes vote. When questioned why, in light of the ruling in the Patricia McKenna case that it was unconstitutional for the government to spend public money to promote one side of a referendum debate, the government was launching a website which contained partisan material, Minister Leo Varadkar replied that as they had launched the website before moving the writ to formally call the referendum, the ruling did not apply. The government was also criticised for diverting millions of euro to fund this website and related leaflet drop from the budget of the Referendum Commission whose role it is to provide unbiased information on referendums in Ireland.

On 16 May, Minister for Finance Michael Noonan caused controversy with a comment of Greek "holidays" and "feta cheese" at a breakfast briefing with Bloomberg news agency. Noonan said these were the only links between Ireland and Greece.

On 17 May, Taoiseach Enda Kenny was heckled and booed by opponents of the compact in Galway as he attended a breakfast briefing. Later that day, Minister for Jobs, Enterprise and Innovation Richard Bruton let slip on radio the possibility of there being a second referendum if the Irish people voted "No".

== Opinion polls ==
Date	Source	Polling agency	Sample size	For	Against	Undecided
26 May 2012	The Irish Times	Ipsos MRBI	1,000	39%	30%	22%
17 May 2012	Irish Independent	Millward Brown Lansdowne	1,000	37%	24%	35% (plus 4% 'will not vote')
13 May 2012	The Sunday Business Post	RED C	1,000	53%	31%	16%
29 April 2012	The Sunday Business Post	RED C	1,000	47%	35%	18%
22 April 2012	The Sunday Times	Behaviour and Attitudes	946	42%	27%	31%
19 April 2012	The Irish Times	Ipsos MRBI	1,000	30%	23%	39% (plus 8% 'will not vote')
25 March 2012	The Sunday Business Post	RED C	1,000	49%	33%	18%
4 March 2012	The Sunday Business Post	RED C	1,000	44%	29%	26%
4 March 2012	Sunday Independent	Millward Brown Lansdowne	?	37%	26%	15% (plus 21% 'depends')
29 January 2012	The Sunday Business Post	RED C	?	40%	36%	24%

== Result ==
How the electorate voted, by constituency. Proportion of the valid poll voting yes: 69%–76% 64%–68.99% 57%–63.99% 50%–56.99% 43%–49.99%

Thirtieth Amendment of the Constitution Bill 2011
Choice	Votes	%
For	955,091	60.37
Against	626,907	39.63
Total	1,581,998	100.00
Valid votes	1,581,998	99.55
Invalid/blank votes	7,206	0.45
Total votes	1,589,204	100.00
Registered voters/turnout	3,144,828	50.53

Results by constituency
Constituency	Electorate	Turnout (%)	Votes		Proportion of votes	
Constituency	Electorate	Turnout (%)	Yes	No	Yes	No
Carlow–Kilkenny	102,643	51.0%	32,920	19,098	63.3%	36.7%
Cavan–Monaghan	97,803	48.8%	27,296	20,106	57.6%	42.4%
Clare	80,102	49.8%	26,121	13,616	65.7%	34.3%
Cork East	81,692	46.5%	24,212	13,616	64.0%	36.0%
Cork North-Central	74,257	51.5%	19,798	18,275	52.0%	48.0%
Cork North-West	61,672	51.9%	20,894	10,961	65.6%	34.4%
Cork South-Central	89,844	53.5%	29,730	18,090	62.2%	37.8%
Cork South-West	59,852	51.5%	20,350	10,360	66.3%	33.7%
Donegal North-East	58,387	42.6%	10,975	13,758	44.4%	55.6%
Donegal South-West	63,127	41.9%	11,862	14,466	45.1%	54.9%
Dublin Central	55,092	48.3%	14,183	12,312	53.5%	46.5%
Dublin Mid-West	64,445	51.6%	16,590	16,585	50.0%	50.0%
Dublin North	69,533	52.9%	22,153	14,507	60.4%	39.6%
Dublin North-Central	52,799	58.8%	19,250	11,660	62.3%	37.7%
Dublin North-East	57,175	57.2%	18,890	13,679	58.0%	42.0%
Dublin North-West	48,352	51.9%	11,682	13,302	46.8%	53.2%
Dublin South	101,451	57.1%	43,735	13,931	75.8%	24.2%
Dublin South-Central	77,869	51.7%	19,706	20,428	49.1%	50.9%
Dublin South-East	56,037	48.8%	19,682	7,539	72.3%	27.7%
Dublin South-West	69,872	51.0%	17,531	18,028	49.3%	50.7%
Dublin West	61,762	51.7%	18,503	13,300	58.2%	41.8%
Dún Laoghaire	78,655	57.2%	33,242	11,554	74.2%	25.8%
Galway East	81,587	46.8%	24,015	13,955	63.2%	36.8%
Galway West	87,456	48.2%	24,282	17,645	57.9%	42.1%
Kerry North–West Limerick	62,271	47.2%	17,800	11,403	61.0%	39.0%
Kerry South	57,146	48.3%	17,727	9,685	64.7%	35.3%
Kildare North	75,513	51.2%	25,169	13,384	65.3%	34.7%
Kildare South	57,790	49.6%	16,678	11,902	58.4%	41.6%
Laois–Offaly	106,297	48.6%	30,655	20,741	59.6%	40.4%
Limerick	64,419	48.3%	20,459	10,491	66.1%	33.9%
Limerick City	64,241	48.8%	18,933	12,262	60.7%	39.3%
Longford–Westmeath	85,159	46.7%	23,886	15,723	60.3%	39.7%
Louth	99,008	52.2%	27,114	24,289	52.7%	47.3%
Mayo	96,158	47.8%	30,738	14,977	67.2%	32.8%
Meath East	64,178	49.0%	19,613	11,697	62.6%	37.4%
Meath West	62,232	47.6%	16,661	12,785	56.6%	43.4%
Roscommon–South Leitrim	59,020	52.0%	18,562	11,991	60.8%	39.2%
Sligo–North Leitrim	61,892	48.0%	17,828	11,728	60.3%	39.7%
Tipperary North	62,044	54.0%	21,819	11,454	65.6%	34.4%
Tipperary South	55,717	53.0%	17,797	11,546	60.7%	39.3%
Waterford	76,993	51.1%	22,585	16,585	57.7%	42.3%
Wexford	110,302	48.9%	31,039	22,654	57.8%	42.2%
Wicklow	92,984	57.5%	32,426	20,839	60.9%	39.1%
Total	3,144,828	50.5%	955,091	626,907	60.4%	39.6%
