= Nominating petition =

Requirement for candidates to gain ballot access in certain elections

A nominating petition is required in some jurisdictions, particularly in the United States of America, in order for an independent or non-major-party candidate to gain ballot access. A certain number of valid signatures is typically prescribed by statute in order for the candidate to get on the ballot. Thus, it is necessary to get an overage of "raw" signatures (perhaps twice as many as the statutory requirement) in order to assure getting on the ballot, as some signatures may be illegible, incomplete, of individuals not registered to vote, or not in the candidate's electoral district, or otherwise invalid. Paid petitioners sometimes assist in gathering signatures.

The form of a nominating petition is typically prescribed by the electoral authority (e.g. a board of election) and the wording may state, for instance, "We, the qualified voters of the district in which the above candidate seeks nomination or election and of __________ signed hereunder or on the reverse side of this page, do hereby petition the above named individual to become a candidate for the office stated above in the General Election to be held on the _____ day of _____, 20__, and we do further petition that his/her name be printed upon the official ballots to be used at the election."
