= Thirty-first Amendment of the Constitution of Ireland =

2012 amendment on children's rights

- 10 November 2012
- Relating to children's rights

Results
Choice	Votes	%
Yes	615,731	58.00%
No	445,863	42.00%
Valid votes	1,061,594	99.56%
Invalid or blank votes	4,645	0.44%
Total votes	1,066,239	100.00%
Registered voters/turnout	3,183,686	33.49%

The Thirty-first Amendment of the Constitution (Children) Act 2012 (Note: Although the act was not signed into law until 2015, its short title has 2012, as specified by section 2(2) of the act itself.) (previously bill no. 78 of 2012) amended the Constitution of Ireland by inserting clauses relating to children's rights and the right and duty of the state to take child protection measures. It was passed by both Houses of the Oireachtas (parliament) on 10 October 2012, and approved at a referendum on 10 November 2012, by 58% of voters on a turnout of 33.5%. Its enactment was delayed by a High Court case challenging the conduct of the referendum. The High Court's rejection of the challenge was confirmed by the Supreme Court on 24 April 2015. It was signed into law by the President on 28 April 2015.

== Background ==
According to Aoife Nolan, "The limited consideration of children (and of children as right‐holders, specifically) in the 1937 Constitution is undoubtedly largely attributable to the contemporary societal perception of children as objects of parental rights and duties rather than autonomous right‐holders." The Constitution's framing of family and education rights in Articles 40 to 44 reflected Catholic social teaching as in Quadragesimo anno. Over the 1990s and 2000s, a political consensus developed in Ireland that children's rights needed to be strengthened in the Constitution to counterbalance family rights. Numerous contemporary and historical cases of child abuse and neglect came to light, including many involving the Catholic Church. Reports, including that of the Commission to Inquire into Child Abuse and another by Catherine McGuinness, found that state agencies' hesitancy to act was partly from fear that hasty intervention might violate the parental rights guaranteed by the Constitution. There were other controversial constitutional judgments in court cases involving minors: "Baby Ann" was placed for adoption by unmarried parents aged one week and returned to them after two years when they married, despite having bonded with foster parents in the interim; and a man found guilty underage sex, after his defence of mistaken age had been ruled inadmissible under strict liability, had his conviction overturned when the strict-liability provision was ruled unconstitutional.

The 1996 Constitution Review Group recommended:

- an express guarantee of certain rights of the child, which fall to be interpreted by the courts from the concept of 'family life', which might include

a) the right of every child to be registered immediately after birth and to have from birth a name
b) the right of every child, as far as practicable, to know his or her parents, subject to the proviso that such right should be subject to regulation by law in the interests of the child
c) the right of every child, as far as practicable, to be cared for by his or her parents
d) the right to be reared with due regard to his or her welfare

- an express requirement that in all actions concerning children, whether by legislative, judicial or administrative authorities, the best interests of the child shall be the paramount consideration.

The All-Party Oireachtas Committee's 2006 report on the family proposed inserting a section into Article 41:

All children, irrespective of birth, gender, race or religion, are equal before the law. In all cases where the welfare of the child so requires, regard shall be had to the best interests of that child.

A children's rights bill, the Twenty-Eighth Amendment of the Constitution Bill 2007, was introduced by the Fianna Fáil–PD government. The bill sought to replace section 5 of Article 42 with a new Article 42A, which had five sections; the first four broadly matched the amendment eventually enacted in 2015, while the fifth was:

1° Provision may be made by law for the collection and exchange of information relating to the endangerment, sexual exploitation or sexual abuse, or risk thereof, of children, or other persons of such a class or classes as may be prescribed by law.
2° No provision in this Constitution invalidates any law providing for offences of absolute or strict liability committed against or in connection with a child under 18 years of age.
3° The provisions of this section of this Article do not, in any way, limit the powers of the Oireachtas to provide by law for other offences of absolute or strict liability.

The 2007 bill lapsed when the 29th Dáil was dissolved for the 2007 general election. All main parties' election manifestos promised a children's referendum. After the election, the 30th Dáil and 22nd Seanad passed parallel resolutions establishing a joint committee to consider the 2007 bill as the basis for a new amendment proposal. The committee requested public comment, held hearings, and issued reports. Its final report in February 2010 proposed a complete rewrite of Article 42 of the Constitution. The Fianna Fáil–Green Party government finalised the wording for an amendment bill in January 2011, just before the Green Party left government precipitating the 2011 general election. The bill which eventually passed was introduced by the new Fine Gael–Labour government in September 2012, substantially differing from the 2010 recommendation.

== Changes to the text ==
Section 5 of Article 42 was deleted. A new Article 42A was inserted after Article 42. The changes to the text are as follows (the differences between the old 42.5 and the new 42A.2.1° are highlighted):

Text deleted

Subsection 5 from Article 42:

In exceptional cases, where the parents for physical or moral reasons fail in their duty towards their children, the State as guardian of the common good, by appropriate means shall endeavour to supply the place of the parents, but always with due regard for the natural and imprescriptible rights of the child.

Text inserted

Article 42A
1		The State recognises and affirms the natural and imprescriptible rights of all children and shall, as far as practicable, by its laws protect and vindicate those rights.
2	1°	In exceptional cases, where the parents, regardless of their marital status, fail in their duty towards their children to such an extent that the safety or welfare of any of their children is likely to be prejudicially affected, the State as guardian of the common good shall, by proportionate means as provided by law, endeavour to supply the place of the parents, but always with due regard for the natural and imprescriptible rights of the child.
2	2°	Provision shall be made by law for the adoption of any child where the parents have failed for such a period of time as may be prescribed by law in their duty towards the child and where the best interests of the child so require.
3		Provision shall be made by law for the voluntary placement for adoption and the adoption of any child.
4	1°	Provision shall be made by law that in the resolution of all proceedings—
4	1°	i	brought by the State, as guardian of the common good, for the purpose of preventing the safety and welfare of any child from being prejudicially affected, or
4	1°	ii	concerning the adoption, guardianship or custody of, or access to, any child,
4		the best interests of the child shall be the paramount consideration.
4	2°	Provision shall be made by law for securing, as far as practicable, that in all proceedings referred to in subsection 1° of this section in respect of any child who is capable of forming his or her own views, the views of the child shall be ascertained and given due weight having regard to the age and maturity of the child.

== Supreme Court ruling ==
Two days before the referendum was held, in McCrystal v. Minister for Children the Supreme Court ruled that the government had breached the constitution by using public funds to publish and distribute information concerning the referendum that was biased in favour of a yes vote. In 1995 in the case of McKenna v. An Taoiseach, the Supreme Court had ruled that public funds should be used for explaining referendums in an impartial manner. While a statutory Referendum Commission fulfilled the latter role, the Minister for Children and Youth Affairs had published a separate booklet and webpages which were found to be non-neutral.

== Result ==
Thirty-first Amendment of the Constitution Bill 2012
Choice	Votes	%
For	615,731	58.00
Against	445,863	42.00
Total	1,061,594	100.00
Valid votes	1,061,594	99.56
Invalid/blank votes	4,645	0.44
Total votes	1,066,239	100.00
Registered voters/turnout	3,183,686	33.49

Results by constituency
Constituency	Electorate	Turnout (%)	Votes		Proportion of votes	
Constituency	Electorate	Turnout (%)	Yes	No	Yes	No
Carlow–Kilkenny	103,243	34.0%	20,687	14,270	59.2%	40.8%
Cavan–Monaghan	103,024	27.5%	15,193	13,016	53.9%	46.1%
Clare	79,905	32.3%	15,868	9,846	61.8%	38.2%
Cork East	81,483	33.7%	15,351	12,006	56.2%	43.8%
Cork North-Central	74,599	33.4%	12,428	12,381	50.1%	49.9%
Cork North-West	61,513	35.1%	12,354	9,152	57.5%	42.5%
Cork South-Central	90,457	36.2%	19,424	13,211	59.6%	40.4%
Cork South-West	59,659	35.1%	11,778	9,038	56.6%	43.4%
Donegal North-East	58,503	24.5%	5,749	8,504	40.4%	59.6%
Donegal South-West	63,229	23.8%	6,523	8,463	43.6%	56.4%
Dublin Central	57,008	32.4%	10,800	7,615	58.7%	41.3%
Dublin Mid-West	64,657	35.3%	12,550	10,183	55.3%	44.7%
Dublin North	69,880	35.6%	16,066	8,717	64.9%	35.1%
Dublin North-Central	54,042	42.0%	14,328	8,304	63.4%	36.6%
Dublin North-East	58,355	38.9%	13,569	9,009	60.1%	39.9%
Dublin North-West	48,352	36.1%	8,607	8,744	49.7%	50.3%
Dublin South	102,508	40.9%	30,528	11,276	73.1%	26.9%
Dublin South-Central	79,599	34.6%	15,057	12,375	54.9%	45.1%
Dublin South-East	57,346	33.4%	13,717	5,368	71.9%	28.1%
Dublin South-West	70,003	35.9%	12,997	12,029	52.0%	48.0%
Dublin West	62,066	35.5%	13,338	8,586	60.9%	39.1%
Dún Laoghaire	79,660	41.5%	23,593	9,370	71.6%	28.4%
Galway East	83,945	29.6%	14,606	10,143	59.1%	40.9%
Galway West	95,035	28.0%	16,456	9,999	62.3%	37.7%
Kerry North–West Limerick	62,684	29.2%	9,778	8,449	53.7%	46.3%
Kerry South	57,294	29.5%	9,570	7,202	57.1%	42.9%
Kildare North	76,974	35.0%	17,807	9,062	66.3%	33.7%
Kildare South	58,319	33.4%	11,213	8,190	57.8%	42.2%
Laois–Offaly	108,495	32.0%	18,563	16,029	53.7%	46.3%
Limerick	66,230	30.3%	11,784	8,185	59.1%	40.9%
Limerick City	66,204	31.6%	12,701	8,124	61.0%	39.0%
Longford–Westmeath	85,600	30.6%	14,288	11,748	54.9%	45.1%
Louth	101,794	32.5%	17,453	15,423	53.1%	46.9%
Mayo	95,890	32.1%	16,252	14,407	53.1%	46.9%
Meath East	16,252	32.5%	12,563	8,445	59.9%	40.1%
Meath West	63,274	31.4%	10,532	9,244	53.3%	46.7%
Roscommon–South Leitrim	61,117	33.8%	10,889	9,688	53.0%	47.0%
Sligo–North Leitrim	61,270	31.4%	10,754	8,364	56.3%	43.7%
Tipperary North	62,106	37.2%	12,818	10,173	55.8%	44.2%
Tipperary South	55,773	35.2%	10,581	8,951	54.2%	45.8%
Waterford	75,470	35.1%	14,722	11,593	56.0%	44.0%
Wexford	107,268	33.1%	19,382	15,966	54.9%	45.1%
Wicklow	94,956	39.7%	22,514	15,015	60.0%	40.0%
Total	3,183,686	33.5%	615,731	445,863	58.0%	42.0%

== Court challenge ==
On 19 November 2012, two women, Joanna Jordan and Nancy Kennelly, brought petitions to the High Court challenging the referendum result, claiming that the unlawful use of public funds by the government had materially affected the outcome. Kennelly, who claimed she had voted Yes based on misleading advice in the government campaign, withdrew her petition the following week. The case of Jordan, who was active in the No campaign, was adjourned pending the handing down of written judgements in the McCrystal case, which occurred on 11 December 2012. Jordan's case was heard in April and May 2013, with expert witnesses differing on the interpretation of a Behaviour & Attitudes survey of voters carried out for the Referendum Commission after polling day. Judgment was reserved on 16 May 2013.

On 18 October 2013, judge Paul McDermott rejected the petition, ruling that Jordan had failed to prove the government's advocacy had "materially affected" the referendum result. McDermott ordered a two-week stay on the delivery of the final referendum certificate, to give Jordan an opportunity to appeal his decision to the Supreme Court. An appeal was duly lodged on 24 October. Jordan's original challenge to the referendum was made and processed by the procedure prescribed in the Referendum Act 1994; after the High Court case, she launched a separate challenge to the constitutionality of those provisions, arguing they placed too high a burden of proof on the petitioner. This challenge was also rejected by McDermott in the High Court, on 19 June 2014. Jordan was allowed to appeal against both High Court decisions at the same time; her case was heard by the Supreme Court at the start of December 2014. On 24 April 2015, the Supreme Court upheld both High Court decisions.

In June 2018, Joanna Jordan was one of three petitioners challenging the validity of the Referendum to legalise abortion.

== Subsequent legislation and interpretation ==
Prior to the 2012 referendum, the government published the general scheme of an amendment to the Adoption Act which it promised to enact after the constitutional amendment. After the 2016 general election, the new Fine Gael–led government introduced the bill in May 2016.

In September 2015, Alan Shatter introduced a private member's bill to amend the Referendum Act 1994 such that any referendum petition would be heard immediately in the Supreme Court. This was intended to prevent recurrence of such a long delay between a referendum and the enactment of the concomitant constitutional amendment.

In 2016, Justice Richard Humphreys ruled in the High Court that rights of the unborn were not limited to the right to life specified in the Eighth Amendment, but rather included others such as those specified in the 31st Amendment. This contradicted a 2009 ruling by Justice John Cooke. An appeal to the 2016 decision was upheld by the Supreme Court of Ireland in 2018.
