= Twenty-first Amendment of the Constitution of Ireland =

Amendment abolishing capital punishment

- 7 June 2001
- To ban the death penalty

Results
Choice	Votes	%
Yes	610,455	62.08%
No	372,950	37.92%
Valid votes	983,405	98.55%
Invalid or blank votes	14,480	1.45%
Total votes	997,885	100.00%
Registered voters/turnout	2,867,960	34.79%

The Twenty-first Amendment of the Constitution Act 2001 (previously bill no. 16 of 2001) is an amendment of the Constitution of Ireland which introduced a constitutional ban on the death penalty and removed all references to capital punishment from the text. It was approved by referendum on 7 June 2001 and signed into law on 27 March 2002. The referendum was held on the same day as referendums on the ratification of the Rome Statute of the International Criminal Court, which was also approved, and on the ratification of the Nice Treaty, which was rejected.

== Background ==
Capital punishment in Ireland had been abolished by the Criminal Justice Act 1990. The purpose of the amendment was therefore not to end the practice, but rather to forbid the Oireachtas from reintroducing the death penalty in future, even during a state of emergency. This is the only explicit exception to the sweeping powers otherwise granted to the state during such an emergency.

The last execution in Ireland occurred in 1954 when the murderer Michael Manning was hanged, the sentence being carried out by Albert Pierrepoint who travelled from Great Britain where he was an official hangman. The penalty has been abolished in law since 1990. It is furthermore a condition of the membership of any country of the European Union that it abolish capital punishment. Ireland is also party to a number of international agreements forbidding the death penalty. These include Protocol No. 13 to the European Convention on Human Rights which forbids capital punishment even during time of war.

== Changes to the text ==
Article 15.5 to be renumbered as 15.5.1° and the insertion of a new subsection to Article 15.5:

2° The Oireachtas shall not enact any law providing for the imposition of the death penalty.

Addition of the highlighted text to the first sentence of Article 28.3.3°:

Nothing in this Constitution other than Article 15.5.2° shall be invoked to invalidate any law enacted by the Oireachtas which is expressed to be for the purpose of securing the public safety and the preservation of the State in time of war or armed rebellion, or to nullify any act done or purporting to be done in time of war or armed rebellion in pursuance of any such law.

Deletion of the highlighted text from Article 13.6:

The right of pardon and the power to commute or remit punishment imposed by any court exercising criminal jurisdiction are hereby vested in the President, but such power of commutation or remission may~~, except in capital cases,~~ also be conferred by law on other authorities.

Deletion of the following subsection from Article 40.4:

5° Where an order is made under this section by the High Court or a judge thereof for the production of the body of a person who is under sentence of death, the High Court or such judge thereof shall further order that the execution of the said sentence of death shall be deferred until after the body of such person has been produced before the High Court and the lawfulness of his detention has been determined and if, after such deferment, the detention of such person is determined to be lawful, the High Court shall appoint a day for the execution of the said sentence of death and that sentence shall have effect with the substitution of the day so appointed for the day originally fixed for the execution thereof.

Subsections 6° and 7° of Article 40.4 renumbered as subsections 5° and 6° respectively.

== Oireachtas debate ==
The Twenty-first Amendment was proposed in Dáil Éireann by Minister for Justice, Equality and Law Reform John O'Donoghue on 11 April 2001 on behalf of the Fianna Fáil–Progressive Democrats coalition government led by Taoiseach Bertie Ahern. One member spoke against, Fine Gael TD Brendan McGahon; otherwise, it had the support of all members of the Dáil. It passed final stages without amendment on the same day. It passed all stages in Seanad Éireann on 1 May, and proceeded to a referendum on 7 June 2001.

== Campaign ==
A Referendum Commission was established by Minister for the Environment and Local Government Noel Dempsey. It was chaired by former Chief Justice Thomas Finlay. At the time, its role included setting out the arguments for and against the proposal.

== Result ==
The Twenty-first Amendment was approved on a low turnout (34%), by 62% in favour to 38% against. There were media reports after the referendum on the Twenty-first Amendment that opponents of the death penalty had mistakenly cast a "no" vote, in the belief that they were being asked to vote on capital punishment per se rather than on an amendment that would prohibit it.

Twenty-first Amendment of the Constitution of Ireland referendum
Choice	Votes	%
For	610,455	62.08
Against	372,950	37.92
Total	983,405	100.00
Valid votes	983,405	98.55
Invalid/blank votes	14,480	1.45
Total votes	997,885	100.00
Registered voters/turnout	2,867,960	34.79

Results by constituency
Constituency	Electorate	Turnout (%)	Votes		Proportion of votes	
Constituency	Electorate	Turnout (%)	Yes	No	Yes	No
Carlow–Kilkenny	92,470	34.1%	18,264	12,777	58.9%	41.1%
Cavan–Monaghan	85,803	34.7%	18,378	10,783	63.1%	36.9%
Clare	76,227	30.8%	14,458	8,678	62.5%	37.5%
Cork East	68,707	35.6%	14,414	9,690	59.8%	40.2%
Cork North-Central	75,038	33.4%	14,721	10,020	59.6%	40.4%
Cork North-West	49,749	37.5%	10,874	7,364	59.7%	40.3%
Cork South-Central	90,790	37.2%	21,197	12,166	63.6%	36.4%
Cork South-West	50,677	37.1%	11,504	6,894	62.6%	37.4%
Donegal North-East	55,035	27.6%	9,405	5,554	62.9%	37.1%
Donegal South-West	52,671	28.6%	8,786	6,029	59.4%	40.6%
Dublin Central	61,290	33.7%	12,435	7,896	61.2%	38.8%
Dublin North	70,321	37.8%	17,110	9,245	65.0%	35.0%
Dublin North-Central	64,007	43.2%	17,207	10,187	62.9%	37.1%
Dublin North-East	59,877	39.9%	14,939	8,764	63.1%	36.9%
Dublin North-West	57,284	38.3%	13,570	8,139	62.6%	37.4%
Dublin South	93,038	42.5%	27,536	11,714	70.2%	29.8%
Dublin South-Central	65,542	39.1%	16,090	9,187	63.7%	36.3%
Dublin South-East	58,820	39.6%	16,562	6,394	72.2%	27.8%
Dublin South-West	81,266	31.9%	14,761	10,884	57.6%	42.4%
Dublin West	77,760	34.4%	16,723	9,868	62.9%	37.1%
Dún Laoghaire	86,549	42.8%	26,424	10,356	71.9%	28.1%
Galway East	65,633	29.6%	11,723	7,316	61.6%	38.4%
Galway West	83,176	29.5%	15,920	8,235	66.0%	34.0%
Kerry North	53,366	32.8%	9,845	7,360	57.3%	42.7%
Kerry South	48,992	32.1%	9,537	5,886	61.9%	38.1%
Kildare North	59,035	34.4%	13,026	7,087	64.8%	35.2%
Kildare South	51,142	32.3%	9,560	6,731	58.7%	41.3%
Laois–Offaly	90,987	32.2%	16,706	11,977	58.3%	41.7%
Limerick East	80,339	34.5%	15,935	11,400	58.3%	41.7%
Limerick West	49,160	34.8%	9,882	6,845	59.1%	40.9%
Longford–Roscommon	67,305	32.0%	12,766	8,375	60.4%	39.6%
Louth	78,007	34.0%	15,616	10,547	59.7%	40.3%
Mayo	90,336	30.1%	15,912	10,737	59.8%	40.2%
Meath	101,888	32.6%	20,221	12,582	61.7%	38.3%
Sligo–Leitrim	66,748	35.2%	13,894	9,086	60.5%	39.5%
Tipperary North	56,278	34.0%	11,590	7,143	61.9%	38.1%
Tipperary South	53,463	37.0%	11,373	7,989	58.8%	41.2%
Waterford	71,946	35.0%	14,984	9,775	60.6%	39.4%
Westmeath	51,664	31.6%	9,384	6,658	58.5%	41.5%
Wexford	90,507	33.4%	17,450	12,240	58.8%	41.2%
Wicklow	85,067	38.3%	19,773	12,392	61.5%	38.5%
Total	2,867,960	34.8%	610,455	372,950	62.1%	37.9%

== See also ==
- Politics of the Republic of Ireland
- History of the Republic of Ireland
