= Twenty-third Amendment of the Constitution of Ireland =

Amendment on the International Criminal Court

- 7 June 2001
- To permit the state to become a party to the International Criminal Court

Results
Choice	Votes	%
Yes	629,234	64.22%
No	350,512	35.78%
Valid votes	979,746	98.21%
Invalid or blank votes	17,819	1.79%
Total votes	997,565	100.00%
Registered voters/turnout	2,867,960	34.78%

The Twenty-third Amendment of the Constitution Act 2001 of the Constitution of Ireland is an amendment that permitted the state to become a party to the International Criminal Court (ICC). It was approved by referendum on 7 June 2001 and signed into law on the 27 March 2002. The referendum was held on the same day as referendums on the prohibition of the death penalty, which was also approved, and on the ratification of the Nice Treaty, which was rejected.

== Background ==
The Statute of the International Criminal Court established the International Criminal Court. As its ratification would affect Ireland's sovereignty and powers and functions elsewhere in the Constitution, under the decision of the Supreme Court in Crotty v. An Taoiseach (1987), an amendment was required before it could be ratified.

== Changes to the text ==
Insertion of new Article 29.9:

The State may ratify the Rome Statute of the International Criminal Court done at Rome on the 17th day of July, 1998.

== Oireachtas debate ==
The Twenty-third Amendment was proposed in Dáil Éireann by Minister for Foreign Affairs Brian Cowen on behalf of the Fianna Fáil–Progressive Democrats coalition government led by Taoiseach Bertie Ahern. It had the support of all parties and it passed final stages in the Dáil on 12 April. It passed final stages in the Seanad on 2 May and proceeded to a referendum on 11 June 2001.

== Result ==
Twenty-third Amendment of the Constitution of Ireland referendum
Choice	Votes	%
For	629,234	64.22
Against	350,512	35.78
Total	979,746	100.00
Valid votes	979,746	98.21
Invalid/blank votes	17,819	1.79
Total votes	997,565	100.00
Registered voters/turnout	2,867,960	34.78

Results by constituency
Constituency	Electorate	Turnout (%)	Votes		Proportion of votes	
Constituency	Electorate	Turnout (%)	Yes	No	Yes	No
Carlow–Kilkenny	92,470	34.1%	19,747	11,094	64.1%	35.9%
Cavan–Monaghan	85,803	34.6%	18,803	10,184	64.9%	35.1%
Clare	76,227	30.8%	15,251	7,767	66.3%	33.7%
Cork East	68,707	35.6%	14,420	9,555	60.2%	39.8%
Cork North-Central	75,038	33.4%	14,817	9,817	60.2%	39.8%
Cork North-West	49,749	37.4%	10,890	7,206	60.2%	39.8%
Cork South-Central	90,790	37.2%	22,112	11,144	66.5%	33.5%
Cork South-West	50,677	37.0%	11,869	6,422	64.9%	35.1%
Donegal North-East	55,035	27.6%	8,446	6,428	56.8%	43.2%
Donegal South-West	52,671	28.6%	8,175	6,572	55.5%	44.5%
Dublin Central	61,290	33.7%	11,377	8,926	56.1%	43.9%
Dublin North	70,321	37.8%	18,262	8,039	69.5%	30.5%
Dublin North-Central	64,007	43.1%	17,490	9,897	63.9%	36.1%
Dublin North-East	59,877	39.8%	15,419	8,181	65.4%	34.6%
Dublin North-West	57,284	38.3%	13,552	8,106	62.6%	37.4%
Dublin South	93,038	42.5%	28,195	10,929	72.1%	27.9%
Dublin South-Central	65,542	39.1%	15,551	9,638	61.8%	38.2%
Dublin South-East	58,820	39.6%	15,777	7,066	69.1%	30.9%
Dublin South-West	81,266	31.9%	15,613	9,996	61.0%	39.0%
Dublin West	77,760	34.4%	17,956	8,601	67.7%	32.3%
Dún Laoghaire	86,549	42.8%	26,443	10,164	72.3%	27.7%
Galway East	65,633	29.6%	12,023	6,951	63.4%	36.6%
Galway West	83,176	29.5%	15,536	8,503	64.7%	35.3%
Kerry North	53,366	32.8%	9,902	7,178	58.0%	42.0%
Kerry South	48,992	32.0%	9,585	5,690	62.8%	37.2%
Kildare North	59,035	34.4%	14,099	5,985	70.3%	29.7%
Kildare South	51,142	32.3%	10,690	5,556	65.9%	34.1%
Laois–Offaly	90,987	32.2%	18,221	10,378	63.8%	36.2%
Limerick East	80,339	34.5%	17,281	10,014	63.4%	36.6%
Limerick West	49,160	34.8%	10,426	6,178	62.8%	37.2%
Longford–Roscommon	67,305	32.0%	12,954	8,083	61.6%	38.4%
Louth	78,007	34.0%	16,428	9,667	63.0%	37.0%
Mayo	90,336	30.1%	15,840	10,694	59.7%	40.3%
Meath	101,888	32.6%	21,817	10,880	66.8%	33.2%
Sligo–Leitrim	66,748	35.2%	14,000	8,930	61.1%	38.9%
Tipperary North	56,278	34.0%	12,062	6,585	64.7%	35.3%
Tipperary South	53,463	37.1%	12,098	7,205	62.7%	37.3%
Waterford	71,946	35.0%	15,845	8,797	64.4%	35.6%
Westmeath	51,664	31.6%	9,538	6,474	59.6%	40.4%
Wexford	90,507	33.4%	19,156	10,467	64.7%	35.3%
Wicklow	85,067	38.3%	21,029	11,016	65.7%	34.3%
Total	2,867,960	34.8%	628,695	350,963	64.2%	35.8%

== Aftermath ==
The International Criminal Court came into force on 1 July 2002.

== Note on numbering ==
The Twenty-third Amendment Bill was put to the people with the Twenty-first and Twenty-fourth Amendment Bills. This is because the Twenty-second Amendment of the Constitution Bill was withdrawn by the government during the course of debate in the Oireachtas. There was therefore no Twenty-second Amendment of the Constitution of Ireland, as the title of legislation is not changed on its enactment.

== See also ==
- Politics of the Republic of Ireland
- History of the Republic of Ireland
