= Twenty-sixth Amendment of the Constitution of Ireland =

Amendment on the Treaty of Nice

- 19 October 2002
- To permit the state to ratify the Treaty of Nice

Results
Choice	Votes	%
Yes	906,317	62.89%
No	534,887	37.11%
Valid votes	1,441,204	99.63%
Invalid or blank votes	5,384	0.37%
Total votes	1,446,588	100.00%
Registered voters/turnout	2,923,918	49.47%

The Twenty-sixth Amendment of the Constitution Act 2002 (previously bill no. 32 of 2003) is an amendment of the Constitution of Ireland which permitted the state to ratify the Treaty of Nice. It was approved by referendum on 19 October 2002 (sometimes known as the second Nice referendum) and signed into law on 7 November of the same year. The amendment followed a previous failed attempt to approve the Nice Treaty which was rejected in the first Nice referendum held in 2001.

== Background ==
The Treaty of Nice was signed by the member states of the European Union in February 2001, amending the Treaties of the European Union. Under the decision of the Supreme Court in Crotty v. An Taoiseach (1987), an amendment to the Constitution was required before it could be ratified by Ireland. In June 2001, an amendment to the Constitution to allow the ratification of the Nice Treaty was rejected in a referendum. One of the reasons the 'No' side had called for its rejection was that it would affect Irish neutrality. When the Nice Treaty was put to a second vote, the wording of the constitutional amendment excluded participation in common defence. The Treaty of Nice contained a number of optional discretionary provisions that member-states could activate at a later time after its adoption. The Government of Ireland and the European Council jointly made the Seville Declarations on the Treaty of Nice in June 2002 to recommit themselves to shared interests ahead of the second vote. The Twenty-sixth Amendment permitted the Republic to choose to exercise these options, provided its decision was approved by the Oireachtas.

== Changes to the text ==
Insertion of the following subsections in Article 29.4:

7° The State may ratify the Treaty of Nice amending the Treaty on European Union, the Treaties establishing the European Communities and certain related Acts signed at Nice on the 26th day of February 2001.

8° The State may exercise the options or discretions provided by or under Articles 1.6, 1.9, 1.11, 1.12, 1.13 and 2.1 of the Treaty referred to in subsection 7° of this section but any such exercise shall be subject to the prior approval of both Houses of the Oireachtas.

9° The State shall not adopt a decision taken by the European Council to establish a common defence pursuant to Article 1.2 of the Treaty referred to in subsection 7 of this section where that common defence would include the State.

Existing subsections 7° and 8° of Article 29.4 renumbered as 10° and 11° respectively.

== Oireachtas debate ==
The Twenty-sixth Amendment of the Constitution Bill was proposed in Dáil Éireann by Minister for Foreign Affairs Brian Cowen on 4 September 2002 on behalf of the Fianna Fáil–Progressive Democrats coalition government led by Taoiseach Bertie Ahern. It passed final stages in the Dáil on 11 September, where it also had the support of Fine Gael and the Labour Party, and was opposed by Sinn Féin, the Green Party and the Socialist Party and a number of Independent TDs. It passed final stages in Seanad Éireann on 13 September and proceeded to a referendum on 19 October.

== Campaign ==
A Referendum Commission was established by Minister for the Environment and Local Government Noel Dempsey. It was chaired by former Chief Justice Thomas Finlay. Its role was to prepare one or more statements containing a general explanation of the subject matter of the proposal and of the text of the proposal in the amendment bill.

== Result ==
Twenty-sixth Amendment of the Constitution of Ireland referendum
Choice	Votes	%
For	906,317	62.89
Against	534,887	37.11
Total	1,441,204	100.00
Valid votes	1,441,204	99.63
Invalid/blank votes	5,384	0.37
Total votes	1,446,588	100.00
Registered voters/turnout	2,923,918	49.47

Result by constituency
Constituency	Electorate	Turnout (%)	Votes		Proportion of votes		± Yes 2001
Constituency	Electorate	Turnout (%)	Yes	No	Yes	No	± Yes 2001
Carlow–Kilkenny	94,668	49.9%	31,402	15,546	66.9%	33.1%	+19.1%
Cavan–Monaghan	86,865	50.5%	27,262	16,370	62.5%	37.5%	+14.4%
Clare	77,519	47.1%	24,839	11,484	68.4%	31.6%	+19.6%
Cork East	71,175	50.0%	21,960	13,504	62.0%	38.0%	+18.4%
Cork North-Central	76,671	47.0%	19,751	16,146	55.1%	44.9%	+14.2%
Cork North-West	52,513	55.3%	18,552	10,360	64.2%	35.8%	+19.0%
Cork South-Central	88,246	52.0%	28,506	17,282	62.3%	37.7%	+16.0%
Cork South-West	51,531	52.6%	16,694	10,243	62.0%	38.0%	+14.6%
Donegal North-East	56,794	39.3%	11,647	10,555	52.5%	47.5%	+12.6%
Donegal South-West	53,443	41.8%	12,227	10,022	55.0%	45.0%	+15.3%
Dublin Central	60,152	48.0%	16,460	12,305	57.3%	42.7%	+17.3%
Dublin Mid-West	54,337	44.9%	14,716	9,657	60.4%	39.6%	
Dublin North	70,799	52.8%	24,839	12,532	66.5%	33.5%	+18.5%
Dublin North-Central	64,599	56.6%	22,763	13,676	62.5%	37.5%	+19.5%
Dublin North-East	51,198	51.6%	15,953	10,414	60.6%	39.4%	+17.0%
Dublin North-West	47,043	47.2%	11,961	10,176	54.1%	45.9%	+12.2%
Dublin South	90,876	56.4%	37,096	14,133	72.5%	27.5%	+20.6%
Dublin South-Central	84,372	47.0%	21,454	18,048	54.4%	45.6%	+10.2%
Dublin South-East	56,839	51.5%	19,720	9,407	67.8%	32.2%	+18.5%
Dublin South-West	67,215	46.6%	17,820	13,516	56.9%	43.1%	+18.4%
Dublin West	51,651	49.7%	15,935	9,724	62.2%	37.8%	+18.1%
Dún Laoghaire	88,490	56.6%	36,695	13,375	73.3%	26.7%	+19.7%
Galway East	72,283	47.5%	22,202	11,986	65.0%	35.0%	+17.6%
Galway West	79,460	45.2%	21,649	14,146	60.5%	39.5%	+18.5%
Kerry North	54,137	46.3%	13,887	11,097	55.6%	44.4%	+16.1%
Kerry South	49,527	50.1%	14,958	9,766	60.5%	39.5%	+15.5%
Kildare North	57,540	50.5%	19,868	9,080	68.7%	31.3%	+19.3%
Kildare South	56,147	46.4%	17,123	8,808	66.1%	33.9%	+18.3%
Laois–Offaly	93,648	49.2%	30,120	15,742	65.7%	34.3%	+17.0%
Limerick East	79,005	49.3%	23,876	14,921	61.6%	38.4%	+15.0%
Limerick West	52,636	50.2%	16,581	9,701	63.1%	36.9%	+13.7%
Longford–Roscommon	68,485	50.9%	21549	13,153	62.1%	37.9%	+14.7%
Louth	80,663	47.7%	22,739	15,513	59.5%	40.5%	+12.8%
Mayo	91,805	46.1%	24,647	17,510	58.5%	41.5%	+14.2%
Meath	107,309	46.7%	32,712	17,374	65.4%	34.6%	+17.3%
Sligo–Leitrim	67,759	49.3%	20,981	12,214	63.3%	36.7%	+18.4%
Tipperary North	57,211	51.3%	19,705	9,484	67.6%	32.4%	+18.1%
Tipperary South	54,272	51.5%	18,167	9,602	65.5%	34.5%	+16.9%
Waterford	72,772	50.5%	23,291	13,297	63.7%	36.3%	+15.4%
Westmeath	52,897	48.4%	16,235	9,249	63.8%	36.2%	+18.7%
Wexford	92,603	48.8%	28,065	16,937	62.4%	37.6%	+13.6%
Wicklow	86,763	53.9%	29,710	16,832	63.9%	36.1%	+17.6%
Total	2,923,918	49.5%	906,317	534,887	62.9%	37.1%	+16.8%

The '± Yes 2001' column shows the percentage point change in the Yes vote compared to the first Nice referendum which was rejected in a referendum in 2001.

== Note on numbering ==
The Twenty-sixth Amendment follows directly after the Twenty-third Amendment in the list of passed Amendments. This is because the Twenty-fourth and Twenty-fifth Amendment of the Constitution Bills were both rejected in referendums, and the government decided not to reuse the numbers. Numbers have been re-used before, for example, there were rejected proposals titled the Third Amendment in 1959 and in 1968, before the Third Amendment of the Constitution of Ireland was passed in 1972.

== See also ==
- Politics of the Republic of Ireland
- History of the Republic of Ireland
- Twenty-eighth Amendment of the Constitution of Ireland (Permission to ratify the Treaty of Lisbon).
