= Twenty-fourth Amendment of the Constitution Bill 2001 =

Proposed amendment to permit the state to ratify the Treaty of Nice

- 7 June 2001
- To permit the state to ratify the Treaty of Nice

Results
Choice	Votes	%
Yes	453,461	46.13%
No	529,478	53.87%
Valid votes	982,939	98.51%
Invalid or blank votes	14,887	1.49%
Total votes	997,826	100.00%
Registered voters/turnout	2,867,960	34.79%

The Twenty-fourth Amendment of the Constitution Bill 2001 (bill no. 19 of 2001) was a proposed amendment to the Constitution of Ireland to allow the state to ratify the Treaty of Nice of the European Union. The proposal was rejected in a referendum held in June 2001, sometimes referred to as the first Nice referendum. The referendum was held on the same day as referendums on the prohibition of the death penalty and on the ratification of the Rome Statute of the International Criminal Court, both of which were approved.

The Nice Treaty was subsequently approved by Irish voters when the Twenty-sixth Amendment was approved in the second Nice referendum, held in 2002.

== Background ==
The Treaty of Nice was signed by the member states of the European Union in February 2001, amending the Treaties of the European Union. Under the decision of the Supreme Court in Crotty v. An Taoiseach (1987), an amendment to the Constitution was required before it could be ratified by Ireland. Ireland was the only one of the 15 EU member states to put the Treaty to the people in a referendum.

== Proposed changes to the text ==
Insertion of the following subsections in Article 29.4:

7° The State may ratify the Treaty of Nice amending the Treaty on European Union, the Treaties establishing the European Communities and certain related Acts signed at Nice on the 26th day of February, 2001. 8° The State may exercise the options or discretions provided by or under Articles 1.6, 1.9, 1.11, 1.12, 1.13 and 2.1 of the Treaty referred to in subsection 7° of this section but any such exercise shall be subject to the prior approval of both Houses of the Oireachtas.

Renumbering of subsections 7° and 8° of Article 29.4 as subsections 9° and 10°.

== Oireachtas debate ==
The Twenty-fourth Amendment was proposed in Dáil Éireann by Minister for Foreign Affairs Brian Cowen on behalf of the Fianna Fáil–Progressive Democrats coalition government led by Taoiseach Bertie Ahern. It was supported by opposition parties Fine Gael and the Labour Party, while it was opposed by the Green Party, Sinn Féin and the Socialist Party, as well as Independent TD Tony Gregory. It passed final stages in the Dáil on 2 May, with insufficient opposition to force a roll call vote. It passed final stages in the Seanad on 4 May and proceeded to a referendum on 11 June 2001.

== Campaign ==
A Referendum Commission was established by Minister for the Environment and Local Government Noel Dempsey. It was chaired by former Chief Justice Thomas Finlay. At the time, its role included setting out the arguments for and against the proposal.

== Result ==
Twenty-fourth Amendment of the Constitution of Ireland Bill 2001
Choice	Votes	%
For	453,461	46.13
Against	529,478	53.87
Total	982,939	100.00
Valid votes	982,939	98.51
Invalid/blank votes	14,887	1.49
Total votes	997,826	100.00
Registered voters/turnout	2,867,960	34.79

Result by constituency
Constituency	Electorate	Turnout (%)	Votes		Proportion of votes	
Constituency	Electorate	Turnout (%)	Yes	No	Yes	No
Carlow–Kilkenny	92,470	34.1%	14,799	16,197	47.8%	52.2%
Cavan–Monaghan	85,803	34.6%	14,031	15,145	48.1%	51.9%
Clare	76,227	30.8%	11,265	11,853	48.8%	51.2%
Cork East	68,707	35.6%	10,490	13,613	43.6%	56.4%
Cork North-Central	75,038	33.4%	10,127	14,648	40.9%	59.1%
Cork North-West	49,749	37.5%	8,224	9,978	45.2%	54.8%
Cork South-Central	90,790	37.2%	15,428	17,952	46.3%	53.7%
Cork South-West	50,677	37.1%	8,725	9,704	47.4%	52.6%
Donegal North-East	55,035	27.6%	5,953	8,980	39.9%	60.1%
Donegal South-West	52,671	28.6%	5,879	8,961	39.7%	60.3%
Dublin Central	61,290	33.7%	8,115	12,197	40.0%	60.0%
Dublin North	70,321	37.8%	12,635	13,695	48.0%	52.0%
Dublin North-Central	64,007	43.2%	11,752	15,636	43.0%	57.0%
Dublin North-East	59,877	39.8%	10,291	13,338	43.6%	56.4%
Dublin North-West	57,284	38.3%	9,078	12,621	41.9%	58.1%
Dublin South	93,038	42.6%	20,369	18,894	51.9%	48.1%
Dublin South-Central	65,542	39.1%	11,199	14,141	44.2%	55.8%
Dublin South-East	58,820	39.7%	11,327	11,650	49.3%	50.7%
Dublin South-West	81,266	31.9%	9,856	15,797	38.5%	61.5%
Dublin West	77,760	34.4%	11,708	14,856	44.1%	55.9%
Dún Laoghaire	86,549	42.8%	19,654	17,030	53.6%	46.4%
Galway East	65,633	29.6%	9,009	10,034	47.4%	52.6%
Galway West	83,176	29.5%	10,100	13,951	42.0%	58.0%
Kerry North	53,366	32.8%	6,786	10,426	39.5%	60.5%
Kerry South	48,992	32.1%	6,924	8,486	45.0%	55.0%
Kildare North	59,035	34.5%	9,923	10,196	49.4%	50.6%
Kildare South	51,142	32.3%	7,771	8,513	47.8%	52.2%
Laois–Offaly	90,987	32.2%	13,950	14,736	48.7%	51.3%
Limerick East	80,339	34.5%	12,720	14,593	46.6%	53.4%
Limerick West	49,160	34.8%	8,246	8,476	49.4%	50.6%
Longford–Roscommon	67,305	32.0%	9,988	11,128	47.4%	52.6%
Louth	78,007	34.0%	12,203	13,972	46.7%	53.3%
Mayo	90,336	30.1%	11,799	14,865	44.3%	55.7%
Meath	101,888	32.6%	15,712	17,005	48.1%	51.9%
Sligo–Leitrim	66,748	35.2%	10,303	12,671	44.9%	55.1%
Tipperary North	56,278	33.9%	9,260	9,472	49.5%	50.5%
Tipperary South	53,463	37.0%	9,410	9,965	48.6%	51.4%
Waterford	71,946	35.0%	11,919	12,795	48.3%	51.7%
Westmeath	51,664	31.6%	7,233	8,814	45.1%	54.9%
Wexford	90,507	33.4%	14,461	15,220	48.8%	51.2%
Wicklow	85,067	38.3%	14,839	17,274	46.3%	53.7%
Total	2,867,960	34.8%	453,461	529,478	46.1%	53.9%

== Aftermath ==
The functions of the Referendum Commission were altered by the Referendum Act 2001, so that it would no longer set out arguments on either side of a proposal.

A second referendum was held on the Nice Treaty in October 2002, and the voters approved of the Twenty-sixth Amendment. Because of concerns that the Treaty would affect Irish neutrality, a further subsection was included on that occasion to address these fears.

== See also ==
- Constitution of Ireland
- Politics of the Republic of Ireland
- Seville Declarations on the Treaty of Nice
