= Divorce Action Group =

Irish advocacy group

- Abbreviation: DAG
- Formation: 23 January 1980; 45 years ago
- Founders: Irish Council for Civil Liberties
- Founded at: Liberty Hall, Dublin, Ireland
- Dissolved: 11 June 1999; 26 years ago
- Purpose: Activism
- Chairpersons: Kader Asmal; John O'Connor; Jean Tansey

Divorce Action Group (Irish: Grúpa Gníomhaíochta Colscartha) was an Irish organisation campaigning for the legalisation of divorce in Ireland. The group was one of the main advocators for divorce in the 1986 and 1995 divorce referendums.

== History ==
The organisation was established by the Irish Council for Civil Liberties among others to represent and support those whose marriages have broken down with the goal of bringing divorce to Ireland. South African politician Kader Asmal, a member of ICCL, held the first public meeting for DAG at Liberty Hall on 23 January 1980. Irish singer Sinead O'Connor's father John, a structural engineer and barrister, was the secretary at the group's inception and later became the public relations officer and chairman of the organisation.

In later years, branches were set up in various parts of Ireland such as Mullingar, Tullamore, Waterford, Thurles, Galway and Cork to extend the reach of the cause across the country.

The group was campaigning for the 1986 divorce referendum which ultimately resulted in a No vote. The organisation was registered as a company on 20 December 1993 and later dissolved on 11 June 1999 following the legalisation of divorce in 1995.
