= Eighteenth Amendment of the Constitution of Ireland =

Amendment on the Treaty of Amsterdam

- 22 May 1998
- To permit the state to ratify the Treaty of Amsterdam

Results
Choice	Votes	%
Yes	932,632	61.74%
No	578,070	38.26%
Valid votes	1,510,702	97.85%
Invalid or blank votes	33,228	2.15%
Total votes	1,543,930	100.00%
Registered voters/turnout	2,747,088	56.2%

The Eighteenth Amendment of the Constitution Act 1998 (previously bill no. 1 of 1998) is an amendment of the Constitution of Ireland which permitted the state to ratify the Treaty of Amsterdam. It was approved by referendum on 22 May 1998 and signed into law on the 3 June of the same year. The referendum was held on the same day as the referendum on the Nineteenth Amendment, which related to approval of the Good Friday Agreement.

== Background ==
The Amsterdam Treaty was signed on 2 October 1997 by the member states of the European Union, amending provisions of the Maastricht Treaty (which had been approved by the Eleventh Amendment in 1992) and the Rome Treaty (which had been approved by the Third Amendment in 1972). Following the Supreme Court decision of Crotty v. An Taoiseach (1987), a constitutional amendment was required before the state could ratify the Treaty. The Treaty of Amsterdam contained a number of optional protocols that member-states could activate at a later time after its adoption. The Eighteenth Amendment permitted the Republic to choose to exercise these options, provided it had the support of the Oireachtas (parliament).

== Changes to the text ==
The following subsections were inserted after Article 29.4.4°:

5° The State may ratify the Treaty of Amsterdam amending the Treaty on European Union, the Treaties establishing the European Communities and certain related Acts signed at Amsterdam on the 2nd day of October, 1997. 6° The State may exercise the options or discretions provided by or under Articles 1.11, 2.5 and 2.15 of the Treaty referred to in subsection 5° of this section and the second and fourth Protocols set out in the said Treaty but any such exercise shall be subject to the prior approval of both Houses of the Oireachtas.

The existing subsections 5° and 6° of Article 29.4 were renumbered as subsections 7° and 8° respectively.

== Oireachtas debates ==
The Eighteenth Amendment was proposed by Minister for Foreign Affairs David Andrews on behalf of the Fianna Fáil–Progressive Democrats coalition government led by Taoiseach Bertie Ahern. It was also supported by Fine Gael, the Labour Party and Democratic Left, while it was opposed by the Green Party, Sinn Féin and the Socialist Party. It passed final stages in the Dáil on 26 March 1998. It passed final stages in the Seanad on and proceeded to a referendum on 22 May 1998.

== Campaign ==
A Referendum Commission was established by Minister for the Environment and Local Government Noel Dempsey. This was the first referendum at which a Referendum Commission was established. It was chaired by former Chief Justice Thomas Finlay. At the time, its role included setting out the arguments for and against the proposal.

== Result ==
Eighteenth Amendment of the Constitution of Ireland referendum
Choice	Votes	%
For	932,632	61.74
Against	578,070	38.26
Total	1,510,702	100.00
Valid votes	1,510,702	97.85
Invalid/blank votes	33,228	2.15
Total votes	1,543,930	100.00
Registered voters/turnout	2,747,088	56.20

Results by constituency
Constituency	Electorate	Turnout (%)	Votes		Proportion of votes	
Constituency	Electorate	Turnout (%)	Yes	No	Yes	No
Carlow–Kilkenny	86,584	56.2%	30,122	17,181	63.7%	36.3%
Cavan–Monaghan	83,141	60.8%	32,044	17,115	65.2%	34.8%
Clare	71,060	51.5%	22,939	12,709	64.4%	35.6%
Cork East	63,881	55.3%	19,780	14,725	57.4%	42.6%
Cork North-Central	72,802	53.3%	20,715	17,326	54.5%	45.5%
Cork North-West	47,402	59.1%	15,682	11,472	57.8%	42.2%
Cork South-Central	85,752	58.2%	28,460	20,606	58.1%	41.9%
Cork South-West	47,988	57.5%	15,632	11,085	58.6%	41.4%
Donegal North-East	52,188	55.9%	17,843	10,718	62.5%	37.5%
Donegal South-West	51,097	54.6%	16,492	10,697	60.7%	39.3%
Dublin Central	63,483	52.8%	18,744	14,186	57.0%	43.0%
Dublin North	65,312	60.6%	24,912	14,159	63.8%	36.2%
Dublin North-Central	65,737	65.1%	24,832	17,239	59.1%	40.9%
Dublin North-East	59,398	61.5%	21,523	14,539	59.7%	40.3%
Dublin North-West	59,332	59.2%	19,905	14,705	57.6%	42.4%
Dublin South	90,536	63.4%	36,281	20,227	64.3%	35.7%
Dublin South-Central	66,994	59.4%	22,349	16,782	57.2%	42.8%
Dublin South-East	62,663	59.5%	22,298	14,376	60.9%	39.1%
Dublin South-West	76,748	52.3%	22,604	16,959	57.2%	42.8%
Dublin West	68,773	56.1%	22,495	15,571	59.1%	40.9%
Dún Laoghaire	86,311	62.2%	34,530	18,268	65.5%	34.5%
Galway East	61,703	52.8%	21,590	10,070	68.2%	31.8%
Galway West	79,180	48.9%	23,470	14,285	62.2%	37.8%
Kerry North	51,641	50.7%	14,126	11,394	55.4%	44.6%
Kerry South	47,677	53.3%	14,410	10,232	58.5%	41.5%
Kildare North	54,104	54.4%	18,479	10,485	63.8%	36.2%
Kildare South	47,904	51.3%	15,644	8,442	65.0%	35.0%
Laois–Offaly	84,530	55.1%	27,839	17,690	61.2%	38.8%
Limerick East	77,884	54.3%	26,241	15,113	63.5%	36.5%
Limerick West	48,454	52.5%	15,287	9,348	62.1%	37.9%
Longford–Roscommon	63,968	56.1%	23,255	11,600	66.8%	33.2%
Louth	72,116	60.5%	28,137	14,724	65.7%	34.3%
Mayo	86,785	52.1%	28,621	15,284	65.2%	34.8%
Meath	92,053	54.1%	31,660	17,189	64.9%	35.1%
Sligo–Leitrim	64,538	57.0%	23,487	12,290	65.7%	34.3%
Tipperary North	53,368	57.4%	18,137	11,649	60.9%	39.1%
Tipperary South	51,439	57.9%	18,240	10,764	62.9%	37.1%
Waterford	69,793	54.3%	23,002	14,005	62.2%	37.8%
Westmeath	48,289	54.7%	16,310	9,385	63.5%	36.5%
Wexford	84,228	52.6%	27,860	15,326	64.6%	35.4%
Wicklow	80,252	56.9%	26,655	18,150	59.5%	40.5%
Total	2,747,088	56.2%	932,632	578,070	61.7%	38.3%

== Aftermath ==
The European Communities (Amendment) Act 1998 amended the European Communities Act 1972 to provide a statutory basis for decisions under the Amsterdam Treaty. The Treaty took effect across the European Union on 1 May 1999.
