= Thirty-eighth Amendment of the Constitution of Ireland =

2019 amendment easing divorce restrictions

- 24 May 2019
- To delete the requirement for a period of separation before proceedings for divorce could be initiated. To recognise foreign divorces

Results
Choice	Votes	%
Yes	1,384,192	82.07%
No	302,319	17.93%
Valid votes	1,686,511	97.65%
Invalid or blank votes	40,545	2.35%
Total votes	1,727,056	100.00%
Registered voters/turnout	3,397,636	50.83%
- Results by local authority

The Thirty-eighth Amendment of the Constitution of Ireland is an amendment to the Constitution of Ireland which altered the provisions regulating divorce. It removed the constitutional requirement for a defined period of separation before a Court may grant a dissolution of marriage, and eased restrictions on the recognition of foreign divorces. The amendment was effected by an act of the Oireachtas, the Thirty-eighth Amendment of the Constitution (Dissolution of Marriage) Act 2019 (introduced as bill no. 57 of 2016).

The bill as introduced did not propose the total deletion of a waiting period from the Constitution, merely a reduction in the required term. After amendments by the Oireachtas, the bill was put to a referendum on 24 May 2019, the same date as the local and European elections. The proposal was approved by 82% of voters. The bill was signed into law on 11 June 2019 by Michael D. Higgins, the President of Ireland.

== Background ==
When the Constitution of Ireland was adopted in 1937, divorce was prohibited by Article 41.3.2°. A referendum held in 1986 to remove this prohibition was defeated. The prohibition was removed after a second referendum held in 1995, which was narrowly approved by 50.28% to 49.72%. The recognition of foreign divorce is regulated by Article 41.3.3°, which was unaffected by the 1995 referendum. The text of these two subsections prior to the 2019 amendment is set out below:

2° A Court designated by law may grant a dissolution of marriage where, but only where, it is satisfied that –

i. at the date of the institution of the proceedings, the spouses have lived apart from one another for a period of, or periods amounting to, at least four years during the previous five years,
ii. there is no reasonable prospect of a reconciliation between the spouses,
iii. such provision as the Court considers proper having regard to the circumstances exists or will be made for the spouses, any children of either or both of them and any other person prescribed by law, and
iv. any further conditions prescribed by law are complied with.

3° No person whose marriage has been dissolved under the civil law of any other State but is a subsisting valid marriage under the law for the time being in force within the jurisdiction of the Government and Parliament established by this Constitution shall be capable of contracting a valid marriage within that jurisdiction during the lifetime of the other party to the marriage so dissolved.

Divorce is regulated in statute law by the Family Law (Divorce) Act 1996, passed after the 1995 amendment, which repeats conditions i, ii and iii of Article 41.3.2° verbatim. Limited recognition of foreign divorce is provided by the Domicile and Recognition of Foreign Divorces Act 1986. In 2015, the Supreme Court called for reform of the 1986 Act.

== Legislative history ==
The bill was introduced in the 32nd Dáil as the Thirty-fifth Amendment of the Constitution (Divorce) Bill 2016, a private member's bill by a backbench TD from the Fine Gael party, Josepha Madigan. It proposed to reduce the period of separation from four years to two years by the substitution of the following text for clause 41.3.2°(i) above:

i. at the date of the institution of the proceedings, the spouses have lived separate and apart from one another for a period of, or periods amounting to, at least two years in the previous three years,

The Fine Gael-led government agreed to support the bill, thereby permitting it to go second stage in the Dáil on 6 April 2017. The committee stage was referred to the Select Committee On Justice And Equality, which considered it on 12 July 2017. The Independents 4 Change TD, Clare Daly, wanted the separation period removed from the Constitution and dealt with instead in statute law, by amending the Family Law (Divorce) Act 1996, as allowed under Article Article 41.3.2°(iv). Josepha Madigan said she was "not sure that the Irish people are completely ready for this provision to be taken out of the Constitution". The Solidarity–People Before Profit TD, Ruth Coppinger, proposed the specification of a maximum separation period that would be set by statute law, or a shorter one, or none. The Fine Gael TD, David Stanton, the Minister of State for Equality, Immigration and Integration, said the government would propose substantive amendments to the bill at report stage, which other deputies criticised as rendering the committee stage redundant. The bill passed committee stage unamended.

In November 2017 Madigan was appointed to the government as Minister for Culture, Heritage and the Gaeltacht. Nevertheless, on the Dáil order paper the bill formally remained as a private member's bill rather than a government bill; bills of the former class of proceed more slowly than those of the latter, because less Dáil time is reserved for private members' business.

=== Government amendments ===
In January 2019, the government announced that it would propose amendments to the bill at report stage to eliminate the waiting period and to regulate foreign divorce. In March 2019, the government announced the wording for these amendments. It would propose to delete paragraph (i) of Article 41.3.2° and renumber subsequent paragraphs; and to substitute the following for subsection 3°:

3° Provision may be made by law for the recognition under the law of the State of a dissolution of marriage granted under the civil law of another state.

The government also published the Draft of a General Scheme of the Family Law (Divorce) (Amendment) Bill 2019, which it said that it would enact if the referendum passed. The promised bill would amend Section 5(1) of Family Law (Divorce) Act 1996 by the substitution of “two years during the previous three years” for “four years during the previous five years”.

Minister Charles Flanagan proposed the amendments to the constitutional bill in the Dáil at report stage on 3 April 2019; they passed unopposed and the bill completed remaining Dáil stages. Flanagan also said that the issue of changing the law on foreign divorces within the terms of the revised Article 41.3.3° would be referred to the Law Reform Commission. The number of the amendment was also changed from 35 to 38, as amendment numbers 36 and 37 had been enacted since the divorce bill was introduced.

The bill passed all stages in the Seanad on 11 April 2019. The following day, Eoghan Murphy, the Minister for Housing, Local Government and Heritage set 24 May 2019 as the date for the referendum.

== Referendum ==
The bill was submitted to referendum on 24 May 2019, the same day as the European Parliament election and local elections. It was the first time that a private member's bill was scheduled for a referendum. The "statement for the information of voters" that appeared on the ballot paper was approved by identical resolutions of the Dáil and Seanad passed immediately after the bill.

The Referendum Commission for the amendment referendum was established on 26 February 2019 with High Court judge Tara Burns appointed as chair. Registration as an "approved body" entitled to campaign for or against the bill was open from 10 April to 25 April.

=== Campaign ===
The referendum was overshadowed by campaigning for the simultaneous local and European elections. The lacklustre campaign was attributed to "campaign fatigue" by a campaigner on the "No" side, Seamas de Barra, who is treasurer for the Alliance for the Defence of the Family and Marriage:

I think it's largely campaign fatigue from the abortion referendum.

One argument in favour was that couples under the current law often obtain a judicial separation after two years apart and a divorce after four years, thus incurring two sets of legal costs.

Some commentators criticised the bundling into a single amendment bill of two distinct changes (removal of the four-year waiting period and recognition of foreign divorces) thus preventing voters from approving one while rejecting the other. An opinion poll taken on 7–9 May for The Irish Times found 77% of respondents would vote Yes, 8% No, 11% unsure, and 4% would not vote. Among likely voters, 91% favoured Yes.

The amendment was supported by Fine Gael, Fianna Fáil, Sinn Féin, the Labour Party, Solidarity–People Before Profit, Social Democrats and the Green Party, as well as the Law Society of Ireland, Union of Students in Ireland, Free Legal Advice Centres, Irish Council for Civil Liberties, and National Women's Council of Ireland.

Organisations that campaigned for a "No" vote included Richard Greene's "Alliance for Defence of Family and Marriage" and Renua's European candidate in the Midlands–North-West, Michael O'Dowd. Journalist Jennifer Bray suggested that opponents felt that "the race is lost and … mounting a full-scale campaign would be pointless". David Quinn said the Iona Institute was opposed but did not campaign because "there is very little interest or awareness amongst our supporters on this issue. The stakes aren’t remotely as high as the abortion debate". Denis Nulty, Catholic Bishop of Kildare and Leighlin and chair of the Council for Marriage & Family of the Irish Catholic Bishops' Conference, called on voters to "reflect deeply" and said the amendment's objective was "liberalising divorce rather than supporting marriage".

== Result ==
The proposal was approved.

Thirty-eighth Amendment of the Constitution (Dissolution of Marriage) Bill 2016
Choice	Votes	%
For	1,384,192	82.07
Against	302,319	17.93
Total	1,686,511	100.00
Valid votes	1,686,511	97.65
Invalid/blank votes	40,545	2.35
Total votes	1,727,056	100.00
Registered voters/turnout	3,397,636	50.83

Results by local authority area
Local Authority	Electorate	Turnout (%)	Votes		Proportion of votes	
Local Authority	Electorate	Turnout (%)	Yes	No	Yes	No
Carlow	44,440	48.35%	16,668	4,220	79.80%	20.20%
Cavan	56,466	56.73%	24,108	6,811	77.97%	22.03%
Clare	88,273	56.31%	39,747	8,551	82.30%	17.70%
Cork City	142,627	47.14%	54,200	12,119	81.73%	18.27%
Cork County	260,527	50.53%	104,043	24,246	81.10%	18.90%
Donegal	127,840	55.84%	52,979	15,869	76.95%	23.05%
Dublin City	354,447	39.09%	116,783	20,064	85.34%	14.66%
Dún Laoghaire–Rathdown	157,366	49.27%	66,529	10,202	86.70%	13.30%
Fingal	176,889	44.79%	67,745	10,696	86.36%	13.64%
Galway City	49,249	46.62%	18,568	3,922	82.56%	17.44%
Galway County	140,475	54.91%	60,675	13,662	81.62%	18.38%
Kerry	111,638	60.28%	52,052	12,630	80.47%	19.53%
Kildare	145,217	47.41%	57,881	9,904	85.39%	14.61%
Kilkenny	72,603	53.35%	30,384	7,323	80.58%	19.42%
Laois	59,129	53.88%	24,759	6,215	79.93%	20.07%
Leitrim	26,340	64.94%	12,517	3,864	76.41%	23.59%
Limerick City and County	142,960	51.11%	55,862	15,122	78.70%	21.30%
Longford	30,562	63.23%	14,467	4,180	77.58%	22.42%
Louth	91,475	48.67%	36,041	7,723	82.35%	17.65%
Mayo	98,721	62.44%	46,987	12,269	79.29%	20.71%
Meath	141,247	49.09%	56,730	11,423	83.24%	16.76%
Monaghan	47,017	56.97%	19,366	6,441	75.04%	24.96%
Offaly	57,301	54.20%	24,389	5,785	80.83%	19.17%
Roscommon	48,654	61.61%	22,605	6,344	78.09%	21.91%
Sligo	54,263	60.51%	25,550	6,239	80.37%	19.63%
South Dublin	184,645	43.12%	67,852	10,991	86.06%	13.94%
Tipperary	124,856	59.09%	57,073	14,578	79.65%	20.35%
Waterford City and County	82,312	53.45%	34,970	8,033	81.32%	18.68%
Westmeath	67,590	49.72%	25,998	6,727	79.44%	20.56%
Wexford	116,660	52.34%	51,289	8,712	85.48%	14.52%
Wicklow	95,847	56.04%	45,375	7,454	85.89%	14.11%
Total	3,397,636	50.83%	1,384,192	302,391	82.07%	17.93%

== Legislation ==
The amendment came into force when the amending act was signed into law on 11 June 2019 by Michael D. Higgins, the President of Ireland.

The concomitant Family Law Bill 2019 was published and introduced in the Dáil on 9 October 2019; among the changes to divorce laws which it proposed were those newly permitted by the constitutional amendment, namely a reduction in the separation period from four to two years, and recognition of divorces granted in the European Union and, post Brexit, in the United Kingdom and Gibraltar. The bill's second reading in the Dáil was moved by David Stanton on 16 October, and it passed remaining Dáil stages that day without opposition. On 23 October the Seanad passed the bill unamended, and then passed a motion for its early signature by the President, who accordingly signed it into law on 25 October as the Family Law Act 2019. The sections reducing the waiting time came into force on 1 December 2019; as of 10 July 2020 the sections recognising foreign divorce have not been commenced.
