= Raymond Crotty =

Irish economist and writer (1925–1994)

- Born: Raymond Dominick Crotty; 22 January 1925; Kilkenny, Ireland
- Died: 1 January 1994 (aged 68); Dublin, Ireland
- Education: St. Kieran's College; University of London; Albert Agricultural College; London School of Economics
- Occupations: Farmer; economist; writer; lecturer
- Known for: Opposition to Ireland's membership of the European Union

Raymond Dominick Crotty (22 January 1925 – 1 January 1994) was an Irish economist, writer, academic and farmer, who was known for his opposition to Ireland's membership of the European Union.

In 1987, he mounted a successful legal challenge in Crotty v An Taoiseach at the Irish Supreme Court against the Government of Ireland's attempt to ratify the Single European Act without reference to the people in a referendum.

== Life and career ==
Crotty grew up in Kilkenny. While a student at St. Kieran's College, Kilkenny, he began breeding pigs in his spare time. Rather than move on to university, Crotty pursued his interest in agriculture by going to work for a farmer relative in 1942. A year later he undertook a 12-month course at the Albert Agricultural College in Glasnevin, Dublin. In 1945, Crotty purchased a 204-acre (0.83 km^{2}) farm in Dunbell, not far from Kilkenny, and spent the next two decades putting into practice his developing knowledge of agricultural production.

In 1956, while still a farmer, Crotty enrolled as a distance-learning student at the University of London, obtaining a BSc (Econ.) degree in 1959. He spent two further years studying for a MSc (Econ.) degree at the London School of Economics. In 1961, he obtained a post as lecturer in Agricultural Economics at University of Wales, Aberystwyth. During the 1960s, Crotty sold his farm and became an economic adviser to various development agencies, including the World Bank. His work brought him to various parts of the developing world, including Latin America, India, and Africa. In 1976, he received a fellowship at the University of Sussex. In 1982, he became a lecturer in statistics at Trinity College, Dublin.

Crotty was a prolific writer, producing books, pamphlets, articles, and letters on subjects such as economics, history, and Ireland's involvement with Europe. His final work, When Histories Collide: The Development and Impact of Individualistic Capitalism, was edited by his son Raymond and published posthumously in 2001. It is an economic history of mankind from the earliest stages of human development to the present day. Reviewing it on behalf of the American Sociological Association, Professor Michael Mann of University of California, Los Angeles (UCLA) described it as "an extraordinary book by an extraordinary man" and "a must-read".

== Opposition to the European Union ==
Crotty's knowledge and experience of agricultural economics shaped his attitude to Ireland's participation in the European Economic Community. His years as a farmer taught him that Irish agriculture was structured so as to discourage efficient use of the land. As he wrote later in his memoir, A Radical's Response:

It's not how much you get out, it's how little you put in that determines financial success or failure in Irish farming.

He grew to believe that agricultural efficiency could best be achieved by the imposition of an annual land tax. This would allow taxes on inputs and outputs to be removed or reduced and would encourage only those prepared to maximise the potential of their land to remain in farming. In putting forward this proposal, Crotty was reflecting the influence of American economist Henry George, who held that land owned by private individuals should be subject to a tax on the land because of the advantage bestowed on the owner. Crotty believed that Irish agriculture would be damaged if Ireland joined the European Economic Community (EEC) as, instead of becoming more efficient, farmers would grow to depend on external subsidies under the Common Agricultural Policy.

Furthermore, Crotty maintained that Ireland's status as an ex-colony made it unsuited for membership of a bloc of nations that included former colonial powers. In 1962, in the early stages of the public debate on whether Ireland should join the EEC, Crotty expressed his concerns about the possible loss of Ireland's national identity within what he termed a "European super state". In a reference to the country's troubled history, he suggested that it was:

all the more remarkable that a people renowned for their centuries-long struggle for independence should be now ready to surrender a large measure of this independence.

In 1972, Crotty joined Trinity College academic Anthony Coughlan in opposing Ireland's accession to the EEC. Over the next twenty years Crotty campaigned against further integration of Ireland into the EEC, most notably during the attempts to ratify the Single European Act in the mid-1980s (see Crotty v. An Taoiseach). He stood for election in the 1989 European Parliament election as a candidate in the Dublin constituency. He received 25,525 votes (5.69% of the valid votes cast), not enough to elect him. In 1992, he once again allied himself with Anthony Coughlan in urging Irish voters to reject the Maastricht Treaty in the referendum held on 18 June.

Although failing to win majority support for his views in elections and referendums, Crotty continued until the end of his life his campaign against Ireland's membership of the European Union.

== Personal life ==
Raymond Crotty and his wife Bridget had seven children. He died at St. Vincent's Hospital, Dublin, at the age of 68, and is buried in Tulla Cemetery, outside Kilkenny.

== Selected publications ==
- Irish Agricultural Production, Its Volume and Structure (Cork University Press, 1966)
- Cattle, Economics and Development (Commonwealth Agricultural Bureaux, 1980)
- Raymond D. Crotty (1986). Ireland in Crisis: A Study in Capitalist Colonial Undevelopment. Brandon/Mount Eagle Publications. ISBN 978-0863220838.
- A Radical's Response (Poolbeg, 1988)
- When Histories Collide: The Development and Impact of Individualistic Capitalism (AltaMira Press, 2001)
