= Kader Asmal =

South African politician

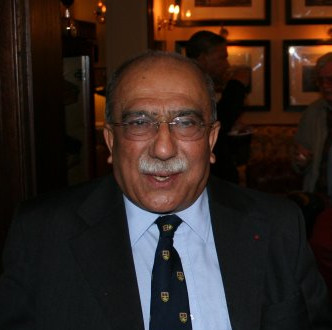
- Asmal in 2007

Minister of Education
- In office 1999–2004
- President: Thabo Mbeki
- Preceded by: Sibusiso Bengu
- Succeeded by: Naledi Pandor

Member of Parliament
- In office 1994–2008

Minister of Water Affairs and Forestry
- In office 1994–1999
- President: Nelson Mandela
- Preceded by: Magnus Malan
- Succeeded by: Ronnie Kasrils

Personal details
- Born: 8 October 1934 Durban
- Died: 22 June 2011 (aged 76)
- Party: African National Congress
- Spouse: Louise Parkinson
- Children: 2

Abdul Kader Asmal (8 October 1934 – 22 June 2011) was a lawyer in South Africa and Ireland and later a South African politician. He was a Senior Lecturer in Trinity College Dublin and a professor of human rights at the University of the Western Cape, chairman of the council of the University of the North and vice-president of the African Association of International Law. He was married to Louise Parkinson and had two sons. While living in Ireland between the 1960s and 1990s, Asmal led the Irish Anti-Apartheid Movement.

Asmal was an Honorary Fellow of the Royal College of Surgeons in Ireland, received a doctorate Honoris Causa from Queen's University Belfast (1996) and was a laureate of the 2000 Stockholm Water Prize.

== Early life ==
Born in 1934, Asmal grew up in Stanger, KwaZulu-Natal. He was the son of an Indian shopkeeper and one of seven children. When he was a schoolboy, he met Chief Albert Luthuli, who inspired him towards human rights.

Asmal's political development first began in 1952 with the Defiance Campaign, when he was asked to become the secretary of the local rate payers' association. That exposed him to the local Indian community's efforts at dealing with apartheid when the government tried to enforce the Group Areas Act in Stanger.

Later in 1952, Asmal left Stanger to attend the Springfield Teacher Training College in Durban. After graduating as a teacher in 1954, he was assigned to an all-Indian school in Darnall, KwaZulu-Natal. While at Darnall, he registered for a bachelor's degree by correspondence in English, politics, and history at UNISA.

In 1959, Asmal qualified as a teacher and moved to London, where he enrolled at the London School of Economics and Political Science. He subsequently moved to Ireland, where he became a lecturer in law at Trinity College Dublin. He held that post for 27 years, and specialized in human rights, labour and international law.

Asmal qualified as a barrister in both the London and Dublin Bars and received degrees from both the London School of Economics (LL.M. (Lond.)) and Trinity College, Dublin (M.A. (Dubl.)).

== Political career ==
While in London, Asmal started the British Anti-Apartheid Movement. Upon moving to Ireland, he founded the Irish Anti-Apartheid Movement, and he also helped to establish the Irish Council for Civil Liberties and the Divorce Action Group.

Asmal served on the ANC's constitutional committee from 1986, and returned to South Africa in 1990. He later stated that, while in Ireland in the late 1970s, he had assisted the ANC to find IRA volunteers, who did reconnaissance on South Africa's Sasolburg refinery, which was then bombed by the uMkhonto we Sizwe, the ANC's military wing in 1980.

Asmal was a board member of the Centre for Human Rights at the University of Pretoria.

=== Minister of Water Affairs ===
Shortly after returning to South Africa in 1990, Asmal was elected to the ANC's National Executive Committee. In 1993, he served as a member of the negotiating team of the ANC at the Multiparty Negotiating Forum. In May 1994, he was elected to the National Assembly, and he joined the Cabinet, as Minister of Water Affairs and Forestry.

In 1996, World Wide Fund for Nature-South Africa awarded Asmal their gold medal for his conservation work. During his tenure, he supported the Global Water Partnership of which he was a patron. As Minister of Water Affairs and Forestry he spearheaded the recognition of the concept of "the environment as a prime water user". While serving as Minister of Water Affairs and Forestry, he also served as the chairman of the World Commission on Dams (1997–2001). His work as Minister of Water Affairs is widely regarded as successful, which was attributed largely to his ability to work with the still-largely Afrikaner civil service.

=== Minister of Education ===
Although Asmal was not as close to President Thabo Mbeki as he was to President Nelson Mandela, he was promoted to Minister of Education in 1999 after that year's general elections. Among his initiatives as Minister of Education was the launching in 2001 of the South African History Project "to promote and enhance the conditions and status of the learning and teaching of history in the South African schooling system, with the goal of restoring its material position and intellectual purchase in the classroom".

Given the vast inequalities in the education system that were inherited from the apartheid regime, the post was seen by many as a poisoned chalice. After rolling back some of the ANC's more ambitious education policies to make his brief more realistic, he managed to introduce some of the most significant and far-reaching changes to the country's education system in its history. One of his most controversial moves as Minister of Education was to threaten South African universities with quotas if they failed to apply affirmative action policies to their students and staff. Asmal decide to close down all Teacher Training Colleges as well as certain Technical Colleges. Outcome-based education was introduced during his tenure, and scrapped a few years later.

=== Backbencher ===
In 2004, Asmal left government but would remain in Parliament until 2008.

On 5 October 2007, he severely criticised Robert Mugabe for the situation in Zimbabwe, lamenting that he had not spoken previously, at the launch of a book Through the Darkness – A Life in Zimbabwe, by Judith Todd, daughter of Southern Rhodesia Prime Minister Garfield Todd, an opponent of white minority rule under Ian Smith.

Asmal resigned from parliament in 2008 in protest against the ANC's disbanding of the elite Scorpions anti-crime unit. He felt it was a poor decision and that it was improper that politicians who had been investigated and found by the Scorpions to be engaged in corruption then took part in the vote to disband the organisation.

== Later life ==
Asmal called for the controversial Protection of State Information Bill (also known as the "Secrecy Bill") to be scrapped.

He published an autobiography, Politics in my Blood.

He died in 2011 after suffering a heart attack.
