= 2018 Irish referendum =

2018 Irish referendum can refer to either

- Thirty-sixth Amendment of the Constitution of Ireland which related to abortion rights and took place on 25 May 2018 or,
- Thirty-seventh Amendment of the Constitution of Ireland which removed the offence of blasphemy from the constitution, it took place on 26 October 2018.
