= Tara Burns =

Irish barrister, Court of Appeal judge

The Hon. Ms. Justice Tara Burns

Judge of the Court of Appeal
- Incumbent
- Assumed office 4 July 2023
- Nominated by: Government of Ireland
- Appointed by: Michael D. Higgins

Judge of the High Court
- In office 28 June 2018 – 4 July 2023
- Nominated by: Government of Ireland
- Appointed by: Michael D. Higgins

Personal details
- Born: Hamilton, Ontario, Canada
- Education: University College Dublin; King's Inns

Tara Burns is an Irish judge who has served as a Judge of the Court of Appeal since July 2023. She previously served as a Judge of the High Court from 2018 to 2023. She was the Chairperson of the Referendum Commission for a 2019 referendum on divorce.

She formerly practiced as a barrister specialising in criminal law and has continued to focus on criminal trials while serving on the bench.

== Early life ==
Burns was born in Hamilton, Ontario, Canada, but grew up in Sligo, Ireland. She attended Mercy College, Sligo. She obtained a BCL from University College Dublin in 1993.

== Legal career ==
Burns was a barrister from 1995 and became a senior counsel in 2013. She frequently appeared in criminal cases for both defendants and the Director of Public Prosecutions. She appeared on behalf of the Garda Commissioner at the Morris Tribunal in 2002 and represented Superintendent Dave Taylor at the Disclosures Tribunal. She also often practised on the Midland and Northern Circuits.

== Judicial career ==
=== High Court ===
Burns was appointed a judge of the High Court on 28 June 2018. She has heard cases involving sexual offences and homicide.

In November 2018, she was assigned to the Special Criminal Court. She was the judge in charge of the Asylum List of the High Court in 2020.

==== Referendum Commission ====
She was appointed chairperson of the Referendum Commission in February 2019 for the May 2019 referendum to amend the Constitution. Burns attended events around Ireland to promote voter participation in the referendum, including a ceremony to confer Irish citizenship on 2,500 people. The Commission spent €2.34 million. Burns endorsed the idea of having a permanent electoral commission and modernising the voter registration system.

=== Court of Appeal ===
She was nominated for appointment to the Court of Appeal in May 2023. She was appointed in July 2023.
