= Ardagh v Maguire =

Irish Supreme Court case

Ardagh v Maguire [2002] IESC 21
- Coat of arms of Ireland
- Court: Supreme Court of Ireland
- Decided: 11 April 2002
- Citation: [2002] IESC 21; [2002] 1 IR 385
- Transcript: https://www.bailii.org/ie/cases/IESC/2002/21.html

Case history
- Prior action: Maguire v Ardagh [2001] IEHC 133
- Appealed from: High Court of Ireland

Court membership
- Judges sitting: Keane C.J., Denham, Murphy, Murray, McGuinness, Hardiman, Geoghegan

Case opinions
- The Court ruled that the holding of an inquiry concerning the case of a fatal shooting of a member of the Garda Síochána by the Houses of the Oireachtas was an ultra vires act.

Keywords
- Constitution of Ireland; Ultra Vires; Garda Síochána

Ardagh v Maguire [2002] IESC 21; [2002] 1 IR 385 is a landmark Irish Supreme Court case on the separation of powers under the Constitution of Ireland. The Court ruled that the holding of an inquiry by the Joint Oireachtas [national parliament] Subcommittee was acting outside the constitutional powers of the Houses of the Oireachtas. The inquiry concerned the case of the fatal shooting of John Carthy at Abbeylara (the Abbeylara case) on the 20 April 2000 by members of the Garda Síochána.

The case addressed the legal authority of the national parliament in Ireland to carry out investigations which could lead "to adverse findings of fact and conclusions" and could damage the reputation of persons who are not members of the Houses of Oireachtas.

== Background ==
The Garda Síochána announced that they would be carrying out an internal investigation on 20 April 2000 concerning the fatal shooting of John Carthy in Abbeylara by gardaí but that the findings of the report would not be made public. In response to criticism from the public and from the Carthy family of the Garda inquiry, the Garda Síochána requested an investigation by the Federal Bureau of Inverstigation (FBI) of the United States into their handling of the Abbeylara case. The FBI concluded that the Gardaí had waited too long to fatally shoot Mr Carthy and that "to allow Mr Carthy to cross the inner perimeter armed after he had repeatedly ignored warnings and had previously aimed and fired his shotgun at Garda officers was inconsistent with accepted law enforcement practices in the United States."

In response to further calls for a full public inquiry into the Abbeylara case, an Oireachtas sub-committee was established by the government to investigate the conduct of the Garda Síochána. The sub-committee was unable to complete its task and was adjourned on 30 April 2001 after nine members of the Garda Emergency Response Unit (ERU) applied for immunity from giving evidence during the inquiry. On 23 November 2001, the High Court upheld a challenge by the Garda Síochána to the Oireachtas sub-committee. The court found that the conducting of such an inquiry by members of the Houses of Oireachtas was unconstitutional.

== Holding of the Supreme Court ==
The court upheld the High Court decision in Maguire v Ardagh [2001] IEHC 133 by a majority of 5-2. The ground upon which The Supreme Court had ruled this committee unconstitutional was that the Oireachtas has "no explicit, implicit or inherent power to conduct an inquiry" which could lead "to adverse findings of fact and conclusions (including a finding of unlawful killing) as to the personal culpability of an individual not a member of the Oireachtas so as to impugn their good name is ultra vires in that the holding of such an inquiry is not within the inherent powers of the Oireachtas".

== Subsequent developments ==
=== Thirtieth Amendment of the Constitution Bill 2011 ===
The Oireachtas Sub-committee inquiry led to the proposal of the Thirtieth Amendment of the Constitution Bill 2011 which was designed to reverse the judgement. This Amendment was passed by both houses of the Oireachtas but was subsequently rejected by the people of Ireland in a referendum held on the 27 October 2011.

=== Barr Tribunal ===
Within a week of the Supreme Court judgement, the establishment of the Barr Tribunal to investigate the circumstances surrounding the death of John Carthy was decided upon. The Barr Tribunal published its findings on 20 July 2006 in which it criticized the conduct of the Garda Síochána, listing basic errors in relation to the control of the siege and in relation to the dealing with mental illnesses. Mr Justice Robert Barr, who was the sole member of the Tribunal, concluded "I have no doubt that the Garda management of the siege at Abbeylara and related matters were defective in the foregoing respects and fell far short of what was required to contend with the situation successfully and to minimize the risk to life." In addition to these findings, Mr Justice Barr was also highly critical of the Irish media in their reporting on the case.

== See also ==
- Death of John Carthy
- Thirtieth Amendment of the Constitution Bill 2011
- Abbeylara
- Barr Tribunal
- List of notable Irish public inquiries
