= Kevin Cross =

Kevin Cross may refer to:

- Kevin Cross (judge) (born 1951), Irish judge
- Kevin Cross Jr. (born 2000), American basketball player
- Kevin Cross, rhythm guitarist with Trophy Eyes
- Kevin Cross, a character from the British soap opera Brookside, played by Stuart Organ
