= Referendum Act =

Referendum Act may refer to:

- Referendum Act 1998, a public Act of the Oireachtas, the Parliament of the Republic of Ireland, which regulated future referendums within the Republic of Ireland
- Referendum Act 1975, a public Act of the Parliament of the United Kingdom which provided for the European Communities membership referendum of 1975
- Referendum Act (Taiwan), 2004 law of Taiwan
