= Eleventh Amendment of the Constitution of Ireland =

Amendment on Maastricht Treaty

- 18 June 1992
- To permit the state to ratify the Maastricht Treaty

Results
Choice	Votes	%
Yes	1,001,076	69.05%
No	448,655	30.95%
Valid votes	1,449,731	99.49%
Invalid or blank votes	7,488	0.51%
Total votes	1,457,219	100.00%
Registered voters/turnout	2,542,840	57.31%

The Eleventh Amendment of the Constitution Act 1992 (previously bill no. 12 of 1992) is an amendment to the Constitution of Ireland which permitted the state to ratify the Treaty on European Union, commonly known as the Maastricht Treaty. It was approved by referendum on 18 June 1992 and signed into law on 16 July of the same year.

== Overview ==
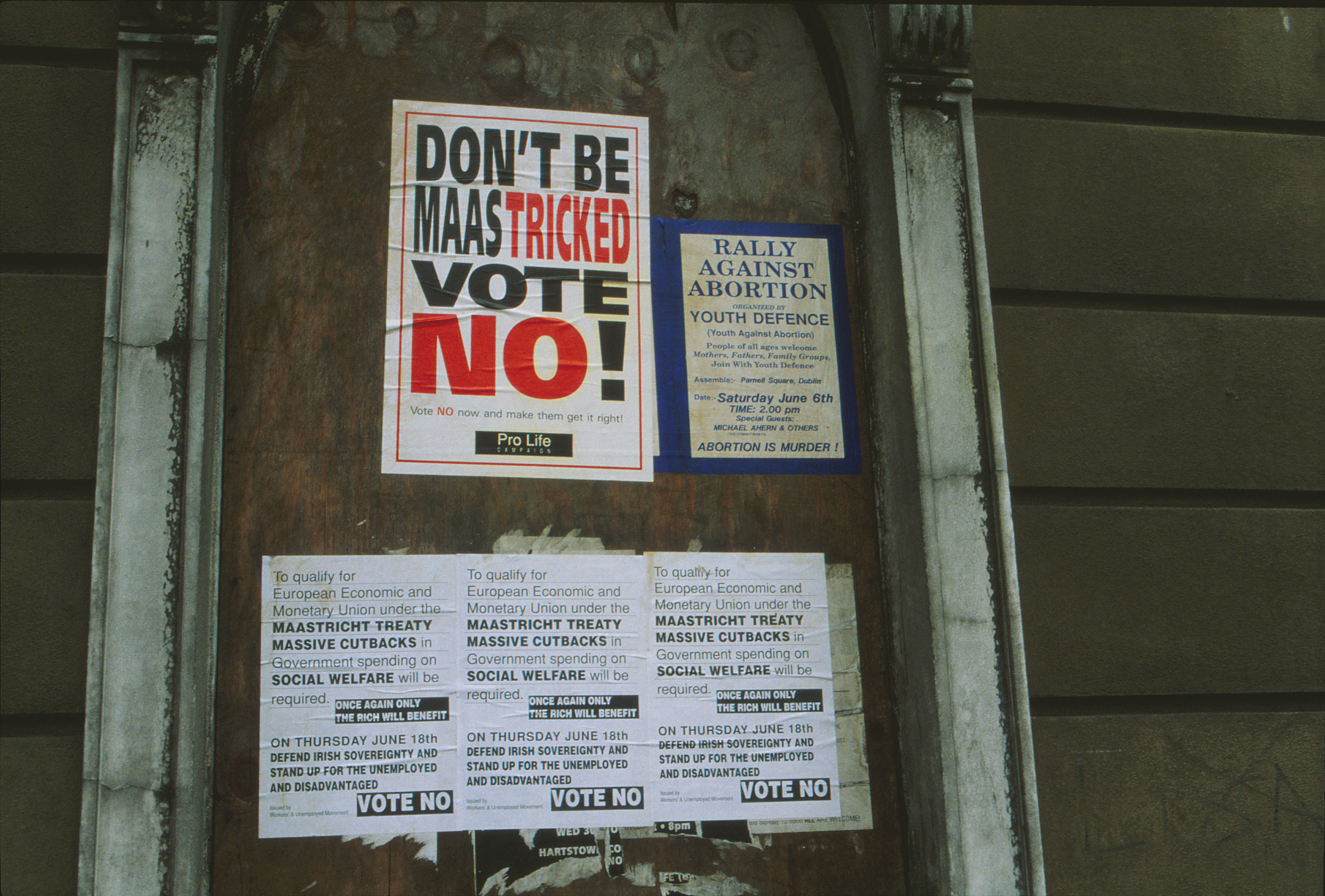
Posters against the ratification of the Maastricht Treaty. Dublin, Ireland (1992).

The Eleventh Amendment of the Constitution was one of a number of amendments that have been made to expressly permit the state to ratify changes to the founding treaties of the European Union (then known as the European Community) (others have been the Tenth, Eighteenth, Twenty-sixth and the Twenty-eighth Amendments). These amendments were all adopted because of the finding of the Supreme Court in Crotty v. An Taoiseach (1987) that major changes to the treaties are unconstitutional unless accompanied by an amendment.

The Eleventh Amendment was introduced by a Fianna Fáil–Progressive Democrats coalition government and was also supported by opposition parties Fine Gael and the Labour Party. Democratic Left and the Green Party were opposed to it. Some anti-abortion groups also opposed the treaty, arguing that it might lead to legalised abortion in Ireland.

== Changes to the text ==
The Eleventh Amendment amended Article 29.4 by the deletion of the highlighted sentence from subsection 3°:

3° The State may become a member of the European Coal and Steel Community (established by Treaty signed at Paris on the 18th day of April, 1951), the European Economic Community (established by Treaty signed at Rome on the 25th day of March, 1957) and the European Atomic Energy Community (established by Treaty signed at Rome on the 25th day of March, 1957). The State may ratify the Single European Act (signed on behalf of the Member States of the Communities at Luxembourg on the 17th day of February, 1986, and at The Hague on the 28th day of February, 1986). ~~No provision of this Constitution invalidates laws enacted, acts done or measures adopted by the State necessitated by the obligations of membership of the Communities, or prevents laws enacted, acts done or measures adopted by the Communities, or institutions thereof, from having the force of law in the State.~~

and by the addition of the following subsections:

4° The State may ratify the Treaty on European Union signed at Maastricht on the 7th day of February, 1992, and may become a member of that Union.

5° No provision of this Constitution invalidates laws enacted, acts done or measures adopted by the State which are necessitated by the obligations of membership of the European Union or of the Communities, or prevents laws enacted, acts done or measures adopted by the European Union or by the Communities or by institutions thereof, or by bodies competent under the Treaties establishing the Communities, from having the force of law in the State.

6° The State may ratify the Agreement relating to Community Patents drawn up between the Member States of the Communities and done at Luxembourg on the 15th day of December, 1989.

== Result ==
Eleventh Amendment of the Constitution of Ireland referendum
Choice	Votes	%
For	1,001,076	69.05
Against	448,655	30.95
Total	1,449,731	100.00
Valid votes	1,449,731	99.49
Invalid/blank votes	7,488	0.51
Total votes	1,457,219	100.00
Registered voters/turnout	2,542,840	57.31

Results by constituency
Constituency	Electorate	Turnout (%)	Votes		Proportion of votes	
Constituency	Electorate	Turnout (%)	Yes	No	Yes	No
Carlow–Kilkenny	81,192	59.2%	34,180	13,633	71.5%	28.5%
Cavan–Monaghan	79,004	52.7%	28,916	12,382	70.1%	29.9%
Clare	67,558	53.9%	26,984	9,264	74.5%	25.5%
Cork East	58,159	61.5%	24,738	10,863	69.5%	30.5%
Cork North-Central	64,497	57.7%	24,285	12,800	65.5%	34.5%
Cork North-West	42,058	62.9%	18,481	7,773	70.4%	29.6%
Cork South-Central	82,853	62.9%	36,653	15,218	70.7%	29.3%
Cork South-West	43,753	61.0%	18,689	7,846	70.5%	29.5%
Donegal North-East	46,934	50.9%	14,063	9,737	59.1%	40.9%
Donegal South-West	48,494	48.8%	13,724	9,837	58.3%	41.7%
Dublin Central	63,411	56.6%	21,216	14,488	59.5%	40.5%
Dublin North	56,412	59.2%	24,488	8,789	73.6%	26.4%
Dublin North-Central	55,376	65.3%	23,526	12,524	65.3%	34.7%
Dublin North-East	55,024	61.5%	21,469	12,238	63.7%	36.3%
Dublin North-West	47,937	57.8%	15,642	11,874	56.9%	43.1%
Dublin South	87,322	63.0%	40,569	14,267	74.0%	26.0%
Dublin South-Central	71,052	57.8%	25,718	15,140	63.0%	37.0%
Dublin South-East	60,630	54.2%	21,603	11,061	66.2%	33.8%
Dublin South-West	69,654	54.9%	24,847	13,250	65.3%	34.7%
Dublin West	82,641	55.9%	30,236	15,861	65.6%	34.4%
Dún Laoghaire	83,369	62.3%	38,396	13,362	74.2%	25.8%
Galway East	43,219	53.9%	17,306	5,780	75.0%	25.0%
Galway West	81,292	50.7%	27,669	13,340	67.5%	32.5%
Kerry North	48,606	52.5%	16,313	9,006	64.5%	35.5%
Kerry South	44,034	52.9%	15,495	7,633	67.0%	33.0%
Kildare	85,073	55.0%	34,314	12,275	73.7%	26.3%
Laois–Offaly	77,226	58.5%	30,409	14,470	67.8%	32.2%
Limerick East	69,025	58.5%	29,059	11,134	72.3%	27.7%
Limerick West	44,768	57.2%	18,241	7,152	71.9%	28.1%
Longford–Westmeath	64,098	56.3%	26,486	9,364	73.9%	26.1%
Louth	65,666	58.9%	26,925	11,446	70.2%	29.8%
Mayo East	40,336	52.4%	15,603	5,434	74.2%	25.8%
Mayo West	40,654	53.0%	16,076	5,424	74.8%	25.2%
Meath	82,133	56.1%	32,608	13,204	71.2%	28.8%
Roscommon	40,690	59.4%	17,242	6,755	71.9%	28.1%
Sligo–Leitrim	60,675	55.3%	23,826	9,461	71.6%	28.4%
Tipperary North	42,633	60.0%	17,052	8,343	67.2%	32.8%
Tipperary South	56,705	60.2%	22,810	11,148	67.2%	32.8%
Waterford	63,692	58.0%	26,923	9,850	73.3%	26.7%
Wexford	75,553	57.0%	30,347	12,491	70.9%	29.1%
Wicklow	69,432	58.9%	27,949	12,738	68.7%	31.3%
Total	2,542,840	57.3%	1,001,076	448,655	69.1%	30.9%

== See also ==
- Third Amendment of the Constitution of Ireland (Membership of the European Communities)
- Politics of the Republic of Ireland
- History of the Republic of Ireland
- Constitutional amendment
