= European Communities Act 1972 (Ireland) =

Oireachtas
- Long title: An Act to make provision with respect to membership of the state of the European Communities.
- Citation: No. 27 of 1972
- Enacted by: Dáil Éireann
- Signed by: Presidential Commission
- Signed: 6 December 1972
- Commenced: 6 December 1972 (partly in force); 1 January 1973 (wholly in force)

Related legislation
- Third Amendment of the Constitution of Ireland
- Status: Amended

The European Communities Act 1972 (No. 27 of 1972) is an act of the Irish parliament, the Oireachtas, that incorporates the treaties and law of the European Union into the domestic law of Ireland. The Act did not just incorporate the law of the European Communities which existed at the time of its enactment, but incorporates legislative acts of the Community enacted subsequently. The Act also provides that government ministers may adopt statutory instruments (SIs) to implement EU law, and that those SIs are to have effect as if they were acts of parliament.

Doing either of these things would normally count as an unconstitutional delegation of the legislative power of the state. However this problem was anticipated by the adoption of the Third Amendment of the Constitution of Ireland which protects any legislation that is necessitated by the obligations of membership of the European Union.

The constitutionality of the Act's provisions regarding statutory instruments was challenged in Meagher v Minister for Agriculture on the basis that they were an unlawful delegation of legislative power by the Oireachtas. The plaintiff was successful in the High Court but the decision was reversed on appeal to the Supreme Court. The Court ruled that:

"The court is satisfied that, having regard to the number of community laws, acts done and measures adopted which either have to be facilitated in their direct application to the law of the State or have to be implemented by appropriate action into the law of the State, the obligation of membership would necessitate facilitating of these activities, in some instances, at least, and possibly in a great majority of instances, by the making of ministerial regulations rather than legislation of the Oireachtas."

== See also ==
- Crotty v. An Taoiseach (1987), a landmark decision of the Irish Supreme Court which found that Ireland could not ratify the Single European Act unless the Irish Constitution was first changed (by referendum) to permit its ratification.
