= South African History Project =

Initiative to chronicle the history of the Republic of South Africa

The South African History Project (2001-2004) was established and initiated by Professor Kader Asmal, former Minister of Education in South Africa. This initiative followed after the publication of the Manifesto on Values, Education and Democracy and the Report of the History and Archaeology Panel in South Africa in 2001.This report was written by leading scholars who advised the then Minister of Education on the strengthening of the teaching of history in South African schools after the end of apartheid. The South African History Project addressed the challenges of revitalising the teaching and learning of history by setting up provincial networks which brought stakeholders in education, heritage, tourism and publishing together for the first time in post-apartheid South Africa.

== Origin and development ==
The South African History Project came to be established as a result of a report presented by the Working Group on Values, Education and Democracy presented to then Minister of Education, Professor Kader Asmal in 2000, led by Professor Wilmot James. This report emphasised the immense value of history teaching for the promotion of human values, including tolerance. The report proposed the establishment of a panel of respected historians, educationists and academics to advise the government on how to strengthen history teaching in South African schools.

This led to the establishment of the History and Archaeology Panel in 2000, under the chairpersonship of the African novelist and academic, Professor Njabulo Ndebele, and participation of prominent academics like Dr Pallo Jordan, (Note: Jordan does not have a doctoral degree, nor is he an academic, but he can be considered an intellectual.) Professor André Odendaal, Professor Bill Nasson and others which led to the founding of the South African History Project in August 2001 at the Old Fort (now Constitution Hill) in Johannesburg. The project was funded by the Carnegie Corporation of New York until June 2004. One of the sources of inspiration was a project, conducted between South African and Danish historians and history educationalists in 1999/2000: The History for Democracy Project.

The South African History Project was established to promote and enhance the quality and status of the learning and teaching of history in schools and in higher education institutions: to encourage the recording of oral histories in a post-apartheid South Africa; to discuss and devise strategies for the strengthening and improvement of history teaching in support of the new post-apartheid National Curriculum Statement; to establish initiatives that would bring history researchers and scholars together to review, revise and write new history books and materials for schools and to initiate activities that will resurrect interest in the study of history by young people. The Curriculum Review process resultant of these recommendations was led by Dr Linda Chisholm.

The South African History Project formed national and provincial networks, communication and advocacy initiatives and organised roundtables in all provinces, in rural and urban areas with local civic organisations, teacher organisations, museums, heritage activists, parents, traditional leaders, oral history projects, local government, libraries and archives. The project managed to achieve its strategic aims under the direction of its CEO, Dr June Bam and the Chair of the Ministerial Committee, Professor Yonah Seleti (currently co-ordinator of the national Indigenous Knowledge Systems network in South Africa) and the committee members of prominent South African historians and academics: Dr Luli Callinicos (author of The World that made Mandela); Professor Uma Mesthrie-Dhupelia (well known historian and a member of the Gandhi family); Dr Sifiso Ndlovu; Dr Nomathamsanqa Tisani; Professor Albert Grundlingh; Professor Jeff Guy; Professor Jeff Pieres; archaeologist Amanda Esterhuysen; and a teacher, Lindi Nqonji. Amongst its various strategic achievements, the project conducted national audits of history books used in schools and of archaeologists and historians in South Africa. Some of the key publications include an update of the UNESCO General History of Africa, and the 6-volume series Turning Points in South African History in collaboration with the Institute for Justice and Reconciliation, winner of the UNESCO Prize for Peace Education 2008. It has also worked with the Parliamentary Millennium Project on perspectives on and of Africa, and with the NGO South African History Online (SAHO). Important publications included the teacher's guides for the Unesco Africa History volumes, distributed to all schools and libraries and the "Towards New Histories for South Africa" publication edited by Dr Shamil Jeppie.

The work of this project has now become fully integrated into the Department of Education under the new Minister of Education, Naledi Pandor. Its work through effective media strategies through radio, television and print has reached several hundred thousand South Africans, and has undoubtedly been a key transformation project in post-apartheid South African education on race equality and human rights.
