= Referendum Commission =

Statutory body which provided information on referendums in Ireland

A Referendum Commission (Irish: An Coimisiún Reifrinn) was an independent statutory body in Ireland which had been set up in advance of referendums in Ireland from 1998 to 2019. The Referendum Act 1998 as amended by the Referendum Act 2001 provided for the establishment of the body. It was superseded in 2023 by the Electoral Commission, established on a permanent basis.

== Background ==
In McKenna v. An Taoiseach (No. 2) (1995), the Supreme Court of Ireland upheld a challenge from Patricia McKenna to public expenditure to promote a Yes vote in the constitutional referendum on divorce. The Referendum Act 1998 provided for the establishment of a commission for each referendum to provide information about the contents of amendment. The first Referendum Commission was set up for the Amsterdam Treaty referendum.

== Composition ==
The 1998 Act, as amended, provided that the Chairperson of the commission should be a former judge of the Supreme Court or Court of Appeal or a serving or former judge of the High Court nominated by the Chief Justice. The other members of the commission were the Comptroller and Auditor General, the Ombudsman, the Clerk of Dáil Éireann and the Clerk of Seanad Éireann. In the event any of those offices were vacant, the 1998 Act provided that the following be appointed respectively instead: Secretary and Director of Audit of the Office of the Comptroller and Auditor General, Director of the Office of the Ombudsman, Clerk Assistant of Dáil Éireann, Clerk Assistant of Seanad Éireann.

The members of the last Referendum Commission, established for the Thirty-eighth Amendment held in 2019, were:

| Name | Role / Office |
|---|---|
| Tara Burns | Chairperson / High Court judge |
| Seamus McCarthy | Comptroller and Auditor General |
| Peter Tyndall | Ombudsman |
| Peter Finnegan | Clerk of Dáil Éireann |
| Martin Groves | Clerk of Seanad Éireann |

== Functions ==
Under the Referendum Act 1998 the commission initially had the role of setting out the arguments for and against referendum proposals, having regard to submissions received from the public. Following the passing of the Referendum Act 2001 the commission no longer had a statutory function in relation to putting the arguments for and against referendum proposals. The 2001 Act also removed from the commission the statutory function of fostering and promoting debate or discussion on referendum proposals.

A new referendum commission was set up in advance for each new referendum that took place, if the Minister for Housing, Planning and Local Government made a ministerial order to appoint a commission. The primary role of the commission was to explain the subject matter of referendum proposals, to promote public awareness of the referendum and to encourage the electorate to vote. It could use television, radio, press, outdoor and cinema advertising and any other media over the weeks in advance of the referendum to give general information about the issues involved. It could help citizens find out some basic information about how to register to vote. The commission's information booklets were also produced in braille and audiotape for persons with visual impairments. A publication in Irish Sign Language was also produced. A dedicated website was created for the referendum.

Once the commission completed its functions it furnished a report to the Minister, within six months. The report detailed the carrying out of its functions, and the commission then dissolved one month after its submission.

== List of commissions ==
| Date established | Subject | Date of referendum | Referendum | Chairperson | Cost | References |
|---|---|---|---|---|---|---|
| 2 March 1998 | Treaty of Amsterdam | 22 May 1998 | 18th Amendment | Thomas Finlay | £2.2m | |
| 22 April 1998 | Good Friday Agreement | 22 May 1998 | 19th Amendment | Thomas Finlay | £2.1m | |
| 4 May 1999 | Local government | 11 June 1999 | 20th Amendment | Thomas Finlay | £0.6m | |
| 17 April 2001 | Death penalty | 7 June 2001 | 21st Amendment | Thomas Finlay | £0.8m | |
| 17 April 2001 | International Criminal Court | 7 June 2001 | 23rd Amendment | Thomas Finlay | £0.8m | |
| 17 April 2001 | Treaty of Nice | 7 June 2001 | 24th Amendment Bill 2001 | Thomas Finlay | £1.2m | |
| 8 February 2002 | Abortion | 6 March 2002 | 25th Amendment Bill 2001 | Frederick Morris | €2.6m | |
| 9 July 2002 | Treaty of Nice | 19 October 2002 | 26th Amendment | Thomas Finlay | €4.1m | |
| 22 April 2004 | Irish Citizenship | 11 June 2004 | 27th Amendment | Nicholas Kearns | €3.1m | |
| 6 March 2008 | Treaty of Lisbon | 12 June 2008 | 28th Amendment Bill 2008 | Iarfhlaith O'Neill | €4.9m | |
| 7 July 2009 | Treaty of Lisbon | 2 October 2009 | 28th Amendment | Frank Clarke | €4.1m | |
| 5 September 2011 | Judges' Remuneration | 27 October 2011 | 29th Amendment | Bryan MacMahon | €0.6m | |
| 13 September 2011 | Oireachtas Inquiries | 27 October 2011 | 30th Amendment Bill 2011 | Bryan MacMahon | €0.6m | |
| 30 March 2012 | European Fiscal Compact | 31 May 2012 | 30th Amendment | Kevin Feeney | €2.0m | |
| 19 September 2012 | Children's rights | 10 November 2012 | 31st Amendment | Mary Finlay Geoghegan | €1.7m | |
| 6 June 2013 | Abolition of Seanad Éireann | 4 October 2013 | 32nd Amendment Bill 2013 | Elizabeth Dunne | €2.4m | |
| 6 June 2013 | Court of Appeal | 4 October 2013 | 33rd Amendment | Elizabeth Dunne | €2.4m | |
| 27 January 2015 | Same-sex marriage | 22 May 2015 | 34th Amendment | Kevin Cross | €1.1m | |
| 27 January 2015 | Age of candidacy for Presidency | 22 May 2015 | 35th Amendment Bill 2015 | Kevin Cross | €1.0m | |
| 9 March 2018 | Abortion | 25 May 2018 | 36th Amendment | Isobel Kennedy | €2.5m | |
| 18 July 2018 | Blasphemy | 26 October 2018 | 37th Amendment | Isobel Kennedy | €2.1m | |
| 26 February 2019 | Divorce | 24 May 2019 | 38th Amendment | Tara Burns | €2.3m | |

== Repeal ==
The Electoral Reform Act 2022 repealed the Referendum Act 1998. The Electoral Commission established under the same act was given the equivalent functions as Referendum Commission. The Commission was established in 2023.

== See also ==
- Amendments to the Constitution of Ireland
- Constitution of Ireland
