= Twenty-ninth Amendment of the Constitution of Ireland =

Amendment on the reduction of judges' salaries

- 27 October 2011
- To relax the prohibition on the reduction of judges' salaries

Results
Choice	Votes	%
Yes	1,393,877	79.74%
No	354,134	20.26%
Valid votes	1,748,011	97.89%
Invalid or blank votes	37,696	2.11%
Total votes	1,785,707	100.00%
Registered voters/turnout	3,191,157	55.96%

The Twenty-ninth Amendment of the Constitution Act 2011 (previously bill no. 44 of 2011) is an amendment to the Constitution of Ireland which relaxes the previous prohibition on the reduction of the salaries of Irish judges. It was approved by a referendum on 27 October 2011 signed into law on 17 November 2011. It was held on the same day as a referendum on Oireachtas Inquiries, which was rejected, and the presidential election at which Michael D. Higgins was elected.

== Background ==
The Constitution of Ireland, since its enactment in 1937, had contained a prohibition on reducing the pay of a judge during their term of office. This was intended to protect judicial independence, by preventing the government from using the threat of a pay reduction to dissuade judges from exercising judicial review in a manner which the government might find inconvenient.

In 2008 the Irish economy entered a severe recession, which was still ongoing in 2011, and had caused the state's revenues to fall sharply. Among the budgetary responses taken by the government in 2008–09 were the Financial Emergency Measures in the Public Interest Act 2009 (a levy on pension contributions made by public sector workers) and the Financial Emergency Measures in the Public Interest (No. 2) Act 2009 (a reduction in public sector pay). Paul Gallagher, the Attorney General, advised the government that this could not be applied to judges because of the constitutional prohibition. The government asked judges to pay the levy voluntarily, and 125 out of 147 did so.

Fine Gael TD Alan Shatter, then in opposition, introduced a private member's bill in 2009 to amend the constitution to allow pay cuts for judges. He argued that encouraging a "voluntary" levy amounted to political pressure on judges. The bill did not receive a second reading.

Some legal experts disagreed with Paul Gallagher's 2008 view that the Constitution precluded the pension levy from applying to judges. Columnist Vincent Browne claimed that the 2011 amendment was unnecessary, on the basis of a 1950s court ruling that the government is entitled to levy income tax rates on judge's pay, thereby reducing their disposable income; Browne argued that a general cut in public pay is similar to a general rise in tax rates, and judges therefore have no exemption. The Irish Council for Civil Liberties concurred, as did Patrick O'Brien, who described the amendment as "a classic example of hard cases making bad law. The new Article 35.5 closely addresses a very specific situation but has uncertain application outside of it."

The agreed programme of the government elected in March 2011 committed to holding referendums "on a priority basis" on five subjects, including judges' pay. The cabinet agreed on 14 June to hold a referendum on the same day as the 2011 presidential election in the autumn. The wording of the amendment was approved by the cabinet and published by the Department of Justice and Equality on 26 July. The following day, the election and referendums were set for Thursday 17 October.

In June 2011, a retiring district court judge said the plan did not "make economic sense" because the cost of holding the referendum would exceed the money saved by the ensuing pay cuts. Alan Shatter claimed in October that the referendum would enable pay cuts worth €5.5m per annum to the Irish Exchequer.

Judges produced a memorandum for the government in July 2011, which argued that making judges' pay subject to laws made by the Oireachtas would compromise their independence, and suggested that instead an independent body should be empowered to reduce judges' pay. The memorandum was leaked to The Irish Times and later published in full on the website of the Courts Service. Minister Alan Shatter asked for it to be removed, arguing that it was an inappropriate place to publish it. There were rumours that some judges would retire rather than accept a pay cut. The memorandum concludes:

This memorandum is not prepared in opposition to an amendment of the Constitution so as to ensure that judges bear a fair share of the burden of pay reductions, but rather proposes that, if this is to be achieved, the essence of constitutional independence must be safeguarded by means of an independent adjudication on what these reductions should be.

== Change to the text ==
The Twenty-ninth Amendment deleted the following Article 35.5 of the Constitution:

The remuneration of a judge shall not be reduced during his continuance in office.

and substituted that section with the following:

1° The remuneration of judges shall not be reduced during their continuance in office save in accordance with this section.

2° The remuneration of judges is subject to the imposition of taxes, levies or other charges that are imposed by law on persons generally or persons belonging to a particular class.

3° Where, before or after the enactment of this section, reductions have been or are made by law to the remuneration of persons belonging to classes of persons whose remuneration is paid out of public money and such law states that those reductions are in the public interest, provision may also be made by law to make proportionate reductions to the remuneration of judges.

== Oireachtas debate ==
Minister for Justice and Equality Alan Shatter, who had proposed a similar amendment as a PMB (see above), proposed the Twenty-ninth Amendment of the Constitution (Judges' Remuneration) Bill 2011 in Dáil Éireann on 14 September 2011 on behalf of the Fine Gael–Labour Party coalition government. It had the support of all parties in the Dáil and passed the remaining stages later that day. It passed all stages in Seanad Éireann on 21 September, with one amendment; its final passage was opposed by senators David Norris and Rónán Mullen. On 22 September, the Dáil accepted the amendment from the Seanad, which consisted of the deletion of the words "into law" after the clause "before or after the enactment of this section" in the proposed subsection 3°. The bill proceeded to a referendum on 27 October 2011, on the same date as the presidential election and a referendum on proposed constitutional amendment relating to Oireachtas inquiries.

== Campaign ==
A Referendum Commission was established by Environment, Community and Local Government Phil Hogan. It was chaired by Bryan McMahon, a former judge of the High Court. Its role was to prepare statements containing a general explanation of the subject matter of the proposal and of the text of the proposal in the amendment bill. On 11 October, the commission launched a media information campaign and began distributing an information booklet to households in the state.

In September The Irish Times commented that "no body of opinion has yet emerged to oppose the amendment". In the Irish Independent, Dearbhail McDonald criticised both proposed amendments as "evidence of a new strain of executive mission creep: a barely disguised power grab by politicians to undermine the separation of powers." Former Chief Justice Ronan Keane described the wording as "dangerously vague". It was later alleged shortly after the death of Supreme Court justice Adrian Hardiman in 2016 that he had threatened to resign if the referendum passed. In a letter published on 24 October, eight former Attorneys General opposed the amendment arguing that, "The proposal to allow proportionate reductions in judicial remuneration (which we support in principle) provides insufficient protection for the independence of the judiciary."

In October, The Irish Times commented that coverage of the presidential election limited public debate on the two referendums being held the same day.

== Opinion polls ==
Date	Poller	Commissioned by	Yes	No	Undecided/ Abstain	Ref
22 July	Ipsos MRBI	The Irish Times	94	3	3	
8 October	Ipsos MRBI	The Irish Times	88	4	8 (Note: 3% abstain, 5% undecided.)	
23 October	Behaviour & Attitudes	The Sunday Times	87	8	5	
25 October	Ipsos MRBI	The Irish Times	85	7	8	

== Result ==
The result was announced on 29 October 2011 shortly after 7 pm in Dublin Castle by returning officer Riona Ní Fhlanghaile. The total poll was about 20,000 less than for the presidential election, which was held at the same time and places with the same electorate.

Twenty-Ninth Amendment of the Constitution Bill 2011
Choice	Votes	%
For	1,393,877	79.74
Against	354,134	20.26
Total	1,748,011	100.00
Valid votes	1,748,011	97.89
Invalid/blank votes	37,696	2.11
Total votes	1,785,707	100.00
Registered voters/turnout	3,191,157	55.96

Results by constituency
Constituency	Electorate	Turnout (%)	Votes		Proportion of votes	
Constituency	Electorate	Turnout (%)	Yes	No	Yes	No
Carlow–Kilkenny	106,810	55.5%	47,454	10,332	82.2%	17.8%
Cavan–Monaghan	98,952	59.0%	45,487	11,195	80.3%	19.7%
Clare	81,419	58.0%	37,196	8,749	80.9%	19.1%
Cork East	82,731	54.8%	35,949	8,339	81.2%	18.8%
Cork North-Central	75,622	54.9%	32,629	8,071	80.2%	19.8%
Cork North-West	62,113	60.6%	29,601	7,195	80.5%	19.5%
Cork South-Central	91,716	58.4%	42,116	10,510	80.0%	20.0%
Cork South-West	60,248	59.4%	28,425	6,429	81.5%	18.5%
Donegal North-East	58,579	48.6%	20,583	7,167	74.2%	25.8%
Donegal South-West	64,158	48.3%	22,849	7,144	76.2%	23.8%
Dublin Central	54,500	51.6%	21,191	6,508	76.5%	23.5%
Dublin Mid-West	64,370	52.9%	27,242	6,395	81.0%	19.0%
Dublin North	69,347	57.2%	31,725	7,460	81.0%	19.0%
Dublin North-Central	51,929	63.9%	25,962	6,735	79.4%	20.6%
Dublin North-East	57,627	59.7%	27,070	6,930	79.6%	20.4%
Dublin North-West	50,410	50.2%	19,736	5,165	79.3%	20.7%
Dublin South	104,145	61.9%	50,100	13,629	78.6%	21.4%
Dublin South-Central	77,688	53.3%	31,326	9,387	76.9%	23.1%
Dublin South-East	55,533	55.1%	21,633	8,618	71.5%	28.5%
Dublin South-West	69,977	52.3%	29,001	7,088	80.4%	19.6%
Dublin West	61,583	58.9%	28,714	7,154	80.1%	19.9%
Dún Laoghaire	82,033	59.8%	36,631	11,825	75.6%	24.4%
Galway East	81,896	57.3%	36,892	8,638	81.0%	19.0%
Galway West	94,700	53.4%	38,812	10,455	78.8%	21.2%
Kerry North–West Limerick	63,068	54.6%	26,728	6,721	79.9%	20.1%
Kerry South	57,776	55.1%	24,693	6,201	79.9%	20.1%
Kildare North	76,623	56.7%	34,587	8,257	80.7%	19.3%
Kildare South	57,933	53.9%	24,779	5,873	80.8%	19.2%
Laois–Offaly	107,023	55.3%	46,640	11,090	80.8%	19.2%
Limerick	66,345	55.4%	28,783	6,975	80.5%	19.5%
Limerick City	66,421	52.1%	27,685	6,277	81.5%	18.5%
Longford–Westmeath	85,911	52.8%	35,199	9,003	79.6%	20.4%
Louth	102,941	56.3%	45,117	11,774	79.3%	20.7%
Mayo	97,714	54.8%	42,678	9,372	82.0%	18.0%
Meath East	65,477	54.0%	28,221	6,553	81.2%	18.8%
Meath West	63,111	52.3%	25,845	6,469	80.0%	20.0%
Roscommon–South Leitrim	60,416	60.2%	27,678	7,665	78.3%	21.7%
Sligo–North Leitrim	62,152	55.0%	26,321	7,041	78.9%	21.1%
Tipperary North	62,603	61.1%	29,975	7,129	80.8%	19.2%
Tipperary South	56,295	57.9%	25,498	6,147	80.6%	19.4%
Waterford	78,960	54.1%	33,453	8,249	80.2%	19.8%
Wexford	108,490	53.9%	46,783	10,388	81.8%	18.2%
Wicklow	93,812	61.5%	44,890	11,832	79.1%	20.9%
Total	3,191,157	55.9%	1,393,877	354,134	79.7%	20.3%

== Implementation ==
In accordance with the Referendum Act 1994, the returning officer issued a provisional referendum certificate stating the results of the referendum, which was published in Iris Oifigiúil on 4 November 2011. No petition challenging the result was lodged with the High Court within seven days, so the certificate became final. All bills must be signed into law by the President. This was done on 17 November 2011 by Michael D. Higgins, who had been elected president on the same day as the referendum.

The Financial Emergency Measures in the Public Interest (Amendment) Bill 2011 was proposed in the Dáil on 29 November by Minister for Public Expenditure and Reform Brendan Howlin, to amend the 2009 Acts so as to apply to judges. It was passed by the Dáil later that day, to amend the 2009 Acts so as to apply to judges. It was passed by the Seanad on 7 December; it was signed into law on 19 December 2011 and came into force on 1 January 2012.
