= Referendum Act 1998 =

The Referendum Act 1998 (No. 1/1998) is an act of the Oireachtas which modified how referendums are carried out in Ireland. The act was necessary following the McKenna case in which the Supreme Court of Ireland held that the spending of public money in support of the campaign for a government-approved outcome of a constitutional referendum was unconstitutional. To rectify the imbalance, this act was introduced. Its main provision was to provide for the establishment of a Referendum Commission prior to each future referendum.
