= Thirtieth Amendment of the Constitution Bill 2011 =

Proposal to provide for the Houses of the Oireachtas to conduct full inquiries

- 27 October 2011
- To provide for the Houses of the Oireachtas to conduct full inquiries

Results
Choice	Votes	%
Yes	812,008	46.66%
No	928,175	53.34%
Valid votes	1,740,183	97.48%
Invalid or blank votes	45,025	2.52%
Total votes	1,785,208	100.00%
Registered voters/turnout	3,191,157	55.94%

The Thirtieth Amendment of the Constitution (Houses of the Oireachtas Inquiries) Bill 2011 (bill no. 47 of 2011) was a proposed amendment to the Constitution of Ireland to provide for the Houses of the Oireachtas to conduct full inquiries. The bill was passed by both houses of the Oireachtas, but rejected at a referendum held on 27 October 2011.

== Background ==
On 20 April 2000 in Abbeylara, John Carthy, who had bipolar affective disorder, barricaded himself into his residence with a shotgun in a dispute over plans to move to a new house. The Garda Emergency Response Unit (ERU) was called to the scene, and after a 25-hour siege, Carthy was shot dead. Carthy's family claimed the Garda had mishandled the situation and that a planned Garda internal inquiry would be inadequate. On 8 March 2001, the Oireachtas Joint Committee on Justice, Equality, Defence and Women's Rights established a "Sub-Committee on the Abbeylara Incident". Although the Carthy family wanted an independent Tribunal of Inquiry, an Oireachtas inquiry was preferred as being cheaper and quicker. It planned to complete its investigation in three weeks and then issue conclusions. The Sub-Committee claimed the right to compel ERU members to give evidence, under the Committees of the Houses of the Oireachtas (Compellability, Privileges and Immunities of Witnesses) Act, 1997. The ERU members sought judicial review that the subcommittee would be acting ultra vires in compelling them to attend and then issuing a report that criticised them. On 11 March 2002, the Supreme Court agreed, by six votes to one.

The Oireachtas instead established a Tribunal of Inquiry, called the Barr Tribunal after its sole member, Robert Barr. This tribunal sat in public for 208 days between 7 January 2003 and 7 December 2004. Its 744-page report was issued on 20 July 2006. Its total cost was almost €18 million.

From November 2010 to January 2011, the Oireachtas Joint Committee on the Constitution reviewed the Parliamentary Power of Inquiry under Article 15. Its January 2011 report recommended a Constitutional amendment, to be followed by enabling legislation and a protocol under the standing orders of each House. Oireachtas inquiries would "avoid great expense and interminable delay" of tribunals of inquiry, and could make findings of wrongdoing but not impose sanctions. The wording the Joint Committee proposed for Article 15 was:

- The Houses of the Oireachtas shall have the power to inquire into any matter of general public importance.
- In the course of such inquiry the Houses may investigate any individual and make findings in relation to their conduct.
- The conduct of such inquiries shall be regulated by law. Such law shall balance the rights of the individual with the public interest in the effective investigation of matters of general public importance.

In their manifestos for the 2011 general election, both Fine Gael and Labour promised an amendment to overturn the 2002 Abbeylara verdict. The programme of the coalition they formed after the election committed to holding referendums "on a priority basis" on five subjects, including "the granting of full investigative powers for Oireachtas committees". Opposition parties were consulted about the wording of the proposed amendment.

== Proposed change to the text ==
The amendment proposed to insert the following subsections highlighted in bold to Article 15.10:

1° Each House shall make its own rules and standing orders, with power to attach penalties for their infringement, and shall have power to ensure freedom of debate, to protect its official documents and the private papers of its members, and to protect itself and its members against any person or persons interfering with, molesting or attempting to corrupt its members in the exercise of their duties.

2° Each House shall have the power to conduct an inquiry, or an inquiry with the other House, in a manner provided for by law, into any matter stated by the House or Houses concerned to be of general public importance.

3° In the course of any such inquiry the conduct of any person (whether or not a member of either House) may be investigated and the House or Houses concerned may make findings in respect of the conduct of that person concerning the matter to which the inquiry relates.

4° It shall be for the House or Houses concerned to determine, with due regard to the principles of fair procedures, the appropriate balance between the rights of persons and the public interest for the purposes of ensuring an effective inquiry into any matter to which subsection 2° applies.

== Process ==
The amendment bill was published on 12 September 2011. It was introduced in Dáil Éireann on 15 September 2011 by the Minister for Public Expenditure and Reform, Brendan Howlin, and passed final stages in the Dáil on 20 September by 102 votes to 10. It passed all stages in Seanad Éireann on 21 September. All proposed constitutional amendments are required to be put to a popular referendum before becoming law. The referendum was held on 27 October 2011, on the same day as the 2011 presidential election and a referendum on another proposed constitutional amendment, relating to judges' pay.

A referendum commission was established, under the terms of the Referendum Act 1998, to provide voters with non-partisan information about the proposal. The commission was chaired by Bryan McMahon, a former judge of the High Court. On 11 October, the commission launched a media information campaign and began distributing an information booklet to households in the state.

The Oireachtas Joint Committee on Investigations, Oversight and Petitions was established in July 2011 based on Dáil and Seanad resolutions passed the previous month. Its initial orders of reference did not allude to Oireachtas investigations, but in September the government published the heads of the Oireachtas (Powers of Inquiry) Bill, 2011; if the referendum had been passed, the latter bill would then also have been passed to regulate the conduct of Oireachtas inquiries held under the terms of the amended Constitution, giving a leading role to the Joint Committee.

== Campaign ==
The Irish Examiner suggested the amendment would increase the ability of the Oireachtas to investigate the 2008–2011 Irish banking crisis. Stephen Collins raised the possibility of the Fine Gael–Labour government using an Oireachtas inquiry as a witch-hunt to heap blame on its Fianna Fáil predecessor.

The Irish Times commented that coverage of the presidential election limited public debate on the two referendums being held the same day; it stated "Because [the Thirtieth Amendment] proposes to give the Oireachtas far more power than it has ever previously enjoyed, it therefore needs careful consideration by the electorate before it decides". Stephen Collins criticised the speed with which the Bill was rushed through both Houses, while describing some lawyers' criticisms of it as "laughable". Collins called the cost of tribunals of inquiry "scandalous" but pointed out that the Nyberg and Cloyne reports were delivered under the pre-existing Commissions of Investigation Act 2004. Tánaiste Eamon Gilmore suggested much of the opposition to the amendment came from "particular sections of the legal profession who have done very well financially from the judicial tribunals in the past".

In the Irish Independent, Dearbhail McDonald said she would vote no, saying 'it will be up to politicians, vulnerable to swings in public mood and media pressure ... to decide what "balance" of rights witnesses are entitled to'. She cited the example of Senator Ivor Callely's successful appeal to the High Court to overturn a Seanad vote of censure, suggesting such redress might be unavailable if the referendum were passed. Minister Brendan Howlin said that advice from the Attorney General is "crystal clear" that the courts will retain judicial review over the way the Oireachtas balances rights. David Gwynn Morgan concurs, while Vincent Browne expressed scepticism.

Groups supporting the amendment included the government Fine Gael and Labour parties and the opposition Fianna Fáil and Sinn Féin parties. Groups opposing included the United Left Alliance, 12 independent TDs and senators, the Bar Council and Law Society, and the Irish Council for Civil Liberties (ICCL). While Fianna Fáil supported the amendment, its spokesperson on health, Billy Kelleher, intended to vote against it, and former minister Mary O'Rourke described it as "pointless". On 23 October, eight former Attorneys General signed a letter opposing the amendment. The ICCL saw the amendment wording passed by the Houses in September as inferior to that agreed by the Committee in January.

The National Union of Journalists wrote to the Referendum Commission of members' concerns that press freedom and reporters' privilege might be impaired.

=== Opinion polls ===
Date	Poller	Commissioned by	Yes	No	Undecided/ Abstain	Ref
8 October	Ipsos MRBI	The Irish Times	65	8	27 (Note: 4% abstain, 23% undecided)	
23 October	Behaviour & Attitudes	The Sunday Times	76	18	6	
25 October	Ipsos MRBI	The Irish Times	57	20	23	

== Result ==
About 5,000 people fewer voted in the referendum than in the presidential election held simultaneously with the same electorate. Counting began on 29 October, after counting in the presidential election was completed. The result was announced at Dublin Castle that evening:

Thirtieth Amendment of the Constitution Bill 2011
Choice	Votes	%
For	812,008	46.66
Against	928,175	53.34
Total	1,740,183	100.00
Valid votes	1,740,183	97.48
Invalid/blank votes	45,025	2.52
Total votes	1,785,208	100.00
Registered voters/turnout	3,191,157	55.94

Votes were counted separately in each Dáil constituency and sent to the returning officer in Dublin Castle.

Results by constituency
Constituency	Electorate	Turnout (%)	Votes		Proportion of votes	
Constituency	Electorate	Turnout (%)	Yes	No	Yes	No
Carlow–Kilkenny	106,810	55.5%	28,339	29,113	49.3%	50.7%
Cavan–Monaghan	98,952	59.0%	27,542	28,789	48.9%	51.1%
Clare	81,419	57.9%	22,273	23,422	48.7%	51.3%
Cork East	82,731	54.8%	20,966	23,141	47.5%	52.5%
Cork North-Central	75,622	54.9%	18,830	21,780	46.4%	53.6%
Cork North-West	62,113	60.6%	17,232	19,287	47.2%	52.8%
Cork South-Central	91,716	58.4%	23,459	29,028	44.7%	55.3%
Cork South-West	60,248	59.4%	16,924	17,798	48.7%	51.3%
Donegal North-East	58,579	48.6%	11,253	16,330	40.8%	59.2%
Donegal South-West	64,158	48.2%	12,569	17,268	42.1%	57.9%
Dublin Central	54,500	51.6%	12,818	14,808	46.4%	53.6%
Dublin Mid-West	64,370	52.9%	15,942	17,623	47.5%	52.5%
Dublin North	69,347	57.2%	18,294	20,788	46.8%	53.2%
Dublin North-Central	51,929	63.8%	14,226	18,416	43.6%	56.4%
Dublin North-East	57,627	59.7%	15,404	18,435	45.5%	54.5%
Dublin North-West	50,410	50.2%	11,819	12,967	47.7%	52.3%
Dublin South	104,145	61.8%	27,758	35,744	43.7%	56.3%
Dublin South-Central	77,688	53.3%	18,420	22,142	45.4%	54.6%
Dublin South-East	55,533	55.1%	11,177	18,912	37.2%	62.8%
Dublin South-West	69,977	52.3%	17,432	18,541	48.5%	51.5%
Dublin West	61,583	58.9%	16,322	19,467	45.6%	54.4%
Dún Laoghaire	82,033	59.8%	20,094	28,151	41.7%	58.3%
Galway East	81,896	57.3%	22,003	23,207	48.7%	51.3%
Galway West	94,700	53.3%	22,529	26,442	46.0%	54.0%
Kerry North–West Limerick	63,068	54.6%	15,892	17,338	47.8%	52.2%
Kerry South	57,776	55.1%	14,495	16,171	47.3%	52.7%
Kildare North	76,623	56.7%	19,389	23,284	45.4%	54.6%
Kildare South	57,933	53.9%	14,940	15,567	49.0%	51.0%
Laois–Offaly	107,023	55.3%	27,149	30,324	47.2%	52.8%
Limerick	66,421	52.1%	16,820	16,942	49.8%	50.2%
Limerick City	66,345	55.4%	17,166	18,413	48.3%	51.7%
Longford–Westmeath	85,911	52.8%	20,304	23,711	46.1%	53.9%
Louth	102,941	56.3%	27,089	29,583	47.8%	52.2%
Mayo	97,714	54.8%	26,091	25,658	50.4%	49.6%
Meath East	65,477	54.0%	16,453	18,158	47.5%	52.5%
Meath West	63,111	52.2%	15,021	17,123	46.7%	53.3%
Roscommon–South Leitrim	60,416	60.1%	15,547	19,565	44.3%	55.7%
Sligo–North Leitrim	62,152	55.0%	15,353	17,818	46.3%	53.7%
Tipperary North	62,603	61.1%	17,276	19,653	46.8%	53.2%
Tipperary South	56,295	57.8%	15,316	16,195	48.6%	51.4%
Waterford	78,960	54.1%	20,010	21,549	48.2%	51.8%
Wexford	108,490	53.9%	28,517	28,397	50.1%	49.9%
Wicklow	93,812	61.6%	25,555	31,127	45.1%	54.9%
Total	3,191,157	55.9%	812,008	928,175	46.7%	53.3%

== Aftermath ==
=== Causes ===
Politicians and journalists suggested several factors contributed to the defeat of the referendum.

Harry McGee in The Irish Times, and Seán Fleming, the Fianna Fáil spokesperson on Public Expenditure and Reform, mentioned the rushed nature of the legislative process. After its formation in February, the government had a long list of proposed amendments; the Oireachtas inquiries was not brought to the head of the list till the summer recess, and then rushed through in the autumn.

Holding two referendums and the presidential election simultaneously reduced media time for debate; some underinformed voters adopted a policy of "if you don't know vote no".

The precise wording of the amendment was considered vague by many; Harry McGee mentioned that the Referendum Commission's information booklet drew attention to this. Brendan Howlin, the sponsoring minister, suggested in The Sunday Times that the Referendum Commission's briefing had caused confusion. The Commission publicly objected to what it saw as a criticism of its impartiality and of its chairman personally. Howlin apologised and described his original comments as "cack-handed". Law lecturer Donncha O'Connell characterised the Referendum Commission's advertising campaign as "facile and patronising". In April 2012, The Irish Times reported that an unpublished briefing produced by the Commission for minister Phil Hogan described as "grossly inadequate" the five weeks it had had to fulfil its functions.

The electorate retained a distrust of politicians previously evident in the general election in February 2011; journalists suggested voters did not trust politicians to wield quasi-judicial power.

Seán Fleming criticised the government's perceived arrogance during the campaign. Journalists mentioned in particular Alan Shatter's dismissive response to the Attorney Generals' voicing of opposition. Joan Burton's regret for a Prime Time debate between Howlin and Michael McDowell was seen by Mary Regan of the Irish Examiner as a veiled critique of her Labour-Party cabinet colleague.

=== Consequences ===
The government's statement after the result was:

It is disappointing that the 30th amendment has been narrowly defeated but the Constitution is something that belongs to the people and we acknowledge and accept the people's democratic decision. We will reflect and carefully consider the outcome of this referendum.

Brendan Howlin suggested the government's plans for a large number of further Constitutional amendments would be made less ambitious. The constitutional convention planned for 2012 might be delayed to 2014. Much of the work planned for the Oireachtas Committee on Investigations, Oversight and Petitions was predicated on the amendment passing. Eamon Gilmore suggested the planned Oireachtas inquiry into the banking crisis would no longer be able to proceed.

Gilmore suggested the subject might be revisited by a future referendum. Donncha O'Connell suggested that public support was still strong for the principle of Oireachtas inquiries, and that a future retry for a similar amendment should return to the model suggested by the Oireachtas Committee is January 2011.

In December, the Minister Howlin appeared before the Oireachtas Joint Committee on Investigations, Oversight and Petitions to discuss amending its terms of reference in light of the defeat of the referendum. In January 2012, new terms of reference were published for the committee, to be renamed the Joint Committee on Public Service Oversight and Petitions.

The government commissioned a report from three academics on factors influencing the public's vote, and lessons for future referendums. The report was published on 22 February 2012, and discussed at a meeting of the Oireachtas Committee on Investigations, Oversight and Petitions.
