= Fifteenth Amendment of the Constitution of Ireland =

Amendment to remove the constitutional prohibition on divorce

- 24 November 1995
- To remove the constitutional prohibition on divorce

Results
| Choice | Votes | % |
|---|---|---|
| Yes | 818,842 | 50.28% |
| No | 809,728 | 49.72% |
| Valid votes | 1,628,570 | 99.67% |
| Invalid or blank votes | 5,372 | 0.33% |
| Total votes | 1,633,942 | 100.00% |
| Registered voters/turnout | 2,628,834 | 62.15% |
- Results by Dáil constituency

The Fifteenth Amendment of the Constitution Act 1995 (previously bill no. 15 of 1995) is an amendment of the Constitution of Ireland which removed the constitutional prohibition on divorce, and allowed for the dissolution of a marriage provided specified conditions were satisfied. It was approved by referendum on 24 November 1995 and signed into law on 17 June 1996.

== Background ==
In pre-independence Ireland, divorce was only possible via the passage of a private act by Parliament; it was only available in case of adultery, and if a woman was applying, divorce was only granted if the adultery was accompanied by life-threatening cruelty. This was an expensive process, so only the very wealthy were able to get such Acts passed. Most of Ireland achieved independence in 1922 as the Irish Free State. Per the 1926 Census, 93% of the population were Catholics, and the Catholic Church forbade its members from divorce.

In 1925, the Oireachtas (Irish parliament) altered its Standing Orders to say that divorce bills would not be heard, and thus it would be impossible to get a divorce. This was strenuously opposed by Senator W. B. Yeats, who said "If you show that this country, Southern Ireland, is going to be governed by Catholic ideas and by Catholic ideas alone, you will never get the North. You will create an impassable barrier between South and North, and you will pass more and more Catholic laws, while the North will, gradually, assimilate its divorce and other laws to those of England."

The Constitution of Ireland adopted in 1937 included a ban on divorce. An attempt by the Fine Gael–Labour Party government in 1986 to amend this provision was rejected in a referendum by 63.5% to 36.5%.

The Judicial Separation and Family Law Reform Act 1989 allowed Irish courts to recognize legal separation. The government made other legislative changes to address the issues identified in that referendum campaign, including the social welfare and pension rights of divorced spouses, which were copper fastened, and the abolition of the status of illegitimacy to remove any distinction between the rights of the children of first and subsequent unions.

Shortly before its collapse, the 1989–1992 government published a white paper on marriage breakdown, which proposed "to have a referendum on divorce after a full debate on the complex issues involved and following the enactment of other legislative proposals in the area of family law".

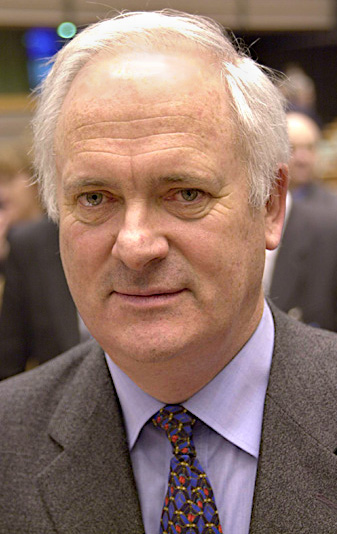
Taoiseach John Bruton, who led the coalition that proposed the amendment and referendum

In 1995, the Fine Gael–Labour Party–Democratic Left government of John Bruton proposed a new amendment to allow for divorce in specified circumstances.

== Changes to the text ==
The Fifteenth Amendment deleted the following Article 41.3.2° of the Constitution:

2° No law shall be enacted providing for the grant of a dissolution of marriage.

and substituted that subsection with the following:

2° A Court designated by law may grant a dissolution of marriage where, but only where, it is satisfied that –

i. at the date of the institution of the proceedings, the spouses have lived apart from one another for a period of, or periods amounting to, at least four years during the previous five years,
ii. there is no reasonable prospect of a reconciliation between the spouses,
iii. such provision as the Court considers proper having regard to the circumstances exists or will be made for the spouses, any children of either or both of them and any other person prescribed by law, and
iv. any further conditions prescribed by law are complied with.

== Oireachtas Debate ==
The Fifteenth Amendment of the Constitution (No. 2) Bill 1995 was proposed in the Dáil on 27 October 1995 by Minister for Equality and Law Reform Mervyn Taylor. An amendment was proposed by Helen Keogh on behalf of the Progressive Democrats which would have allowed for legislation generally, without the restrictions proposed in the government's proposal:

2° Notwithstanding any other provision of this Constitution, a Court designated by law may grant a dissolution of marriage where it is satisfied that all the conditions prescribed by law are complied with.

This amendment was rejected and the Bill passed final stages by the Dáil without division on 11 October. It was passed by the Seanad on 18 October and proceed to a referendum on 24 November 1995.

== Campaign ==
The Catholic Church was strongly against the amendment, but stated that Catholics could vote for the amendment in good conscience, and that it would not be a sin to do so.

In the run-up to the vote the No Campaign used the now-infamous slogan "Hello Divorce, Bye Bye Daddy" which was criticised for being manipulative and irresponsible.

Justin Barrett was the spokesman for the Youth Against Divorce campaign. In later years, Barrett himself sought a divorce in 2016.

=== Opinion polling ===
| Last date of polling | Commissioner | Polling firm | Sources | | | Undecided |
|---|---|---|---|---|---|---|
| 24 November | Referendum results | — | | 50.3% | 49.7% | — |
| 24 November | The Irish Times | MRBI | | 45% | 43% | 12% |
| 18 November | The Irish Times | MRBI | | 45% | 42% | 13% |
| 13 November | Government of Ireland | MRBI | | 46% | 41% | 13% |
| 4 November | The Irish Times | MRBI | | 52% | 35% | 13% |
| 20 October | Government of Ireland | MRBI | | 58% | 30% | 12% |
| 30 September | The Irish Times | MRBI | | 61% | 30% | 9% |
| 27 July | The Irish Times | MRBI | | 66% | 26% | 9% |
| 22 May | The Irish Times | MRBI | | 69% | 27% | 4% |
| 11 March | Government of Ireland | MRBI | | 57% | 34% | 9% |
| 13 February | The Irish Times | MRBI | | 59% | 35% | 6% |

== Result ==
Fifteenth Amendment of the Constitution of Ireland referendum
| Choice | Votes | % |
|---|---|---|
| For | 818,842 | 50.28 |
| Against | 809,728 | 49.72 |
| Total | 1,628,570 | 100.00 |
| Valid votes | 1,628,570 | 99.67 |
| Invalid/blank votes | 5,372 | 0.33 |
| Total votes | 1,633,942 | 100.00 |
| Registered voters/turnout | 2,628,834 | 62.15 |

Referendum results (excluding invalid votes)
| Yes; 818,842 (50.3%) | No; 809,728 (49.7%) |
▲50%

Results by constituency
| Constituency | Electorate | Turnout (%) | Votes | | Proportion of votes | | ± Yes 1986 |
| Constituency | Electorate | Turnout (%) | Yes | No | Yes | No | ± Yes 1986 |
|---|---|---|---|---|---|---|---|
| Carlow–Kilkenny | 84,365 | 64.2% | 24,651 | 29,283 | 45.7% | 54.3% | +13.9% |
| Cavan–Monaghan | 80,970 | 59.1% | 17,817 | 29,787 | 37.4% | 62.6% | +10.0% |
| Clare | 67,829 | 59.4% | 17,576 | 22,577 | 43.8% | 56.2% | +12.2% |
| Cork East | 60,995 | 65.8% | 17,287 | 22,748 | 43.2% | 56.8% | +13.7% |
| Cork North-Central | 69,936 | 61.9% | 20,110 | 23,050 | 46.6% | 53.4% | +16.1% |
| Cork North-West | 45,938 | 67.0% | 10,409 | 20,264 | 33.9% | 66.1% | +13.0% |
| Cork South-Central | 79,270 | 68.0% | 28,433 | 25,360 | 52.9% | 47.1% | +15.3% |
| Cork South-West | 46,046 | 64.9% | 11,755 | 18,034 | 39.5% | 60.5% | +12.6% |
| Donegal North-East | 49,473 | 51.9% | 10,401 | 15,219 | 40.6% | 59.4% | +14.0% |
| Donegal South-West | 50,208 | 51.1% | 10,450 | 15,109 | 40.9% | 59.1% | +10.7% |
| Dublin Central | 59,215 | 57.3% | 19,378 | 14,474 | 57.2% | 42.8% | +18.1% |
| Dublin North | 68,512 | 66.5% | 29,704 | 15,756 | 65.3% | 34.7% | +14.7% |
| Dublin North-Central | 64,070 | 69.0% | 25,721 | 18,415 | 58.3% | 41.7% | +14.3% |
| Dublin North-East | 58,595 | 66.9% | 25,360 | 13,714 | 64.9% | 35.1% | +13.9% |
| Dublin North-West | 56,469 | 63.2% | 21,628 | 13,942 | 60.8% | 39.2% | +13.2% |
| Dublin South | 87,565 | 70.0% | 39,454 | 21,723 | 64.5% | 35.5% | +10.1% |
| Dublin South-Central | 60,825 | 64.3% | 22,839 | 16,131 | 58.6% | 41.4% | +13.1% |
| Dublin South-East | 63,830 | 60.3% | 24,901 | 13,493 | 64.9% | 35.1% | +11.1% |
| Dublin South-West | 73,109 | 61.0% | 29,767 | 14,769 | 66.8% | 33.2% | +13.3% |
| Dublin West | 63,487 | 62.4% | 25,811 | 13,697 | 65.3% | 34.7% | +16.5% |
| Dún Laoghaire | 89,160 | 67.6% | 41,028 | 19,121 | 68.2% | 31.8% | +9.4% |
| Galway East | 43,768 | 59.0% | 9,003 | 16,730 | 35.0% | 65.0% | +11.8% |
| Galway West | 83,513 | 56.8% | 22,977 | 24,261 | 48.6% | 51.4% | +11.7% |
| Kerry North | 49,762 | 58.5% | 11,848 | 17,131 | 40.9% | 59.1% | +13.9% |
| Kerry South | 45,849 | 58.4% | 10,203 | 16,456 | 38.3% | 61.7% | +14.2% |
| Kildare | 82,825 | 61.7% | 29,397 | 21,592 | 57.7% | 42.3% | +12.7% |
| Laois–Offaly | 81,078 | 63.0% | 20,426 | 30,467 | 40.1% | 59.9% | +13.5% |
| Limerick East | 73,956 | 62.9% | 23,184 | 23,140 | 50.0% | 50.0% | +14.9% |
| Limerick West | 46,069 | 62.7% | 10,617 | 18,159 | 36.9% | 63.1% | +12.0% |
| Longford–Roscommon | 61,920 | 61.3% | 13,333 | 24,477 | 35.3% | 64.7% | |
| Louth | 68,809 | 62.0% | 22,004 | 20,516 | 51.7% | 48.3% | +15.9% |
| Mayo East | 44,366 | 56.3% | 9,243 | 15,621 | 37.2% | 62.8% | +12.9% |
| Mayo West | 45,745 | 55.3% | 10,455 | 14,764 | 41.5% | 58.5% | +15.1% |
| Meath | 83,655 | 59.6% | 23,790 | 25,861 | 47.9% | 52.1% | +16.2% |
| Sligo–Leitrim | 62,116 | 59.0% | 15,034 | 21,490 | 41.2% | 58.8% | +11.7% |
| Tipperary North | 43,958 | 65.6% | 11,020 | 17,699 | 38.4% | 61.6% | +12.8% |
| Tipperary South | 58,502 | 64.1% | 15,798 | 21,557 | 42.3% | 57.7% | +15.1% |
| Waterford | 66,132 | 62.0% | 20,305 | 20,508 | 49.8% | 50.2% | +16.7% |
| Westmeath | 46,900 | 60.1% | 11,704 | 16,353 | 41.7% | 58.3% | |
| Wexford | 79,445 | 62.1% | 23,850 | 25,305 | 48.5% | 51.5% | +17.8% |
| Wicklow | 80,599 | 63.7% | 30,171 | 20,975 | 59.0% | 41.0% | +12.1% |
| Total | 2,628,834 | 62.2% | 818,842 | 809,728 | 50.3% | 49.7% | +13.8% |

The '± Yes 1986' column shows the percentage point change in the Yes vote compared to the Tenth Amendment of the Constitution Bill on a similar proposal rejected in a referendum in 1986.

== Court challenge ==
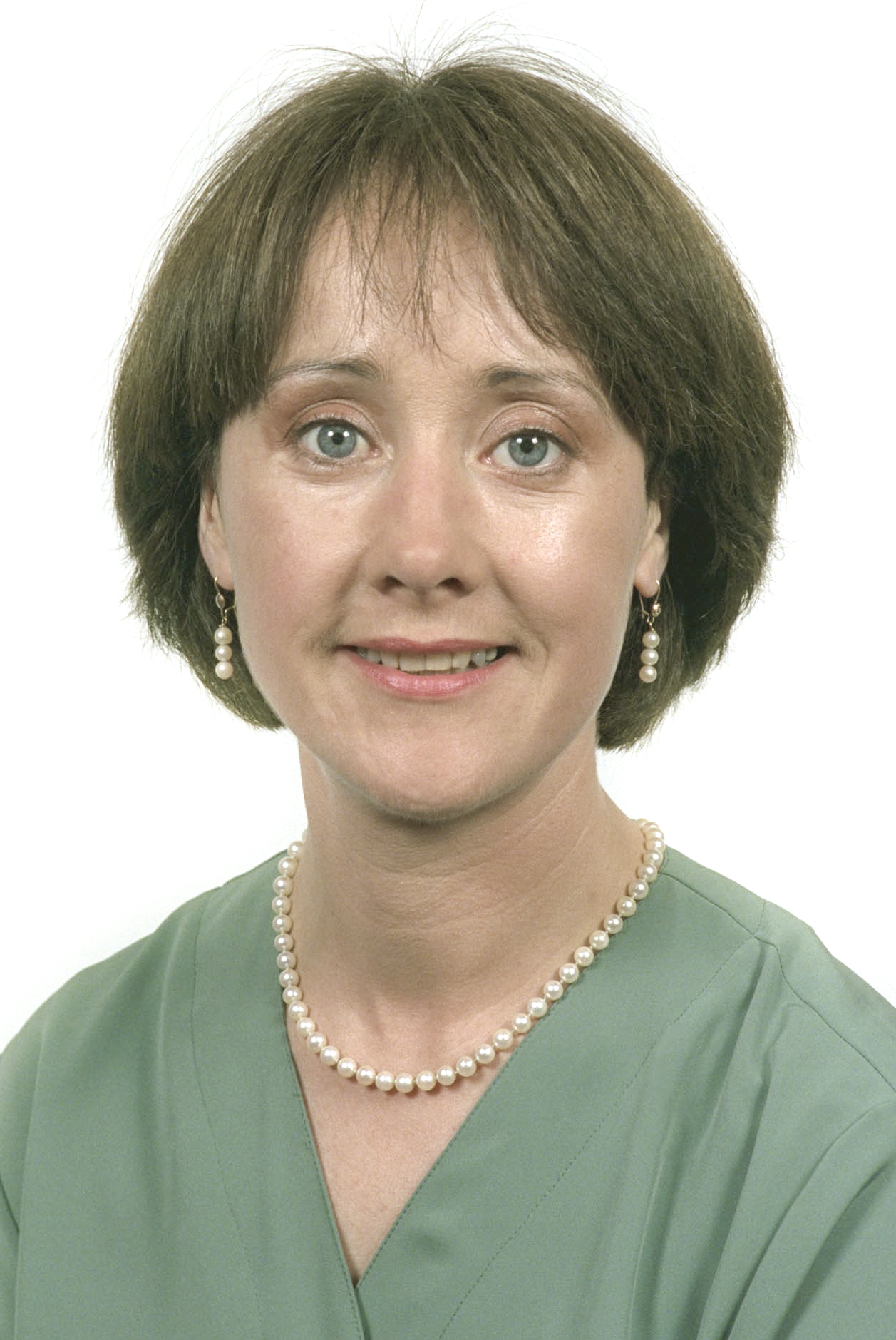
Green Party MEP Patricia McKenna who successfully lodged a complaint against the government with the Supreme Court regarding the referendum

During the referendum, government funds were used to advertise in favour of a 'Yes' vote. One week before the referendum, Patricia McKenna, a Green Party MEP, successfully lodged a complaint against the government with the Supreme Court, and the advertising stopped. This Supreme Court decision led to legislation that would establish a Referendum Commission for each referendum, commencing with the Eighteenth Amendment in 1998.

The returning officer submitted a provisional certificate of the result of the referendum in the High Court as required by the Referendum Act 1994.

According to The Irish Times, "the polls taken at the time showed that, if anything, the end of the advertising campaign coincided with a halt in the slide of support for divorce". Because of the use of Government funds for one side of the campaign, a petition against the result was lodged by Des Hanafin, a Fianna Fáil Senator and chairman of the Pro Life Campaign, which was dismissed by the High Court on 9 February 1996. Hanafin appealed to the Supreme Court, which in June upheld the High Court decision. The High Court then endorsed the provisional certificate on 14 June 1996. President Mary Robinson signed the amendment bill into law three days later.

== Subsequent legislation ==
Before the referendum, a draft Family Law (Divorce) Bill was published to illustrate how the Constitutional provisions would be implemented if the amendment were passed. Once the Constitutional amendment came into force, the divorce bill was introduced in the Oireachtas on 27 June 1996 and signed into law on 27 November 1996. This gave effect in primary legislation to the new Constitutional provisions. Although this act, the Family Law (Divorce) Act, 1996, specified its own commencement date as 27 February 1997, the first divorce was granted on 17 January 1997, based solely on the constitutional amendment, to a dying man who wanted urgently to marry his new partner.

The Thirty-eighth Amendment of the Constitution of Ireland was approved in a referendum held in May 2019, and removed the constitutional requirement for parties to be living apart before a divorce. It also altered the provisions in Article 41.3.3° on the recognition of foreign divorce.
