= Irish Council for Civil Liberties =

- Formation: 30 June 1976; 49 years ago
- Founder: Kader Asmal; Mary Robinson
- Type: NGO
- Headquarters: Dublin, Ireland
- Chairperson: Colette Kelleher
- Executive director: Joe O'Brien
- Website: www.iccl.ie

The Irish Council for Civil Liberties (Irish: An Chomhairle um Chearta Daonna) is an Irish non-profit organisation dedicated to supporting the civil liberties and human rights of people in Ireland.

== History ==
Founded on 30 June 1976 by future President Mary Robinson, Kader Asmal and others, the organisation's primary role is in campaigning for civil rights. It also networks with other civil rights groups nationally and internationally.

During the divorce campaign of the 1980s and 1990s, the ICCL was among others who established the Divorce Action Group which campaigned to support the legalisation of divorce which had previously been prohibited in the Constitution. In 1995, this was successfully passed by referendum.

The ICCL are a member organisation of the International Federation of Human Rights (FIDH).

The ICCL has repeatedly sought the abolition of the Special Criminal Court, and in 2009 opposed its expansion from a narrow focus on state security-related trials to also include organised crime.

In October 2011, the ICCL said the information provided to voters in advance of polling in two constitutional referendums on the Twenty-ninth Amendment and Thirtieth Amendment was "tardy and inadequate". and advocated a 'no' vote on the proposed Thirtieth Amendment. The Thirtieth Amendment was subsequently rejected by more than 100,000 votes.

In January 2020, the ICCL criticised management at CBS Kilkenny for attempting to implement facial recognition technology to record and process the biometric data of children and staff in the school. The implementation was postponed as a result.

== Freedom of speech ==
In 2023, the ICCL expressed support for the curbing of hate speech in Ireland, but called for definitions of "hate" and "incitement", to that legislation would be focused on "only the most extreme forms of hate speech", so as not to place undue limitations on freedom of expression. The ICCL also called for the freedom of expression defence in the legislation to be strengthened, referring to the precedence set by European courts which stresses that while content may be shocking or offensive, it may not be "hateful".

== See also ==
- Amnesty International
- LGBT rights in the Republic of Ireland
