= Thirty-seventh Amendment of the Constitution of Ireland =

2018 amendment decriminalising blasphemy

Thirty-seventh Amendment of the Constitution
- 26 October 2018
- Repeal of offence of publication or utterance of blasphemous matter

Results
Choice	Votes	%
Yes	951,650	64.85%
No	515,808	35.15%
Valid votes	1,467,458	98.51%
Invalid or blank votes	22,236	1.49%
Total votes	1,489,694	100.00%
Registered voters/turnout	3,401,652	43.79%
- Results by county

The Thirty-seventh Amendment of the Constitution is an amendment to the constitution of Ireland which removed the constitution's requirement to criminalise "publication or utterance of blasphemous matter". The amendment was effected by an act of the Oireachtas — the Thirty-seventh Amendment of the Constitution (Repeal of offence of publication or utterance of blasphemous matter) Act 2018, which was introduced (as bill no. 87 of 2018) in Dáil Éireann, passed by the Dáil and Seanad, approved by the people in a referendum, before it was signed into law by the president.

The bill was introduced to the Oireachtas on 13 July 2018 by the Fine Gael minority coalition government. A referendum was held on 26 October, on the same date as the presidential election. A second referendum on whether to remove an article referring to women's place in the home, originally scheduled for the same date, was postponed, taking place on 8 March 2024.

The amendment was approved by nearly 65% of the voters, and by a majority in every Dáil constituency. It was signed into law by the president on 27 November 2018. It was followed by separate legislation in 2019 to remove the crime of blasphemy from the statute book.

== Background ==
The publication or utterance of blasphemous matter is an offence specified by the Constitution of Ireland as an exception to general guarantee of the right of the citizens to express freely their convictions and opinions. In Corway v Independent Newspapers (1999), the Supreme Court held that the common law crime of blasphemous libel related to an established church and could not have survived the enactment of the Constitution. They also held that it was impossible to say what the offence of blasphemy consisted of.

The offence of publishing or uttering blasphemous matter was first defined in Irish law in the Defamation Act 2009. Someone is guilty of the offence if they publish or utter "matter that is grossly abusive or insulting in relation to matters held sacred by any religion, thereby causing outrage among a substantial number of the adherents of that religion", and they intend, "by the publication or utterance of the matter concerned, to cause such outrage". There is a broad defence where "a reasonable person would find genuine literary, artistic, political, scientific, or academic value in the matter to which the offence relates". To date, there has not been a public prosecution for the offence of blasphemy in the Irish state.

The Constitutional Convention held a session in November 2013, where they proposed replacing the offence of blasphemy in the Constitution with a prohibition on the incitement of religious hatred.

The matter came to public attention, in May 2017, when it was announced that English comedian Stephen Fry, along with broadcaster RTÉ, were under criminal investigation for blasphemy under the Act, following a complaint from a member of the public about comments made by Fry in a 2015 broadcast interviewed with veteran Irish broadcaster Gay Byrne. The case was dropped after Gardaí confirmed that they had not been able to locate a sufficient number of offended people.

In June 2018, Minister for Justice and Equality Charles Flanagan announced that the government would hold a referendum to simply remove the reference to the offence of blasphemy from the Constitution.

== Changes to the text ==
The Thirty-seventh Amendment amended the final sentence of paragraph i of subsection 1° of Article 40.6 by substituting "seditious" for "blasphemous, seditious,". The original text read:

The publication or utterance of blasphemous, seditious, or indecent matter is an offence which shall be punishable in accordance with law.

The text as amended reads:

The publication or utterance of seditious or indecent matter is an offence which shall be punishable in accordance with law.

== Subsequent legislation ==
The Department of Justice and Equality's draft general scheme for subsequent legislation proposed that the Government introduce a formal Bill to repeal sections 36 and 37 of the Defamation Act 2009, which dealt with the 'Publication or utterance of blasphemous matter' and the 'Seizure of copies of blasphemous statements' respectively, as well as to replace the words "indecent, obscene, or blasphemous" by "indecent or obscene" in the Censorship of Films Act 1923 as amended by the Civil Law (Miscellaneous Provisions) Act 2008, and in the Censorship of Films (Amendment) Act 1925. The Blasphemy (Abolition of Offences and Related Matters) Act 2019, enacted on 17 January 2020, removed these offences from statute law.

== Passage through the Oireachtas ==
The Bill was proposed by Minister Charlie Flanagan and passed all stage in the Dáil on 18 September and all stages of the Seanad on 20 September. Amendments by Solidarity to remove other religious references from the Constitution were ruled out of order. It was opposed in the Seanad by Rónán Mullen.

== Campaign ==
A Referendum Commission to provide information to the public on the proposed amendment was established on 18 July 2018. Minister for Housing, Planning and Local Government Eoghan Murphy signed the electoral order for the referendum on 21 September, setting the polling date as 26 October.

By 17 October, there had been little public debate about the referendum, leading The Irish Times to suggest that this might cause most "Don't know" voters to end up voting "No" as had happened before in similar little-debated referendums, although it still expected the referendum to be carried based on the most recent opinion poll of 12 October.

=== For ===
Those who supported removing blasphemy from the constitution included:

- Fine Gael
- Fianna Fáil
- Sinn Féin
- Labour Party
- Green Party
- People Before Profit
- Social Democrats
- Irish Council for Civil Liberties
- Church of Ireland
- Atheist Ireland
- Justice Minister Charles Flanagan
- Senator Ivana Bacik
- Michael Nugent of Atheist Ireland

=== Not opposed ===
- Irish Catholic Bishops' Conference, who called the provision "obsolete" and said that similar laws have been used to justify violence and oppression against minorities in other parts of the world.

=== Against ===
Those who opposed removing blasphemy from the constitution included:

- Islamic Cultural Centre of Ireland
- Senator Rónán Mullen
- Séamas de Barra of Alliance for the Defence of Marriage and the Family
- Colum Kenny of DCU School of Communications

== Opinion and exit polling ==
Last date of polling	Polling firm / Commissioner	Sample size	Yes	No	Undecided	Lead
17 September 2018	Amárach/Claire Byrne Live poll for TheJournal.ie	over 1,000	54%	17%	29%	37%
12 October 2018	Ipsos MBRI/The Irish Times	1,200	51%	19%	25% (Note: An additional 4% stated that they will not vote, hence, does not add to 100%.)	32%
Exit polls
26 October 2018	Ipsos MBRI/The Irish Times	4,365	69%	31%	—	38%
26 October 2018	Red C/RTÉ News	3,474	71.1%	26.3%	—	44.8% (Note: 1.8% saying they had not voted on the blasphemy referendum and 0.8% said they did not know or refused to indicate which way they voted.)

== Voting ==
The referendum took place on 26 October 2018, on the same day as the presidential election. Polling stations were open from 7 am until 10 pm. Turnout was reported to be low in many areas of the country. By midday, turnout percentages from around the country were in the low teens, with many polling stations reporting single figure percentages. In Dublin some estimates suggested that turnout would be half that of the referendum on the Thirty-sixth Amendment of the Constitution of Ireland in May.

Thirty-seventh Amendment of the Constitution Bill 2018
Choice	Votes	%
For	951,650	64.85
Against	515,808	35.15
Total	1,467,458	100.00
Valid votes	1,467,458	98.51
Invalid/blank votes	22,236	1.49
Total votes	1,489,694	100.00
Registered voters/turnout	3,401,652	43.79

Results by constituency
Constituency	Electorate	Turnout (%)	Votes		Proportion of votes	
Constituency	Electorate	Turnout (%)	Yes	No	Yes	No
Carlow–Kilkenny	108,863	45.90%	30,438	18,699	61.95%	38.05%
Cavan–Monaghan	91,692	41.77%	21,045	16,462	56.11%	43.89%
Clare	83,044	50.31%	25,386	15,635	61.89%	38.11%
Cork East	86,180	44.53%	23,751	14,046	62.84%	37.16%
Cork North-Central	84,919	41.55%	22,379	12,452	64.25%	35.75%
Cork North-West	68,820	50.14%	20,086	13,708	59.44%	40.56%
Cork South-Central	88,074	45.87%	27,381	12,588	68.51%	31.49%
Cork South-West	63,897	48.33%	18,800	11,404	62.24%	37.76%
Donegal	119,318	33.68%	20,312	19,108	51.53%	48.47%
Dublin Bay North	114,597	44.56%	36,649	13,930	72.46%	27.54%
Dublin Bay South	80,146	36.69%	22,329	6,866	76.48%	23.52%
Dublin Central	48,588	31.75%	11,359	3,908	74.40%	25.60%
Dublin Fingal	96,612	44.72%	31,645	11,267	73.74%	26.26%
Dublin Mid-West	72,006	40.75%	20,449	8,632	70.32%	29.68%
Dublin North-West	62,726	37.99%	16,722	6,907	70.77%	29.23%
Dublin Rathdown	65,918	48.44%	23,510	8,182	74.18%	25.82%
Dublin South-Central	73,567	38.12%	20,214	7,562	72.78%	27.22%
Dublin South-West	107,134	42.71%	32,651	12,853	71.75%	28.25%
Dublin West	67,625	42.31%	20,261	8,092	71.46%	28.54%
Dún Laoghaire	96,825	46.88%	33,988	11,095	75.39%	24.61%
Galway East	70,302	48.42%	20,248	12,981	60.93%	39.07%
Galway West	109,523	43.74%	30,917	16,063	65.81%	34.19%
Kerry	111,777	45.12%	28,373	20,873	57.61%	42.39%
Kildare North	86,305	44.13%	27,399	10,284	72.71%	27.29%
Kildare South	63,929	41.06%	17,374	8,510	67.12%	32.88%
Laois	64,139	43.43%	16,314	11,060	59.60%	40.40%
Limerick City	79,647	41.60%	21,702	10,948	66.47%	33.53%
Limerick County	68,740	46.53%	18,450	12,880	58.89%	41.11%
Longford–Westmeath	92,354	41.45%	22,637	15,008	60.13%	39.87%
Louth	110,256	41.28%	29,532	15,451	65.65%	34.35%
Mayo	91,412	45.91%	23,305	17,630	56.93%	43.07%
Meath East	68,591	43.47%	19,671	9,798	66.75%	33.25%
Meath West	66,848	40.61%	16,768	9,988	62.67%	37.33%
Offaly	66,208	45.35%	16,919	12,544	57.42%	42.58%
Roscommon–Galway	64,857	49.20%	17,466	13,709	56.03%	43.97%
Sligo–Leitrim	96,653	43.99%	23,380	18,297	56.10%	43.90%
Tipperary	114,433	48.30%	32,209	21,985	59.43%	40.57%
Waterford	83,359	43.28%	23,517	12,016	66.18%	33.82%
Wexford	111,897	43.92%	31,085	17,315	64.23%	35.77%
Wicklow	99,871	50.68%	35,029	15,072	69.92%	30.08%
Total	3,401,652	43.79%	951,650	515,808	64.85%	35.15%

== Analysis ==
The Irish Times's analysis of its exit poll data said that "younger voters overwhelmingly backed deletion, while older voters were much more evenly split, with 48 per cent voting to retain the constitutional article as it currently stands".

RTÉ noted that given that the presidential election had received far more attention, it had been expected that there would be more abstainers than the 1.8% reported in its exit poll data.

When analysing the Red C/RTÉ exit poll, RTÉ Religious and Social Affairs Correspondent Joe Little said that older voters were less likely to vote Yes, with over 8 out of 10 voting Yes among those aged under 44, 7 out of 10 among those aged under 45 to 64, and 6 out of 10 among those aged over 65. Support for No also increased in the lower socio-economic groups, with 77% of those in the top ABC1 group voting Yes, 70% of the C2DE group, and 63% of the bottom F group. Sinn Féin voters were likeliest to vote Yes, followed by those voting Fine Gael, Independent, Labour, and Fianna Fáil. Women and men were equally likely to vote Yes. 80% voted Yes in County Dublin, slightly over 70% in Munster, and slightly under 70% in the rest of Leinster, and in Connacht and the three border counties of Ulster (Donegal, Cavan, and Monaghan). Only 69% said that "they understood the proposition to abolish the offence in the Constitution" (74% of Yes voters, and 64% of No voters).
