= Kevin Cross (judge) =

Irish barrister, High Court judge since 2011

Judge of the High Court
- In office 24 October 2011 – 18 November 2021
- Nominated by: Government of Ireland
- Appointed by: Mary McAleese

Personal details
- Born: 1951 (age 74–75)
- Spouse: Alison Lindsay
- Education: University College Dublin; King's Inns

Kevin Cross (born 1951) is a retired Irish judge who served as a Judge of the High Court from 2011 to 2021.

== Early life ==
Cross attended Gonzaga College, University College Dublin and the King's Inns. He served as Auditor of the UCD L&H. He became a barrister in 1975, and a senior counsel in 1997. He has represented the Attorney General of Ireland, the Residential Institutions Redress Board and Our Lady's Children's Hospital, Crumlin.

== Judicial career ==
Cross was appointed a High Court judge in October 2011. He was in charge of the personal injuries list for the High Court.

He presided over Morrissey v Health Service Executive, which arose out of the CervicalCheck cancer scandal. He held that screeners must have "absolute confidence" before definitively ruling out a health condition in a screening test. This was subject to an appeal to the Supreme Court of Ireland due to the standard of confidence he applied. The Supreme Court unanimously upheld his decision. Cross criticised the response of some doctors to his decision, calling some commentary "hysterical".

He served as Chairperson of the Referendum Commission for two concurrent referendums in 2015, the successful 34th Amendment and unsuccessful 35th Amendment Bill 2015 to the Constitution.

He retired as a judge in November 2021 and stated he plans to undertake a PhD on John Philpot Curran.

== Personal life ==
He is married to Alison Lindsay. Lindsay is a retired judge of the Circuit Court.
