= Springfield College of Education =

Springfield College of Education was an educational tertiary institution that was located in Asherville in Durban in the early years of Apartheid, to train primary and secondary Indian school teachers. Under the Union of South Africa, teacher training for Indian communities had either taken place at Satri College in the Non-European Section of Natal University College or Durban Girl's High School.

Between 1912 and 1950, state and state aided Indian school institutions increased from 39 to 172. Following World War Two, Indian teachers began to upgrade their academic and professional qualifications. In 1946, The Wilks Commission in Natal had recommended that all Indian children should have to attend school until they were 13 years old. Springfield College of Education was established in 1951.

- 1952 - a two-year post-school qualification was introduced at Springfield. . A Shakespeare production tradition begins at the College.
- 1957 a public company formed by The Natal Indian Teachers Society with teachers as shareholders
- 1961 Salisbury Island in Durban harbour becomes a University College for Indians
- 1964 Control of Indian primary, secondary education and teacher training is transferred to the Department of Indian Affairs.
- 1965 - The Indian Education Act of 1965 (No. 61 of 1965) ushers in a new era for Indian education
- 1967 - a three year course to teach up to standard 8 is introduced at Springfield College .
- 1968- the South African Indian Council (SAIC) was established in terms of the South African Indian Council Act (Act No. 31 of 1968)
- 1969the former University College (on salisbury Island) is elevated to full university status
- 1972The University of Durban-Westville is established.
- 1980 Almost all Indian teachers are recognised as qualified teachers
- 1995 - Desegregation begins at Springfield and African and Indian students begin to integrate
- 1999 - Springfield merges with other colleges of education.

Springfield College's first rector with Indian origin was Dr GK Nair
