= Third Amendment of the Constitution of Ireland =

Amendment on the European Communities

- 10 May 1972
- To permit the state to join the European Communities

Results
Choice	Votes	%
Yes	1,041,890	83.10%
No	211,891	16.90%
Valid votes	1,253,781	99.17%
Invalid or blank votes	10,497	0.83%
Total votes	1,264,278	100.00%
Registered voters/turnout	1,783,604	70.88%

The Third Amendment of the Constitution Act 1972 is an amendment to the Constitution of Ireland that permitted the State to join the European Communities, which would later become the European Union, and provided that European Community law would take precedence over the constitution. It was approved by referendum on 10 May 1972, and signed into law by the President of Ireland Éamon de Valera on 8 June of the same year.

The incorporation of the law of the European Communities into Irish domestic law was put into effect by the European Communities Act 1972, which became law on the day Ireland acceded to the European Communities on 1 January 1973.

== Background ==
Belgium, France, West Germany, Italy, Luxembourg and the Netherlands formed the European Coal and Steel Community in 1951. In 1957, the same six countries formed the European Economic Community and European Atomic Energy Community. Together, these were known as the European Communities and shared common institutions.

In 1961, Ireland applied to join the European Communities. This application was withdrawn after President of France Charles de Gaulle exercised a veto in respect of the application of the United Kingdom. A second application was made in 1967, and in 1972, the six member states signed a Treaty of Accession with Denmark, Ireland, Norway and the United Kingdom. As Ireland had no nuclear power programme, nor any important coal and steel industries, membership of the Communities primarily concerned the European Economic Community.

In Costa v ENEL (1964), the European Court of Justice established the primacy of European Community law. Therefore, an amendment was needed in order to avoid a conflict with the Constitution of Ireland, which had granted powers exclusively to the Oireachtas (parliament) and the Government of Ireland. It was also possible that many provisions of the Constitution might be found to be incompatible with European law.

== Changes to the text ==
Addition of a new subsection to Article 29.4 of the Constitution:

3° The State may become a member of the European Coal and Steel Community (established by Treaty signed at Paris on the 18th day of April, 1951), the European Economic Community (established by Treaty signed at Rome on the 25th day of March, 1957) and the European Atomic Energy Community (established by Treaty signed at Rome on the 25th day of March, 1957). No provision of this Constitution invalidates laws enacted, acts done or measures adopted by the State necessitated by the obligations of membership of the Communities or prevents laws enacted, acts done or measures adopted by the Communities, or institutions thereof, from having the force of law in the State.

== Oireachtas debate ==
The Third Amendment of the Constitution Bill 1971 was introduced in the Dáil by Tánaiste Erskine H. Childers of Fianna Fáil. Among the opposition parties, it was supported by Fine Gael and opposed by the Labour Party. At the Second Stage debates, it was moved by Taoiseach Jack Lynch. The Labour Party sought to defeat the reading of the bill at second stage; a government motion to prevent this passed by 106 votes to 17, and the bill proceeded to Committee Stage. At Committee Stage, the government accepted a Fine Gael amendment to the final sentence. As initiated, this sentence had begun, "No provision of this Constitution invalidates laws enacted, acts done or measures adopted by the State consequent on membership of the Communities […]"; the amendment replaced the words highlighted in bold with the words "necessitated by the obligations of". It passed all stages in the Dáil on 26 January 1972. It passed all stages in the Seanad on 8 March 1972.

== Views on accession ==
As well as parties represented in the Oireachtas, accession was also supported by employers' and farmers' interest groups. Then President Éamon de Valera privately opposed the state's entry and voted 'no', citing the loss of sovereignty.

Official Sinn Féin (now the Workers Party) opposed the state's entry, citing anti-imperialism and calling the EC a "rich man's club". Provisional Sinn Féin (now Sinn Féin) also opposed the entry, saying it would undermine Irish sovereignty and that the "Common Market Empire would threaten Irish ownership of Irish land".

== Result ==
The Third Amendment was approved with 83.1% in favour to 16.9% against. It was the first amendment to the Constitution to be approved by Irish voters in a referendum.

Third Amendment of the Constitution of Ireland referendum
Choice	Votes	%
For	1,041,890	83.10
Against	211,891	16.90
Total	1,253,781	100.00
Valid votes	1,253,781	99.17
Invalid/blank votes	10,497	0.83
Total votes	1,264,278	100.00
Registered voters/turnout	1,783,604	70.88

Results by constituency
Constituency	Electorate	Turnout (%)	Votes		Proportion of votes	
Constituency	Electorate	Turnout (%)	Yes	No	Yes	No
Carlow–Kilkenny	59,415	74.6%	36,588	7,278	83.4%	16.6%
Cavan	37,229	74.3%	24,266	3,178	88.4%	11.6%
Clare	39,413	67.4%	22,833	3,510	86.7%	13.3%
Clare–South Galway	34,820	72.1%	22,027	2,855	88.5%	11.5%
Cork City North-West	36,115	70.1%	21,208	3,995	84.3%	15.7%
Cork City South-East	36,476	75.4%	22,887	4,492	83.6%	16.4%
Cork Mid	49,402	77.3%	31,962	6,050	84.1%	15.9%
Cork North-East	50,016	76.6%	32,439	5,544	85.4%	14.6%
Cork South-West	38,285	74.3%	24,553	3,680	87.0%	13.0%
Donegal North-East	37,924	65.6%	22,554	2,030	91.7%	8.3%
Donegal–Leitrim	38,540	67.8%	22,005	3,908	84.9%	15.1%
Dublin Central	46,775	62.7%	22,289	6,750	76.8%	23.2%
Dublin County North	58,761	68.7%	32,004	8,125	79.8%	20.2%
Dublin County South	45,289	72.7%	26,838	5,901	82.0%	18.0%
Dublin North-Central	49,073	68.2%	26,257	7,028	78.9%	21.1%
Dublin North-East	55,483	73.4%	31,637	8,930	78.0%	22.0%
Dublin North-West	44,369	67.0%	22,494	6,978	76.3%	23.7%
Dublin South-Central	50,400	67.5%	25,766	7,955	76.4%	23.6%
Dublin South-East	37,840	68.0%	20,859	4,692	81.6%	18.4%
Dublin South-West	41,740	65.5%	19,893	7,344	73.0%	27.0%
Dún Laoghaire and Rathdown	56,151	72.6%	34,102	6,474	84.0%	16.0%
Galway North-East	34,358	69.3%	21,398	2,283	90.4%	9.6%
Galway West	35,999	62.0%	17,400	4,806	78.4%	21.6%
Kerry North	37,018	67.2%	18,500	6,064	75.3%	24.7%
Kerry South	36,391	66.9%	19,237	4,890	79.7%	20.3%
Kildare	40,065	70.0%	23,213	4,599	83.5%	16.5%
Laois–Offaly	56,344	74.2%	35,728	5,823	86.0%	14.0%
Limerick East	47,001	72.6%	25,957	7,280	78.1%	21.9%
Limerick West	35,904	74.1%	22,971	3,432	87.0%	13.0%
Longford–Westmeath	47,095	70.7%	28,210	4,713	85.7%	14.3%
Louth	40,278	72.2%	24,623	4,187	85.5%	14.5%
Mayo East	34,810	66.9%	20,691	2,422	89.5%	10.5%
Mayo West	34,106	63.6%	19,157	2,332	89.1%	10.9%
Meath	39,040	73.4%	23,765	4,605	83.8%	16.2%
Monaghan	36,214	73.8%	23,179	3,330	87.4%	12.6%
Roscommon–Leitrim	37,682	70.7%	22,964	3,375	87.2%	12.8%
Sligo–Leitrim	38,049	70.4%	22,915	3,598	86.4%	13.6%
Tipperary North	34,754	76.7%	22,147	4,286	83.8%	16.2%
Tipperary South	46,127	76.6%	29,343	5,638	83.9%	16.1%
Waterford	39,513	73.9%	24,086	4,964	82.9%	17.1%
Wexford	49,881	72.2%	28,635	7,105	80.1%	19.9%
Wicklow	39,389	71.1%	22,310	5,502	80.2%	19.8%
Total	1,783,604	70.9%	1,041,890	211,891	83.1%	16.9%

== Aftermath and later developments ==
The European Communities Act 1972 was signed into law on 6 December 1972. This provided a legislative basis for the primacy and direct effect of European Community law. On 1 January 1973, Ireland, Denmark and the United Kingdom became member states of the European Communities (Norway had rejected membership in a referendum).

Unlike in the United Kingdom, where membership to the European Communities was the subject of continued political debate and a post-accession referendum, in Ireland the outcome of the Third Amendment referendum immediately settled the issue of Ireland's place in Europe amongst both the Irish people and its politicians. In the decades that followed Irish support for continued membership would in fact continue to grow.

In Crotty v. An Taoiseach (1987), the Supreme Court of Ireland held that further transfer of power to the European Communities that were not in themselves necessitated by membership of the European Communities (in that instance, approval of the Single European Act) would require further amendments to the Constitution, and therefore require approval by referendum. Subsequent changes to the Treaties of the European Communities and later of the European Union have also required amendments to the Constitution, and therefore have required approval by referendum. These amendments have substantially altered the initial wording of 29.4.3° as inserted by the Third Amendment. in particular, the Twenty-eighth Amendment of the Constitution of Ireland approved in 2009, allowing the ratification of the Treaty of Lisbon, created a different structure to the subsections in Article 29.4.

In later years the various European organisations (with the exception of EAEC) were integrated by the ratification of subsequent treaties into the European Union.

== See also ==
- Politics of the Republic of Ireland
- History of the Republic of Ireland
- Law of the Republic of Ireland
