= Tenth Amendment of the Constitution Bill 1986 =

Proposed amendment to remove the constitutional prohibition on divorce

- 26 June 1986
- To remove the constitutional prohibition on divorce

Results
Choice	Votes	%
Yes	538,279	36.52%
No	935,843	63.48%
Valid votes	1,474,122	99.43%
Invalid or blank votes	8,522	0.57%
Total votes	1,482,644	100.00%
Registered voters/turnout	2,436,836	60.84%

The Tenth Amendment of the Constitution Bill 1986 (bill no. 15 of 1986) was a proposed amendment to the Constitution of Ireland to remove the prohibition on divorce. The proposal was rejected in a referendum on 26 June 1986. It was the first of two referendums held in Ireland on the question of divorce; the Fifteenth Amendment in 1995 allowed for divorce under specified conditions.

== Background ==
The Constitution of Ireland adopted in 1937 included a constitutional ban on divorce. The prohibition reflected the religious values of the document's Catholic drafters, but was also supported by senior members of the Anglican Church of Ireland. In the 1930s, some other countries had similar bans, such as Italy, which would not repeal its ban until the 1970s. By the 1980s, however, many saw the prohibition on divorce as illiberal or as discriminating against those who did not share the Christian attitude to divorce. An Oireachtas Joint Committee on Marital Breakdown was established in 1983, which reported in 1985. It made recommendations on such matters as mediation, judicial separation, child custody, and barring orders; regarding divorce, it recommended that a referendum be held but did not agree on a yes vote.

== Proposed changes to the text ==
Tenth Amendment of the Constitution Bill proposed to delete the following Article 41.3.2° of the Constitution:

2° No law shall be enacted providing for the grant of a dissolution of marriage.

and to substitute that subsection with the following:

2° Where, and only where, such court established under this Constitution as may be prescribed by law is satisfied that:

i. a marriage has failed,
ii. the failure has continued for a period of, or periods amounting to, at least five years,
iii. there is no reasonable possibility of reconciliation between the parties to the marriage, and
iv. any other condition prescribed by law has been complied with,

the court may in accordance with law grant a dissolution of the marriage provided that the court is satisfied that adequate and proper provision having regard to the circumstances will be made for any dependent spouse and for any child of or any child who is dependent on either spouse.

== Oireachtas debate ==
A private member's bill by Labour Party government backbencher Mervyn Taylor to remove the ban on divorce, Tenth Amendment of the Constitution (No. 2) Bill 1985, was defeated in Dáil Éireann on 26 February 1986 by 54 votes to 33.

On 14 May of the same year, Minister for Justice Michael Noonan introduced the Tenth Amendment of the Constitution Bill 1986 on behalf of the Fine Gael–Labour Party government of Garret FitzGerald. It passed the Dáil on 21 May and the Seanad on 24 May.

== Campaign ==
The amendment was supported by government parties Fine Gael and Labour as well as the Workers' Party. It was opposed by Fianna Fáil, the main opposition party, by the Catholic Church and by conservative groups.

The Workers' Party campaigned under the slogan "Civil Divorce is a Civil Right", distributing leaflets in twenty major towns and organising campaign activity in all but two constituencies. The Divorce Action Campaign subsequently acknowledged that Workers' Party activists had provided virtually the entire Yes campaign in some areas.

== Result ==
Tenth Amendment of the Constitution of Ireland Bill 1986
Choice	Votes	%
For	538,279	36.52
Against	935,843	63.48
Total	1,474,122	100.00
Valid votes	1,474,122	99.43
Invalid/blank votes	8,522	0.57
Total votes	1,482,644	100.00
Registered voters/turnout	2,436,836	60.84

Results by constituency
Constituency	Electorate	Turnout (%)	Votes		Percentage of votes	
Constituency	Electorate	Turnout (%)	Yes	No	Yes	No
Carlow–Kilkenny	78,273	61.6	15,211	32,540	31.9	68.1
Cavan–Monaghan	75,717	57.5	11,882	31,365	27.5	72.5
Clare	64,022	58.2	11,707	25,356	31.6	68.4
Cork East	55,522	66.3	10,794	25,856	29.5	70.5
Cork North-Central	63,345	59.7	11,494	26,166	30.5	69.5
Cork North-West	41,319	67.7	5,829	21,959	21.0	79.0
Cork South-Central	74,920	65.2	18,294	30,388	37.6	62.4
Cork South-West	42,171	62.4	7,045	19,135	26.9	73.1
Donegal North-East	44,795	54.0	6,395	17,642	26.6	73.4
Donegal South-West	45,817	52.4	7,225	16,711	30.2	69.8
Dublin Central	69,375	55.9	15,098	23,482	39.1	60.9
Dublin North	46,393	63.1	14,781	14,420	50.6	49.4
Dublin North-Central	56,942	67.5	16,851	21,470	44.0	56.0
Dublin North-East	50,515	66.8	17,173	16,469	51.0	49.0
Dublin North-West	51,989	60.2	14,849	16,344	47.6	52.4
Dublin South	77,144	66.4	27,768	23,248	54.4	45.6
Dublin South-Central	69,864	58.1	18,314	21,945	45.5	54.5
Dublin South-East	67,739	52.8	19,107	16,464	53.7	46.3
Dublin South-West	67,908	60.5	21,915	19,018	53.5	46.5
Dublin West	80,347	59.0	23,089	24,181	48.8	51.2
Dún Laoghaire	76,219	64.9	28,954	20,299	58.8	41.2
Galway East	42,551	60.6	5,961	19,701	23.2	76.8
Galway West	77,286	51.0	14,428	24,626	36.9	63.1
Kerry North	45,480	59.2	7,210	19,497	27.0	73.0
Kerry South	42,413	59.6	6,034	19,080	24.0	76.0
Kildare	74,075	57.6	19,094	23,354	45.0	55.0
Laois–Offaly	74,955	61.5	12,185	33,540	26.6	73.4
Limerick East	67,227	63.2	14,879	27,440	35.2	64.8
Limerick West	43,375	63.5	6,812	20,530	24.9	75.1
Longford–Westmeath	61,072	58.5	10,355	25,087	29.2	70.8
Louth	61,795	64.2	14,135	25,274	35.9	64.1
Mayo East	41,227	57.7	5,734	17,890	24.3	75.7
Mayo West	40,695	55.7	5,916	16,548	26.3	73.7
Meath	73,678	63.4	14,708	31,655	31.7	68.3
Roscommon	41,435	61.6	5,747	19,597	22.7	77.3
Sligo–Leitrim	59,551	60.3	10,490	25,073	29.5	70.5
Tipperary North	41,516	66.2	6,972	20,323	25.5	74.5
Tipperary South	54,887	65.2	9,649	25,869	27.2	72.8
Waterford	59,614	64.4	12,555	25,415	33.1	66.9
Wexford	69,541	63.3	13,470	30,312	30.8	69.2
Wicklow	64,127	60.6	18,170	20,574	46.9	53.1
Total	2,436,836	60.8	538,279	935,843	36.5	63.5

== Aftermath ==
The Judicial Separation and Family Law Reform Act 1989, enacted three years after the referendum, had been initiated as a private member's bill by Fine Gael backbencher Alan Shatter. This allowed for separation to be recognised by the courts, without the right to remarry.

The Fifteenth Amendment of the Constitution Act 1995 was proposed by Mervyn Taylor, now as Minister for Equality and Law Reform, which again proposed to allow for divorce in certain circumstances. It was narrowly passed by referendum on 24 November 1995 with 50.3 of the vote.

== Sources ==
Primary

- Taylor, Mervyn (1 November 1985). "Tenth amendment of the Constitution (no.2) bill 1985 : as introduced" (PDF) (in English and Irish). Dublin: Stationery Office.
- "Tenth Amendment of the Constitution (No. 2) Bill, 1985 (Bill 36 of 1985)". Bills. Oireachtas. Debates.
- Dukes, Alan (23 April 1986). "Tenth amendment of the Constitution bill 1986 : as initiated" (PDF) (in English and Irish). Dublin: Stationery Office.
- "Tenth amendment of the Constitution bill 1986 : as passed by both Houses of the Oireachtas" (PDF) (in English and Irish). Dublin: Stationery Office. 24 May 1986.
- "Tenth Amendment of the Constitution Bill 1986 (Bill 15 of 1986)". Bills. Oireachtas. Debates.
- "Electoral (Amendment) Act 1986". electronic Irish Statute Book.
- "Judicial Separation and Family Law Reform Act 1989". electronic Irish Statute Book.
