= Crotty v An Taoiseach =

Irish Supreme Court case

The question therefore is whether the State in attempting to ratify this Treaty is endeavouring to act free from the restraints of the Constitution.

— Walsh J

Crotty v An Taoiseach is a landmark 1987 decision of the Irish Supreme Court which found that Ireland could not ratify the Single European Act unless the Irish Constitution was first changed to permit its ratification. The case, taken by Raymond Crotty formally against the Taoiseach (then Garret FitzGerald), directly led to the Tenth Amendment of the Constitution of Ireland (which authorised the ratification of the Single Act) and established that significant changes to European Union treaties required an amendment to the Irish constitution before they could be ratified by Ireland. As a consequence, Ireland, uniquely in the EU, requires a plebiscite for every new, or substantive change to a, European Union Treaty.

The substantive issues in the case revolved around the interpretation of Part III of the Single European Act which codified cooperation on foreign policy matters between the governments of the then twelve member states of the European Economic Community – referred to as European Political Cooperation – into an international agreement. The majority of the Court ruled that if the state ratified Part III, it would amount to an unconstitutional delegation of the state's external sovereignty. The dissenting judges argued that the provisions only constituted a requirement to listen and consult.

== Supreme Court decision ==
The Supreme Court decision was split into two parts. The first dealt with the constitutionality of the European Communities (Amendment) Act 1986 and consequently the first two parts of the Single European Act. The Constitution requires that the Supreme Court only hand down a single judgement in such circumstances.

The second part of the Court's decision considered Raymond Crotty's challenge to the proposed ratification of Part III of the Single European Act. As this did not involve a challenge to the constitutionality of legislation, each judge is free to hand down separate judgements. In a 3-2 decision a majority of the Court found Part III to be repugnant to the Constitution.

=== European Communities (Amendment) Act 1986 ===
The judgement of the Court on the constitutionality of the 1986 Act was given of Finlay CJ. The Court first considered where the 1986 Act could take advantage of the Third Amendment which granted constitutional immunity to legal measures which were necessitated by membership of the European Communities.

It is clear and was not otherwise contended by the defendants that the ratification by the State of the SEA (which has not yet taken place) would not constitute an act 'necessitated by the obligations of membership of the Communities'. It accordingly follows that the second sentence in Article 29, s. 4, sub-s. 3 of the Constitution is not relevant to the issue as to whether the Act of 1986 is invalid having regard to the provisions of the Constitution. (para. 6)

The Court then continued:

It was contended on behalf of the plaintiff that any amendment of the Treaties establishing the Communities made after 1 January 1973, when Ireland joined those Communities would require a further amendment of the Constitution. It was contended on behalf of the defendants that the authorisation contained in the first sentence of Article 29, s. 4, sub-s. 3 was to join Communities which were established by Treaties as dynamic and developing entities and that it should be interpreted as authorising the State to participate in and agree to amendments of the Treaties which are within the original scope and objectives of the Treaties. It is the opinion of the Court that the first sentence in Article 29, s. 4, sub-s. 3 of the Constitution must be construed as an authorisation given to the State not only to join the Communities as they stood in 1973, but also to join in amendments of the Treaties so long as such amendments do not alter the essential scope or objectives of the Communities. To hold that the first sentence of Article 29, s. 4, sub-s. 3 does not authorise any form of amendment to the Treaties after 1973 without a further amendment of the Constitution would be too narrow a construction; to construe it as an open-ended authority to agree, without further amendment of the Constitution, to any amendment of the Treaties would be too broad. (para. 6)

The plaintiff made four arguments challenging the constitutionality of the 1986 Act. These were:

- that the Act unlawfully surrendered Irish sovereignty by changing the decision making process within the Council of Ministers from unanimity to a qualified majority in six policy areas,
- that the potential creation of a European Court of First Instance would be an unlawful delegation of the judicial power of the state,
- that by the addition of four new policy objectives to the Treaty of Rome fell outside the authorisation provided in the Third Amendment, and
- that powers granted to the Council of Ministers in the area of provision of services and concerning the working environment, health and safety of workers were outside the original Constitutional authorisation and could encroach upon rights guaranteed by the Constitution.

The Court rejected all of these arguments. They noted that the Treaty of Rome provided for moving from unanimous voting to qualified majority and concluded that:

The Community was thus a developing organism with diverse and changing methods for making decisions and an inbuilt and clearly expressed objective of expansion and progress, both in terms of the number of its Member States and in terms of the mechanics to be used in the achievement of its agreed objectives. (para. 13)

The Court ruled further that the "new" policy areas fell within the original objectives of the Treaty of Rome, that the creation of a new court would not increase the judicial power already delegated to the European institutions, and that the Plaintiff had failed to show how the new powers to be granted to the Council of Ministers could threaten constitutional rights.

=== Part III of the Single European Act ===
Walsh and Henchy JJ. gave separate judgements with which Hederman J. concurred. They ruled that were Ireland to ratify Part III it would amount to unconstitutional delegation of the state's external sovereignty. They rejected the argument that the constitutionality of a treaty could only be questioned when it was incorporated into law by a statute and ruled that the courts had the power to interfere in the government's exercise of foreign affairs in the case of there being a "clear disregard by the government of the powers and duties conferred on it by the Constitution."

The Court's dissenting members argued that the courts had no jurisdiction to question the constitutionality of a treaty which had not been incorporated into the law of the state. While they agreed with the majority that the courts could interfere with the government's exercise of the state's foreign affairs in the case of a clear disregard of the Constitution, they did not agree that the government had shown any such disregard.

Walsh J.

the Government is the sole organ of the State in the field of international relations. This power is conferred upon it by the Constitution which provides in Article 29, s. 4 that this power shall be exercised by or on the authority of the Government. In this area the Government must act as a collective authority and shall be collectively responsible to Dáil Éireann and ultimately to the people. In my view it would be quite incompatible with the freedom of action conferred on the Government by the Constitution for the Government to qualify that freedom or to inhibit it in any manner by formal agreement with other States as to qualify it. (para. 60)

Henchy J.

Without going further into Article 30, it is clear from those provisions that once the Member States ratify this Treaty each state's foreign policy will move from a national to a European or Community level. (para. 71)

Hederman J

It appears to me that the essential point at issue is whether the State can by any act on the part of its various organs of government enter into binding agreements with other states, or groups of states, to subordinate, or to submit, the exercise of the powers bestowed by the Constitution to the advice or interests of other states, as distinct from electing from time to time to pursue its own particular policies in union or in concert with other states in their pursuit of their own similar or even identical policies. (para. 105)

The State's organs cannot contract to exercise in a particular procedure their policy-making roles or in any way to fetter powers bestowed unfettered by the Constitution. They are the guardians of these powers, not the disposers of them. (para. 106)

Finlay CJ

The detailed terms of [Article 30 of the SEA] impose obligations to consult; to take full account of the position of other partners; to ensure that common principles and objectives are gradually developed and defined; as far as possible to refrain from impeding the formation of a consensus and the joint action which this could produce; to be ready to cooperate policies more closely on the political aspects of security. They do not impose any obligations to cede any national interest in the sphere of foreign policy. They do not give to other High Contracting Parties any right to override or veto the ultimate decision of the State on any issue of foreign policy. They impose an obligation to listen and consult and grant a right to be heard and to be consulted. (para. 22)

Griffin J

Having regard to the terms in which the provisions of Title III are expressed, I am in complete agreement with the Chief Justice in concluding that those provisions do not impose any obligations to cede any sovereignty or national interest in the field of foreign policy, nor do they in any way allow a decision of the State on any issue of foreign policy to be overridden or vetoed. The Treaty, being an international agreement to which the State is a party, has been laid before and been approved by Dáil Éireann in compliance with the provisions of Article 29, s. 5, sub-ss. 1 and 2 of the Constitution. The Government is therefore, in my opinion, as the organ of government by which the executive power of the State is to be exercised pursuant to Article 29, s. 4 of the Constitution, entitled to ratify the Treaty without the necessity of an amendment of the Constitution. (para. 89)
