= The European Alliance of EU-critical Movements =

Former Eurosceptic European political alliance

The European Alliance of EU-critical Movements or TEAM was a Eurosceptic and EU-critical European political alliance gathering parties and NGOs.

The coordinator of TEAM was Jesper Morville from the Danish People's Movement against the EU.

== Affiliates ==
=== Austria ===
- EU Withdrawal Party (EU-Austrittspartei) http://www.euaustrittspartei.at/
- Neutral Free Austria (German: Bündnis Neutrales Freies Österreich, NFÖ)
- Communist Party of Austria (observer)
- Friedensbüro Wien (observer)
- Liste der EU-Opposition

=== Czech Republic ===
- Independent Group Faithful we Remain (observer)

=== Denmark ===
- People's Movement against the EU
- Ungdom mod EU
- Demokratisk Fornyelse
- Enhedslisten (observer)

=== Estonia ===
- Liikumine Ei Euroopa Liidule

=== Finland ===
- Vaihtoehto EU:lle
- Naisten Vaihtoehto EU:lle
- Independence Party (Finland)

=== France ===
- Rassemblement pour l’Indépendance et la Souveraineté de la France
- Les Alternatifs (observer)

=== Greece ===
- The EAN Movement
- Association of Social and Ecological Intervention (observer)

=== Iceland ===
- Heimssýn

=== Ireland ===
- National Platform
- Peace and Neutrality Alliance
- People's Movement

=== Latvia ===
- Kustiba par Neatkaribu

=== Malta ===
- The Campaign for National Independence

=== Netherlands ===
- Free Europe (observer)

=== Norway ===
- Nei til EU
- Ungdom mot EU
- Senterungdommen
- Senterpartiet (observer)
- Rød Valgallianse (observer)

=== Slovenia ===
- Skupina Neutro (observer)

=== Spain ===
- Una Altra Democràcia és Possible (observer)

=== Sweden ===
- Miljöpartiet de Gröna
- EU-kritiska Centernätverket
- Folkrörelsen Nej till EU

=== Switzerland ===
- Forum für direkte Demokratie
- Young 4 FUN

=== United Kingdom ===
- Campaign for an Independent Britain
- Campaign Against Euro-Federalism
- Clannasaor
- The Bruges Group
- United Kingdom Independence Party
- Youth for a Free Europe
- Labour Euro-Safeguards Campaign (observer)
- Green Party of England and Wales (observer)
- Democracy Movement (observer)
- European Foundation (observer)

== See also ==
- European Referendum Campaign
