= Twenty-eighth Amendment of the Constitution of Ireland =

To permit the state to ratify the Treaty of Lisbon

- 2 October 2009
- To permit the state to ratify the Treaty of Lisbon

Results
Choice	Votes	%
Yes	1,214,268	67.13%
No	594,606	32.87%
Valid votes	1,808,874	99.60%
Invalid or blank votes	7,224	0.40%
Total votes	1,816,098	100.00%
Registered voters/turnout	3,078,132	59%
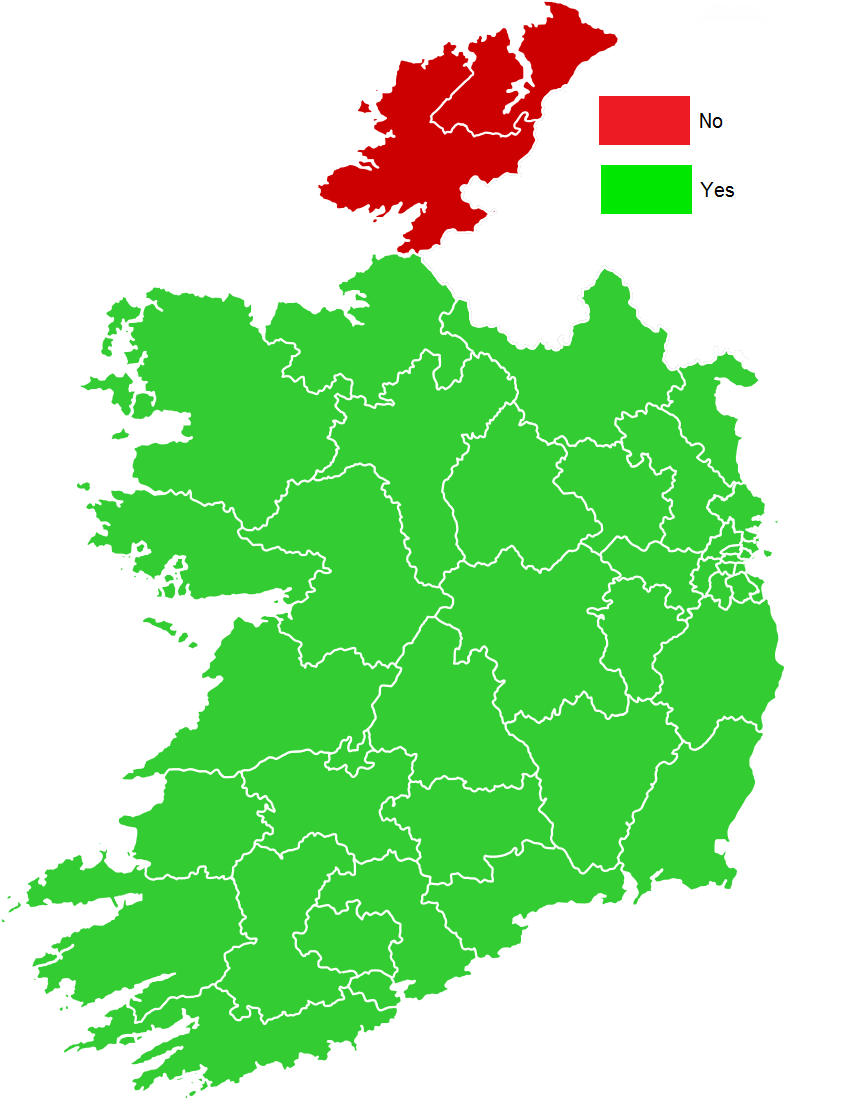
- Declared results by constituency 3 October 2009. Yes No

Result and turnout for the referendum

The Twenty-eighth Amendment of the Constitution (Treaty of Lisbon) Act 2009 (previously bill no. 49 of 2009) is an amendment of the Constitution of Ireland which permitted the state to ratify the Treaty of Lisbon of the European Union. It was approved by referendum on 2 October 2009 (sometimes known as the second Lisbon referendum).

The amendment was approved by the Irish electorate by 67.1% to 32.9%, on a turnout of 59%. The amendment's enactment followed the failure of a previous attempt which was rejected in the first Lisbon referendum, held in June 2008. The successful referendum in 2009 represented a swing of 20.5% to the "Yes" side, from the result in 2008.

Following the referendum, Dáil Éireann (the lower house of parliament) gave its approval to the Treaty on 8 October 2009. The President of Ireland Mary McAleese signed the amendment of the constitution into law on 15 October. These formalities having been conducted, the state ratified the treaty by depositing the instrument of ratification with the Italian government on 23 October. The Treaty of Lisbon entered into force on 1 December 2009.

== Background ==
A 1987 decision of the Supreme Court established that ratification by Ireland of any significant amendment to the Treaties of the European Union requires an amendment to the Constitution of Ireland. All constitutional amendments require approval by referendum.

A referendum on the Treaty establishing a Constitution for Europe of the European Union was expected to be held in 2005 or 2006 but was cancelled following the rejection of the Constitution by voters in France in May 2005 and in the Netherlands in June 2005. The Treaty of Lisbon represents the European-wide political compromise that was agreed upon in the wake of the rejection of the Constitution. It preserves most of the content of the Constitution, especially the new rules on the functioning of the European Institutions, but gives up any symbolic reference to a Constitution. (See Treaty of Lisbon compared to the European Constitution.)

=== First Lisbon referendum ===
The 'Twenty-eighth Amendment of the Constitution Bill 2008' was a proposal to amend the Constitution of Ireland to enable ratification of the Treaty of Lisbon (also known as the Reform Treaty) of the European Union, so it could be enacted as scheduled on 1 January 2009. As part of the enactment of the bill, a referendum was held on 12 June 2008. The proposal was defeated by 53.4% to 46.6%, with a turnout of 53.1%.

Ireland was the only EU member state that held public referendums on the Treaty. Ratification of the Treaty in all other member states was decided upon by the states' national parliaments. The referendum was part of the larger EU ratification of the Treaty, which required that all EU members and the European Parliament must ratify it. A "No" vote in the referendum could have blocked the treaty in the EU altogether. However, the Treaty of Nice was ratified by Ireland in 2002 in a second referendum after the first vote rejected it by a narrow margin in 2001.

EU member states later issued a set of guarantees to the Irish government, indicating that the Lisbon treaty would not effect changes regarding taxation, military activity, or abortion in Ireland, which led to a second referendum.

== Changes to the text ==
Before the amendment, the wording of Article 29.4 of the Constitution of Ireland was:

1° The executive power of the State in or in connection with its external relations shall in accordance with Article 28 of this Constitution be exercised by or on the authority of the Government.

2° For the purpose of the exercise of any executive function of the State in or in connection with its external relations, the Government may to such extent and subject to such conditions, if any, as may be determined by law, avail of or adopt any organ, instrument, or method of procedure used or adopted for the like purpose by the members of any group or league of nations with which the State is or becomes associated for the purpose of international co-operation in matters of common concern.

3° The State may become a member of the European Coal and Steel Community (established by Treaty signed at Paris on the 18th day of April 1951), the European Economic Community (established by Treaty signed at Rome on the 25th day of March 1957) and the European Atomic Energy Community (established by Treaty signed at Rome on the 25th day of March 1957). The State may ratify the Single European Act (signed on behalf of the Member States of the Communities at Luxembourg on the 17th day of February 1986, and at the Hague on the 28th day of February 1986).

4° The State may ratify the Treaty on European Union signed at Maastricht on the 7th day of February 1992, and may become a member of that Union.

5° The State may ratify the Treaty of Amsterdam amending the Treaty on European Union, the Treaties establishing the European Communities and certain related Acts signed at Amsterdam on the 2nd day of October 1997.

6° The State may exercise the options or discretions provided by or under Articles 1.11, 2.5 and 2.15 of the Treaty referred to in subsection 5 of this section and the second and fourth Protocols set out in the said Treaty but any such exercise shall be subject to the prior approval of both Houses of the Oireachtas.

7° The State may ratify the Treaty of Nice amending the Treaty on European Union, the Treaties establishing the European Communities and certain related Acts signed at Nice on the 26th day of February 2001.

8° The State may exercise the options or discretions provided by or under Articles 1.6, 1.9, 1.11, 1.12, 1.13 and 2.1 of the Treaty referred to in subsection 7 of this section but any such exercise shall be subject to the prior approval of both Houses of the Oireachtas.

9° The State shall not adopt a decision taken by the European Council to establish a common defence pursuant to Article 1.2 of the Treaty referred to in subsection 7 of this section where that common defence would include the State.

10° No provision of this Constitution invalidates laws enacted, acts done or measures adopted by the State which are necessitated by the obligations of membership of the European Union or of the Communities, or prevents laws enacted, acts done or measures adopted by the European Union or by the Communities or by institutions thereof, or by bodies competent under the Treaties establishing the Communities, from having the force of law in the State.

11° The State may ratify the Agreement relating to Community Patents drawn up between the Member States of the Communities and done at Luxembourg on the 15th day of December 1989.

The Twenty-eighth Amendment amended the text of subsection 3° to read:

3° The State may become a member of the European Atomic Energy Community (established by Treaty signed at Rome on the 25th day of March 1957).

Subsections 4° to 11° were deleted and the following were inserted as subsections 4° to 9°

4° Ireland affirms its commitment to the European Union within which the Member States of that Union work together to promote peace, shared values and the well-being of their peoples.

5° The State may ratify the Treaty of Lisbon amending the Treaty on European Union and the Treaty establishing the European Community, signed at Lisbon on the 13th day of December 2007 ("Treaty of Lisbon"), and may be a member of the European Union established by virtue of that Treaty.

6° No provision of this Constitution invalidates laws enacted, acts done or measures adopted by the State, before, on or after the entry into force of the Treaty of Lisbon, that are necessitated by the obligations of membership of the European Union referred to in subsection 5 of this section or of the European Atomic Energy Community, or prevents laws enacted, acts done or measures adopted by—

i. the said European Union or the European Atomic Energy Community, or by institutions thereof,
ii. the European Communities or European Union existing immediately before the entry into force of the Treaty of Lisbon, or by institutions thereof, or
iii. bodies competent under the treaties referred to in this section,

from having the force of law in the State.

7° The State may exercise the options or discretions—

i. to which Article 20 of the Treaty on European Union relating to enhanced cooperation applies,
ii. under Protocol No. 19 on the Schengen acquis integrated into the framework of the European Union annexed to that treaty and to the Treaty on the Functioning of the European Union (formerly known as the Treaty establishing the European Community), and
iii under Protocol No. 21 on the position of the United Kingdom and Ireland in respect of the area of freedom, security and justice, so annexed, including the option that the said Protocol No. 21 shall, in whole or in part, cease to apply to the State,

but any such exercise shall be subject to the prior approval of both Houses of the Oireachtas.

8° The State may agree to the decisions, regulations or other acts—

i. under the Treaty on European Union and the Treaty on the Functioning of the European Union authorising the Council of the European Union to act other than by unanimity,
ii. under those treaties authorising the adoption of the ordinary legislative procedure, and
iii. under subparagraph (d) of Article 82.2, the third subparagraph of Article 83.1 and paragraphs 1 and 4 of Article 86 of the Treaty on the Functioning of the European Union, relating to the area of freedom, security and justice,

but the agreement to any such decision, regulation or act shall be subject to the prior approval of both Houses of the Oireachtas.

9° The State shall not adopt a decision taken by the European Council to establish a common defence pursuant to Article 42 of the Treaty on European Union where that common defence would include the State.

== Referendum campaign ==
A Referendum Commission was established by Minister for the Environment, Heritage and Local Government John Gormley. It was chaired by High Court judge Frank Clarke. Its role was to prepare one or more statements containing a general explanation of the subject matter of the proposal and of the text of the proposal in the amendment bill.

=== Participants ===
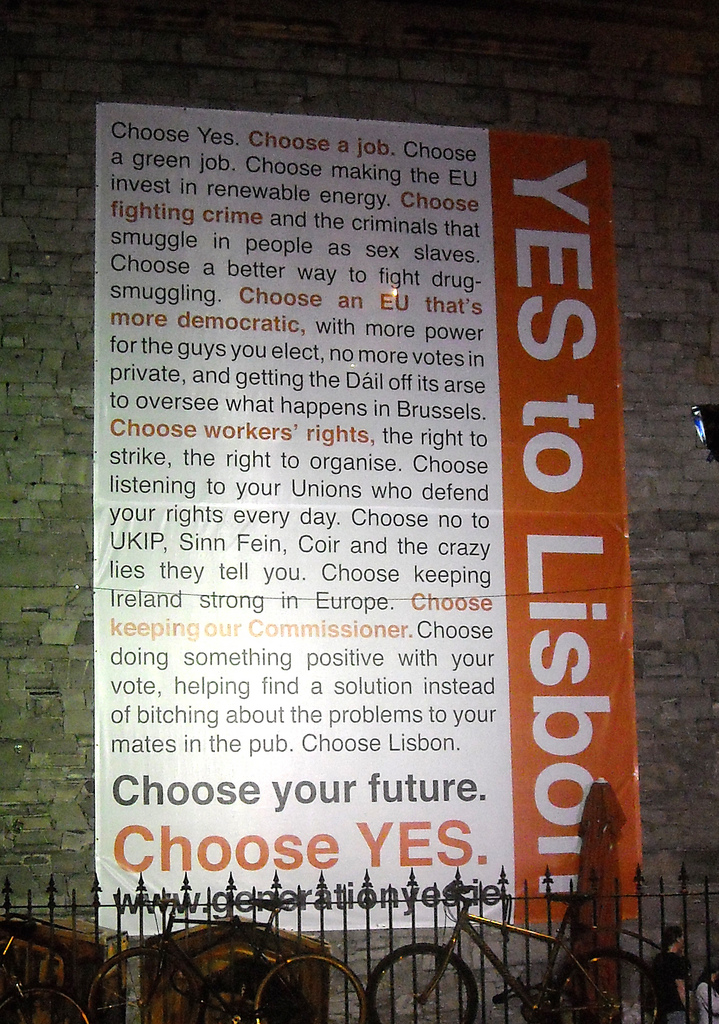
Yes campaign poster – Dublin, October 2009

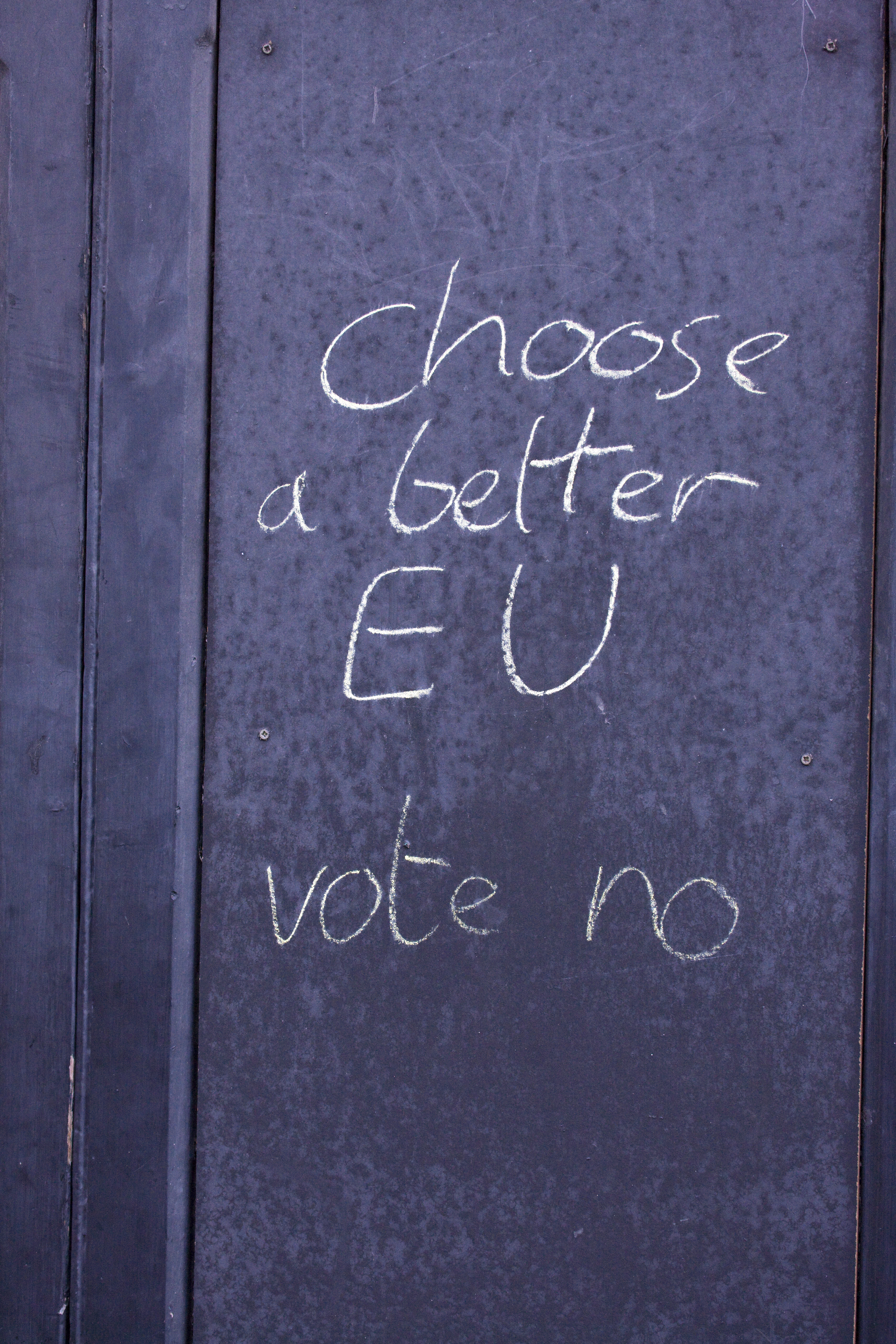
"No" graffiti, Dublin

Organisation	Notable personnel	Stance
Cóir	Richard Greene	No
Fianna Fáil	Brian Cowen, Micheál Martin	Yes
Fine Gael	Enda Kenny	Yes
Generation Yes	Andrew Byrne	Yes
Green Party	John Gormley	Yes
Intel Ireland	Jim O'Hara	Yes
Ireland for Europe	Pat Cox	Yes
Labour Party	Eamon Gilmore	Yes
The Liberals	Neil Nelligan	Yes
Libertas	Declan Ganley	No
National Platform	Anthony Coughlan	No
Peace and Neutrality Alliance	Roger Cole	No
Socialist Workers Party	Richard Boyd Barrett	No
People's Movement	Patricia McKenna	No
Ryanair	Michael O'Leary	Yes
Sinn Féin	Gerry Adams, Mary Lou McDonald	No
Socialist Party	Joe Higgins	No
EFD	Nigel Farage	No
We Belong	Olivia Buckley	Yes
Women for Europe	Michelle O'Donnell and Niamh Gallagher	Yes
Workers' Party	Mick Finnegan	No

== Opinion polls ==
Date of opinion poll	Conductor	Commissioned by	Sample size	For	Against	Undecided
27 September 2009	Quantum Research	Sunday Independent	1,000	68%	17%	15%
26 September 2009	Red C	Sunday Business Post	1,000	55%	27%	18%
25 September 2009	TNS/mrbi	Irish Times	1,000	48%	33%	19%
18 September 2009	Millward Brown/Lansdowne	?	1,000	53%	26%	21%
12 September 2009	Quantum Research	Sunday Independent	1,000	63%	15%	22%
12 September 2009	Red C	Sunday Business Post	1,000	52%	25%	23%
4 September 2009	TNS/mrbi	?	1,000	46%	29%	25%
28 May 2009	TNS/mrbi	?	2,000	54%	28%	18%
13 May 2009	TNS/mrbi	?	2,000	52%	29%	19%
25 April 2009	Quantum Research	?	500	54%	24%	22%
28 January 2009	Red C	Sunday Business Post	1,001	58%	28%	14%
23 January 2009	Millward Brown/Lansdowne	?	1,000	58%	29%	12%
20 January 2009	Quantum Research	?	500	55%	37%	8%

== Voting ==
There were 3,078,132 voters on the electoral register. With the exception of some outlying islands that went to the polls two days ahead of the rest of the country, official voting took place on Friday, 2 October 2009 between 07:00 and 22:00. Counting began the following morning at 09:00.

== Result ==
Twenty-eighth Amendment of the Constitution of Ireland Bill 2009
Choice	Votes	%
For	1,214,268	67.13
Against	594,606	32.87
Total	1,808,874	100.00
Valid votes	1,808,874	99.60
Invalid/blank votes	7,224	0.40
Total votes	1,816,098	100.00
Registered voters/turnout	3,078,132	59.00

Result by constituency
Constituency	Electorate	Turnout (%)	Votes		Proportion of votes		± Yes 2008
Constituency	Electorate	Turnout (%)	Yes	No	Yes	No	± Yes 2008
Carlow–Kilkenny	104,387	58.0%	42,499	17,755	70.5%	29.5%	+20.5%
Cavan–Monaghan	95,270	59.1%	34,740	21,301	62.0%	38.0%	+16.8%
Clare	82,292	56.9%	33,707	12,898	72.3%	27.7%	+20.5%
Cork East	84,411	57.5%	31,956	16,387	66.1%	33.9%	+23.1%
Cork North-Central	65,348	59.6%	21,642	17,136	55.8%	44.2%	+20.2%
Cork North-West	64,759	60.8%	27,249	11,942	69.5%	30.5%	+23.4%
Cork South-Central	89,655	60.3%	36,040	17,874	66.8%	33.2%	+20.2%
Cork South-West	58,657	60.6%	23,764	11,615	67.2%	32.8%	+22.8%
Donegal North-East	56,935	51.4%	14,156	15,005	48.5%	51.5%	+13.2%
Donegal South-West	60,340	52.3%	15,623	15,794	49.7%	50.3%	+13.1%
Dublin Central	56,451	53.3%	18,545	11,396	61.9%	38.1%	+18.1%
Dublin Mid-West	62,651	55.8%	21,435	13,424	61.5%	38.5%	+21.9%
Dublin North	83,251	61.3%	36,971	13,895	72.7%	27.3%	+22.1%
Dublin North-Central	50,946	65.6%	23,692	9,624	71.1%	28.9%	+20.5%
Dublin North-East	52,499	63.4%	21,045	12,117	63.5%	36.5%	+20.3%
Dublin North-West	49,813	57.6%	15,734	12,850	55.0%	45.0%	+18.6%
Dublin South	98,225	59.5%	47,549	10,672	81.7%	18.3%	+18.8%
Dublin South-Central	80,756	55.5%	25,854	18,742	58.0%	42.0%	+19.0%
Dublin South-East	54,794	54.7%	23,478	6,365	78.7%	21.3%	+17.0%
Dublin South-West	68,497	57.7%	23,192	16,178	58.9%	41.1%	+24.0%
Dublin West	52,649	59.5%	21,429	9,852	68.5%	31.5%	+20.6%
Dún Laoghaire	76,503	74.2%	45,917	10,651	81.2%	18.8%	+17.7%
Galway East	80,320	56.1%	30,549	14,306	68.1%	31.9%	+21.2%
Galway West	86,538	54.2%	31,000	15,732	66.3%	33.7%	+20.2%
Kerry North	55,511	55.6%	19,543	11,193	63.6%	36.4%	+23.2%
Kerry South	52,023	58.4%	20,092	10,170	66.4%	33.6%	+23.8%
Kildare North	73,606	57.3%	32,012	10,002	76.2%	23.8%	+21.6%
Kildare South	56,177	55.3%	21,568	9,373	69.7%	30.3%	+21.6%
Laois–Offaly	107,303	59.6%	46,624	17,097	73.2%	26.8%	+17.2%
Limerick East	73,734	61.0%	30,210	14,607	67.4%	32.6%	+21.4%
Limerick West	58,206	58.1%	23,366	10,343	69.3%	30.7%	+24.7%
Longford–Westmeath	88,390	53.4%	30,870	16,156	65.6%	34.4%	+19.3%
Louth	84,360	58.8%	30,116	19,241	61.0%	39.0%	+19.1%
Mayo	95,466	58.0%	34,056	21,132	61.7%	38.3%	+23.4%
Meath East	68,869	56.1%	27,822	10,653	72.3%	27.7%	+21.4%
Meath West	58,585	61.0%	23,103	12,504	64.9%	35.1%	+20.4%
Roscommon–South Leitrim	59,871	65.0%	25,580	13,194	66.0%	34.0%	+20.4%
Sligo–North Leitrim	56,286	58.9%	21,295	11,744	64.5%	35.5%	+21.2%
Tipperary North	48,446	75.9%	25,768	10,846	70.4%	29.6%	+20.6%
Tipperary South	61,439	54.3%	22,712	10,483	68.4%	31.6%	+21.6%
Waterford	73,589	61.3%	30,744	14,116	68.5%	31.5%	+22.8%
Wexford	103,412	58.8%	39,463	21,067	65.2%	34.8%	+21.2%
Wicklow	86,812	67.9%	41,540	17,174	70.7%	29.3%	+20.9%
Total	3,078,132	59.0%	1,214,268	594,606	67.1%	32.8%	+20.5%

The '± Yes 2008' column shows the percentage point change in the Yes vote compared to the first Lisbon referendum which was rejected in a referendum in 2008.

=== Reaction ===
Taoiseach Brian Cowen said Ireland had taken "a decisive step" by passing the referendum. Tánaiste Mary Coughlan said the No vote across her home county, Donegal, was apparent from around a fortnight previously because of "mixed messages". Fine Gael's leader Enda Kenny described it as "a mature, reflective decision". Eamon Gilmore, leader of the Labour Party, said it was both "sensible" and "necessary". President of the European Commission José Manuel Barroso said the vote ensured it was "a great day" for both Ireland and Europe. President of the European Parliament Jerzy Buzek stated that work would now get underway "to overcome the difficulties" that remained.

Declan Ganley, Libertas leader, said the unexpectedly high Yes vote demonstrated "how scared people are" of the state of the economy. This feeling was echoed by a certain proportion of voters, one of whose attitude was "I'm here because I have a vote and, basically, I've been told what to do with it". The Socialist Party's MEP Joe Higgins praised the performance of the No campaign. Sinn Féin's President Gerry Adams asked why the first referendum had been ignored. Sinn Féin Vice-president Mary Lou McDonald criticised the "dishonourable and depressing" Yes campaign. Richard Greene of Cóir promised the war against the Treaty would continue despite the second result, saying Cóir was "extremely disappointed that the voice of the people was not heard the first time around". Václav Klaus, President of the Czech Republic, described the vote as "tarnished since this is a repeated referendum". Nigel Farage, leader of the United Kingdom Independence Party, said the process had been no different from "a corrupt election in Zimbabwe or Afghanistan". Bruce Arnold, a columnist with the Irish Independent, said the damage done to the disenfranchised by the "tainted outcome" of the referendums would "not be easily fixed".

The European Parliament's rapporteur on the Lisbon Treaty, Richard Corbett, who had joined the referendum campaign in Ireland, said that "Eurosceptics don’t mention that the first referendum was decided by a narrow majority on a small turnout, whereas the second referendum approved the treaty by a comfortable majority on a high turnout"

== Final formalities ==
Subsequent to the referendum, the following formalities were observed:

6 October
The Provisional Referendum Certificate with the full result of the referendum was published in Iris Oifigiúil.
8 October
The Dáil passed a motion approving the terms of the Treaty under Article 29.5.2° of the Constitution
13 October
No petition to the Provisional Referendum Certificate having been lodged with the High Court, the Certificate became final.
15 October
President McAleese signed the amendment act into law
16 October
President McAleese signed the instrument of ratification of the Treaty
23 October
Dick Roche, Minister of State, deposited the instrument of ratification with the Italian government.

== See also ==
- Ratification of the Treaty of Lisbon
- European Commission Representation in Ireland
