= New Ireland Forum =

1983–1984 Irish political forum

The New Ireland Forum was a forum in 1983–1984 at which Irish nationalist political parties discussed potential political developments that might alleviate the Troubles in Northern Ireland. The Forum was established by Garret FitzGerald, then Taoiseach, under the influence of John Hume, for "consultations on the manner in which lasting peace and stability can be achieved in a new Ireland through the democratic process". The Forum was initially dismissed, by Unionists, Sinn Féin, and others, as a nationalist talking-shop. The Forum's report, published on 2 May 1984, listed three possible alternative structures: a unitary state, a federal/confederal state, and joint British/Irish authority. The British Prime Minister, Margaret Thatcher, dismissed the three alternatives one by one at a press conference, each time saying, "that is out", in a response that became known as the "out, out, out" speech. However, Garret Fitzgerald, who described the Forum's report as "an agenda not a blueprint", valued it as establishing a nationalist consensus from which the 1985 Anglo-Irish Agreement could be framed.

== Background ==
In the aftermath of the 1981 hunger strikes, "physical force Irish republicanism" represented by Provisional Sinn Féin was gaining support in Northern Ireland at the expense of the "constitutional nationalism" represented by the Social Democratic and Labour Party (SDLP). Garret FitzGerald became Taoiseach after the Republic's 1981 general election and announced a "constitutional crusade", including a reframing of the state's attitude to Northern Ireland. He lost power quickly but regained it in the November 1982 election. Before the previous month's election to the reconstituted Northern Ireland Assembly, John Hume had proposed a "Council for a New Ireland" in the SDLP manifesto. Fitzgerald persuaded Hume to accept a Forum open to non-nationalist parties, though in the event only nationalist parties joined. The SDLP's participation persuaded Fianna Fáil to join. The forum was open to "all democratic parties which reject violence and which have members elected or appointed to either House of the Oireachtas or the Northern Ireland Assembly". From the Assembly, only the SDLP participated; Sinn Féin were excluded, and the Alliance Party and Unionist parties stayed away. From the Oireachtas, the three main parties —Fianna Fáil, Fine Gael, the Labour Party— joined. Independent TDs and Senators were not eligible for membership. The SDLP was abstentionist in the Unionist-dominated Northern Ireland Assembly, which meant its representatives were able to devote more time to the Forum. Speaking in the House of Commons in July 1984, Hume asserted that the failure of various power-sharing initiatives in Northern Ireland to which the SDLP had agreed, in the face of Unionist opposition, was the impetus for the SDLP boycotting the Assembly in favour of the New Ireland Forum.

The Workers' Party decided not to become members of the Forum. The Democratic Socialist Party was ineligible as its sole TD, Jim Kemmy, had lost his seat in the November 1982 election. These two parties organised a separate "alternative Forum" with the Alliance Party, the Irish Independence Party, and others.

== Members ==
There were 27 members and fourteen alternates.

Party	Fianna Fáil	Fine Gael	Labour	SDLP
Leader	Charles Haughey	Garret FitzGerald	Dick Spring	John Hume
Members	David Andrews; Gerry Collins; Eileen Lemass; Brian Lenihan; Ray MacSharry; Rory O'Hanlon; Jim Tunney; John Wilson	Peter Barry; Myra Barry; James Dooge; Paddy Harte; John Kelly; Enda Kenny; Maurice Manning	Frank Cluskey; Stephen McGonagle; Frank Prendergast; Mervyn Taylor	Austin Currie; Joe Hendron; Eddie McGrady; Seamus Mallon
Alternates	Paudge Brennan; Jackie Fahey; Jimmy Leonard; John O'Leary	David Molony; Nora Owen; Ivan Yates	Eileen Desmond; Mary Robinson	Sean Farren; Frank Feely; Hugh Logue; Paddy O'Donoghue; Paschal O'Hare
Secretary	Veronica Guerin	John Fanagan	Diarmaid McGuinness	Denis Haughey

== Operation ==
Colm Ó hEocha was appointed chairman of the Forum. It had a secretariat staff of 17, seconded from the Irish Civil Service; the salary of the secretary of each of the four participating parties was also paid from the Department of the Taoiseach.

The first session was held in Dublin Castle on 30 May 1983 and the final session on 9 February 1984. There were 11 public sessions, 28 private ones, and visits to Northern Ireland in September 1983 and Great Britain in January 1984. The forum's steering group, comprising the chairman and the four party leaders, met 56 times in total.

== Submissions ==
Submissions were invited in press advertisements; 317 were received, and 31 submitting groups and individuals were invited to make oral presentations to the forum.

Presenter	Session	Notes
Charles Carter	21 September 1983	
Louden Ryan	21 September 1983	Professor of industrial economics at Trinity College Dublin, executive at Bank of Ireland.
Seán MacBride	4 October 1983	
Brian Lennon	4 October 1983	Jesuit priest based in Northern Ireland.
David Harkness	4 October 1983	Professor of history at Queen's University Belfast.
Hugh Munro	4 October 1983	Writer
Robin Glendinning	5 October 1983	Northern Irish playwright
John Robb	5 October 1983	Northern Irish surgeon, member of Seanad Éireann
Michael McKeown	5 October 1983	Teacher, writer, and founder member of National Unity and the National Democratic Party.
John Biggs-Davison	5 October 1983	
Northern Ireland Cross-Community Professional Group	6 October 1983	
Desmond Fennell	6 October 1983	
Roy Johnston	11 October 1983	
Labhrás Ó Murchú	11 October 1983	Comhaltas Ceoltóirí Éireann
Eoghan Ó Néill	11 October 1983	Director of Comhdáil Náisiúnta na Gaeilge, umbrella-group for Irish-language organisations.
Micheál Ó Loingsigh	11 October 1983	Irish Sovereignty Movement
Sydney Callaghan	20 October 1983	Methodist Church in Ireland minister from Belfast
William T. McDowell	3 November 1983	Synod of Dublin, Presbyterian Church in Ireland
Federalism and Peace Movement	3 November 1983	Michael O'Flanagan, Michael O'Mahony
Women's Law and Research Group	17 November 1983	Belfast feminist group campaigning for reform of divorce law. Clare Clark and Eileen Evason.
Samuel James Park	17 November 1983	Former Moderator of the Presbyterian Church in Ireland.
Church of Ireland	21 November 1983	
Richard Kearney and Bernard Cullen	8 December 1983	Professors of philosophy.
George Gordon Dallas	8 December 1983	Belfast Presbyterian physician, representing an ecumenical bible study group.
Irish Information Partnership	8 December 1983	London-based group collating statistics relating to the Troubles; David Roche and Brian Gallagher
Sylvia Meehan	19 January 1984	Chair of the Republic's Employment Equality Agency
Christopher McGimpsey and Michael McGimpsey	19 January 1984	Members of the Ulster Unionist Party
Clive Soley	19 January 1984	British Labour Party MP
Anthony Orr	19 January 1984	Spokesman for a Belfast group of unionist community workers, which submitted papers through the Glencree Centre for Peace and Reconciliation.
Irish Catholic Bishops' Conference	9 February 1984	

== Publications ==
Separately from its final report, the forum published three reports on the economic cost of Partition of Ireland since 1920, and of the Troubles since 1969; it also commissioned reports from external consultants and experts on the cost and logistics of a united Ireland.

=== Report ===
The Forum published its report on 2 May 1984. Its historical treatment heavily criticised the Government of Ireland Act 1920, and the alleged short-term thinking of successive British governments' policy on Northern Ireland. It estimated the high financial cost of the Troubles since 1968, while also acknowledging the high cost of implementing any new political arrangements. It outlined three possible alternative structures for a "new Ireland":

- a "unitary state", i.e. a 32-county Ireland
- a "federal/confederal state" comprising the current states of Northern Ireland and the Republic of Ireland
- or "joint authority" meaning that the British and Irish governments would have equal responsibility for the administration of Northern Ireland; advocated by Richard Kearney and Bernard Cullen.

At Charles Haughey's insistence, the unitary state was presented as the most desirable option, which Fitzgerald later rued as "ritual obeisance".

Unionist historian Graham Walker writes, "The Forum Report did reflect a more considered appreciation of the Unionists' distinctiveness and their attachment to the Union, but it was also replete with time-worn assumptions and stereotypes, and a partisan historical narrative."

== Response ==
Before the Forum's report was issued, the Ulster Unionist Party presented a discussion paper of its own entitled Devolution and the Northern Ireland Assembly: The Way Forward (usually called The Way Forward). This described the Forum thus:

The SDLP and those political parties in the Republic of Ireland presently participating in the New Ireland Forum have all publicly declared their support for the principle that there can be no change in the constitutional status of the territory of Northern Ireland as an integral part of the United Kingdom without the consent of the majority of the people of Northern Ireland. ... British Governments give a formal written guarantee to this principle ... If constitutional nationalists accept the principle of consent, it is difficult to see, in logical terms, why some insist that the British Government should withdraw its guarantee of that self same principle. The answer to this apparent inconsistency lies in the long term political strategy of those who seek a United Ireland. ... Constitutional nationalists appear to behave upon the basis that every form of pressure, short of direct force, is valid to obtain unionist consent. .... The Forum for a New Ireland is an integral part of this strategy. Not only is it a component in the ongoing pressure for consent by producing a charter of republican reasonableness, it is also necessary for it to set up a blueprint for political structures that would, ostensibly, accommodate unionists in a way that the Republic has never been able to do in the past, and which would have been inconsistent with the State's ethos and existing constitution. It now appears at least probable that this entire strategy is about to fail.

The McGimpsey brothers, members of the Ulster Unionist Party, felt the Forum's report totally ignored their contribution.

On 2 July 1984, Jim Prior, Secretary of State for Northern Ireland commented on the Forum's report in the House of Commons:

Most people recognise that parts of it were disappointing and unacceptable to the British Government or British people. However, I recognise that there was positive value in its serious examination of nationalist aspirations, its emphasis on the importance of consent, its unequivocal condemnation of violence, its attempt to understand the Unionist identity and its openness to discuss other views.

In October 1984, in a Seanad debate on the Forum's report, Mary Robinson regretted that "the range of contributors invited to make oral presentations to the Forum was too narrow", and remarked that "witnessing the Catholic Bishops and their representatives being questioned by politicians at the Forum may have marked a modest beginning to a healthy separation of Church and State in Ireland." She endorsed the view of political scientists Kevin Boyle and Tom Hadden, who stated:

The Report of the New Ireland Forum has been widely welcomed as the most positive contribution to solving the Northern Ireland problem for some years. Yet, it is equally widely recognised that the Report's prescriptions are totally unrealistic and can only be pursued, if at all, in ways which are inconsistent with the principles it asserts.

Oliver MacDonagh identified in the report three new developments for Irish nationalism: an unequivocal rejection of not only violence but "even psychological coercion"; an argument for unity based on "basic common interests of North and South" rather than "the horrid rhetoric of rights and righteousness"; and an acknowledgement that "the Ulster Unionist identity was both fundamentally different and a permanent condition".

On 19 November 1984, at a press conference at 12 Downing Street after a British–Irish summit in Chequers, UK prime minister Margaret Thatcher dismissed the report's proposals:

I have made it quite clear ... that a unified Ireland was one solution that is out. A second solution was confederation of two states. That is out. A third solution was joint authority. That is out. That is a derogation from sovereignty. We made that quite clear when the Report was published. Northern Ireland is part of the United Kingdom. She is part of the United Kingdom because that is the wish of the majority of her citizens. The majority wish to stay part of the United Kingdom.

This became known as the "out, out, out" speech.

== Effects ==
Lord Kilbrandon established a committee that produced an unofficial report attempting to reconcile elements of the Forum report and The Way Forward. This report informed the British government's view leading up to the Anglo-Irish Agreement of 1985. Richard Sinnott suggests the Forum report gave Fitzgerald a mandate in the negotiations that produced the Agreement.

Charles Haughey was criticised in the aftermath of the Forum Report's publication for appearing to put a more traditionalist interpretation of its conclusions than other parties. This eventually came to a head when Fianna Fáil, then in opposition party, opposed the 1985 Agreement as incompatible with the Forum's conclusions, while the other three Forum parties supported the Agreement.

The SDLP's view of the "National Question" became the default position of Irish political parties from then and through the Northern Ireland peace process. The SDLP's loss of ground to Sinn Féin in the 1985 local elections in Northern Ireland was attributed in part to the "out, out, out" response to the Forum it had championed. Journalist Brian Feeney suggests that Sinn Féin's "active abstention", where those elected in the 1982 Assembly elections acted as local spokespeople in the media, was more effective than the SDLP's policy of sending its representatives to the Dublin forum.

The Forum has been seen retrospectively as a first acknowledgement by the political parties in the Republic of the need to engage with Ulster unionism and "North-South relationships" rather than ignoring them in favour of the "East-West" relationship with the British government in London. Dermot Keogh called it "one of the most important intellectual exercises in self-definition since the foundation of the state." On the other hand, it has been seen to have led indirectly to a recognition by the British government of the need to include the Republic in the political process: Stephen Collins has said that Irish anger at Thatcher's "out, out, out" speech caused her to soften her tone in future negotiations, which made possible the 1985 Anglo-Irish Agreement.

The relatively non-partisan approach of the forum influenced the National Forum on Europe in 2001 to address Ireland and the European Union.

The 1998 Good Friday Agreement, the key stage in the Northern Ireland peace process, provides for a united Ireland if a majority in Northern Ireland agree; it does not provide specifics of the process or settlement. Irish jurist Richard Humphreys in a 2009 book suggests that the New Ireland Forum would provide a model for "nationalist Ireland negotiating and agreeing, so far as possible, the kind of unity that would be put to the people in [...] a referendum". After the 2016 UK vote to leave the EU renewed Irish politicians' consideration of a united Ireland, a 2017 Oireachtas committee report endorsed Humphreys' call for what it termed a "New Ireland Forum 2".

== See also ==
- Irish Convention (1917–18)
- Forum for Peace and Reconciliation (1994–2003)
- Northern Ireland Forum (1996–98)
- Belfast Agreement 1998
