= Anthony Coughlan =

Anthony Coughlan is an Irish academic, secretary of the National Platform, and retired Senior Lecturer Emeritus in Social Policy at Trinity College, Dublin.

He has contributed to various debates in the media such as on RTÉ's Questions and Answers, both in his capacity as a lecturer and as a spokesperson for lobby groups such as the National Platform. He opposed EU enlargement and EU treaties such as the Single European Act, Maastricht Treaty, Amsterdam Treaty, Nice Treaty, Nice Treaty re-run and the Lisbon Treaty.

He made contributions to the post-Lisbon Treaty debate and made submissions to the Oireachtas Committee on Europe on behalf of the National Platform.

== Early life and education ==
Born in Cork, he became politicised while studying English, history and economics at University College Cork in the 1950s, setting up a branch of the Labour Party in the college. He moved to London where he studied for a postgraduate degree in Social Policy at the University of London. In London he joined the Connolly Association, and befriended the republican socialist C. Desmond Greaves.

== Career ==
He returned to Ireland in 1961 and began lecturing at Trinity College Dublin. He became involved in the Wolfe Tone Society when it was set up in 1964 acting as its secretary as well as the Dublin Housing Action Committees, both of which were heavily populated by members of the Republican Movement most of which evolved into Sinn Féin the Workers Party. The Wolfe Tone Society campaigned for civil rights in Northern Ireland and supported the NICRA. Coughlan was editor of Tuairisc, the paper of the Wolfe Tone Society; he was offered the editorship of the United Irishman, but refused it.

He left the Republican Movement in 1970, he was joint secretary with Raymond Crotty of the Common Market Defence Campaign, he participated in the Common Market Study Group and campaigned against Ireland joining the Common Market and has campaigned against greater European integration policies through various organisations since such as the Irish Sovereignty Movement and National Platform, both of which he led.

Coughlan married Muriel Sadlier in 1983.

== Submissions and articles ==
- Tackling the EU Empire: Basic Critical Facts on the EU/Eurozone by Anthony Coughlan, November, 2015
- Turning us into real EU citizens by Anthony Coughlan, Munster Express, Friday, 13 June 2008
- An EU Watershed Decision by Anthony Coughlan, People's Movement website
- Nation, State Sovereignty and the European Union by Anthony Coughlan, Studies An Irish Quarterly Review Issue 369, vol.93, Spring 2004
- Constitution of the Dublin Wolfe Tone Society - Roy Johnston / Anthony Coughlan.
- Archive of Publications by Anthony Coughlan, Open Library
- The Case Against the Common Market, a pamphlet by Anthony Coughlan and Roy Johnston (1967)
