= Irish Treaty of Lisbon referendum =

Irish Treaty of Lisbon referendum may refer to:

- Twenty-eighth Amendment of the Constitution Bill 2008, a failed proposal to ratify the Treaty of Lisbon, held on 12 June 2008
- Twenty-eighth Amendment of the Constitution of Ireland, a second referendum to ratify the Treaty of Lisbon, held on 2 October 2009

== See also ==
- Ratification of the Treaty of Lisbon
