= Irish Sovereignty Movement =

1970s-80s lobby group

The Irish Sovereignty Movement was a political lobby group in the 1970s and 1980s fronted by Anthony Coughlan who was its chairman. It held meetings and produced publications campaigning on various political issues mainly to do with Irish Independence and its relationship with the Common Market, EEC and European Community, Irish neutrality, as well as Northern Ireland.

The grouping made presentations to the New Ireland Forum in 1983. It also hosted meetings and campaigned against the Single European Act. Coughlan and other ex-members have latterly participated in public debates as members of a similar group called the National Platform.

== Publications ==
- The way to peace in Ireland by Anthony Coughlan (Irish Sovereignty Movement, 1974)
- The EEC: Ireland and the making of a superpower. by Anthony Coughlan (Irish Sovereignty Movement, 1979)
- EEC political union by Anthony Coughlan (Irish Sovereignty Movement Publications, 1985)
