= Forum for Peace and Reconciliation =

Part of the Northern Ireland peace process

Stylised design combining a dove of peace and a hand extended for a handshake of reconciliation

The Forum for Peace and Reconciliation (Irish: an Fóram um Shíocháin agus Athmhuintearas) was a forum established by the government of Ireland in October 1994 as part of the Northern Ireland peace process.

== Initiation ==
The Forum was envisaged in paragraph 11 of the Downing Street Declaration of December 1993:

The Irish Government would make their own arrangements within their jurisdiction to enable democratic parties to consult together and share in dialogue about the political future. The Taoiseach's intention is that these arrangements could include the establishment, in consultation with other parties, of a Forum for Peace and Reconciliation to make recommendations on ways in which agreement and trust between both traditions in Ireland can be promoted and established.

Preparations for the forum were triggered by the ceasefires announced in September 1994 by the republican Provisional IRA and loyalist UVF and UDA, whose associated political parties were thus invited to the forum. Sinn Féin accepted, while the loyalist PUP and UDP rejected, as did the mainstream unionist UUP and DUP. The presence of Sinn Féin alongside constitutional nationalist and centrist parties was considered a significant "confidence building measure"; substantive negotiations involving the unionist parties and the British government would not begin till the following year. The British ambassador was invited to the opening of the forum, but there was no other British involvement. Its terms of reference were:

The Forum for Peace and Reconciliation is being established by the Government in accordance with their intentions as expressed in the Joint Declaration, for as long as is necessary, to consult on and examine ways in which lasting peace, stability and reconciliation can be established by agreement among all the people of Ireland, and on the steps required to remove barriers of distrust, on the basis of promoting respect for the equal rights and validity of both traditions and identities. It will also explore ways in which new approaches can be developed to serve economic interests common to both parts of Ireland, including in the framework of European Union. It will be a fundamental guiding principle of the Forum and of participation in it that all differences relating to the exercise of the right of self-determination of the people of Ireland, and to all other matters, will be resolved exclusively by peaceful and democratic means. The purposes of the Forum will be to provide, as far as possible, an opportunity to both major traditions as well as to others, to assist in identifying and clarifying issues which could most contribute to creating a new era of trust and co-operation on the island. Participation in the Forum will be entirely without prejudice to the position on constitutional issues held by any Party.

== Regular sessions ==
The forum's structure was modelled on the New Ireland Forum of 1983–84. It was chaired by Catherine McGuinness, then a judge of the Circuit Court, and had a secretariat with six members. McGuinness' Protestant background was hoped to encourage unionist engagement with the forum. It first met in Saint Patrick's Hall in Dublin Castle on 28 October 1994. It had 41 plenary sessions and commissioned several reports, and subcommittees began drafting responses to the reports. After the publication of the Joint Framework Document in February 1995, this became the focus of much of the Forum's deliberations.

The forum was drafting a final report "Paths to a Political Settlement: Realities, Principles and Requirements", which was leaked to the press on 2 February 1996. It was believed that Sinn Féin was objecting to the report's recognition of the "principle of consent"/"Unionist veto". The Forum published the draft in its "95% agreement" state. The Canary Wharf bombing on 9 February ended the IRA ceasefire and, with the continued participation of Sinn Féin in question, the Forum was adjourned.

=== Obstacles in the South to Reconciliation ===
Paragraph 6 of the Downing Street Declaration stated in part:

In recognition of the fears of the Unionist community and as a token of his willingness to make a personal contribution to the building up of that necessary trust, the Taoiseach will examine with his colleagues any elements in the democratic life and organisation of the Irish State that can be represented to the Irish Government in the course of political dialogue as a real and substantial threat to their way of life and ethos, or that can be represented as not being fully consistent with a modern democratic and pluralist society, and undertakes to examine any possible ways of removing such obstacles.

Several of the reports the Forum commissioned addressed this issue, and a subcommittee was established on Obstacles in the South to Reconciliation. It considered the reports and made a draft report recommending changes to the Constitution of Ireland, as well as changing the Irish national anthem and tricolour flag. Details of its draft proposals were leaked in 1998. When the Forum was revived in 2002, the draft report was not published as it was felt the intervening events had rendered it obsolete.

=== Delegates ===
There were separate delegations for each political party with elected representatives in either the Republic of Ireland or Northern Ireland, as well as Independents, with "a democratic mandate and a commitment to resolving political differences by exclusively peaceful and democratic means". Unionist and loyalist parties refused to participate as delegates, though some unionists made presentations to the delegates in the public sessions. The delegations were proportional to parties' electoral strength, as follows:

Party	No. of delegates	Delegates	Alternates
Fianna Fáil	9	Bertie Ahern, Mary O'Rourke, Albert Reynolds, Noel Dempsey, Jim McDaid, Séamus Kirk, Ann Ormonde, Éamon Ó Cuív, Brian Lenihan Snr (died 1995)	Charlie McCreevy, Jimmy Leonard, Joe Jacob, Brendan Daly
SDLP	5	John Hume, Seamus Mallon, Eddie McGrady, Joe Hendron, Bríd Rodgers	Sean Farren, Denis Haughey, Mark Durkan, John Fee, Alex Attwood
Fine Gael	6	John Bruton, Austin Currie, Olivia Mitchell, Andrew Boylan, Paul Bradford, Frances Fitzgerald	John Connor, Helen O'Donnell, Tom Honan
Labour	5	Dick Spring, Ruairi Quinn, Brian Fitzgerald, Ann Gallagher, Jan O'Sullivan	Seán Kenny, Seán Malone
Sinn Féin	3	Gerry Adams, Pat Doherty, Lucilita Bhreatnach	Martin McGuinness, Dodie McGuinness
Progressive Democrats	2	Mary Harney, Des O'Malley	Bobby Molloy, Michael McDowell
Alliance	3	John Alderdice, Seamus Close, Seán Neeson	Philip McGarry, Stewart Dickson
Democratic Left	2	Proinsias De Rossa, Seamus Lynch	Liz McManus
Green Party	1	Trevor Sargent	Vincent MacDowell
Independent TDs	1	Neil Blaney (died 1995)	Tom Foxe
Independent Senators	1	Joe O'Toole, David Norris, Mary Henry, Feargal Quinn, J. J. Lee	(Each nominee served as delegate and alternate in rotation.)
Workers' Party	1	John Lowry	—
"Attended in a personal capacity"	1	Gordon Wilson (died 1995)	—

There were observers from the European Parliament (Piet Dankert and Leo Tindemans) and the British-Irish Interparliamentary Body.

=== Proceedings ===
The forum's public sessions were typically held once a week. The proceedings were subsequently published by the Stationery Office, Dublin:

No.	Dates	ISBN	Themes
1	28 October 1994	ISBN 0-7076-1503-8	Inauguration
2	3, 18 November 1994	ISBN 0-7076-1504-6	
3	16 December 1994	ISBN 0-7076-1506-2	"The Economic consequences of Peace": "Building on the Peace Dividend", "Investing in Peace", "The American Role", and "The Role of the European Union"
4	20 January 1995	ISBN 0-7076-1507-0	"Participation in Social and Economic Reconstruction - sharing the Peace Dividend"
5	10 February 1995	ISBN 0-7076-1683-2	Presentation from Roy Garland; Debate on parity of esteem
6	17 February 1995	ISBN 0-7076-1655-7	Tourism; North-South Co-operation; the Washington Conference for Trade and Investment in Ireland
7	24 February 1995	ISBN 0-7076-1656-5	"Social and Economic Reconstruction - Securing the Rights and Interests of Children and Young People"
8	3 March 1995	ISBN 0-7076-1657-3	"North-South Co-operation in Agriculture and Agribusiness"
9	10 March 1995	ISBN 0-7076-1658-1	Policing
10	23 March 1995	ISBN 0-7076-1659-X	Presentations from 'Forum for Change' and 'Northern Consensus' groups
11	24 March 1995	ISBN 0-7076-1684-0	Presentation by the Presbyterian Church in Ireland; Debate on "Fundamental Rights and Freedoms"
12	31 March 1995	ISBN 0-7076-1660-3	Presentation by Committee on the Administration of Justice and Irish Council for Civil Liberties; Debate on justice
13	7 April 1995	ISBN 0-7076-1697-2	Presentations by Colin Crawford and by 'Religious for Justice and Peace' and 'Drumcree Faith and Justice Group'
14	11 April 1995		
15	12 April 1995	ISBN 0-7076-2340-5	Presentations by Robin Wilson and Simon Lee, the West Belfast Economic Forum and the Evangelical Contribution on Northern Ireland
16	5 May 1995	ISBN 0-7076-2341-3	Constitutional Issues in the Light of "A New Framework for Agreement" and other documents
17	12 May 1995	ISBN 0-7076-2454-1	
18	19 May 1995	ISBN 0-7076-2413-4	
19	2 June 1995	ISBN 0-7076-2414-2	
20	9 June 1995	ISBN 0-7076-2415-0	
21	16 June 1995	ISBN 0-7076-2416-9	
22	23 June 1995	ISBN 0-7076-2417-7	
23	30 June 1995	ISBN 0-7076-2342-1	Tributes on the death of Gordon Wilson
24	7 July 1995	ISBN 0-7076-2418-5	Presentation by Bow Group; review of work programme.
25	14 July 1995	ISBN 0-7076-2419-3	protection of rights; economic benefits of peace; obstacles in the South to reconciliation.
26	29 September 1995	ISBN 0-7076-2420-7	Debate on Reconciliation
27	6 October 1995	ISBN 0-7076-2421-5	Debate on the role of education in achieving reconciliation
28	20 October 1995	ISBN 0-7076-2422-3	Presentations from Norman Porter; Sam McAughtry; Meath Peace Group; The Interaction Group
29	10 November 1995	ISBN 0-7076-2423-1	Presentations from Campbell & Hadden and Bradley on their respective studies.
30	17 November 1995		Victims of violence; prisoners' issues.
31	21 November 1995	ISBN 0-7076-2425-8	
32	15 December 1995	ISBN 0-7076-2426-6	Presentation of the five studies commissioned by the subcommittee on Obstacles in the South to Reconciliation
33	19 January 1996	ISBN 0-7076-2427-4	Presentation from the Irish Catholic Bishops' Conference.

== Later work ==
The Northern Ireland Forum established in 1996 became the focus of the peace process, with the relevance of the Forum for Peace and Reconciliation called into question. After the IRA restored its ceasefire, in 1997, new Taoiseach Bertie Ahern envisaged further meetings "on an occasional basis". One was held on 5 December 1997, at which Ahern broached the possibility of amending Articles 2 and 3 of the Constitution; after the 1998 Good Friday Agreement this was effected by a 1999 referendum. Based on the results of 1996 elections to the Northern Ireland Forum, invitations to the 1997 meeting were received and accepted by the Northern Ireland Women's Coalition and Labour Party of Northern Ireland (LPNI) as well as the previous parties. Maurice Hayes replaced Gordon Wilson among the independent Senators.

Asked about the Forum in 1999, Ahern said:

I said that I believed, in the context of the implementation of the Good Friday Agreement, it would be preferable to see the primary axis for future island-wide consultation being the joint parliamentary forum and the independent consultative forum, envisaged in paragraphs 18 and 19, respectively, of strand two of the Good Friday Agreement. In that event, while it would be a matter for the chairperson and the participating parties, I envisage a final concluding meeting of the forum.

There were suggestions that it be revived in 2000 after the suspension of the Northern Ireland Executive, and again in December. Ahern said at the time, "It might come to that point but there are some other ideas we must try first. If it is going nowhere however, I will consider it". It was reconvened in late 2002 after further suspension of the Assembly following spying allegations. As Catherine McGuinness had in the meantime been appointed to the Supreme Court, Maurice Hayes replaced her as chairman. Compared to the 1997 delegates, the LPNI was absent while the Socialist Party was present. One session discussed the Holy Cross dispute in Belfast. The Forum's 2002–3 meetings failed to ameliorate the deadlock in the peace process.

In 2005, Mark Durkan of the SDLP called for it to be reconvened. In 2007, Ahern told the Dáil, "With the restoration of the devolved institutions in Northern Ireland, there are no current proposals to reconvene the Forum for Peace and Reconciliation." In 2010, the Forum's €5000 line item in the Department of the Taoiseach's annual budget estimate was deleted. In 2011, Senator Paul Bradford inquired about the Forum's status and suggested it might be revived as a truth and reconciliation commission. The Reconciliation Networking Forum established in 2006 is an annual forum to which the Minister of Foreign Affairs and Trade invites groups which promote reconciliation.

== Influence ==
The Forum for Peace and Reconciliation and the National Economic and Social Forum provided a model for the National Forum on Europe established in 2001 after the referendum rejecting the Treaty of Nice.

== Publications ==
Some of the Forum's commissioned reports and submissions were published.

- Paths to a political settlement in Ireland: policy papers submitted to The Forum for Peace and Reconciliation. Blackstaff Press. 1995. ISBN 978-0-85640-566-2.
- KPMG Management Consulting; Fitzpatrick Associates; Colin Stutt Consulting; Northern Ireland Economic Research Centre (1995). The social and economic consequences of peace and economic reconstruction. Stationery Office. ISBN 978-0-7076-1645-2.
- Boyle, Kevin; Campbell, Colm; Hadden, Tom (1996). The protection of human rights in the context of peace and reconciliation in Ireland. Stationery Office. ISBN 978-0-7076-2308-5.
- Eide, Asbjørn (1996). A review and analysis of constructive approaches to group accommodation and minority protection in divided or multicultural societies. Stationery Office. ISBN 978-0-7076-2309-2.
- Bradley, John (1996). An island economy: exploring long-term economic and social consequences of peace and reconciliation in the island of Ireland. Stationery Office. ISBN 978-0-7076-2310-8.
- Building trust in Ireland. Blackstaff Press. 1996. ISBN 0-85640-577-9. consisting of five studies commissioned by the subcommittee on Obstacles in the South to Reconciliation:
  Study	Author	Institution
  Obstacles to Reconciliation in the South	Arthur Aughey	University of Ulster Jordanstown
  A Unionist Legal Perspective on Obstacles in the South to Better Relations with the North	Brice Dickson	University of Ulster
  The Role of the Catholic Church in the Republic of Ireland 1922–1995	Dermot Keogh	University College, Cork
  Religious Minorities in the Irish Free State and the Republic of Ireland 1922–1995	Terence Brown	Trinity College Dublin
  Factors affecting Population Decline in Minority Religious Communities in the Republic of Ireland	J. J. Sexton	Economic and Social Research Institute, Dublin
  Factors affecting Population Decline in Minority Religious Communities in the Republic of Ireland	Richard O'Leary	Nuffield College, Oxford
- "Paths to a Political Settlement: Realities, Principles and Requirements (draft)". 2 February 1996. Archived from the original on 2 October 1999.

== See also ==
- New Ireland Forum (1983–84)
- Northern Ireland Forum (1996)
