= Ireland for Europe =

Defunct Irish campaign group

Ireland for Europe was a civil society organisation set up after the defeat of the first Irish referendum to campaign in favour of the Treaty of Nice. Initially chaired by Adrian Langan, it was chaired by Ciarán Toland from October 2001. The campaign team was also led by Michelle O'Donnell (Secretary) and Kevin Byrne (Campaign Director). Ireland for Europe joined the Irish Alliance for Europe in August 2002, forming the backbone of its volunteer canvassing campaign. The group has been inactive since the end of 2002.

In June 2009 a new organisation of the same name was launched with Pat Cox as Director. For this he stepped down from his position as President of the European Movement International.

== See also ==
- Generation Yes
