= Desmond Greaves =

English Marxist and historian (1913–1988)

Greaves as a young man

Charles Desmond Greaves (27 September 1913 – 23 August 1988) was an English Marxist activist and historian. He wrote a number of books on Irish history as a Marxist historian. A member of the Communist Party of Great Britain, through the Connolly Association he was one of the key figures, along with Roy Johnston, responsible for inserting Marxist perspectives into the 1960s Irish republicanism, in relation to the Northern Ireland civil rights movement.

== History ==
Greaves was born in Birkenhead, England. His father, Charles Edward Greaves, a post office official, and his mother, Amy Elisabeth Taylor, were Methodists. He studied at Liverpool University where he graduated in chemistry and botany, he worked as a research chemist at Powell Duffryn. In 1934 he joined Communist Party of Great Britain. In 1941 he joined the Connolly Club which became the Connolly Association, and became editor of its magazine, The Irish Democrat.

During the 1950s Greaves used his influence at the Connolly Association to push the view that the best path to a United Ireland would be to discredit Ulster Unionism in the eyes of British politicians. He believed this could be achieved by exposing how discriminatory the Stormont regime in Belfast was. Greaves' policy was made part of the Connolly Association's constitution in December 1955. From there on out, Greaves and the Connolly Association worked to influence and educate British political opinion, especially on the left and in particular within the British Labour Party. This was no easy task as during the 1940s the Labour Party's stance was to support Unionists, partially as a reward for their support during World War 2. One example of this would be the passing of the Ireland Act 1949, which gave Stormont a veto over any constitutional change relating to Northern Ireland. However, by the end of the 1950s their efforts were bearing fruit; for example, the Association was able to raise the issue of hundreds of prisoners being detained without trial in Northern Ireland under the Special Powers Act of 1922. Thanks to the Associate putting pressure on the British Labour, who in turn put pressure on Lord Brookeborough they were able to force the release of the prisoners. Greaves and the Connolly Association would continue to push Labour against the Unionists into the 1960s, which would later prove to be a key piece of political strategy on the eve of The Troubles.

Greaves became associated with Roy Johnston, a Dublin-born member of the Irish Workers' Party who had migrated to England. They and their theories came to have an influence over 1960s Irish republicanism through Cathal Goulding and Tomás Mac Giolla, who also adhered to a Marxist perspective. During the split within the Irish republican movement in 1969, Greaves' Connolly Association supported Official Sinn Féin (later known as the Workers' Party) and the Official Irish Republican Army, rather than the Provisionals. This was done under the rationale of anti-sectarianism, claiming that the Provisionals were representative of just the Catholic nationalist community.

His library of Irish books is held at the Working Class Movement Library in Salford, deposited by his executor Anthony Coughlan. The Desmond Greaves summer school is held each year as a forum for discussing topics which exercised him, such as Irish left wing, and republican politics.

== Publications ==
- The Life and Times of James Connolly (1961)
- The Easter Rising as History (London 1966)
- Northern Ireland: Civil Rights and Political Wrongs (1969)
- The Irish Crisis (1972, second enlarged edition 1974)
- Liam Mellows and the Irish Revolution (1971)
- Reminiscences of the Connolly Association (1978)
- Sean O'Casey Politics and Art (1979)
- The Easter Rising in Song and Ballad (1980)
- Irish Transport and General Workers' Union: The Formative Years (1982)
