= Ruth Frow =

English peace activist and historian of the labour movement

- Frow in 1939
- Born: Ruth Engel; 28 July 1922; St John's Wood
- Died: 11 January 2008 (aged 85)
- Other name: Ruth Haines
- Known for: Co-founder of the Working Class Movement Library
- Political party: Communist Party of Great Britain
- Spouse: Edmund Frow

Ruth Frow (28 July 1922 – 11 January 2008) was an English peace activist and historian of the labour movement. She co-founded the Working Class Movement Library in Salford, a collection of material associated with labour and working class history.

== Early life and education ==
Ruth Engel was born on 28 July 1922 in St John's Wood in London. Her father, Leon Alfred Mayer Engel, was a concert pianist and a travelling sales representative in embroideries. Her mother, Ethel Maud Engel, was originally Irish Catholic but converted to Judaism, her husband's faith, on their marriage. Ruth attended a Jewish synagogue, but had a largely secular upbringing, and she attended a local private girls’ school.

The family moved to an estate built by a cousin, Engel Park in Mill Hill, when Frow was five. Her father died when she was thirteen.

== Career and politics ==
Upon leaving school, she enrolled in the Women's Auxiliary Air Force in April 1940, though underage, working in the RAF Fighter Command control room and on radar. Her altered date of birth is recorded in her discharge papers, along with a commendation of her service. She spent four and a half years in the WAAF. Here she met her first husband, Denis Edmund Haines, an electrical engineer, and the pair married on 25 July 1944. She left the WAAF when she became pregnant, towards the end of 1944.

In 1945 she joined the Communist Party in Sandwich, Kent, on the recommendation from local miners to join over the Labour Party. She found the Communist Party an ideologically- and socially-attractive space as an activist and a woman not wishing to return to a purely domestic role post-war.

Following the Second World War, Frow enrolled in the Emergency Teacher Training Scheme, and became a teacher in 1949. She was a trade union activist and member of the National Union of Teachers. She was Secretary of Teachers for Peace and Manchester branch of the Peace Committee, and was elected Vice-Chair of the Manchester Campaign for Nuclear Disarmament.

In the 1950s she lived for a time with Communist party members Bill Wainwright and Molly Wainwright.

She met her second husband, Edmund 'Eddie' Frow, in 1953 at a day school on labour history in Sussex, and they married in 1961. The pair were enthusiastic collectors of books, pamphlets and ephemera to do with labour history and the labour movement.

The couple were both awarded honorary degrees from the University of Salford in 1989.

== The Working Class Movement Library ==
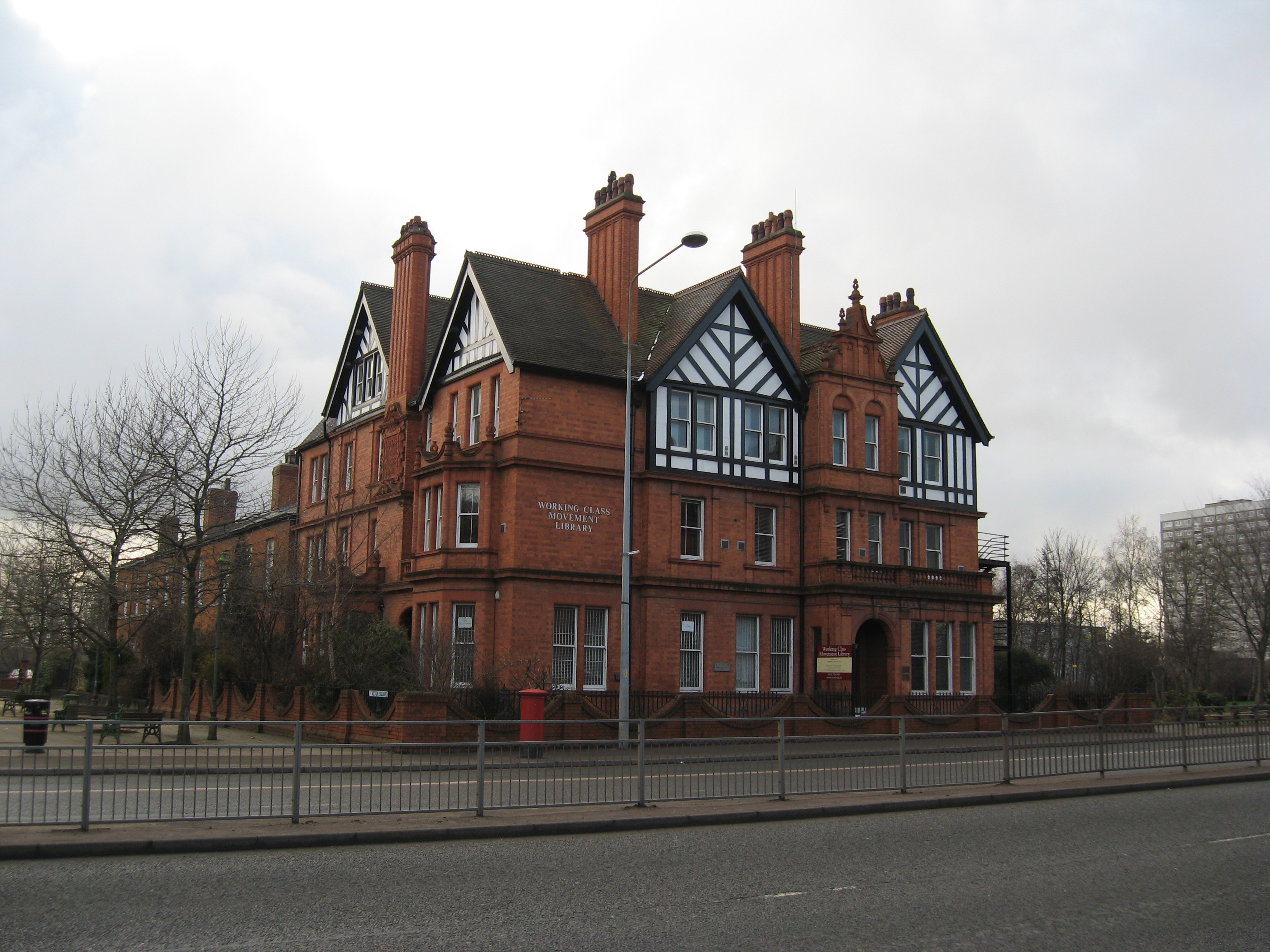
Working Class Movement Library in Salford

Along with her husband Edmund, Frow was the founder of the Working Class Movement Library in Manchester. The library was originally the personal book collection of the couple, which scholars or students of labour history could access for free. In 1972 the Frows established the library as a charitable trust, allowing it to be accessible as an education resource.

Their collection of books and ephemera grew so extensive that in 1987 it was re-housed by Salford Council in a converted nursing home, where it still is: Jubilee House on The Crescent in Salford. The offer from the council was accepted over similar offers from universities in order to avoid limited access for workers to their own history.

In 1989 Ruth and Edmund Frow were awarded the Commendation of Merit by the Library Association for their service to the library profession.

The Library is regarded as one of Britain's most important collections on working class history, with more than 30,000 rare books, pamphlets, photographs and other materials.

== Publications ==
Frow, often along with her husband Edmund, published extensively on historical and political issues. Her writings were aimed at a variety of wide audiences.

- Edmund and Ruth Frow, ‘Travels with a Caravan’, History Workshop Journal 2, autumn 1976.
- Ruth Frow, Edmund Frow (Eddie), 1906–1997: the Making of an Activist, Salford, 1999.
- Ruth and Edmund Frow and Michael Katanka, Strikes – a Documentary History, London, 1971.
- Ruth and Edmund Frow and Michael Katanka, The History of British Trade Unionism, Historical Association, London, 1969.
- Edmund and Ruth Frow, A Survey of the Half Time System in Education, Manchester, 1970.
- Edmund and Ruth Frow, The Battle of Bexley Hill: Salford Unemployed Workers Demonstration in 1931, Salford, 1994.
- Edmund and Ruth Frow, Engineering Struggles: Episodes in the Story of the Shop Stewards Movement, Manchester, 1982.
- Edmund and Ruth Frow and Ernie Roberts MP, Democracy in the Engineering Union, Institute for Workers Control, Nottingham, 1986.
- Ruth and Edmund Frow, The Communist Party in Manchester 1920–1926, North West History Group CPGB with the Working Class Movement Library, Manchester, 1979.
- Political Women 1800–1850, ed. Ruth and Edmund Frow, London, 1989.
- The Politics of Hope: the Origins of Socialism in Britain 1880–1914, ed. Edmund and Ruth Frow, London, 1989.
- Edmund and Ruth Frow, Essays on the Irish in Manchester, Salford, 1991.
- Edmund and Ruth Frow, Essays in Insurrection, Salford, 1996.
- Ruth and Edmund Frow, Karl Marx in Manchester, Manchester, 1985
- Edmund and Ruth Frow, The New Moral World: Robert Owen and Owenism in Manchester and Salford, Manchester, 1986
- Edmund and Ruth Frow, Frederick Engels in Manchester and ‘The Condition of the Working Class in England in 1844’, Salford, 1995
- Edmund and Ruth Frow, William Morris in Manchester and Salford, Salford, 1996.
- Edmund and Ruth Frow, Frederick Engels in Manchester: Two Tours with Maps, Manchester, n.d.
- Edmund and Ruth Frow, A History of the Manchester and Salford Trades Council, vol. I: To Make That Future – Now!, Manchester, 1976
- Ruth and Edmund Frow and Jim Arnison, Manchester Trades Council History, vol. 2: the New Paths Are Begun, Manchester, 1993.

== Personal life and death ==
Frow was a former Middlesex county junior tennis player.

Ruth and Edmund Frow spent many years travelling Britain in a caravan, described in their book Travels with a Caravan. Before moving to a home in Salford, they lived in a flat within the library.

Frow died 11 January 2008. A a celebration of her life was held on 5 April 2008 at the Peel Hall at the University of Salford.

== Notes ==
The papers of Ruth and Edmund Frow are held in the Working Class Movement Library in Salford.
