= Working Class Movement Library =

Library in Salford, UK, focussing on working-class people

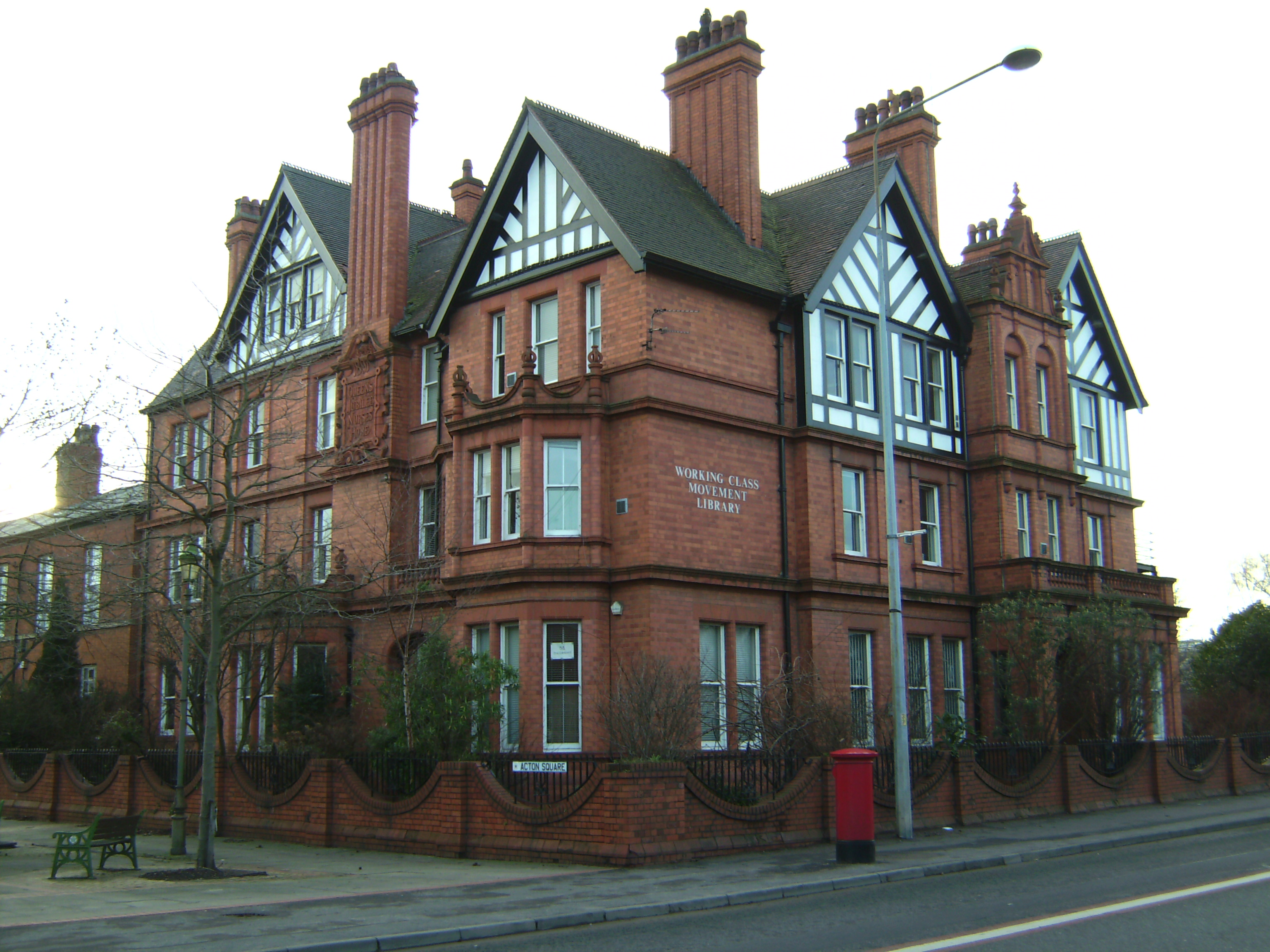
- Working Class Movement Library
- 53°29′03″N 2°16′23″W
- Location: England
- Scope: Working class
- Established: 1950s

Other information
- Website: www.wcml.org.uk

The Working Class Movement Library (WCML) is a collection of English language books, periodicals, pamphlets, archives and artefacts, relating to the development of the political and cultural institutions of the working class created by the Industrial Revolution, in Salford, Greater Manchester, England.

== History ==
In 1953, two bibliophiles, Eddie (Edmund) Frow and Ruth Haines, met at a Communist Party Summer School. In 1956, they set up home together and the merger of their book collections was the beginning of the Working Class Movement Library. They spent their spare time and money travelling around Britain, gathering new items for the collection. By 1960, the collection was being consulted by historians and academics, and they had attracted the support of other collectors of labour movement material. In 1964, they gained charitable trust status.

By the mid 1980s, the collection had filled their semi in Trafford. Salford City Council agreed to support the library and, in 1987, gave the WCML, and the Frows, a new home in a former nurses' home, Jubilee House, situated near the University of Salford. Designed and constructed in 1897 by Henry Lord (who also built the Peel Building opposite) it was built to celebrate Queen Victoria's diamond jubilee.

In 2007, the relationship changed when the trust took full responsibility for the housing and staffing of the collection with the council providing a lease of the building and an annual financial grant. The WCML is otherwise funded by trade union and individual subscription.

== Collection ==
The focus of the collection is the history of the political, industrial, social and cultural institutions of the working classes which were created by the Industrial Revolution.

The three main parts are the trade union movement, the co-operative movement and the political parties and campaigns of the left. The WCML houses 30,000 books as well as journals, newspapers, pamphlets, leaflets, banners, pottery, photographs, personal papers, archives of organisations, trade union emblems, badges and other artifacts.

The library has substantial and historically significant holdings on Thomas Paine and the radical movement of the 1790s, Peterloo Massacre, Chartism, ILP and Clarion movement, the campaign for women's suffrage, the General Strike, National Unemployed Workers' Movement, International Brigades, the 1970s radical press, the Miners' Strike of 1984-85 and much else. Whilst principally concerned with Britain, the library also has a major collection on Irish history from the late 18th century onwards, derived initially from the libraries of two historians; C. Desmond Greaves and T. A. Jackson.

The collection includes diverse cultural material including poetry, novels, prints, playscripts, songbooks and audio-visual material.

Since 1985, the WCML has been the official archive of the GMB union. It also has a large collection of material from the engineering and the various textile unions, especially the North west regional branches. It also holds varying amounts of material from dozens of other trade unions, old and new.

As well as holding local and national material from the mainstream UK co-operative movement, the WCML also holds archival material from local branches of the Co-operative guilds and periodicals of co-partnership and workers’ co-operative organisations.

The main political parties represented are the Labour Party and the Communist Party of Great Britain, of whom, the WCML holds large collections of pamphlets, periodicals and ephemera. Many of the smaller parties are represented by collections of similar material. Campaign groups are similarly represented, as well as collections of archive material from bodies as diverse as the National League of the Blind and Disabled, Manchester CND, Manchester Unity Theatre, Big Flame and the Jubilee Group.

In 2023 the WCML's archives were found to have contained evidence of British colonial atrocities committed during the Malayan Emergency, including photographs of severed heads related to the British Malayan headhunting scandal.

== See also ==
- International Institute of Social History
- Proletarian literature
- Women's Library

== External sources ==
- Official website
