= Roger Cole =

Irish politician & activist

Roger Cole was the founder and chairman of the Peace and Neutrality Alliance (PANA) until 2025. He was an active member of the Irish Labour Party which he joined in 1967 and stood in a local election in Dún Laoghaire. He resigned from the party following its compromising on the policy of Irish neutrality. He was also on the national executive of the Irish Campaign for Nuclear Disarmament.

He has campaigned against the Iraq War and the use by the US military of Shannon Airport. He has spoken on behalf of the PANA at Oireachtas committees, the National Forum on Europe.

He has campaigned against European Union (EU) militarisation and EU treaties such as the Treaty of Nice, which extend the EU powers into security and military matters.

In 2008 he represented PANA at the hearings of the sub-committee on Ireland's Future in the European Union set up in the aftermath of the 'no' vote in the first referendum on the Treaty of Lisbon.
