= Wolfe Tone Societies =

Irish republican group

The Wolfe Tone Societies
- Muintir Wolfe Tone
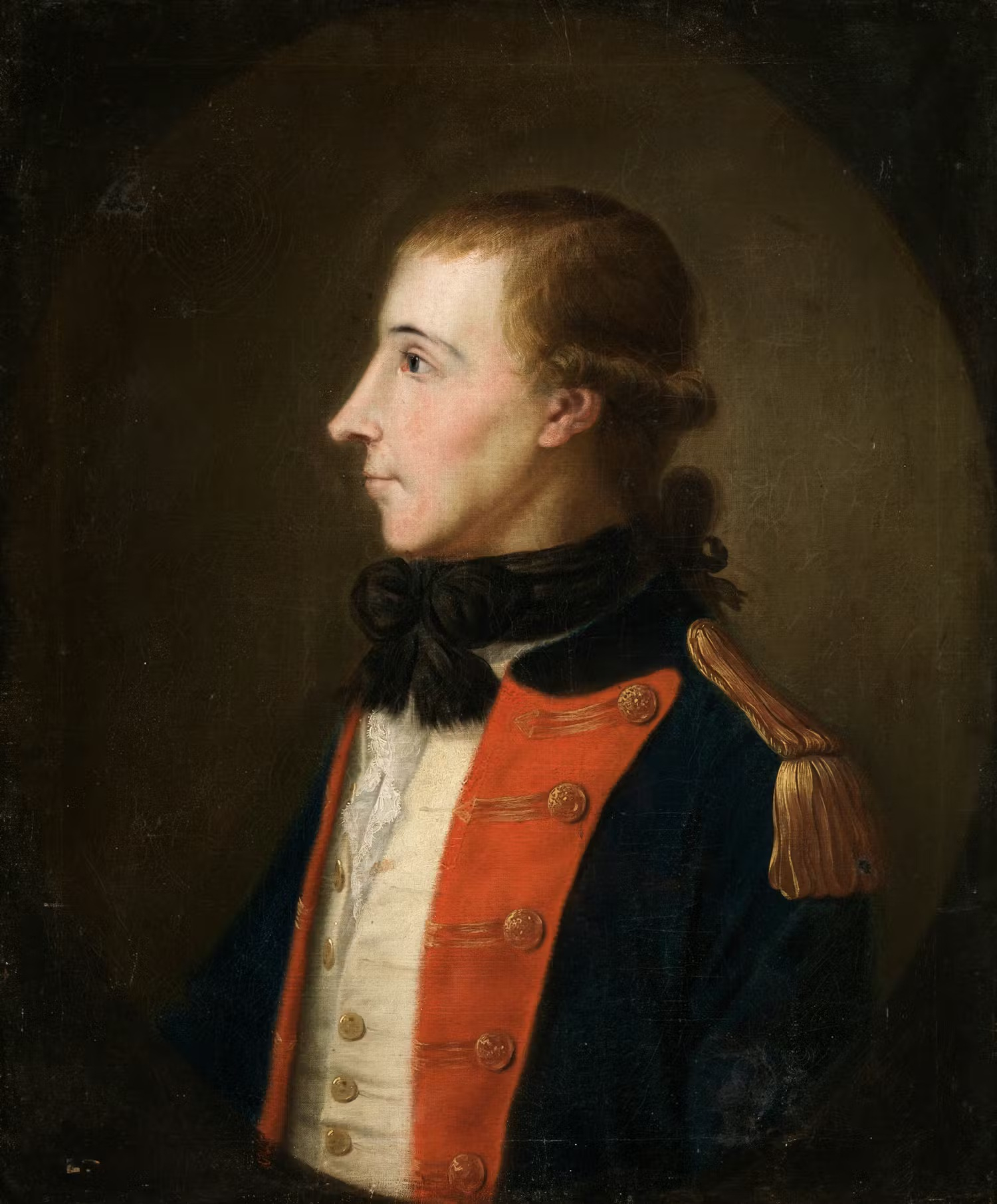
- Wolfe Tone, whom the societies are named after
- Abbreviation: WTS
- Formation: 1964
- Type: Irish political organisation
- Purpose: Creation of an all Ireland republic
- Headquarters: Dublin
- Region served: Ireland
- Members: By invitation
- Official language: English and Irish

The Wolfe Tone Societies (WTS; Irish: Muintir Wolfe Tone) are an Irish republican group whose chief objective is the establishment of a 'united Irish Republic.' It evolved from the commemorative Directories which the IRA helped set up in 1963 to mark the bicentenary of the 1763 birth of Wolfe Tone. In 1964 the Directories were dissolved and replaced with the Wolfe Tone Society. The publication of the Wolfe Tone Society from 1965 onward was called Tuairisc.

== History ==
In 1963 to celebrate the bi-centenary of Wolfe Tone's birth, Irish republicans formed the Wolfe Tone Bi-centenary Directories. Due to the support shown at the commemoration, it was decided at a meeting of the Directories in Dublin, July 1964, to disband the Directories and replace them with the "Muintir Wolfe Tone", or Wolfe Tone Society.

The WTS was opposed to the Republic of Ireland's entry into the European Economic Community and was involved with the organisation Irish Voice on Vietnam which protested the war.

One of the key intellectuals who joined the societies was Roy Johnston, of Protestant background. He sought to encourage Protestants in Northern Ireland to support the nationalist cause.

This organisation decided that it should focus on trying to "influence cultural and political trends in the country" and using democratic means to weaken the Unionist government of Northern Ireland. Its main bases of strength were in Belfast and Dublin.

In 1984, a Wolfe Tone Society was founded in London from the amalgamation of several London based Irish republican groups. It supports Sinn Féin, and holds major meetings and republican commemorations at the Camden Irish Centre in London, which are attended by Sinn Féin members.

== Objectives ==
Upon its creation, the Wolfe Tone Society declared that its aim was to further the creation of a united, independent, democratic Irish Republic as declared in the 1916 Proclamation of the Irish Republic. To achieve this it would focus on trying to convince the people of Ireland to support its creation, via meetings, publications and other means. To help promote its message, the organisation published a newsletter called Tuairisc.

== Involvement with NICRA ==
At a joint meeting of all the Wolfe Tone Societies which took place in the home of Kevin Agnew (republican solicitor) at Maghera, County Londonderry, August 1966, it was proposed that a civil rights campaign be started. The IRA's Chief of Staff Cathal Goulding was present and pledged support from his organisation. From this meeting another was arranged in Belfast on 29 January 1967 and the Northern Ireland Civil Rights Association was formed. The thirteen man committee which was formed included Fred Heatley and Jack Bennett from the Wolfe Tone Societies and Liam McMillan of the IRA.

== See also ==
- Connolly Association
