= Joseph Johnston (Irish politician) =

Irish academic, farmer, writer and politician (1890–1972)

Senator
- In office 14 August 1951 – 22 July 1954
- Constituency: Nominated by the Taoiseach
- In office 18 August 1944 – 21 April 1948
- In office 27 April 1938 – 8 September 1943
- Constituency: Dublin University

Personal details
- Born: 20 August 1890 County Tyrone, Ireland
- Died: 26 August 1972 (aged 82) Dublin, Ireland
- Party: Independent
- Spouse: Clara Wilson (m. 1914)
- Children: 2, including Roy
- Education: Trinity College Dublin; Lincoln College, Oxford

Joseph Johnston (20 August 1890 – 26 August 1972) was an Irish academic, farmer, writer and politician.

He was born in 1890 in Toomog townland, Castlecaulfield, County Tyrone, to John Johnston, a national school teacher, and Mary Geddis. He came from a Presbyterian family of Ulster-Scots descent.

He was educated at Dungannon Royal School (1902–1906), Trinity College Dublin (1906–1910, BA (Mod) in Classics) and Lincoln College, Oxford (1910–1912).

He supported Home Rule and was the author of Civil War in Ulster (1913) and The Nemesis of Economic Nationalism (1934). He became Professor of Applied Economics in Trinity College Dublin in 1939.

He was first elected to Seanad Éireann as an independent member in 1938 by the Dublin University constituency. He was re-elected to the 2nd and 3rd Seanad but lost his at the 1943 election. He was elected to the 5th Seanad in 1944 and lost his seat at the 1948 election. He was nominated by the Taoiseach to the 7th Seanad in 1951 and lost his seat at the 1954 election.

In 1914 he married Clara Wilson, a teacher from Ballymahon, County Longford; and they had two children. His son was the theoretical physicist Roy Johnston, a republican activist who was later a member of the Official Irish Republican Army. His daughter, Maureen Carmody, was a member of the National Executive of the Irish Labour Party for many years, and at one time an elected Labour member of Nenagh Town Council.

== Books ==
- 1913 – "Civil War in Ulster - Its Objects & Probable Results", Sealy, Byers and Walker, Dublin
- 1925 – "A Groundwork of Economics"
- 1934 – "The Nemesis of Economic Nationalism", P.S. King & Son, London
- 1951 – "Irish Agriculture in Transition", Hodges Figgis / Blackwell, Dublin
- 1962 – "Why Ireland Needs the Common Market", Mercier Press, Cork
- 1966 – "Irish Economic Headaches: A Diagnosis", Aisti Eireannachta
- 1970 – "Bishop Berkeley's Querist in Historical Perspective", Dundalgan Press, Dundalk
