= Ratification of the Treaty of Lisbon =

Ratification of the current EU system

Order in which EU member states ratified the treaty. Dates refer to the deposition of the ratification instruments with the government of Italy.

The ratification of the Treaty of Lisbon was officially completed by all member states of the European Union on 13 November 2009 when the Czech Republic deposited its instrument of ratification with the Italian government. The Lisbon Treaty came into force on the first day of the month following the deposition of the last instrument of ratification with the government of Italy, which was 1 December 2009.

Most states ratified the treaty in parliamentary processes. The Republic of Ireland was the only member state to hold a referendum on the subject. In a first vote held on 12 June 2008 (the first Lisbon referendum) the treaty was rejected; however a second vote was held on 2 October 2009 (the second Lisbon referendum) and the treaty was approved.

== At a glance ==
The table below shows the ratification progress in European Union member states. Hungary was the first member state where the treaty was approved by a national parliament on 17 December 2007. Note that the assent of the head of state represents the approval of the parliamentary procedure, while the deposition of the instrument of ratification refers to the last step of ratification, which might require a separate signature of the head of state on the instrument of ratification for it to be deposited. For the discussion of the specific legal situation in countries which have encountered obstacles in the ratification process, see relevant section below the table.

Signatory	Conclusion date	Institution	In favour	Against	AB	Deposited	Ref.
Austria	9 April 2008	National Council	151	27	5	13 May 2008	
Austria	24 April 2008	Federal Council	58	4	0	13 May 2008	
Austria	28 April 2008	Presidential Assent	Granted			13 May 2008	
Belgium	6 March 2008	Senate	48	8	1	15 October 2008	
Belgium	10 April 2008	Chamber of Representatives	116	11	7	15 October 2008	
Belgium	19 June 2008	Royal Assent	Granted			15 October 2008	
Belgium	14 May 2008	Walloon Parliament (regional) (community matters)	56	2	4	15 October 2008	
Belgium	14 May 2008	Walloon Parliament (regional) (community matters)	53	3	2	15 October 2008	
Belgium	19 May 2008	German-speaking Community	22	2	1	15 October 2008	
Belgium	20 May 2008	French Community	67	0	3	15 October 2008	
Belgium	27 June 2008	Brussels Regional Parliament	65	10	1	15 October 2008	
Belgium	27 June 2008	Brussels United Assembly	66	10	0	15 October 2008	
Belgium	10 July 2008	Flemish Parliament (regional) (community matters)	76	21	2	15 October 2008	
Belgium	10 July 2008	Flemish Parliament (regional) (community matters)	78	22	3	15 October 2008	
Belgium	11 July 2008	COCOF Assembly	52	5	0	15 October 2008	
Bulgaria	21 March 2008	National Assembly	195	15	30	28 April 2008	
Bulgaria	28 March 2008	Presidential Assent	Granted			28 April 2008	
Cyprus	3 July 2008	House of Representatives	31	17	1	26 August 2008	
Cyprus	19 July 2008	Presidential Assent	Granted			26 August 2008	
Czech Republic	18 February 2009	Chamber of Deputies	125	61	11	13 November 2009	
Czech Republic	6 May 2009	Senate	54	20	5	13 November 2009	
Czech Republic	3 November 2009	Presidential Assent	Granted			13 November 2009	
Denmark	24 April 2008	Parliament	90	25	0	29 May 2008	
Denmark	30 April 2008	Royal Assent	Granted			29 May 2008	
Estonia	11 June 2008	Riigikogu	91	1	9	23 September 2008	
Estonia	19 June 2008	Presidential Assent	Granted			23 September 2008	
Finland	11 June 2008	Parliament	151	27	21	30 September 2008	
Finland	12 September 2008	Presidential Assent	Granted			30 September 2008	
France	7 February 2008	National Assembly	336	52	22	14 February 2008	
France	7 February 2008	Senate	265	42	13	14 February 2008	
France	13 February 2008	Presidential Assent	Granted			14 February 2008	
Germany	24 April 2008	Bundestag	515	58	1	25 September 2009	
Germany	23 May 2008	Bundesrat	65	0	4	25 September 2009	
Germany	8 October 2008	Presidential Assent	Granted			25 September 2009	
Greece	11 June 2008	Parliament	250	42	8	12 August 2008	
Hungary	17 December 2007	National Assembly	325	5	14	6 February 2008	
Hungary	20 December 2007	Presidential Assent	Granted			6 February 2008	
Ireland	29 April 2008	Dáil Éireann (1st ref. bill – proposed const. amendment)	Passed			23 October 2009	
Ireland	9 May 2008	Senate (1st ref. bill – proposed const. amendment)	Passed			23 October 2009	
Ireland	12 June 2008	First Referendum^{[a]}	47%	53%	N/A	23 October 2009	
Ireland	8 July 2009	Dáil Éireann (2nd ref. bill – proposed const. amendment)	Passed			23 October 2009	
Ireland	9 July 2009	Senate (2nd ref. bill – proposed const. amendment)	Passed			23 October 2009	
Ireland	2 October 2009	Second Referendum^{[b]}	67%	33%	N/A	23 October 2009	
Ireland	15 October 2009	Presidential Assent (constitutional amendment)	Granted			23 October 2009	
Ireland	21 October 2009	Dáil Éireann (statute bill)	Passed			23 October 2009	
Ireland	22 October 2009	Senate (statute bill)	Passed			23 October 2009	
Ireland	27 October 2009	Presidential Assent (statute)	Granted			23 October 2009	
Italy	23 July 2008	Senate	286	0	0	8 August 2008	
Italy	31 July 2008	Chamber of Deputies	551	0	0	8 August 2008	
Italy	2 August 2008	Presidential Assent	Granted			8 August 2008	
Latvia	8 May 2008	Saeima	70	3	1	16 June 2008	
Latvia	28 May 2008	Presidential Assent	Granted			16 June 2008	
Lithuania	8 May 2008	Seimas	83	5	23	26 August 2008	
Lithuania	14 May 2008	Presidential Assent	Granted			26 August 2008	
Luxembourg	29 May 2008	Chamber of Deputies	47	1	3	21 July 2008	
Luxembourg	3 July 2008	Ducal Assent	Granted			21 July 2008	
Malta	29 January 2008	House of Representatives	65	0	0	6 February 2008	
Netherlands	5 June 2008	House of Representatives	111	39	0	11 September 2008	
Netherlands	8 July 2008	Senate	60	15	0	11 September 2008	
Netherlands	10 July 2008	Royal Assent	Granted			11 September 2008	
Poland	1 April 2008	Sejm	384	56	12	12 October 2009	
Poland	2 April 2008	Senate	74	17	6	12 October 2009	
Poland	9 April 2008	Presidential Assent	Granted			12 October 2009	
Portugal	23 April 2008	Assembly of the Republic	208	21	0	17 June 2008	
Portugal	9 May 2008	Presidential Assent	Granted			17 June 2008	
Romania	4 February 2008	Parliament	387	1	1	11 March 2008	
Romania	6 February 2008	Presidential Assent	Granted			11 March 2008	
Slovakia	10 April 2008	National Council	103	5	1	24 June 2008	
Slovakia	12 May 2008	Presidential Assent	Granted			24 June 2008	
Slovenia	29 January 2008	National Assembly	74	6	0	24 April 2008	
Slovenia	7 February 2008	Presidential Assent	Granted			24 April 2008	
Spain	26 June 2008	Congress of Deputies	322	6	2	8 October 2008	
Spain	15 July 2008	Senate	232	6	2	8 October 2008	
Spain	30 July 2008	Royal Assent	Granted			8 October 2008	
Sweden	20 November 2008	Parliament	243	39	13	10 December 2008	
United Kingdom	11 March 2008	House of Commons	346	206		16 July 2008	
United Kingdom	18 June 2008	House of Lords	Passed			16 July 2008	
United Kingdom	19 June 2008	Royal Assent	Granted			16 July 2008	
^aTurnout: 1,621,037 (53.13%); 6,171 (0.4%) spoilt; 752,451 (46.6%) for, 862,415 (53.4%) against.
^bTurnout: 1,816,098 (59.0%); 7,224 (0.4%) spoilt; 1,214,268 (67.1%) for, 594,606 (32.9%) against.

== Obstacles encountered ==
=== Czech Republic ===
Both houses of the Czech parliament have ratified the treaty, in February and May 2009. However, President Václav Klaus was opposed to the ratification of the Lisbon Treaty at that time. He called for the process to be brought to an end and stated that he was in "no hurry" to ratify the document. In September 2008, he had also stated that he would not sign the treaty until Ireland had ratified it.

Prior to that, President Klaus stated that he was awaiting the verdict of the Constitutional Court concerning a complaint submitted by senators against certain parts of the treaty. The Court dismissed this complaint on 26 November 2008. However, the senators proceeded to request the Constitutional Court to assess the treaty as a whole. On 29 September 2009 a group of Czech senators lodged a fresh complaint with the Constitutional Court. According to Czech Constitution, the treaty cannot be ratified until a ruling of the Constitutional Court is delivered.

Beside the constitutional challenge president Klaus, notwithstanding Czech parliament approval of the treaty, asked for an opt-out from the Charter of Fundamental Rights of the European Union. He said that, were the charter to gain full legal strength, it would jeopardise the Beneš decrees, and in particular the decree that confiscated, without giving compensation, the properties of Germans and Hungarians during the Second World War. These decrees are still part of the domestic law of both Czech Republic and Slovakia (the latter not having requested any exemption from the charter). President Klaus said that this opt out is therefore a necessary condition for him to sign the document. This argument had been already invoked by right-wing populists, when both countries were ready to accede to the European Union. In 2002 the EU Commission asked a legal opinion on compatibility of the decrees with the EU treaties. In the opinion it was argued that, were the Beneš decrees enacted today, they would breach EU treaties, but since they were enacted in 1945 their status would have been unaffected. The opinion quotes a sentence on this subject by the European Court of Human Rights in order to explain that, even if the EU, as the European Convention on Human Rights and Fundamental Freedoms, recognises the right to ownership as a fundamental right, the treaties cannot have a retroactive effect:

As regards this preliminary issue, the Court observes that the expropriation had been carried out by authorities of former Czechoslovakia in 1946, as confirmed by the Bratislava Administrative Court in 1951, that is before 3 September 1953, the entry into force of the Convention, and before 18 May 1954, the entry into force of Protocol No. 1. Accordingly, the Court is not competent ratione temporis to examine the circumstances of the expropriation or the continuing effects produced by it up to the present date

In the opinion it's also noted that, even if those clauses concerning property rights were enforceable, EU would not have any say on this as the Treaty establishing the European Community explicitly states (art. 295) that

This Treaty shall in no way prejudice the rules in Member States governing the system of property ownership.

This clause has been slightly reworded by the Lisbon Treaty in order to make it refer to both the TEU and TFEU treaties and is going to become article 345 of the TFEU.

On 2 October 2009, Ireland voted for the treaty in the second referendum, thereby removing one of Klaus's earlier objections to him signing the treaty. On 12 October 2009, the Czech government agreed to adopt Klaus's demand as its own assuming that the president would sign if they successfully negotiated the opt-out, and if the Constitutional Court ruled that the treaty was compatible with the Czech constitution. The opt-out was agreed by other member states of the EU in the European Council on 29 October 2009.

On 3 November 2009, the Czech Constitutional Court approved the treaty, clearing the way for President Klaus to sign it, which he did that afternoon. The Czech instrument of ratification was then deposited with the Italian Government on 13 November 2009.

=== Germany ===
Germany ratified the Lisbon Treaty in September 2009 after having placed on hold some fifteen months earlier. Both houses of the bicameral German parliament approved of the Treaty of Lisbon 24 April and 23 May 2008, and the German President had signed the ratification bill into law some months later.

However, ratification required another signature of the President in the formal instrument of ratification, which was withheld pending a ruling from the Constitutional Court on the treaty's compatibility with Germany's constitution. This followed a challenge launched by German Bundestag member Peter Gauweiler, a member of Bavaria's Christian Social Union (CSU) who, among others, claimed that the treaty was unconstitutional. Mr. Gauweiler had launched a similar challenge to the European Constitution in 2005 but after its failure, the Constitutional Court made no ruling on it.

The Constitutional Court held oral hearings on 10 and 11 February 2009. In its 30 June 2009 decision the Court stated that while the treaty was compatible with the Basic Law, an accompanying German statute, relating to powers of the German Parliament to supervise how the German government votes at Union level, granted insufficient powers to the German Parliament. Ratification of the treaty would require the stronger oversight powers. The 147-page-long ruling focuses on the structure of the European Union according to the Lisbon Treaty and its relationship with the Basic Law. It comes to the conclusion that the treaty does not create a European federal state (which would invalidate the Basic Law and require a referendum), that the structural democratic deficit of the EU institutions cannot be resolved in an association of sovereign national states (since it would break the principle of the equality of states), and that the substance of German state authority is protected.

The Bundestag held an extraordinary session on 26 August 2009 to examine a draft law on strengthening parliamentary oversight. On 8 September, the bill was passed by 446 votes to 46 with 2 abstentions. After the Bundesrat gave its unanimous approval on 18 September, the law was signed into force by the German President on 23 September 2009 and published in the official gazette on 24 September. The president signed the German instrument of ratification of the Treaty of Lisbon on 25 September 2009, after which it was deposited in Rome by the German Ambassador.

=== Ireland ===
Ireland ratified the Lisbon Treaty on 23 October 2009, after having initially put the whole process into doubt by rejecting the treaty in a referendum held in June 2008. Ireland was the only Member State to hold a referendum on the treaty and this initial referendum was a major reason why the treaty failed to come into force on 1 January 2009 as planned. A second referendum held on 2 October 2009 approved the treaty.

==== Background ====
A 1987 decision of the Supreme Court established that ratification by Ireland of any significant amendment to the Treaties of the European Union requires an amendment to the Constitution of Ireland. All Constitutional amendments require approval by referendum. As a consequence of this decision, Ireland has held referendums for every major European Union treaty since the Single European Act itself. The decision on whether to hold a referendum or not is a matter for the Irish government, acting on the unpublished advice of the Attorney-General. A decision not to hold a referendum would be reviewable by the Courts.

In June 2007, while the treaty was still in draft form, the government had already indicated that referendum would be held on the then Reform Treaty.

==== The first referendum ====
In the first referendum, all members from the three government parties supported the yes campaign, as did all the opposition parties with members in the Oireachtas, with the exception of Sinn Féin. The Green Party, while being a party in the government, did not officially take a line, having failed to reach a two-thirds majority either way at a party congress in January 2008, leaving members free to decide. Most Irish trade unions and business organisations also supported the yes campaign. Those campaigning for the no vote included political parties Republican Sinn Féin, Sinn Féin, lobby group Libertas, campaign group Cóir the People Before Profit Alliance and the Socialist Party.

The result of the referendum on 12 June 2008 was in opposition to the treaty, with 53.4% against the Treaty and 46.6% in favour, in a 53.1% turnout. A week later, the results of a Eurobarometer survey conducted hours after the vote were released, indicating why the electorate voted as they did. On 10 September, the government published the more in-depth research analysis on voters' stated reasons for voting yes or no: this concluded that the primary reason for rejection was "lack of knowledge/information/ understanding".

==== The second referendum ====
First plans for a revote appeared in July 2008: the term of the current European Commission would be extended until the Lisbon Treaty comes into force, member states would agree not to reduce the number of Commissioners and Ireland would hold another vote in September or October 2009 after receiving guarantees on abortion, taxation and military neutrality. On 12 December 2008 the Taoiseach, Brian Cowen confirmed that a second referendum would be held, after an EU leaders summit agreed to keep 1 Commissioner per member state and to incorporate legally binding guarantees on abortion, taxation and military neutrality in the Croatian Accession Treaty.

The second referendum on the treaty took place on 2 October 2009. The final result was 67.1% in favour to 32.9% against, with a turnout of 59%.

==== Completing ratification ====
The Twenty-Eighth Amendment of the Constitution was signed into law by President Mary McAleese on 15 October 2009. The Oireachtas then proceeded to enact a law to incorporate the treaty into Irish law. The domestic ratification having been completed, the Irish government lodged Ireland's instrument of ratification with the Italian government on 23 October 2009.

=== Poland ===
Shortly after Ireland's first referendum, Polish President Lech Kaczyński had said that it would have been pointless to give his final signature before a solution to the Irish no vote could be found. While the President had previously signed a parliamentary bill paving the way for Polish ratification, he had declined to sign the ratification instrument of the treaty. After the Irish electorate had approved the treaty in the second referendum, President Kaczyński then signed Poland's instrument of ratification on 10 October 2009. The instrument was lodged with the Italian government in Rome on 12 October 2009.

=== United Kingdom ===
Although the United Kingdom ratified the treaty in Parliament, this was not without some opposition. Broadly the governing Labour party supported the treaty, while the opposition Conservatives did not. The Liberal Democrats supported the treaty, while calling for a referendum on the UK's membership of the EU as a whole. Several 'Eurosceptic' MPs called for a referendum on the ratification of the treaty. Daniel Hannan pointed out that the Prime Minister, Tony Blair had twice promised a referendum on the matter, to which Blair replied that he had promised a referendum on the European Constitution rather than the Lisbon Treaty, which unlike the former was not a constitutional treaty. In early October 2007, the Commons' European Scrutiny Committee had found that the treaty was "substantially equivalent" to the rejected constitution. In mid October 2007 Bill Cash tabled an early day motion calling for a referendum on the treaty, with 47 supporting signatures. In January 2008 a group of 20 MPs of the ruling Labour government (including former ministers, Kate Hoey and Frank Field) tabled a wrecking amendment to the treaty ratification bill that called for a referendum on the treaty. They pointed out that all the major political parties had promised a referendum in the 2005 general election. Prime Minister Brown (who had replaced Blair on 27 June 2007) rejected calls for an election on the grounds that the treaty had significant differences from the constitution. Gisela Stuart called for a number of measures that would help avoid a crisis of legitimacy for the treaty: a referendum on ratification, the creation of a cabinet-level Europe minister who would be accountable for negotiations, and that the final ratification of the bill (and any further changes to changes to qualified majority voting (QMV) in the European parliament) to be a matter of primary legislation that would go through all the parliamentary stages rather than being whipped through. The same month, the Foreign Affairs Committee produced a report on the treaty which concluded that there was "no material difference between the provisions on foreign affairs" in the constitution and the treaty, and that the British government was underestimating and downplaying the significance of the proposed EU High Representative for Foreign Affairs and Security Policy and European External Action Service. At the Second Reading in the commons 362 voted in favour of Lisbon and 224 against. Three Conservative MPs voted in favour of the Treaty, while 18 Labour MPs voted against it. The amendment calling for a referendum was rejected although 29 Labour MPs and 13 Liberal Democrats voted with the Conservatives in favour, and three Conservatives voted against their party.

== Other votes ==
The European Parliament and one special territory of a member state carry out votes on the treaties. With respect to these territories a rejection could result in the treaty not applying to the territories in question, although this depends on the domestic laws applicable to the territories in question. The votes do not affect the overall ratification process and the treaty could come into force whether these entities approve the treaty or not.

Territory / body	Conclusion date	Institution	In favour	Against	AB	Ref.
(European Union) European Parliament	20 February 2008	European Parliament	525	115	29	
Åland Islands	25 November 2009	Parliament	24	6	0	

=== Åland Islands ===
On 25 November 2009 the Parliament of Åland Islands, an autonomous region in Finland, approved the Lisbon Treaty by a majority of 24 votes to six, well exceeding the required majority of two-thirds of the cast votes. A rejection of the Treaty by Åland would not have prevented the Treaty from coming into force.

The Islands' government had been looking to maintain the Islands' seat in the European Parliament and to gain the right to defend the Islands' implementation of EU law when they are challenged before the European Court of Justice, but only secured the latter. The European Parliamentary seat was lost in line with the general reduction of seats in the European Parliament.

== Court cases ==
During the course of the ratification procedure, the Lisbon Treaty was, and still is, a subject of court rulings which shape the interpretation of the Treaty in certain Member States, but have no legal bearing on the interpretation in other countries or on a European Union level.

=== Germany – Constitutional Court ===
During the German ratification procedure, the constitutionality of the treaty was challenged. On 30 June 2009, the Federal Constitutional Court of Germany issued an opinion regarding the treaty. The opinion stated that the Treaty was compatible with Germany's Basic Law. In addition, the opinion elaborated on the interpretation of the intergovernmental treaties underlying the European Union. The 147-page ruling focused on the structure of the European Union that will be established after the Lisbon Treaty goes effective and its relationship with the Basic Law. The opinion concludes that the Treaty does not create a European federal state (which would invalidate the Basic Law and require a referendum in Germany), that the structural democratic deficit of the EU institutions cannot be resolved in an association of sovereign national states (since it would break the principle of the equality of states), and that the substance of German national sovereignty is protected. While the Court considered the Treaty (and the German statute incorporating it into German Law and authorising the Treaty's ratification) compatible with the German Basic Law, it also found that an accompanying statute, that dealt with the German Parliament's powers of oversight over the votes cast by the representatives of the German Government within the EU's institutions granted insufficient powers to the German Parliament, in a manner incompatible with the Basic Law, so that Germany's ratification of the Treaty was to be stayed until the statute in question was amended so as to include provision recognising that in certain cases the German representative was only to cast a vote once the authorisation of the German Parliament was obtained. In addition, the judges reserved the right to overrule judgments by the European Court of Justice (ECJ) within Germany, if they should be judged in violation of the Basic Law. In accordance with the ruling, the German Parliament passed a bill amending the statute that dealt with the German Parliament's powers of oversight, and, once the increased control of the German Parliament over the actions of Germany's representatives was enshrined into law, the German President proceeded with the signing of the instrument of ratification.

=== Czech Republic – Constitutional Court ===
Two constitutional challenges have been lodged with the Czech Constitutional Court. In November 2008, the Constitutional Court concluded that "The Treaty of Lisbon amending the Treaty on European Union and Treaty on establishing the European Community and Charter of Fundamental Rights of the European Union are not in conflict with the constitutional order. [...] The EU integration process is not taking place in a radical way, which would lead to a "loss" of national sovereignty, but it is an evolutionary process." In September 2009, the Constitutional Court received a second constitutional challenge again alleging that the Lisbon Treaty is not compatible with the Czech Constitution. A public hearing has been scheduled for 27 October 2009 dealing with the second constitutional challenge. The Court announced that they had received all legal briefs required to make a decision as of 16 October 2009. The Czech constitutional court ruled that the Lisbon Treaty is compatible with the Czech constitution on 3 November 2009.

=== United Kingdom – High Court ===
A case was brought against the UK government by Stuart Wheeler. Mr Wheeler claimed the government was legally bound by an election promise to hold a referendum on the Lisbon Treaty. The government asserted that the promise was no longer valid as it was the Constitutional Treaty for which a referendum was promised, and that the Lisbon Treaty was fundamentally different in content and in nature (being an amending treaty rather than a constitution). The court could not find anything unlawful in the government's ratification of the treaty and the case was rejected. The case was appealed but was once more rejected. During the period of the trial the government refrained from fully ratifying the treaty. Bill Cash MP sought a judicial review in the UK High Court on 17 June 2008 on the grounds that the Irish referendum vote had made the Lisbon Treaty "incapable of ratification". The judge rejected the claim on the grounds that it was for parliament rather than the courts to decide whether the bill should be passed, and that Cash was trying to a "pursue a political agenda through the court".

=== Poland – Potential Constitutional Court Cases ===
On 24 November 2010 the Polish Constitutional Tribunal rejected a case brought by a group of senators challenging the national measures put in place in Poland in order to ratify the treaty.
