= Generation Yes =

- The logo of Generation Yes
- Abbreviation: GenYes
- Formation: 24 April 2009
- Type: Youth interest group
- Legal status: Active
- Purpose: Campaign for an Irish 'Yes' to the Lisbon Treaty
- Location: Ireland
- Website: www.generationyes.ie

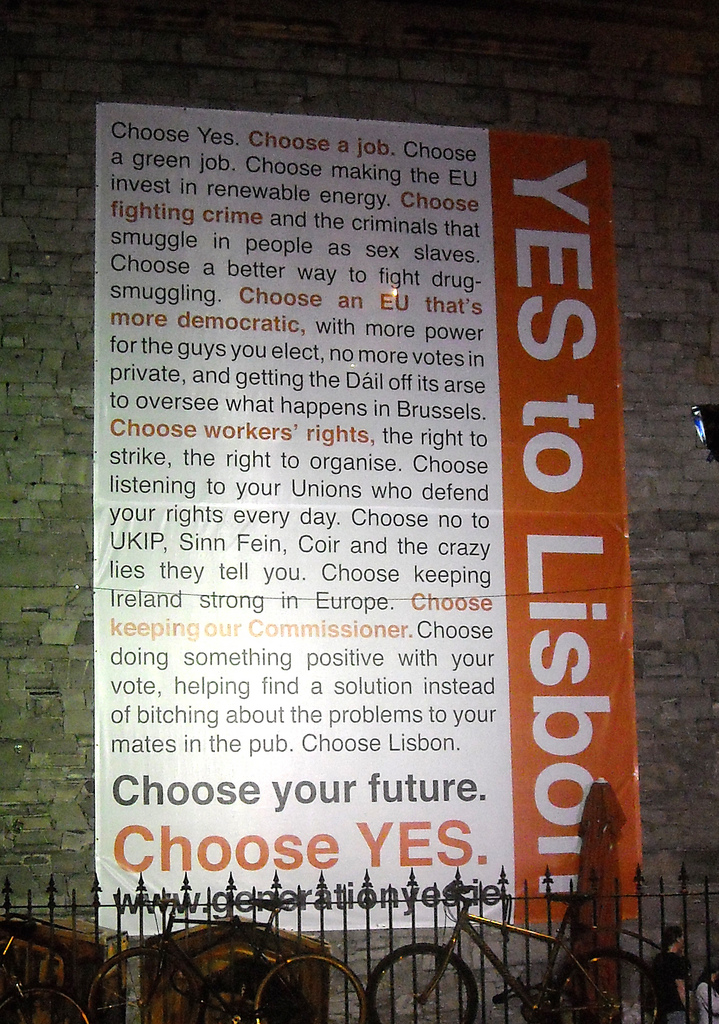
A two-storey Generation Yes poster in Dublin

Generation Yes was a campaign group in Ireland that was active in promoting the country's European Union (EU) membership and a 'Yes' vote in the campaign prior to the second referendum on the country's ratification of the Treaty of Lisbon, which was held on 2 October 2009.

The group was launched 24 April 2009 and was primarily made up of college students and graduates. Generation Yes had a stated aim to use social networking websites (such as Facebook and Twitter) to organise a "grassroots movement".

The organisation became inactive after the second Lisbon Treaty referendum.
