= Roy Johnston =

Irish philosopher and political activist (1929–2019)

- Born: Roy Harry William Johnston; 11 November 1929; Dublin, Ireland
- Died: 13 December 2019 (aged 90); St. Vincent's University Hospital, Dublin, Ireland
- Education: Trinity College Dublin; Dublin Institute for Advanced Studies
- Political party: Green Party (until 2019); Labour Party (?); Communist Party of Ireland (1972–1977); Official Sinn Féin (1969–1972); Sinn Féin (1963–1969); Communist Party of Great Britain (1960–1963); Irish Workers' League (1948–1960)
- Other political affiliations: Connolly Association; Wolfe Tone Societies
- Father: Joseph Johnston
- Military career
- Paramilitary: Irish Republican Army (1960s–1969); Official IRA (1969–1972)
- Conflicts: The Troubles

Roy Harry William Johnston (11 November 1929 – 13 December 2019) was an Irish theoretical physicist and republican political activist. He was a Marxist who as a member of the IRA in the 1960s argued for a National Liberation Strategy to unite the Catholic and Protestant working classes. He wrote extensively for such newspapers as The United Irishman and The Irish Times.

== Biography ==
His father was Joseph Johnston, a farmer, economist and historian, a fellow of Trinity College Dublin and a member of the Seanad Éireann on several occasions between 1938 and 1954. Joe Johnston was a Home Rule supporter who hailed from a small farming Ulster-Scots Presbyterian background in Tyrone.

Roy Johnston was born in Dublin in 1929. He was educated at St Columba's College, Rathfarnham, and at Trinity College Dublin (TCD). At graduated from TCD with honours in mathematics and physics in 1951. He then worked in the Paris École Polytechnique. In 1955 he completed a PhD thesis in cosmic physics, under the supervision of Cormac Ó Ceallaigh at the Dublin Institute for Advanced Studies. His PhD was called "A study of the unstable particles occurring in the cosmic radiation".

He worked in Aer Lingus as a systems analyst during the 60s and in the 1970s was head of the Applied Research & Consultancy Group in Trinity College Dublin's statistics programme. He made an oral presentation to the New Ireland Forum in 1984. He also wrote a bi-monthly science and technology column for the Irish Times.

== Political activities ==
Johnston was affiliated with various progressive and left-wing organisations throughout his life. As a student in Trinity he became interested in Marxism and was helped establish a small newspaper known as The Promethean. Alongside the TCD Fabian Society and other left-republicans, he helped establish the Irish Workers' League in 1948.

When his post-graduate research ended in 1960, he moved to England and joined the Connolly Association and the Communist Party of Great Britain. While in London he became acquainted with Desmond Greaves. He returned to Ireland in 1963, and, at the invitation of Cathal Goulding, involved himself with the Wolfe Tone Society in Dublin. He joined Sinn Féin and the IRA where he became its Director of Education sitting on the Army Executive.

He contributed many articles to its newspaper the United Irishman. He was a supporter of the republican movement's move to the left with Goulding and Tomás Mac Giolla, which subsequently led to a split with the Provisionals, remaining as a member of the Official IRA after the split.

However, he left in 1972 after the assassination of Northern Ireland Senator John Barnhill and joined the Communist Party of Ireland. He was expelled from the Communist Party in 1977 following his public criticism of the Soviet Union's treatment of writers and scientists. He was subsequently a member of the Labour Party, serving on their International Affairs Committee, and was a member of the Green Party at the time of his death.

== Personal life ==
In the mid-1960s Johnston had separated from his former wife, Máirín, and later entered a relationship with Janice Williams. In 1978, Johnston and Williams, led by future president Mary Robinson, took a case to European Court of Human Rights, claiming that the constitutional ban on divorce infringed their right to found a family. The European Court of Human Rights rejected the claim, but ordered that all children are entitled to equal treatment under Irish law, regardless of their parent's marital status. After the divorce ban was lifted following a 1995 referendum, the couple were married at a Quaker meeting house in 1998.

== Death ==
Johnston died on 13 December 2019, aged 90, at St. Vincent's University Hospital, Dublin.

== Publications ==
- Roy H. W. Johnston, Century of Endeavour: A Biographical and Autobiographical View of the Twentieth Century in Ireland (Carlow: Tyndall Publications, in association with Lilliput Press, Dublin, 2006).
- Century of Endeavour - Senator James G Douglas short biography of James G. Douglas, 1999.
- A study of the unstable particles occurring in the cosmic radiation PhD Thesis
