= Connolly Association =

Organization supporting Irish republicanism

The Connolly Association is an organisation based among Irish emigrants in Britain which supports the aims of Irish republicanism. It takes its name from James Connolly, a socialist republican, born in Edinburgh, Scotland and executed by the British Army for his involvement in the 1916 Easter Rising.

== History ==
It was formed in London in 1938 as the Connolly Club by members of the London branch of the Republican Congress, the Irish branch of the League Against Imperialism (a front for the Communist International) and the British-based Irish Self-Determination League. They claimed as a goal to be working for a united and independent Ireland and to provide a social and cultural centre for those promoting the teachings of James Connolly.

Throughout the 1950s and 1960s, the Connolly Association influenced trade unionists in Belfast who went on to establish the Northern Ireland Civil Rights Association in Northern Ireland. The Association continued to organise meetings throughout Britain and a number of new branches were established.

The Connolly Association has produced a newspaper since 1939, known first as Irish Freedom and then from 1945 as the Irish Democrat. It supports the Good Friday Agreement but continues to press for an end to the partition of Ireland and the unification of Northern Ireland with the Republic of Ireland.

== Members ==
Notable members of the Connolly Association included C. Desmond Greaves, Anthony Coughlan Roy Johnston, Luke Kelly, Eddie Dempsey, Paddy Roe McLaughlin, Bob Doyle, and Derry Kelleher.
