= People's Movement (Ireland) =

People's Movement Irish: Gluaiseacht an Phobail
- Type: Pressure group
- Headquarters: 25 Shanowen Crescent, Santry, Dublin 9, Ireland
- Chair/Cathaoirleach: Patricia McKenna
- Website: www.people.ie

The People's Movement (Irish: Gluaiseacht an Phobail) is an Irish pressure group which campaigns in support of Irish neutrality and against greater European Union integration and "militarisation". As well as campaigning against the 2008 Lisbon Treaty, it has campaigned against NATO, the war on Iraq, the use of Shannon Airport by the US military, and against Irish support for Ukraine in the Russo-Ukrainian war. The People's Movement is considered left-wing and opposes the institutions of the EU, arguing that they undermine workers' rights and lead to a "race to the bottom" between the workers of underdeveloped EU states. As of 2024, the group was included in the register of third parties maintained by the Standards in Public Office Commission.

== Sponsors ==
Supporters of the People's Movement have included artist Robert Ballagh, former TD Declan Bree, former MEP Patricia McKenna, Chris O'Leary, Bronwen Maher, Thomas Pringle, Catherine Connolly TD, and Irish-language broadcaster Seosamh Ó Cuaig. Tony Gregory was also a supporter of the group. As of 2008, McKenna was the organisation's chairperson.

== Lisbon Treaty ==
The group campaigned against the constitutional amendment to ratify the Treaty of Lisbon, stating that the treaty would increase Ireland's involvement in military commitments of the EU, compromise workers' rights and negatively impact Irish neutrality and sovereignty. The People's Movement reportedly argued that the Lisbon Treaty was a step towards a "more 'Corporate Europe'". During the campaign, the People's Movement queried whether the documentation issued by the Referendum Commission was impartial, stating that some leaflets were "designed to influence a Yes vote and were an abuse of taxpayers' money".

The People's Movement made submissions to the National Forum on Europe, which was set up in the aftermath of the rejection of the Lisbon Treaty in the first Lisbon referendum.

After the 'no' vote in the first Lisbon referendum in 2008, the People's Movement criticised the decision to re-run the referendum in 2009. In advance of the second Lisbon referendum, the group called for legislation to "prevent multinational corporations from trying to sway voters' opinions in future referenda" stating that it was inappropriate for such companies to spend millions on campaigning without "having to explain where the money comes from".

== Russo-Ukrainian war ==
Following the 2022 Russian invasion of Ukraine, the People's Movement opposed Irish and EU support for Ukraine, arguing that it undermines Irish neutrality. It condemned the Irish government for giving Ukraine mine clearing equipment, and condemned European countries for sending Ukraine military aid, saying that this was "to keep the war going". In its opinion, the Russian invasion was not driven by territorial expansion but by valid "security concerns" stemming from "Ukraine's deepening ties with NATO". It says that Russia is no threat to Europe and denies that Russia is waging a hybrid conflict. The People's Movement is against European rearmament and the EU's "growing militarisation" in response to Russia. It argues that the "Russian threat" will be used "to justify increasingly repressive and authoritarian policies".

== See also ==
- Euroscepticism in the Republic of Ireland
