= National Platform =

The National Platform for EU Research and Information Centre
- Formation: 1986
- Type: NGO, Pressure Group
- Headquarters: Dublin, Ireland
- Secretary: Anthony Coughlan
- Website: https://nationalplatform.wordpress.com/

The National Platform for EU Research and Information Centre shortened to National Platform is an Irish Eurosceptic lobby group which campaigns against greater European Union integration, and against a Federal superstate. It is a member of the EUDemocrats - Alliance for a Europe of Democracies.

Its motto is For a Europe of Independent Democratic Co-Operating Nation States and has used phrases like Citizens for a Europe of independent democratic co-operating countries, and against the development of a single EU State.

The secretary of the National Platform research and information group is Anthony Coughlan, senior lecturer Emeritus in social policy at Trinity College Dublin. The group has made submissions to various government forums on EU policy such as the National Forum on Europe Its members also issued press releases, submitted articles to various publications and contributed to debates on radio and television prior to the referendums on the Nice Treaty and for the Lisbon Treaty as well as sharing platforms with other like minded groupings.

On Friday 21 November 2008 National Platform head Anthony Couglan addressed the Oireachtas committee examining the fallout from the Lisbon NO vote. At the same time, they also pledged to campaign against a re-run of the referendum.
