= Peace and Neutrality Alliance =

Peace and Neutrality Alliance Comhaontas na Síochana is Neodrachta
- Formation: 1996
- Type: NGO
- Headquarters: 52 Silchester Park, Glenageary, County Dublin, Ireland
- Chairman: Roger Cole
- Website: www.pana.ie

The Peace and Neutrality Alliance (PANA, Irish: Comhaontas na Síochana is Neodrachta) is an Irish lobby group founded in 1996 which campaigns to preserve Irish neutrality.

It was involved in a number of campaigns such as those against aggression by Israel, against the Iraq War, against the use of Shannon Airport by the US military, and against the Republic of Ireland participating in the NATO-linked Western European Union (WEU). It campaigned against the European Union's EU Battlegroup and European Union treaties which it believed would compromise Irish neutrality such as the Amsterdam Treaty, the Nice Treaty and the Lisbon Treaty.

During the Russian invasion of Ukraine, PANA representatives joined a protest, led by the Communist Party of Ireland, against the Irish Defence Force providing weapons training to Ukrainian troops.

The chairperson and spokesperson for PANA is Roger Cole who is the public face of PANA, making contributions and submissions to various Oireachtas Committees such as the National Forum on Europe and the Committee on European Affairs.
