= Principle of consent =

Principle of the Northern Ireland Peace Process

Principle of consent is a term used in the context of the Northern Ireland peace process and is one of the key points of the Good Friday Agreement. The principle asserts both the legitimacy of the aspiration to a United Ireland and the legitimacy of the wish of the majority of the people of Northern Ireland to remain part of the United Kingdom. The doctrine also asserts the right of self-determination for the people of both jurisdictions in Ireland, Northern Ireland and the Republic of Ireland, without external interference, and only with the consensus of a majority of people in both polities.

The principle of consent is now accepted by all elected parties in Ireland. It is opposed by Republican Sinn Féin, the Irish Republican Socialist Party, Éirígí and many non-aligned Irish republicans.

Article 1 (ii) of the Good Friday Agreement says that the participants

recognise that it is for the people of the island of Ireland alone, by agreement between the two parts respectively and without external impediment, to exercise their right of self-determination on the basis of consent, freely and concurrently given, North and South, to bring about a united Ireland, if that is their wish, accepting that this right must be achieved and exercised with and subject to the agreement and consent of a majority of the people of Northern Ireland."
