= National Forum on Europe =

Former Irish discussion on the EU

National Forum on Europe Irish: Fóram Náisiúnta um an Eoraip
- Formation: 2001
- Dissolved: 2009
- Headquarters: Dublin, Ireland
- Chair/Cathaoirleach: Maurice Hayes
- Website: http://www.forumoneurope.ie

The National Forum on Europe (Irish: Fóram Náisiúnta um an Eoraip) was established by Taoiseach Bertie Ahern, TD, in the aftermath of the rejection of the Treaty of Nice by the Irish people in 2001. It exists to provide a forum for debate between senior politicians in Ireland and informed observers from abroad, to promote wider public participation and to inform the Irish public in a non-partisan and neutral manner about developments in the European Union.

== Working of the Forum ==
The operation of the Forum was based on the Forum for Peace and Reconciliation (FPR), with an independent secretariat headed by the Assistant Secretary from the Department of the Taoiseach, and membership consisted of representatives from the Oireachtas and nominees based on the 1997 general election.

The Observer Pillar of the Forum played a full part in all of its work. It included groups who had campaigned for and against the Nice Treaty and social partner organisations like IBEC, Irish Congress of Trade Unions and European Anti Poverty Network.

Representatives of political parties in Ireland and figures from the European Parliament addressed the forum, such as Peter Sutherland, Pat Cox, Jens Peter Bonde MEP, and David Byrne (former Commissioner).

A number of organisations made presentations and submissions, such as the Irish Farmers Association, National Platform, People's Movement, Institute for European Affairs, Peace and Neutrality Alliance, Social Democratic and Labour Party (SDLP), Irish Business and Employers Confederation (IBEC), Union representatives, and the representatives of the main churches in Ireland. The forum held sessions in Dublin Castle, but also a number of events and meetings around the country.

RTÉ Broadcaster Mr Derek Davis was the host at one of the sessions for the forum in Kilmainham.

== EU Constitution ==
The forum held discussions on the EU Constitution, and debates around Ireland, it also hosted events where politicians spoke in favour the Constitution. After the rejection by the people of France and the Netherlands, the forum or government did not support a referendum on the EU Constitution. A proposal in the Forum from the European Anti Poverty Network that there should be a cross-cutting clause requiring all EU institutions to take account of social inclusion in al policies was taken up by Taoiseach Bertie Ahern and, on the proposal of the Irish Government, became part of the Constitution and subsequently the Lisbon Treaty.

== Lisbon Treaty ==
The Forum was used in the buildup to the Lisbon Treaty and after the treaty's rejection, in it was used as a platform for discussion on the treaty.

== Closure of the Forum ==
In April 2009 the forum was closed by a taoiseach Brian Cowen, the decision was controversial and condemned by a variety of groups, particularly those who campaigned against the Lisbon treaty, such as the Peoples Movement, The Workers Party, and others such as the European Anti Poverty Network which saw it as a useful forum for debate on European issues not confined to referendums. Spokesperson for the pro-Lisbon Treaty Labour Party, Joe Costello, also condemned the closure of the forum, as did his party colleague Labour Party MEP Proinsias de Rossa.
