= Blasphemy law in the Republic of Ireland =

Former law

In Ireland, "publication or utterance of blasphemous matter", defamatory of any religion, was a criminal offence until 17 January 2020. It was a requirement of the 1937 Constitution until removed after a 2018 referendum. The common law offence of blasphemous libel, applicable only to Christianity and last prosecuted in 1855, (Note: An alleged instance in 1909 appears to relate not to a prosecution for blasphemy but to an ice rink operator's application to the Recorder of Dublin for renewal of its entertainment licence. It was alleged that a previous patron had skated while dressed as a parody of Jesus. The operator had objected to the costume and licence was granted. A 1957 prosecution for profanity, discussed in the Independence section of this article, assumed that "profanity" meant "obscenity" rather than "blasphemy".) was believed to fulfil the constitutional requirement until a 1999 ruling that it was incompatible with the constitution's guarantee of religious equality. The Defamation Act 2009 included a provision intended to fill the lacuna while being "virtually impossible" to enforce, and no prosecution was made under it. The 2009 statute increased controversy, with proponents of freedom of speech and freedom of religion arguing for amending the constitution. After the 2018 constitutional amendment, a separate bill to repeal the 2009 provision and residual references to blasphemy was enacted in 2019 by the Oireachtas (parliament) and came into force in 2020. The Prohibition of Incitement to Hatred Act 1989, which includes religion among the characteristics protected from incitement to hatred, remains in force.

== Early history ==
The legal system of Ireland grew out of the common law system of English law, and so Irish jurisprudence on blasphemy largely reflected that of England. The common law offence of blasphemous libel applied only to Christianity. Blasphemy could be committed by written or spoken words, by pictures or gestures. Profanity was generally regarded by legal scholars as synonymous with blasphemy. In 1328, Adam Duff O'Toole was burned alive in Dublin for alleged heresy and blasphemy. Initially tried under canon law, he was handed over to the civil power as a repeat offender. He was a member of the O'Toole family which launched Gaelic raids on the Anglo-Norman Pale, and modern historians regard the charges as politically motivated. In later times, the penalty for a first offence of blasphemous libel was an unlimited fine and imprisonment; for a second offence it was banishment. The established church was the Anglican Church of Ireland from 1536. Whether blasphemy could be committed against a denomination other than the established church was unclear; John Kelly suggested not.

An act of 1634–5 made it an offence to "profanely swear or curse"; this was replaced as "ineffectual" by the Profane Oaths Act 1695, which applied to profanity in the presence of a justice of the peace or mayor. It had fallen into disuse long before its repeal in 2007. During the Commonwealth and Protectorate, English religious laws, including on blasphemy, were applied to Ireland by the Rump Parliament in 1650 and the Third Protectorate Parliament in 1659. Six bills to suppress "blasphemy and profaneness" were introduced in the Parliament of Ireland between 1697 and 1713, but none was passed into law. An act of 1695 abolished the writ de heretico comburendo under which heretics were burned at the stake; Church of Ireland courts retained the power to punish "atheism, blasphemy, heresy, or schism, or other damnable doctrines and opinions ... by excommunication, deprivation, degradation, and other ecclesiastical censures, not extending to death".

There was a prosecution in the Kingdom of Ireland for blasphemous libel in 1703: Thomas Emlyn, a Unitarian minister, was convicted at Queen's Bench, fined £1,000 and imprisoned for one year for "blasphemously and maliciously" denying the Divinity of Christ. Emlyn later argued that his action was not blasphemy but heresy, which was not a crime in common law or Anglican canon law (though it was so in Catholic canon law). In 1840 Spencer Perceval shared this view. Emlyn remained in debtor's prison after his initial sentence until the fine was reduced to £70. Narcissus Marsh, the Church of Ireland Archbishop of Dublin, began a prosecution against a Presbyterian minister in Drogheda, which was dropped by the Dublin Castle administration sympathetic to dissenters. Other incidents that century did not result in prosecutions. In 1713, Peter Browne, bishop of Cork and Ross preached that loyal toasts to "the glorious, pious, and immortal memory" of King William were blasphemous. The same year, a convocation of the Church of Ireland recommended prosecution of Robert Molesworth for "an indictable profanation of the holy scriptures", after he had quoted Scripture in the course of an insult to their representatives at a viceregal levée. In 1756, Robert Clayton, Bishop of Clogher, questioned the Nicene Creed in a tract on religious tolerance; he was condemned by other bishops, but died before any prosecution for blasphemy was brought.

Two cases in the 1850s reflected Protestant mistrust of Catholicism in what had become the United Kingdom of Great Britain and Ireland. In 1852, John Syngean Bridgman, a Franciscan friar, was convicted at the assizes for County Mayo after burning an Authorized (King James) version of the New Testament. (Note: 'indicted for that he, not having the fear of God before his eyes, but contriving and intending to scandalize and vilify the true Protestant religion, as by law established within these realms, and to blaspheme the Holy Gospel of God and of our Lord and Saviour Jesus Christ, did... unlawfully, wickedly, and blasphemously, in the presence of divers liege subjects of our Queen, set fire to and partly consume by fire a copy of the Holy Gospel of God, being the authorized version thereof, appointed to be read in churches, called the New Testament; and then and there holding in his hands said New Testament, wickedly and blasphemously, in the presence and hearing of divers liege subjects, then and there pronounced and spoke with a loud voice, and published of and concerning said New Testament, as aforesaid, these profane and most blasphemous words, – that is to say, that "it (meaning the New Testament) is not the Word of God, but the Word of the Devil, and the Devil's Book – Luther's Bible, or your Heretic Bible" – to the great dishonour of Almighty God, and in contempt of the Protestant religion, and to the great scandal of the profession thereof, and against peace, &c') He viewed it as a souperist work inferior to the Catholic Douay–Rheims Bible. While the indictment described his actions as "in contempt of the Protestant religion", Judge Thomas Langlois Lefroy advised the jury "it is not the version of the Scriptures which will warrant the commission of such an offence" but rather "a want of reverence to the Scriptures". In 1855 at Kingstown, a King James Bible and New Testament were burned on a bonfire of "irreligious" books organised by Vladimir Petcherine, a Redemptorist Catholic priest. At Dublin Commission Court, he was acquitted of blasphemy (Note: 'The indictment charged, in the first count, that the traverser, "disregarding the laws and religion of the realm, and devising and intending to bring the Holy Scriptures of God, in the Authorized Version ... into disregard, hatred, and contempt, among the people of the United Kingdom, ... by causing a certain printed copy of said Scriptures ... to be contemptuously burnt, profanely and in the presence of divers of Her Majesty's subjects, and with a view to the destruction of said copy, did cause and procure to be thrown, and did cast and throw said copy into a certain fire until it was burnt, to the high displeasure of Almighty God, and the great disrespect, discredit, and dishonour of the religion established by law." There were seven other counts, one of which charged the traverser with intending to bring the United Churches of England and Ireland into contempt; another referred to the Holy Scriptures, irrespective of any particular version; and another charged the burning of a New Testament.') after claiming he had not intended to burn any Bibles. The case, described by as David Lawton as banal and petty, was prosecuted by the Attorney-General for Ireland and the Solicitor-General for Ireland after a complaint from Methodist minister Robert Wallace.

The Irish Church Act 1869 disestablished the Church of Ireland from 1871. In 2003 the UK House of Lords Committee on Religious Offences in England and Wales said it was "arguable that the crime [of blasphemy] did not survive the disestablishment". There were no subsequent prosecutions before the 1920–1925 partition of Ireland, or in Northern Ireland subsequently.

== Independence ==
Common law precedents persisted after the creation in 1922 of the Irish Free State, provided they were consistent with the 1922 Constitution, and later the current (1937) constitution. The last British prosecution until 1977 was Bowman v Secular Society Limited in 1917, in which the Law Lords ruled that the crime of blasphemy implied not just the substance ("denial of Christian doctrine") but also the manner ("vilification, ridicule, or irreverence"). The Irish Law Reform Commission's 1991 consultation paper on the crime of libel states, "if a case had arisen between Bowman in 1917 and 1937, it seems likely that an Irish court would have found the views in Bowman persuasive".

The 1937 Constitution as enacted stated "The publication or utterance of blasphemous, seditious or indecent matter is an offence which shall be punishable in accordance with law" (Note: Seditious publications are prohibited by the Offences against the State Act 1939; Indecent publications are prohibited under the Censorship of Publications Acts 1929 and 1946; the Indecent Advertisements Act 1889; and the Customs Consolidation Act 1876 (39 & 40 Vict. c. 36). The common law offences of seditious libel and obscene libel were abolished by the Defamation Act 2009.) and "The State acknowledges that the homage of public worship is due to Almighty God. It shall hold His Name in reverence, and shall respect and honour religion." The constitution also guaranteed certain rights "subject to public order and morality", including citizens' right "to express freely their convictions and opinions" and "[f]reedom of conscience and the free profession and practice of religion". In 1960, Paul O'Higgins criticised the 1937 constitution's blasphemy provision as introducing uncertainty, and possibly increased stricture, compared to the common law as developed to that date.

In Article 44.1 of the constitution as originally enacted, the state recognised "the special position of the Holy Catholic Apostolic and Roman Church as the guardian of the Faith professed by the great majority of the citizens"; and "also recognise[d] the Church of Ireland, the Presbyterian Church in Ireland, the Methodist Church in Ireland, the Religious Society of Friends in Ireland, as well as the Jewish Congregations and the other religious denominations existing in Ireland at the date of the coming into operation of this Constitution." These statements were removed after a 1972 referendum.

In 1956, two Jehovah's Witnesses proselytising in Clonlara were accosted by a mob led by the Catholic parish priest claiming their opposition to Trinitarianism was blasphemous. The priest and ten others were tried for assault and given probation, while the victims were bound over for three months on the legal ground their conduct was likely to lead to a breach of the peace. Both the defendants' counsel and the judge stated the Jehovah's Witnesses had been guilty of blasphemy, leading author Mark O'Brien to comment, "It could also be argued that the last sentence for blasphemy in Ireland was handed down, not in 1703 as often stated, but in 1956".

At the inaugural Dublin Theatre Festival in 1957, The Rose Tattoo was produced at the Pike Theatre Club, whose owner, Alan Simpson was then prosecuted for "producing for gain an indecent and profane performance", with obscenity later added to the charge. The play's detractors were concerned by its sexual content rather than religion. The Law Reform Commission's 1991 report comments "the equation of indecency and obscenity with profanity is probably misconceived. Although profane matter may sometimes be obscene or indecent, it is not necessarily so."

Section 13 of the Defamation Act, 1961 prescribed penalties for blasphemous libel, but did not define the offence, which was presumed still to be the common-law offence. The new maximum penalties were seven years' penal servitude, or two years' imprisonment and a £500 fine.

=== Corway v. Independent Newspapers ===
The only attempted prosecution since 1855 was in 1995–1999, when John Corway brought private prosecutions against three publications for coverage of the 1995 divorce referendum, specifically an article in Hot Press and two editorial cartoons, by Wendy Shea in the Irish Independent and Martyn Turner in The Irish Times. The original cases were dismissed because of the lack of a definition of the crime of blasphemy, with that against Independent Newspapers and editor Aengus Fanning appealed as a test case to the High Court. Shea's cartoon depicted the government parties' leaders snubbing a Catholic priest who was holding out a Communion wafer. Corway submitted, "As one professing and endeavouring to practise the Christian religion through membership of the Roman Catholic Church I have suffered offence and outrage by reason of the insult, ridicule and contempt shown towards the sacrament of the Eucharist as a result of the publication of the matter complained of herein and I am aware of other persons having also so suffered."

High Court Justice Hugh Geoghegan ruled against Corway on the basis that there was no actus reus, although there would have been mens rea. He also said he would not have given leave to prosecute as it would not serve the public interest. Corway appealed the decision to the Supreme Court, which upheld it. It ruled that the 1937 constitution had extinguished the common law offence, stating "It is difficult to see how the common law crime of blasphemy, related as it was to an established Church and an established religion, could survive in … a Constitution guaranteeing freedom of conscience, and the free profession and practice of religion." It refused to allow the prosecution, stating "in the absence of any legislative definition of the constitutional offence of blasphemy, it is impossible to say of what the offence of blasphemy consists … neither the actus reus nor the mens rea is clear. … In the absence of legislation and in the present uncertain state of the law the Court could not see its way to authorising the institution of a criminal prosecution."

== Defamation Act 2009 ==
The Law Reform Commission's 1991 Report opined that "there is no place for the offence of blasphemous libel in a society which respects freedom of speech". It said the Prohibition of Incitement to Hatred Act 1989 provided an adequate protection for outrage against religious belief. However, since banning blasphemy was mandated by the constitution, abolishing the offence would require a referendum. A referendum solely for that purpose "would rightly be seen as a time wasting and expensive exercise". The commission's report, therefore, outlined criteria for a statutory definition of blasphemy which could serve until such time as Article 40.6.1.i might be changed as part of a broader constitutional amendment. The 1996 report of the Oireachtas Constitution Review Group agreed that "The retention of the present constitutional offence of blasphemy is not appropriate."

The Defamation Act 2009 (introduced as the Defamation Bill 2006) implemented many of the recommendations of the commission's 1991 report. The bill as introduced omitted reference to blasphemy, pending a review by the Oireachtas Joint Committee on the Constitution. In March 2008, Brian Lenihan, the Minister for Justice, Equality and Law Reform, said:

In England and Wales blasphemy traditionally only consisted in the scandalising of the established church. It is probably the case in Ireland, with the enactment of the Article 44 provision in 1937, that blasphemy was extended to cover all of the denominations recognised in the constitution and that in 1972 it passed into a stage where it extended itself to all theistic religions, since all theistic religions are honoured by the Constitution, although Christianity is uniquely invoked in the preamble.

The Joint Committee on the Constitution's report on Article 40.6.1.i. was published in July 2008. The committee had discussed the case of comedian Tommy Tiernan, whose stand-up routine on The Late Late Show parodied the Gospels, offending many viewers. The Bar Council of Ireland made a presentation to the committee, pointing out that blasphemy and treason were the only crimes specifically mentioned in the constitution. Neville Cox stated:

When the English Parliament originally enacted blasphemy laws, it was with a view to appeasing an angry God who was irritated by despicable literature and who was causing plagues and fires to occur in London. That was the historical reason for the law. The Law Commission in England suggested that there were two types of situation where what had previously been characterised as blasphemous material might generate a public interest in its prohibition. The first is where there is incitement to hatred and the second is where there is simply an excessive offence to religious sensibilities. The term "blasphemy" does not relate to either of these. It is, therefore, a misdescription of a changed law.

The Oireachtas Committee's report concluded:

The reference itself has effectively been rendered a "dead letter" by virtue of the decision of the Supreme Court in Corway. Furthermore, the Committee is of the view that in a modern Constitution, blasphemy is not a phenomenon against which there should be an express constitutional prohibition.

On 20 May 2009 at the Bill's committee stage, section 36, dealing with blasphemy was introduced by Minister for Justice Dermot Ahern as an amendment. Section 36 defined a new indictable offence of "Publication or utterance of blasphemous matter", which carried a maximum fine of €25,000. The offence consisted of uttering material "grossly abusive or insulting in relation to matters held sacred by any religion", when the intent and result was "outrage among a substantial number of the adherents of that religion". A defence was permitted for work of "genuine literary, artistic, political, scientific, or academic value". (Note: Jurist Katherine A.E. Jacob suggested that, since religious expression was not a listed defence, the statute might criminalise practice of one religion if that were outrageous to adherents of another.) "Religion" excluded profit-driven organisations or those using "oppressive psychological manipulation". Upon conviction under section 36, a court warrant could authorise the Garda Síochána (police) to enter premises to search for and seize any copies of the blasphemous material. Only the Director of Public Prosecutions (DPP) could instigate proceedings, as distinct from private prosecutions like Corway. Ahern said:

I am … puzzled as to the hysterical and incorrect reaction whipped up by some media reporters and commentators on this point. … I as the responsible Minister, and we as legislators, do not have the luxury of pursuing a "do nothing" approach while we wait for an opportune moment to move a constitutional amendment.

Mary McAleese, the President of Ireland at the time, convened the Council of State to discuss whether the Bill should be referred to the Supreme Court to test its constitutionality; she decided not to do so. The bill became law when McAleese signed it on 23 July 2009, and came into force on 1 January 2010.

=== Implementation ===
By 9 May 2017 no prosecution had ever been brought under the 2009 Act.

The advocacy group Atheist Ireland responded to the enactment by announcing the formation of the "Church of Dermotology" (named after Dermot Ahern). On the date on which the law came into effect, it published a series of potentially blasphemous quotations on its website and vowed to challenge any resulting legal action.

After the 2015 Charlie Hebdo shooting, Ali Selim of the Islamic Cultural Centre of Ireland suggested that the blasphemy provision of the Defamation Act 2009 should be applied to any media outlet reproducing cartoons depicting Muhammad as part of the "Je suis Charlie" campaign. In 2016, the Irish Secretary of the National Union of Journalists said that Charlie Hebdo would have been in "clear breach" of the Irish law.

In 2016, Neville Cox said, "My view is the 2009 Act fulfilled a constitutional obligation on the crime of blasphemy, but skilfully rendered the law completely unenforceable. I am not saying that was the intention". Dermot Ahern commented in 2017, "We implemented the crime but made it in a way that it would be virtually impossible to prosecute."

On 6 May 2017, the Irish Independent said an unnamed man informed them that the Garda were looking into a formal complaint of blasphemy he had made against Stephen Fry and RTÉ after Fry's 2015 appearance on RTÉ's religion programme The Meaning of Life. (Note: When host Gay Byrne asked what he would say to God at the "pearly gates", Fry responded, "I'd say 'Bone cancer in children, what's that about?' How dare you create a world in which there is such misery that is not our fault. It's not right. It's utterly, utterly evil. Why should I respect a capricious, mean-minded, stupid god who creates a world which is so full of injustice and pain? … the god who created this universe, if it was created by god, is quite clearly a maniac, an utter maniac, totally selfish.") The complainant said that he was not personally offended by Fry's comments. Unofficial Garda sources said that a file would be sent to the DPP, who was "highly unlikely" to prosecute. On 8 May 2017, the Garda said they would not proceed with an investigation as no injured parties had come forward and they were "unable to find a substantial number of outraged people". Fry later said he had "discovered from the person who actually framed the blasphemy law that it was deliberately framed in order to be unworkable." He thought it was a "wonderfully Irish solution" to the problem of outdated legislation that could not be repealed without a referendum that they "just engineer[ed] it a little so that it became preposterous."

== Removal from the Constitution ==
After the 2009 Act, Atheist Ireland said that it would be holding a series of public meetings to launch a campaign for secular constitutional reform. In March 2010, Ahern's press officer said the minister might ask the cabinet to hold a referendum to remove the reference to blasphemy from the Constitution in autumn 2010, at the same time tentatively planned for a referendum on an amendment relating to children's rights. Asked about this in the Dáil (lower house), Ahern did not offer any commitment, but said:

the programme for Government did indicate the possibility of referendums on a number of issues … If we were to have a number of referendums on one day, it would be appropriate to put to the people a question on the section of the Constitution relating to blasphemous and seditious libel.

In the event, no referendums were held before the dissolution of the 30th Dáil in January 2011. Before the ensuing general election, Atheist Ireland asked parties "Do you believe that blasphemy should be a criminal offence?" Fine Gael, Sinn Féin, and the Workers' Party said no, while Labour and the Green Party supported a referendum to remove the constitutional requirement. After the election, the Fine Gael–Labour coalition's programme for government promised a Constitutional Convention to discuss potential amendments, including "Removing blasphemy from the Constitution".

The convention was established in December 2012, and received submissions on the blasphemy issue from various groups and individuals, mostly in favour of abolition. The Irish Council of Churches, a coalition of the main Christian churches in Ireland, described the provision as "largely obsolete". The Convention considered the issue at its seventh plenary session on 2–3 November 2013. Several submitters were invited to make presentations at the meeting. There were expert presentations from university academics Neville Cox, Eoin O'Dell, and Maeve Cooke; the Knights of Saint Columbanus, the Islamic Cultural Centre of Ireland, and an NUIG PhD student argued in favour of retention; while Atheist Ireland, the Humanist Association of Ireland, and the Irish Council of Civil Liberties argued for its removal. Convention members voted 61–38 against retaining the existing constitutional prohibition of blasphemy; 53–38 in favour of replacing it with a prohibition of "incitement to religious hatred"; and 50–49 against having a statutory prohibition of blasphemy. If a statutory prohibition were used, members voted 81–11 in favour of a new provision rather than the 2009 Act.

In October 2014, Minister of State at the Department of Justice and Equality Aodhán Ó Ríordáin gave the official government response to the convention's report on blasphemy, announcing that it had decided to hold a referendum on the issue. In January 2015, Taoiseach Enda Kenny said there would not be a referendum on the issue before the next general election, which took place in February 2016. He said that two referendums were already being held in 2015, on same-sex marriage and reducing the age of candidacy for the presidency, and any more might distract voters from focusing on the issues.

After the election on 26 February 2016, protracted negotiations led to a Fine Gael–independent government on 7 May with confidence and supply support from Fianna Fáil. The government programme published on 11 May included a commitment to holding a referendum on blasphemy. After the May 2017 story about Stephen Fry, a Department of Justice and Equality spokesperson said that it had undertaken "preliminary consultations and preparatory work" on the amendment, with future scheduling to be decided by the government. Simon Harris, the Minister for Health, said the law at the time was "silly, a little embarrassing and needs to be changed". In the Dáil Gerry Adams asked Enda Kenny whether a referendum would be held in 2017; Kenny replied "There are quite a number of referenda backed up, and they take time". In September 2017, new Taoiseach Leo Varadkar gave an "indicative timeline" for planned referendums, with that on blasphemy in October 2018, simultaneous with the presidential election. In June 2018, the Government approved the holding of the referendum. The Thirty-seventh Amendment of the Constitution (Repeal of offence of publication or utterance of blasphemous matter) Bill was formally introduced to the Dáil on 13 July. On 28 August the date of the Presidential election and hence the referendum was fixed for 26 October. The amendment bill passed all stages in the Dáil on 18 September and the Seanad on 20 September. The referendum was approved by 64.85% of voters on a turnout of 43.79%. The amendment was signed into law on 27 November 2018 by the re-elected president, Michael D. Higgins.

== Removal from statute law ==
When the referendum result was announced, the Minister for Justice and Equality Charles Flanagan welcomed it and introduced legislation to repeal the relevant sections of the 2009 Act. On 20 December 2018, Flanagan published the general scheme of the "Repeal of Offence of Publication or Utterance of Blasphemous Matter Bill" for introduction in 2019. The bill would repeal sections 36 and 37 of the 2009 Act, remove blasphemy as grounds for banning a film, and "for the avoidance of doubt" explicitly abolish the common law offence of blasphemous libel. On 17 January 2019 the Dáil business committee waived the requirement for pre-legislative scrutiny of the bill. The Blasphemy (Abolition of Offences and Related Matters) Bill 2019 was formally introduced in the Seanad on 17 July 2019, and passed there unamended on 25 September. Its second reading in the Dáil was on 5–6 November. The Dáil Select Committee on Justice and Equality considered it on 4 December and made no amendments; it passed remaining Dáil stages on 11 December. It was signed into law by President Higgins on 21 December as the Blasphemy (Abolition of Offences and Related Matters) Act 2019. Flanagan signed a ministerial order on 16 January 2020 to commence the Act on the following day.

== Other laws and regulations ==
The Censorship of Films Act 1923 mandated the Chief Censor to prohibit a film or scene "unfit for general exhibition in public by reason of its being indecent, obscene or blasphemous". A 1925 Amendment extended the power to ban advertisements for films. These powers were retained in the most recent legislation of 2008, but the "blasphemous" criterion was deleted by the Blasphemy (Abolition of Offences and Related Matters) Act 2019. Of films banned since 1968, ten included "blasphemy, sacrilege or heresy" among the grounds, most recently in 1981. The Censor (now called the Director of Film Classification) has wide discretion in interpreting the statutory criteria. Early Censors banned any depiction of Jesus or communion hosts. Monty Python's Life of Brian was banned by Frank Hall in 1980 for being blasphemous; when resubmitted in 1987 it was passed uncut by his successor Sheamus Smith. The Censor's bans on The Masque of the Red Death (1964, for "blasphemy and horror") and Audrey Rose (1977, for "heresy") were overturned by the Appeals Board, which includes both a Catholic and Protestant clergyman. The Censorship of Films Acts apply only to cinema films; the Video Recordings Act 1989 did not include blasphemy as grounds for prohibition, but does include "incitement of religious hatred" as grounds for censorship or an outright ban (refusal of certification). In September 2016, reports that the lack of an Irish release for My Scientology Movie was due to the blasphemy laws were dismissed by The Irish Times as media flim-flam; Neville Cox said the laws were "of no relevance" to the situation.

The Censorship of Publications Acts (1929 and 1946) did not include blasphemy among possible grounds for banning, which were indecency, obscenity, promotion of "unnatural" contraception or abortion, and (in the case of periodicals) excessive focus on crime. In the debate on the 1946 Bill, Senator Louis O'Dea suggested adding blasphemy as a criterion. According to historian Anthony Keating, the Catholic Truth Society of Ireland influenced the Censorship of Publications Board to search for grounds to ban books it considered blasphemous, as in the case of The Adventures of the Black Girl in Her Search for God, ostensibly banned for indecency in 1932.

The Advertising Standards Authority for Ireland's voluntary code of conduct requires advertising to "avoid causing offence on grounds of … religion" and not to "ridicule or exploit religious beliefs, symbols, rites or practices". A 2005 Paddy Power poster, parodying Leonardo da Vinci's The Last Supper with Jesus and the apostles in a casino, was withdrawn for breaching the religion guidelines as well as "taste and decency". The Broadcasting Authority of Ireland's 2015 code of programme standards requires material to "show due respect for religious views, images, practices and beliefs". In 2021 RTÉ apologised for a Waterford Whispers News satirical report, on the arrest of God for raping of Mary, which the Catholic Archbishop of Armagh called "deeply offensive and blasphemous".

The crime of sacrilege was defined, under the Larceny Act 1861 and the Larceny Act 1916, as breaking and entering a church ("place of divine worship") and committing any felony. Sacrilege was the charge used to prosecute theft from church poor boxes. It was abolished as a separate crime by the Criminal Law (Jurisdiction) Act 1976 whereby several types of breaking and entering were replaced by the single crime of burglary.

== See also ==
- Religion in Ireland
