= Right of Irish expatriates to vote =

Ineligibility of nearly all Irish expatriates to vote in nearly all Irish elections

At most elections in the Republic of Ireland the electoral register is based on residential address, and the only non-resident voters are those serving abroad on government business; this includes Irish diplomats and their spouses, and Defence Forces and Garda Síochána personnel but not their spouses. An exception is in elections to the Seanad (upper house) for which graduates voting in the university constituencies (National University of Ireland and Dublin University) may be nonresident. A government bill introduced in 2019 proposed allowing non-resident citizens to vote in presidential elections.

Expatriates intending to return to Ireland within eighteen months may retain their Irish address for electoral purposes, but must be present to vote in person. Maintenance of the electoral register is inefficient and emigrants often remain listed years after leaving; some return specifically to vote, which is technically illegal but difficult to enforce. There is no requirement of residency for public representatives. Martin McGuinness, as a Derry resident, could not vote in the 2011 presidential election, in which he came third out of five candidates. Chicago resident Billy Lawless was a Taoiseach's nominee to the 25th Seanad.

== Debate on extending the franchise ==
Since the 1990s there have been proposals to allow emigrants to vote in elections to the Dáil (lower house) or Seanad, generally via a dedicated (single transferable vote multi-seat) constituency. Groups established by economic emigrants leaving the 1980s recession have advocated for change. A related issue is a proposed right of people in Northern Ireland to vote in the Republic. Arguments in favour of expatriates voting include the economic and cultural importance of the Irish diaspora and the potential benefits of increasing its engagement with the state, and a moral debt owed to reluctant emigrants. Arguments against include the possibility of the emigrant vote swamping residents, and that emigrants' views may conflict with residents'. Of 70 million nonresidents claiming Irish ancestry, 3 million have Irish citizenship including 1 million who have lived in Ireland. Most proposals would enfranchise only the subset of this 1 million who left Ireland a limited time before. The number is still large relative to a resident population (including children) of 4.8 million; however, Iseult Honohan suggests that swamping could be prevented by making emigrants vote in a dedicated emigrants' constituency rather than in the constituency of their last Irish residence, so that expatriates would have lower apportionment than residents. The Irish government is responsible to the Dáil, so proposals to allow expatriates to vote for the Seanad or the figurehead office of President would provide symbolic inclusion without jeopardising government stability.

== Oireachtas elections ==
The Oireachtas (parliament) committee on the constitution considered the matter in 2002; it recommended no extension of the franchise, but that among the senators nominated by the Taoiseach (prime minister) should be "a person or persons with an awareness of emigrant issues". In 2014, the Oireachtas joint committee on European Union (EU) affairs considered a European Commission communication on "the consequences of disenfranchisement of Union citizens exercising their right to free movement", and recommended that Irish citizens abroad should have the right to vote in Dáil elections. In 2015, a report on reform of the Seanad commissioned by the Taoiseach Enda Kenny recommended that senators on vocational panels should be directly rather than indirectly elected, from an electorate extended "to Irish citizens in Northern Ireland and to holders of Irish passports living overseas".

== Presidential elections ==
The Constitutional Convention in 2013 recommended allowing expatriate citizens to vote in presidential elections; In 2017 the government agreed to this, published a position paper listing seven options for eligibility criteria and associated implementation measures, and promised a constitutional referendum on whichever option it would select, to be held alongside the 2019 local election. In February 2019, the government decided that, due to the urgency of dealing with Brexit, the referendum would be postponed; it also agreed that the proposal would be "an extension of the franchise to all citizens resident outside the State, including citizens resident in Northern Ireland". The resulting bill was introduced in the Dáil in September 2019, but lapsed in 2024 having never being debated.

== EU elections ==
The 2021 report of the Seanad committee on Brexit noted a democratic deficit created by the Northern Ireland Protocol, which leaves Northern Ireland subject to some EU rules despite no longer participating in EU decision-making. Among the mitigations suggested in the report was allowing Irish citizens resident in Northern Ireland to vote in elections to the European Parliament.

== See also ==
- History of the franchise in Ireland
