= Vladimir Pecherin =

Russian writer (1807–1885)

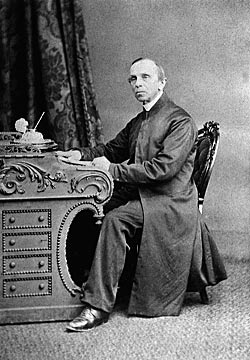
Father Vladimir Pecherin

Vladimir Sergeyevich Pecherin (Russian: Владимир Сергеевич Печерин; 27 June 1807 – 28 April 1885) was a Russian nihilist, Romantic poet, and Classicist, who later became a Roman Catholic priest in 19th-century Ireland.

A member of the hereditary Russian nobility from Odessa, Pecherin grew up witnessing his father regularly beating both the servants and his own mother. After he was an adult, he completed his education at State expense at the Friedrich Wilhelm Royal University in the Kingdom of Prussia and then briefly served as a professor of Classics at the Imperial Moscow University. Then he unexpectedly left both his faculty position and the Russian Empire to become a dissident intellectual who rejected and denounced both Christianity and Tsarism.

After several years of living in Europe, Pecherin shocked everyone who knew him by converting from Atheism to the Roman Catholic Church. He eventually was ordained to the priesthood and spent the remainder of his life ministering to the poorest of the poor in the tenement slums and hospitals of Dublin, Ireland.

As a former Westernizer, Fr. Pecherin's autobiographical notes and in his letters to other Russians provide a historical context to the ideological evolution of the Russian intelligentsia during the 1860s and 1870s. Pecherin's writings present the Russian Zeitgeist of the period artistically. In his native Russia, where Pecherin remained, "a powerful symbol of anti-Russian sentiment and religious apostasy", he is believed to have inspired many characters in Russian literature, particularly in the novels of Mikhail Lermontov and Fyodor Dostoevsky.

== Early years ==
Pecherin was born in the town of Velyka Dymerka in the Russian Empire (modern-day Ukraine) on 27 June 1807. His parents were Sergei Panteleimonovich Pecherin, a senior officer in the Imperial Russian Army, and Pelegaya Petrovna Simonovskaya, the descendant of a family from the hereditary Russian nobility long resident in Moscow.

He was raised in the Russian Orthodox Church and, as a child, was presented inside the city's Orthodox Cathedral to the governor general and founder of Odessa, French Royalist émigré Armand Emmanuel de Vignerot du Plessis, 5th Duke of Richelieu.

Like many other Russian aristocrats of his generation, Pechorin was educated on his ancestral estate by a foreign-born tutor, who instilled in him an enthusiasm for the ideas of the French Age of Enlightenment and German Romanticism, "which contrasted dramatically with the despotic atmosphere of his family and of Russian society in general." He began studying the French language at the age of ten, and swiftly developed an enthusiasm for French literature, particularly Les Aventures de Télémaque of François Fénelon, the verse dramas of Jean Racine, and the novels of Stéphanie de Genlis. His favourite works of German literature as a child were the writings of Johann Hübner and August Kotzebue.

When Pecherin was still a very young child, the family's German-born doctor predicted, "This child will become either a poet or an actor." Pecherin later recalled about this prophecy, "Indeed I was a poet, not in verse, but in real life. Under the influence of lofty inspiration I have conceived and constructed the long poem of my life and, according to all the rules of art, I have maintained its complete unity."

Pecherin later recalled, "In the good, old Russian manner, my father, of course, whipped our servants. I can still hear their wailing as they were lashed in the stables. Mother would send me to my father to plead for Vaska or Yashka. I would weep, implore, kiss my father's hands, and sometimes mitigate the severity of their Russian fate... But my mother was also a victim herself... Once she took me by the hand, led me to the corner, made me kneel next to her before the icon of St Nicholas, and said in tears: 'Oh, St Nicholas! You see how unjustly we are treated!' In the meanwhile, a party was going on in the next room... But the queen of this merrymaking was not my mother, but another woman... This other woman was the wife of our Colonel, a sly and beautiful Polish woman with whom my father was carrying on an almost open affair." Pecherin later recalled that evening as the moment when he first began to think of fleeing from the Russian Empire.

== University career and defection ==
In 1829, Pecherin began taking classes at the University of St Petersburg. During the Golden Age of Russian Poetry, his literary translations of Greek poetry into Russian and manuscripts of his original poetry circulated among his university companions. The very high quality of both his translations and original verse led to an offer in March 1833 from the Minister of National Education, Sergey Uvarov. Acting on behalf of Tsar Nicholas I, Uvarov invited Pecherin to continue his studies as a Classicist at State expense at Friedrich Wilhelm Royal University in Berlin. When he returned to Russia in 1835, he was appointed librarian and professor of the Greek language and the Classics at the Imperial Moscow University. Before joining the faculty in January 1836, Pecherin completed and defended his doctoral thesis at the University of St Petersburg in order to fully qualify for his promised position.

Despite Uvarov' practice of covertly promoting academic freedom, Pecherin had been attracted since his childhood to the moral and religious ideology of Utopian socialism, sharply opposed the official government ideology of Orthodoxy, Autocracy, and Nationality, and felt stifled in an Empire marked by pervasive censorship and Tsarist secret police surveillance. After only one term, Pecherin decided to quietly leave Russia to openly embrace Russian nihilism and creative freedom in Western Europe.

Although he had officially remained a member, Pecherin was also offended by the traditional subservience of the Russian Orthodox Church to both Tsarist autocracy and control by the State. After using the pretext of visiting Berlin for personal reasons, Pecherin was granted official permission to travel abroad and left Russia on 23 June 1836. He arrived in Basel, moving to Zürich on 11 December 1836, and to Liège, Belgium, in c. June 1837.

In a letter explaining his defection to the authorities, Pecherin stated that he would never return to a country among whose inhabitants it was impossible to find the imprint of their Creator. Due both to his decision to permanently leave his country for political reasons and send a letter to the Tsar explaining why, the 1836 emigration of Vladimir Pecherin is sometimes compared with the defection to the Polish–Lithuanian Commonwealth by Prince Andrey Kurbsky during the reign of Ivan the Terrible.

== Emigration ==
After four years as part of the literary bohemia of Europe and at times being reduced to complete poverty, Pecherin unexpectedly converted to Roman Catholicism on 19 July 1840. His former patron, Tsar Nicholas I, was enraged by the news. As was the common practice of the Tsarist autocracy at the time for Russians who converted to Catholicism while abroad, the Tsar stripped Pecherin of his citizenship, noble status, and inheritance, and strictly forbade him from ever returning to the Russian Empire.

He became a member of the Redemptorists whose mission was to work among the poorest of the poor. He lived in a monastery in Clapham, near London and later in Ireland, where his skills as an orator attracted large audiences and made Pecherin's sermons very popular.

In 1855, he was the last person to be prosecuted for blasphemy in Ireland. The trial, which was a major public event, took place at Kingstown. Fr. Pecherin, who had been spearheading a campaign against immoral literature, stood accused of burning copies of the Protestant King James Bible in the same bonfire with immoral and pornographic literature upon Guy Fawkes Day. In a violation of journalistic standards and ethics, the Times of London made no pretense of concealing the blatant anti-Catholic bias in its coverage of the trial. Despite many witnesses and much to the outrage of many Protestant groups, the jury returned a verdict of not proven. Fr. Pecherin's acquittal was raucously celebrated by the impoverished Irish Catholic population of Dublin and praised in a specially composed street ballad and early Irish rebel song. In Pecherin's native Russia, however, the nuances related to the case were not understood and Pecherin's guilt was simply taken as a given and further added to his continuing legend. His ultimate acquittal was accordingly not even reported by the equally anti-Catholic Russian media.

In 1856, Fr. John Henry Newman invited Pecherin to preach a Saint Patrick's Day sermon in the chapel of the newly founded University College Dublin. An attendee later recalled how Pecherin used the sermon to covertly express his own Irish nationalist and anti-colonialist views, "One year... the famous Russian missionary, Father Petcherine, appeared in the pulpit and preached the panegyric of the Saint in a truly wonderful address. This foreigner, with a command in English which the most practiced orators might have envied, not only analyzed the character and motives of St. Patrick, and described his career with extraordinary and spirit-stirring power, but also evinced a pathetic sympathy - the interest of the heart - with the woeful history of the people whose cause for religious sake he had made his own, which moved not a few of those present to tears."

== Later life ==
Like many other Russian intellectuals of his generation, Pecherin was very enthusiastic and hopeful about the political reforms instituted in the Russian Empire following the coronation of Tsar Alexander II, and most particularly by the 1861 abolition of serfdom in Russia.

In 1862, after 20 years of service as a missionary, Pecherin was permitted leave the Redemptorists at his own request. To save him from destitution, Pecherin was assigned by the Archbishop of Dublin, Cardinal Paul Cullen, who respected Pecherin despite their differing views about the Syllabus of Errors, as chaplain to the Sisters of Mercy at the Mater Misericordiae Hospital. There, while living in obscurity as a virtual hermit, Pecherin spent the last 23 years of his life.

In 1863, the extreme Slavophile Moscow Gazette argued that Pecherin's return to Russia might be welcome, but only if he would agree to facilitate better relations between the Government and the Catholic clergy, who were alleged to have singlehandedly instigated the recent nationalist January Uprising against Tsarist rule in Congress Poland. In reality, Pecherin's conversion to Catholicism had not altered his support for self-determination of the Polish people and "found the idea of being a loyal subject of the Russian Tsar preposterous. However, he also wanted to affirm his loyalty to the values that were dear to his generation and to present his own version of his life story." The incident accordingly inspired him to write his memoirs, Apologia pro vita mea (Notes from Beyond the Tomb).

In response, Pecherin reached out to his former St Petersburg University friend Feodor Chizhov and began making arrangements to write and publish his memoirs.

As his explanation why, Pecherin wrote, "I happen to lead two lives: one here, the other in Russia. I cannot get rid of Russia. I belong to her with the very essence of my being. It is thirty years since I have settled here - yet, I'm still a stranger. My spirit and my dreams wander not hither - at least, not in the setting to which I was chained by fatal necessity. I don't care if anyone remembers me here when I die, but Russia is another matter. Oh, how much, how much I wish to leave some memory of myself on Russian soil! At least one printed page, witnessing the existence of a certain Vladimir Sergeev Pecherin. That page would be my gravestone saying: 'Here lie the heart and mind of V. Pecherin.'"

Despite his self-deprecating humour alleging a lack of ability in the Russian language, Pecherin skillfully emulated the prose style of other writers. As he described the era of his childhood, he expressed himself in the historical prose of Alexander Pushkin. As he described his early adulthood, he did so in the writing styles of Ivan Turgenev and Nikolai Karamzin. Later events were described in an idiom similar to Fyodor Dostoevsky and even Anton Chekhov, who was still a schoolboy.

During his time in Dublin, Pecherin had remained harshly critical of Tsarism, but had also grown to oppose certain policies of Pope Pius IX. During an era of increasingly bitter struggle between Liberal Catholicism, Secularism, and Caesaropapism on the one hand with Traditionalist Catholicism and Ultramontanism on the other, the Pope's crusade against certain elements of Classical Liberalism and the natural sciences struck Pecherin as excessive and left him feeling deeply disillusioned. These are the reasons for the bitterness sometimes expressed in his memoirs; in which either Pecherin or his editor Chizhov, "described his years in the Redemptorist Order as spiritual slumber and his entire Catholic experience as a fatal error of judgment."

There were other reasons for this, however, according to Pecherin scholar Natalia Pervukhina-Kamyshnikova, "Aware of the incomprehensibility of his conversion and his readers' insatiable curiosity about his motivation, he tried to minimize the significance of his Catholic experience in their eyes. That accounts for the playful, almost frivolous tone in his description of the most important step he took in life. He puts the blame for his decision on the aesthetic enchantment he found in Lamennais and George Sand. He explains his conversion as inspired by visions of a poetic wilderness and by literary images that drew him inexorably to monastic life."

After carefully editing excerpts from Pecherin's many letters to him between 1865 and 1877 into a book length memoir, Chizhov fought to get the volume published. Despite Chizhov's best efforts to edit the draft into an acceptable form to the government during an era of the limited relaxation of censorship in the Russian Empire under Tsar Alexander, "political considerations" still prevented the publication of Pecherin's memoirs. Chizhov died in 1877, without having seen them appear in print.

== Death and legacy ==
After a three-month long illness, Vladimir Pecherin died in the boarding house of Miss G. M. Furlong, 47 Lower Dominick St., Dublin on 17/29 April 1885. His obituary in the Freeman's Journal commented, "Father Pecherin will be deeply regretted for his great piety, unassuming demeanor, gentleness of disposition, and charity." He was buried first at Glasnevin Cemetery, where a tombstone was erected for him by the Sisters of Mercy.

Despite his departure from the Order, on 1 May 1991, Pecherin's body was re-exhumed and reburied in the Redemptorist plot at Deansgrange Cemetery in Dun Laoghaire.

Pecherin's memoirs remained unpublished until his eventual biographer, Mikhail Gershenzon, acquired the manuscript while researching its author and began publishing limited excerpts in 1910. The first complete edition was edited for publication by Gershenzon and finally released in a limited run in 1932. It did not become widely available to be read by the Russian people until the 1980s, when Mikhail Gorbachev's Glasnost and Perestroika reforms preceded the collapse of the Soviet Union. Thus, ironically, the Russian people were denied access to Pecherin's memoirs until more than a century after his death.

== Quotes ==
- "How sweet it is to hate one's fatherland and eagerly anticipate its annihilation, and to see in the destruction of one's fatherland the dawn of worldwide rebirth."

== In popular culture ==
- According to Pecherin scholar Natalia Pervukhina-Kamyshnikova, Mikhail Lermontov is believed to have named the Byronic hero of his 1840 novel A Hero of Our Time "Grigory Alexandrovich Pechorin" in a deliberate reference to Vladimir Pecherin.
- According to Pecherin scholar Natalia Pervukhina-Kamyshnikova, Fyodor Dostoevsky, as a passionate believer in Tsarism, Russian Orthodoxy, Caesaropapism, Slavophilism, anti-Semitism, and anti-Catholicism, considered Pecherin, "to be the emblematic figure of a Westerniser, a person who had lost his identity and human worth by severing his Russian roots." It is accordingly believed that Dostoevsky's anti-materialist "one secluded thinker" in The Idiot is an allusion to Pecherin. The early life and Romantic poetry of Stepan Trofimovoch Verkhovensky in Dostoevsky's The Possessed are also a deliberate satire of Pecherin. Furthermore, Stepan Trofimovich's "wicked parody" in the same novel of Pecherin's The Triumph of Death, is now "better known than the original poem." The Grand Inquisitor in The Brothers Karamazov, "uses arguments that Dostoevsky attributed to Catholics like Pecherin."
- In the movie The Russia House, starring Sean Connery, Klaus Maria Brandauer's character "Dante," a Russian scientist, quotes Pecherin.
