= Constitutional Convention (Ireland) =

Constitutional convention in Ireland

The Convention on the Constitution (Irish: An Coinbhinsiún ar an mBunreacht) was established in Ireland in 2012 to discuss proposed amendments to the Constitution of Ireland. More commonly called simply the Constitutional Convention, it met for the first time 1 December 2012 and sat until 31 March 2014. It had 100 members: a chairman; 29 members of the Oireachtas (parliament); four representatives of Northern Ireland political parties; and 66 randomly selected citizens of Ireland.

The convention was mandated to consider eight specified issues, and also selected two others to discuss. The government was not obliged to proceed with any amendment proposal, but committed to respond formally to each recommendation and debate it in the Oireachtas. As of December 2018, the government had formally responded to all nine of the convention's reports, and put three of its proposals to referendum. Two of those referendums took place on 22 May 2015: to mandate legal same-sex marriage and to reduce the age of eligibility for the presidency from 35 to 21. The former was accepted, and the latter rejected. A third referendum was passed on 26 October 2018 to remove the offence of blasphemy from the Constitution.

== Operation ==
The convention was established pursuant to resolutions in each house of the Oireachtas in June 2012. It was to meet on at least eight Saturdays over the course of a year. The inaugural meeting was on 1 December 2012 at Dublin Castle, and working sessions begin in late January 2013, with later sessions being held elsewhere in the state and in Northern Ireland.

The plenary sessions were open to the public, and streamed live. The convention's secretariat was called the Constitutional Convention Office, led by civil servants from the Department of the Taoiseach. The Secretary was Art O’Leary, previously Director of Committees, Information and Communications of the Oireachtas, who was on secondment to the Department of the Taoiseach. The research was led by the Academic and Legal Research Group, made up of David Farrell, Jane Suiter, Eoin O'Malley, Clodagh Harris and Lia O'Hegarty.

=== Agenda ===
The establishing resolution set the following agenda items:

1. reducing the presidential term of office to five years and aligning it with the local and European elections;
2. reducing the voting age to 17;
3. review of the Dáil electoral system;
4. giving citizens resident outside the State the right to vote in presidential elections at Irish embassies, or otherwise;
5. provision for same-sex marriage;
6. amending the clause on the role of women in the home and encouraging greater participation of women in public life;
7. increasing the participation of women in politics;
8. removal of the offence of blasphemy from the Constitution; and
9. following completion of the above reports, such other relevant constitutional amendments that may be recommended by it

The first two items were to be considered first, with recommendations due for report to the Oireachtas within two months of the convention's first meeting. The other specified issues were considered in turn until November 2013, and two other issues were then chosen, Dáil reform and Economic, social and cultural rights.

== Members ==
=== Chair ===
The chairman was appointed by the Government. Finding a suitable willing candidate took longer than expected. On 24 October 2012, it was announced that the chairman would be Tom Arnold, an economist who is chief executive of the charity Concern and chair of the trust which runs The Irish Times newspaper. Arnold is being paid for his work, and was to step down from his role at Concern in 2013 as the convention's workload increases.

In January 2014, Arnold addressed the Seanad on the convention's work to date. He listed the principles under which it operated as openness, fairness, equality of voice, efficiency, and collegiality.

=== Citizens ===
The 66 random citizens were chosen by a polling company to reflect the age, regional, and gender balance of the electorate. For each of the 66, a similar-profile alternate was also selected.

In the case of citizen members, only their names and county or Dublin postal district were published, rather than their full postal address. This was agreed after the polling company, Behaviour and Attitudes, reported that some of those selected were worried about being "bombarded" by lobbyists and pressure groups.

=== Legislators ===
Thirty-three places were reserved for members of the legislatures of the Republic of Ireland (Oireachtas) and Northern Ireland (Northern Ireland Assembly). Six parties in the Northern Ireland Assembly were each invited to send one representative. Four accepted, while the Democratic Unionist Party and Ulster Unionist Party declined, regarding the convention as internal to the Republic. The remaining places, 29 in the event, were divided between the Oireachtas groups so as to be "impartially representative of the Houses". Each Oireachtas group is represented, roughly proportional to their total numbers in both houses (Dáil and Seanad), including the Dáil technical group and the Seanad independent group. Sinn Féin has a joint delegation from both legislatures.

| Assembly | Party / group | Number | Members | Alternates | Ref |
|---|---|---|---|---|---|
| Oireachtas | Fine Gael | 12 | Charles Flanagan TD (head); James Bannon TD; Jerry Buttimer TD; Regina Doherty TD; Frances Fitzgerald TD; Terence Flanagan TD; Tom Hayes TD; Derek Keating TD; Tony McLoughlin TD; Michelle Mulherin TD; Senator Catherine Noone; Mary Mitchell O'Connor TD | Senator Colm Burke; Senator Paul Bradford; Senator Jim D'Arcy; Pat Deering TD; Alan Farrell TD; Senator Fidelma Healy Eames; Seán Kyne TD; Joe O'Reilly TD | |
| Oireachtas | Labour Party | 7 | Senator Ivana Bacik (head); Ciara Conway TD; Robert Dowds TD; Anne Ferris TD; Senator Aideen Hayden; John Lyons TD; Michael McCarthy TD | | |
| Oireachtas | Fianna Fáil | 4 | Seán Ó Fearghaíl TD; Séamus Kirk TD; Senator Averil Power; Senator Thomas Byrne | | |
| Oireachtas | Dáil technical group | 2 | Catherine Murphy TD; Maureen O'Sullivan TD | | |
| Oireachtas | Seanad independents | 2 | Senator Jillian van Turnhout; Senator Rónán Mullen | | |
| Oireachtas + Northern Ireland Assembly | Sinn Féin | 3 (2 + 1) | Gerry Adams TD; Mary Lou McDonald TD; Martin McGuinness MLA | Aengus Ó Snodaigh TD; Senator David Cullinane; Caoimhghín Ó Caoláin TD; Senator Kathryn Reilly; Barry McElduff MLA; Caitríona Ruane MLA. | |
| Northern Ireland Assembly | SDLP | 1 | Alban Maginness MLA | | |
| Northern Ireland Assembly | Alliance Party | 1 | Stewart Dickson MLA | | |
| Northern Ireland Assembly | Green Party in Northern Ireland | 1 | Steven Agnew MLA | | |

== Background ==
In the 2007–2011 Oireachtas (30th Dáil and 23rd Seanad) the joint committee on the constitution produced a report on the electoral system which recommended that the issue be discussed by a "Citizens' Assembly on Electoral Reform" and sketched out the structure of such an assembly.

=== Manifestos and Programme for Government ===
Proposals for constitutional reform were in the main parties' manifestos for the February 2011 general election. Fine Gael proposed a "Constitution Day" series of referendums and a citizens' assembly on electoral reform. Fianna Fáil also proposed a citizen's assembly. The Labour Party, Sinn Féin, and the Green Party each proposed the drafting of new constitution, respectively by a 90-member "constitutional convention", an "all-Ireland Constitutional Forum", and a "Citizens Assembly". Fine Gael and Labour produced a Programme for Government in March and formed a coalition government. The coalition's Programme said:

We will establish a Constitutional Convention to consider comprehensive constitutional reform, with a brief to consider, as a whole or in sub-groups, and report within 12 months on the following:

- Review of our Dáil electoral system.
- Reducing the presidential term to five years and aligning it with the local and European elections
- Provision for same-sex marriage.
- Amending the clause on women in the home and encourage greater participation of women in public life.
- Removing blasphemy from the Constitution
- Possible reduction of the voting age.
- Other relevant constitutional amendments that may be recommended by the Convention.

Fianna Fáil leader Micheál Martin commented "The Constitutional Convention appears to be Fine Gael's Citizen's Assembly but with Labour's preferred title". Noel Whelan wrote in The Irish Times in 2012, "The programme for government did not define what it meant by a constitutional convention, did not detail its likely composition and was silent on what would happen to any recommendations."

Also in 2011, a group of academics set up a participatory democracy initiative called "We the Citizens", which in June 2011 ran a trial citizens' assembly of 100 randomly selected citizens at the Royal Hospital Kilmainham.

=== Establishment ===
In February 2012, the government proposed that the convention would have 100 members, as follows:

- a chairperson "of exceptional ability with a high degree of public acceptability"
- 66 ordinary citizens selected at random from the electoral register (on the model of a citizens' assembly)
- one member nominated by each political party in Northern Ireland. The precise number would depend on which parties accepted the offer: some Irish republican parties have practised abstentionism, while Ulster unionist parties did not accept invitatations to previous Dublin fora — the New Ireland Forum (1983–84) and the Forum for Peace and Reconciliation (1994–2002).
- the balance from members of the Oireachtas proportion to party strength.

The plan did not envisage direct participation by social partners or other interest groups, but they would be able to make written submissions. The government also proposed that the first two items for consideration would be lowering the voting age from 18 to 17, and reducing the President's term of office.

Issues upon which the government had already committed to holding a referendum would not be within the convention's remit.

Fianna Fáil, Sinn Féin and the Dáil technical group discussed the proposals in March. They reported back to the government in April, and the government responded in June. In regard to acting on the convention's recommendations, the response stated:

The Government will commit to giving a public response, through the Oireachtas, to each recommendation from the Convention within four months. It will arrange for a debate in the Oireachtas on that response in each case. In the event the Government accepts a recommendation that the Constitution be amended, the Government's public response will include a timeframe for the holding of a referendum.

On 19 June 2012, the Seanad passed a Fianna Fáil motion that the government's proposal to abolish the Seanad should be referred to the convention. Three Labour senators (John Kelly, James Heffernan, and Denis Landy) defied the party whip to support the motion.

A resolution establishing the Convention in the names of the Taoiseach and Tánaiste was passed in the Dáil on 10 July 2012: A similar resolution was passed by the Seanad on 12 July. Originally one hour was allocated for its debate; senators spent 90 minutes debating procedural motions about whether to extend the time to two hours, after which the resolution was passed without debate.

The Electoral (Amendment) Act 2012 was introduced to allow the electoral register to be used to provide the names of the citizen members of the convention. While existing law allows the register to be used for any "statutory purpose", the convention was not established by statute. The bill passed all stages in the Dáil on 11 July and in the Seanad on 12 July, and signed by the President on 18 July.

Although in June the Taoiseach envisaged the Convention beginning work in September, he said in October there was a delay because of the difficulty of finding a chairperson. The initial resolution specified that the convention would complete its business within 12 months of its first meeting, hence by 1 December 2013. In August 2013, the chairman asked for an extension, which was granted by the government and then retrospectively approved by a resolution on 29 January 2014, extending its term until 31 March 2014.

=== Budget ===
The convention's budget was included under the Department of the Taoiseach; as such the annual budget made provision for it and the following year's report of the Comptroller and Auditor General gave the amount actually spent. Four civil servants from the Department of the Taoiseach worked for the convention. The total cost for three years was €1.367m.

| Year | Cost ( €000 ) | | Notes | Refs |
| Year | Provisioned | Outlaid | Notes | Refs |
|---|---|---|---|---|
| 2012 | 300 | 216 | Provisioned in a revised estimate in April 2012 | |
| 2013 | 920 | 824 | Full year of operation. | |
| 2014 | 920 | 327 | The estimate was for a full year, but the Convention finished in April. | |

== Deliberations ==
Tom Arnold summarised the convention's working methods thus:

The Convention met over 10 weekends of a day and a half. Each meeting had three components: presentation by experts of papers which had been circulated in advance; debate between groups advocating on either side of an issue; and roundtable discussions involving facilitators and notetakers. On Sunday morning the members considered again the discussions of the previous day and voted on a ballot paper which reflected the details of the debate.

=== Summary ===
| Issue/report | Convention recommendations | Government response |
|---|---|---|
| Reducing the President's term of office from seven to five years, and aligning with the European Parliament elections and local elections | No change to term of office; but supplementary recommendations were made: Reduce age of candidacy from 35 to 21; Allow candidate nomination by electors | A referendum was held on the Thirty-fifth Amendment of the Constitution (Age of Eligibility for Election to the Office of President) Bill 2015 on 22 May 2015. It was rejected by 73% to 27%.; Refer nomination proposal to Oireachtas committee |
| Reducing the voting age from 18 to 17 | Reduce to 16 | The government's July 2013 response promised a referendum by 2015. In January 2015, it reversed the decision, arguing that other referendums should take priority. |
| Amending the clause on the role of women in the home and encouraging greater participation of women in public life | Various: 1. Use gender-neutral language 2. Include carers outside the home as well as those inside 3. Requirement for gender equality 4. No requirement for positive measures to increase participation of women | Various: 1. Feasibility study commissioned, due to the large number of textual changes required 2. Accepted, with no timeframe for introduction of the amendment 3. Formal department of Justice review to be completed by 31 October 2014. The report was in fact completed in October 2016.; 4. N/A; Referendums were held on 8 March 2024 on the proposed Thirty-ninth and Fortieth (Family and Care) Amendments of the Constitution which were rejected. |
| Provision for the legalisation of same-sex marriage | Add a statement requiring (rather than merely allowing) legalisation. | A referendum was held on the Thirty-fourth Amendment of the Constitution of Ireland on 22 May 2015. It was approved by 62% to 38%. |
| Review Dáil electoral system | Various: 1. Retain single transferable vote rather than changing to mixed member system 2. Increase minimum size of Dáil constituency from three to five TDs; 3. Establish an electoral commission 4. Randomise order of candidates on ballot paper 5. Extend polling hours 6. Extend access to postal voting 7. Improve accuracy of electoral register 8. Permit non-Oireachtas ministers 9. Require ministers to resign Oireachtas seats 10. Permit legislation by popular initiative | Some of the proposals do not require constitutional amendment. The formal oral response was in December 2014; a written answer in April 2015 dealt with some points not addressed by the first response.: 1. Agreed; 2. Rejected; current sizes have "served the State well since 1948"; 3. Agreed (see Electoral Commission (Ireland)); 4. Let electoral commission decide 5. Let electoral commission decide 6. Let electoral commission decide 7. Agreed; "will continue to work with stakeholders" 8. Unelected ministers are possible if the Taoiseach nominates someone to the Senate and then appoints them to the cabinet.; 9. Rejected, because replacing ministers would trigger by-elections, and ministers would need to be returned automatically at the next election to free them from constituency work.; 10. Public involvement in legislation has increased thanks to the Oireachtas Public Service Oversight and Petitions Committee and pre-legislative scrutiny. |
| Giving citizens resident outside the State the right to vote in Presidential elections | Recommended. | Main article: Nonresident voting at Irish presidential elections Formal response scheduled for 26 May 2015 but pre-empted by other business. Made in January 2016 it was that the government was "committed to undertaking ... analysis" of the "complex and inter-related issues" involved. In March 2015, the government said "policy, legal and practical issues" on diaspora voting should be considered by the Minister for the Environment, Community and Local Government, the Minister for Foreign Affairs and Trade and the Minister of State with responsibility for diaspora affairs; in October 2015, Paudie Coffey said this work had begun. In 2017 the government formed after the 2016 election accepted the convention's 2013 recommendation, published a position paper listing seven options for eligibility criteria and associated implementation measures, and promised a constitutional referendum on whichever option it would select. In February 2019, the referendum was scheduled for that October, and the proposal would be "an extension of the franchise to all citizens resident outside the State, including citizens resident in Northern Ireland". |
| Removing the requirement to criminalise blasphemy | Replace with a ban on incitement to religious hatred. | A referendum was held on the Thirty-seventh Amendment of the Constitution of Ireland on 26 October 2018. It was approved by 65% to 35%. |
| Issues chosen by the convention, no.1: Dáil Reform | Various: 1. Ceann Comhairle given "more status" and elected by secret ballot 2. Mention committees in Constitution; 3. Allow backbenchers and opposition to make appropriation motions, instead of requiring cabinet pre-approval.; 4. Various other non-constitutional changes | 1. Accepted secret ballot and statement of status; rejected some of the specific details 2. Accepted; 3. Rejected; 4. Some accepted, others referred to the Dáil reform sub-committee |
| Issues chosen by the convention, no.2: Economic, social and cultural rights (ESC) | Insert provision that the State shall progressively realise ESC rights, subject to maximum available resources and that this duty is cognisable by the Courts. | Refer report to an Oireachtas committee. |
| Final report | Establish another convention; issues recommended for discussion: 1. environment 2. Seanad reform 3. local government reform | Future convention and agenda "matters for the next Government"; relevant past actions include: 1. Climate Action and Low Carbon Development Act 2015 "sets out the national objective of moving to a low-carbon, climate-resilient and environmentally-sustainable economy" 2. Bill to implement extend university Senate franchise 3. Local Government Reform Act 2014 |

=== Presidential elections, voting age ===
The first plenary session took place over the weekend of 26 and 27 January 2013. The topics of deliberation of this first session included, among other things, lowering the voting age, reducing the length of the presidential term of office, and aligning presidential elections with those for local authorities and the European Parliament. The following are some of the more important results from the first plenary session. Of the delegates who were present and voted, 52% voted in favour of reducing the voting age, while 47% voted against any such reduction. 38% of delegates voted that, if the voting age were to be reduced, it should be reduced to 17; 48% voted in favour of it being reduced to 16. As for the issue of making changes related to the office of the president, 57% voted against and 43% voted in favour of a reduction in the presidential term. 80% of delegates cast their vote against aligning presidential with local and European elections. 94% of delegates voted in favour of giving citizens a greater say in the nomination of presidential candidates.

=== Role of women ===
The second plenary session took place over the weekend of 16 and 17 February 2013. The topics of deliberation of this second session included, among other things, amending the Constitution to place a duty on the Irish State to enhance women's participation in politics and public life, and altering Article 41.2.1 of the Constitution related to women in the home. 50% of delegates voted against and 49% in favour of placing a positive duty on the State to take action to increase women's participation in politics and public life. 97% of delegates voted in favour of the following statement: “Leaving aside the Constitution, would you like to see more government action to encourage greater participation of women in politics and public life?” 89% of delegates agreed that the Constitution should be amended to include “gender-inclusive” language. 62% of delegates supported and 37% were against the Constitution being amended to include an “explicit provision on gender equality”. 88% of delegates disagreed that Article 41.2.1 should be left unchanged. 98% of delegates voted that were Article 41.2.1 to be changed, it should be made “gender-neutral” to include other careers in the home.

=== Issues chosen by the Convention ===
The terms of reference allowed the convention to consider "other issues, time permitting". These were originally scheduled for discussion on 30 November–1 December 2013, just before the anniversary of its inaugural ceremonial meeting. A May 2013 motion to consider the proposed abolition of the Seanad was defeated.

The convention announced on 14 October 2013 a series of meetings at which the general public was invited to suggest topics for the convention to consider. The meetings took place between 23 October and 25 November, in Cork, Galway, Waterford, Dublin, Sligo, Athlone, and Monaghan. These meetings supplement the pre-existing facility to submit online proposals, of which "a couple of thousand" had been received by the time of the announcement.

In December 2013, two topics were chosen: Dáil reform and Economic, Social and Cultural (ESC) rights. These were discussed in February 2014.

In February 2014, the convention recommended for inclusion in the Constitution the following ESC rights: right to housing; social security; essential health care; disability rights; linguistic and cultural rights; and rights covered in the International Covenant on Economic, Social and Cultural Rights.

== Delayed response ==
Although the resolution required the government to respond officially within four months of receiving a report from the convention, this deadline was missed for the fourth and subsequent reports, for which no formal response was made by the time the Dáil adjourned for its summer recess on 17 July 2014. The Taoiseach apologised and blamed the delay on the time taken by civil servants to analyse the reports prior to their being considered by the cabinet. He stated that "Obviously, the Government will not be able to hold all the referendums and must make a decision on what ones it should hold in conjunction with the marriage equality referendum next spring."

In November 2015, Kenny responded to Seán Ó Fearghaíl:

I have given an undertaking — I might need the Deputy's help — to set aside time in the remaining weeks of this Dáil session for a proper debate here on the outstanding reports from the Constitutional Convention. Some of the issues it raised actually required quite a deal of work in different Departments. I have given that undertaking and I hope to be able to honour it.

In December 2015, Kenny accepted responsibility for the delay again. Responses to the four remaining reports were delivered on 14 January 2016 by junior ministers Paul Kehoe and Ann Phelan.

== Criticisms ==
Noel Whelan described the February 2012 proposal as "something that is one part Oireachtas committee and two parts focus group, with an advisory role only and which will, at least initially, deal with what are essentially insignificant constitutional provisions".

Fintan O'Toole in June 2012 compared the convention to the Citizens Union, a reformist political organisation which Tammany Hall did not bother suppressing so long as did not threaten its hegemony. Twenty NGOs produced an open letter calling for the convention to examine human rights.

In the debate on the July Dáil resolution, opposition politicians criticised the composition, agenda, and limited power of the proposed Convention. Later in July, the Patrick MacGill summer school in Glenties had a seminar with academics and politicians discussing the convention.

An Irish Times editorial called the Convention "all form and little substance". An editorial in the Irish Independent described it as "unelected and powerless". Stephen Collins wrote that the November 2012 referendum on children's rights, with low turnout and unexpectedly high No-vote, suggested "putting such relatively minor issues [as those of the Convention] to the people in a referendum could easily rebound".

Some civil society groups complained that they ought to have been directly represented at the convention, instead of being expected to make written submissions and hope for an invitation to address one of its meetings. Fears expressed by commentators included that legislator members would control the process to the detriment of the citizen members, and that the demographic averaging of the membership would reduce input from marginalised minority groups.

Matthew Wall of Swansea University wrote in July 2013 that he was impressed by the convention's operation and the substance of its reports, and hopeful that the government would not simply reject any recommendations it found inconvenient.

In January 2015, Harry McGee of The Irish Times wrote, "Only two of 18 recommendations for constitutional change made by the Convention on the Constitution are to be put to referendum." In March 2015, David Farrell commended the level of public engagement with the convention and its efficient use of its small budget, but said its credibility was undermined by the government's dismissive responses. Fintan O'Toole similarly praised the convention's work, and suggested the government's tepid response would increase public cynicism with politics.

In November 2016, David Van Reybrouck commended the Constitutional Convention and its successor the Citizens' Assembly as models that other European countries could usefully imitate.

== Citizens' Assembly ==
Taoiseach Enda Kenny said in June 2015 that "While there was unanimous support for a second convention in the [Convention's final] report, it was acknowledged that this is an exercise that can only be achieved once in the lifetime of any Dáil".

In the buildup to 2016 general election, various politicians proposed changes to Irish abortion law, including repeal of the Eighth Amendment. In November 2015, Kenny promised "a Citizen's Convention on the constitution, or whatever title would be appropriate" to address the issue.

The Fine Gael–independent minority government formed after the 2016 election committed to establishing "a Citizens' Assembly, within six months, and without participation by politicians, and with a mandate to look at a limited number of key issues over an extended time period." The Assembly will not be restricted to constitutional issues, but three such issues specifically mentioned are the Eighth Amendment, fixed term parliaments, and "the manner in which referenda are held (e.g. should ‘super referendum days’, whereby a significant number of referenda take place on the same day, be held)."

== See also ==
- Second Republic (campaign group)
