= Second Republic (campaign group) =

- An Dara Poblacht
- Formation: 18 November 2010
- Founded at: Dublin

Second Republic is a campaign group for political reform in Ireland. The group was founded in 2010 and lobbied for the establishment of the Irish Constitutional Convention.

The group advocates the introduction of citizen-initiated referendums in Ireland, votes for the Irish diaspora, and participates in the Open Government Partnership. In 2015, the group made a submission to the working group on Seanad reform that comprised a public consultation of over 1,200 people.

In 2013, the group's founding member was shortlisted for a Volunteer of the Year Award for work done by Second Republic in building citizenship and campaigning for reform.
