= Nonresident voting at Irish presidential elections =

Various proposals have been considered since the 1980s to extend the franchise in Irish presidential elections to citizens resident outside the state. In 2019, the then government introduced a bill to amend the constitution to facilitate this extension. The bill lapsed in January 2020 when the 32nd Dáil was dissolved for the 2020 general election, but was restored to the order paper in July 2020.

At present, the only nonresident voting rights in Ireland are for university constituencies in Seanad Éireann and certain public servants posted abroad.

== Legal background ==
At present, Article 12.2.2° of the Constitution of Ireland reads:

Every citizen who has the right to vote at an election for members of Dáil Éireann shall have the right to vote at an election for President.

Dáil Éireann is the lower house of the Oireachtas (parliament) and Article 16.1.2° of the Constitution states:

i	All citizens, and
ii	such other persons in the State as may be determined by law,
without distinction of sex who have reached the age of eighteen years who are not disqualified by law and comply with the provisions of the law relating to the election of members of Dáil Éireann, shall have the right to vote at an election for members of Dáil Éireann.

The relevant law is section 8 of the Electoral Act 1992, which provides that, to be eligible for the electoral register for a given Dáil constituency, one must be:

- ordinarily resident in the constituency
- at least 18 years old
- either an Irish citizen, a British citizen, or a citizen of another EU country specified by ministerial order. The last provision allows for reciprocal agreements where Irish citizens resident in another EU country are allowed to vote in that country's legislative elections. As of 2020 no such agreement or ministerial order has been made.

The Electoral Act 1992 is an ordinary act of the Oireachtas which can be amended by a subsequent act of the Oireachtas; the Constitution can be amended by act of the Oireachtas but subject to approval of the electorate at a referendum. Ministerial orders are secondary legislation which the Oireachtas need not approve. It would be possible to give nonresidents the vote in both Dáil and Presidential elections by amending the 1992 act, but limiting the nonresident franchise to presidential elections would require a constitutional amendment.

== Political background ==
The Irish diaspora is large and the question of voting rights for emigrants and other expatriates has arisen continually since the 1980s. The Oireachtas committee on the constitution considered the matter in 2002; it recommended no extension of the franchise, but that among the senators nominated by the Taoiseach should be "a person or persons with an awareness of emigrant issues".

=== Constitutional Convention ===
The Constitutional Convention established in 2012 was directed to report on several issues, including "giving citizens resident outside the State the right to vote in Presidential elections at Irish embassies, or otherwise". It considered the matter at its plenary meeting on 28–29 September 2013 and recommended allowing expatriate citizens to vote. It made some more detailed discussions, voting as follows:

- Should citizens resident outside the State have the right to vote in Presidential elections? Yes 78–21 No
- Should citizens resident in Northern Ireland have the right to vote in Presidential elections? Yes 73–20 No

Restrictions:

Restriction	Percentage
All Irish citizens resident outside the island of Ireland	36
Just citizens who have lived in Republic of Ireland	26
Just citizens who have lived in Republic of Ireland as adults within the last...: ... (number of years) / 5 / 10 / 15 / 20 / 25 / No limit; Percentage / 14 / 17 / 20 / 6 / 4 / 38	27
Undecided/No opinion	11

=== Government response ===
Although the Fine Gael–Labour coalition government was supposed to give an official response in the Dáil within four months of receiving the convention's report, it was not until January 2016 that Ann Phelan said it was "committed to undertaking … analysis" of the "complex and inter-related issues" involved in the recommendation. It had already responded in March 2015 to a European Commission communication on "the consequences of disenfranchisement of Union citizens exercising their right to free movement", saying "policy, legal and practical issues" on diaspora voting should be considered by the Minister for the Environment, Community and Local Government, the Minister for Foreign Affairs and Trade and the Minister of State with responsibility for diaspora affairs; in October 2015, Paudie Coffey said this work had begun.

In 2017 the government formed after the 2016 election accepted the convention's 2013 recommendation, published a position paper listing seven options for eligibility criteria and associated implementation measures, and promised a constitutional referendum on whichever option it would select, to be held in May 2019 alongside the local elections. The seven options were:

1. All citizens resident outside the State;
2. All citizens on the island of Ireland, and all citizens outside the island of Ireland for a period of time who have lived in the State;
3. All citizens on the island of Ireland, and all citizens who have left the island in the previous 15 or 20 years;
4. All citizens on the island of Ireland, and all citizens resident outside the island of Ireland who hold a valid Irish passport;
5. All citizens resident outside the State who were previously registered to vote in the State;
6. Citizens resident outside the State who were born on the island of Ireland; or
7. All citizens on the island and all citizens resident outside the island of Ireland who were born on the island or who have lived on the island for at least one year.

=== 2019 bill ===
In February 2019, the government decided that, due to the urgency of dealing with Brexit, the referendum would be postponed until October; it also agreed that the proposal would be "an extension of the franchise to all citizens resident outside the State, including citizens resident in Northern Ireland". The text of the bill was agreed by the cabinet on 11 June, and the Thirty-ninth Amendment of the Constitution (Presidential Elections) Bill 2019 (bill no. 68 of 2019) was introduced in the Dáil by the Minister for Foreign Affairs and Trade Simon Coveney on 16 September 2019.

The bill proposed to amend the constitution in three places:

1. in Article 12.3.2°, the qualification for voting in Presidential elections would change
  - from "Every citizen who has the right to vote at an election for members of Dáil Éireann"
  - to "All citizens without distinction of sex who have reached the age of eighteen years who are not disqualified by law and comply with the provisions of the law relating to elections for the office of President"
2. in Article 12.3.3°, the window for organising Presidential elections to would be increased from 60 to 90 days, to allow for the longer time to process ballots from abroad.
3. a transitory Article 12A would be inserted to delay the effect of the Article 12.3 changes until 1 January 2025. This gives enough time to amend the Electoral Act 1992 to "regulate the detail and practical implementation of an extended franchise". Incumbent Michael D. Higgins' seven-year term expires on 10 November 2025, after the Article 12A cutoff date. Conversely, the new nonresident franchise would not apply to an early election for a vacancy caused by the President's death, resignation or removal from office.

Irish constitutional amendments require a referendum. The required Referendum Commission was established on 26 September, chaired by High Court judge David Barniville.

The 2019 bill lapsed with the dissolution of the 32nd Dáil on 14 January 2020, prior to the general election on 8 February. The election manifestos of Fine Gael and Sinn Féin supported nonresident voting in Presidential elections. It was restored to the order paper in July 2020.
