= History of the franchise in Ireland =

History of who can vote in Ireland

Ireland has had a franchise on an equal basis between men and women since the establishment of the Irish Free State in 1922. Historically, there had been discrimination from the franchise on the basis of religion (until 1793) and on the basis of property (until 1918). In 1972, the age of qualification for the franchise was reduced from 21 years to 18 years.

The basic law of the electoral franchise in Ireland is Article 16 of the Constitution of Ireland, which states who can vote for Dáil Éireann, the lower house of the Oireachtas or parliament. Irish citizens who are Dáil electors have the right to vote in all other elections, though not conversely.

== Religion ==
Roman Catholics were explicitly disenfranchised under the Disfranchising Act 1727, although earlier penal laws had effectively prevented Catholics from voting: the Popery Act 1703 (2 Anne c. 6 (I) required an oath of abjuration which most found incompatible with their faith, and a 1716 act, the Parliamentary Elections Act 1715 (2 Geo. 1. c. 19 (I)) required this oath at least six months before an election. The Roman Catholic Relief Act 1793 removed the disqualification of Catholics from the franchise.

== Property ==
In the pre-1801 Irish House of Commons, the forty-shilling freehold was used in county constituencies, while borough constituencies were mostly rotten boroughs with closed electorates. From the Act of Union 1800 to the creation of the Irish Free State in 1922, Irish electoral law was substantially equivalent to contemporary British law. One difference was that voter registration was every eight years in Ireland instead of annually. The Parliamentary Elections (Ireland) Act 1829 increased the freeholder qualification from forty shillings (two pounds) to ten pounds, reducing the county constituencies electorate from c.216,000 to c.37,000. This change in electoral law was enacted at the same time as the Roman Catholic Relief Act 1829, which allowed Catholics to sit in Parliament, as a quid-pro-quo to secure support from Protestants afraid of being overwhelmed by votes of less well-off Catholics. The Representation of the People (Ireland) Act 1832 increased the total electorate from c.75,000 to c.90,000, although it was vaguely worded and provoked numerous court cases. In the wake of the Great Famine, the Representation of the People (Ireland) Act 1850 increased the electorate from 61,000 to 165,000.

== Sex ==
Women's suffrage developed as in Great Britain. In England and Wales, the Local Government Act 1894 allowed women to vote for the local authorities established by the Local Government Act 1888; the Local Government (Ireland) Act 1898 replicated both the 1888 authorities and the 1894 suffrage in Ireland. The Representation of the People Act 1918 allowed all men over 21 and most women over 30 to vote in parliamentary elections. The Second Dáil resolved to hold a general election in June 1922 for an assembly which would be both the 3rd Dáil of the soon-to-be-defunct Irish Republic and a Provisional Parliament for the nascent Irish Free State. The republican minority wanted the franchise for this election to be equal for men and women, but the pro-Free State majority argued it was impractical and unlawful to change the 1918 franchise. Both sides were motivated by the belief that young women tended to be republican. The Second Dáil did agree that, if the post-election government, which was responsible to the new assembly, were to collapse, the consequent election would be on "Adult Suffrage". The 1922 Constitution of the Irish Free State reduced the voting age for women in elections for Dáil Éireann (the lower house) from 30 to 21, the same as for men. This was retained by the 1937 Constitution of Ireland.

== Police forces ==
From 1836, members of the Royal Irish Constabulary (RIC) and Dublin Metropolitan Police (DMP) were not allowed to vote. This was to preserve the impression of the forces' political impartiality. While police in England and Wales were enfranchised from 1887, this did not extend to Ireland. In 1960, members of the Garda Síochána were allowed to vote; the 1923 electoral act had carried forward the previous ban on RIC and DMP members voting for parliament, though they could vote in local elections.

== Age ==
The Free State Seanad (upper house) voting age was 30 for both sexes from its establishment in 1922 until 1928, when direct election was abolished. The only direct election was in 1925.

In 1935, the voting age for women was reduced from 30 to 21 for local elections. In 1972, the Fourth Amendment of the Constitution reduced the voting age to 18.

== Nationality ==
In 1985, British citizens gained the right to vote in Dáil elections, reciprocating Irish citizens' right to vote in the UK's elections under the Ireland Act 1949. The Ninth Amendment of the Constitution was passed in 1984 to allow for this. The Electoral Amendment Bill 1983 had purported to allow British citizens to vote, but was ruled to be unconstitutional by the Supreme Court. The 1985 change, restated in 1992, allows the Dáil franchise to be similarly extended on a reciprocal basis to citizens of other countries. As of 2021 this has not been applied.

There is no right of Irish expatriates to vote, except for Seanad university seats. Proposals to extend the right to the Seanad more generally, and to presidential elections, have been made at intervals since the 1990s, including a current government proposal to amend the constitution to allow all Irish citizens to vote in presidential elections.

== Prisoners ==
Since 2006, prisoners have been able to vote. They were never explicitly prohibited from voting, but the lack of postal voting and inability to travel to an external polling station effectively disenfranchised them.

== University representation ==
University constituencies, where graduates vote for legislators, existed in the House of Commons and then in the Dáil until 1937, and have been in the Seanad since its recreation in 1938. Dublin University was enfranchised in the pre-Union Commons in 1613, and the National University of Ireland at Westminster in 1918. In 1979, the Seventh Amendment of the Constitution allowed for the franchise to be extended to graduates of other Irish third-level institutions, but this has not been invoked. An argument made in support of the rejected 2013 proposal to abolish the Seanad was the elitism of giving graduates an extra legislative vote; some proposals for Seanad reform would give non-graduates a vote for the vocational panel senators instead.

== Constitution ==
The relevant parts of the Constitution state:

Article	Section	Subsection	Text
12	2	1°	The President shall be elected by direct vote of the people.
		2°	Every citizen who has the right to vote at an election for members of Dáil Éireann shall have the right to vote at an election for president.
		3°	The voting shall be by secret ballot and on the system of proportional representation by means of the single transferable vote.
16	1	2°	i	All citizens, and
			ii	such other persons in the State as may be determined by law,
			without distinction of sex who have reached the age of eighteen years who are not disqualified by law and comply with the provisions of the law relating to the election of members of Dáil Éireann, shall have the right to vote at an election for members of Dáil Éireann.
		3°	No law shall be enacted placing any citizen under disability or incapacity for membership of Dáil Éireann on the ground of sex or disqualifying any citizen or other person from voting at an election for members of Dáil Éireann on that ground.
		4°	No voter may exercise more than one vote at an election for Dáil Éireann, and the voting shall be by secret ballot.
28A	4		Every citizen who has the right to vote at an election for members of Dáil Éireann and such other persons as may be determined by law shall have the right to vote at an election for members of such of the local authorities referred to in section 2 of this Article as shall be determined by law.
47	3		Every citizen who has the right to vote at an election for members of Dáil Éireann shall have the right to vote at a Referendum.
