= Commonwealth and Protectorate =

The Commonwealth and Protectorate (1649–1660) refers to the kingless governments of England (including Wales and Cornwall), Scotland, Great Britain and Ireland during the Interregnum between the actual reigns of the Stuart King Charles I (1625–1649) and his son King Charles II (1660–1685).

See

- Commonwealth of England (under parliamentary rule, 1649–1653 and 1659–1660)

and

- The Protectorate (The Commonwealth of England, Scotland and Ireland, 1653–1659),
  under the Lords Protectors, first Oliver Cromwell (1653–1658) and then his son Richard Cromwell (1658–1659).

== See also ==
England

- Interregnum (England)
- Kingdom of England
- English Civil War
  - Cornwall in the English Civil War
- Restoration (England)

Great Britain, Ireland and the colonies

- British Interregnum
- Wars of the Three Kingdoms
- English overseas possessions in the Wars of the Three Kingdoms
- Colony of Virginia#English Civil War and Commonwealth (1642–1660)
- Battle of the Severn (Maryland, 1655)
- Restoration (1660)

Scotland

- Interregnum (Scotland)
- Scotland in the Early Modern Era
- Scotland in the Wars of the Three Kingdoms
- Scotland under the Commonwealth
- Restoration (Scotland)

Ireland

- Interregnum (Ireland)
- Kingdom of Ireland
- Confederate Ireland
- Irish Confederate Wars
- Cromwellian conquest of Ireland
- Restoration (Ireland)
