= Age of candidacy =

Minimum age for an elected governmental official

Age of candidacy is the minimum age at which a person can legally hold certain elected government offices. In many cases, it also determines the age at which a person may be eligible to stand for an election or be granted ballot access.

== International standards ==
International electoral standards which are defined in the International Public Human Rights Law, allow restricting candidacy on the basis of age. The interpretation of the International Covenant for Civil and Political Rights offered by the United Nations Human Rights Committee in the General Comment 25 states "Any conditions which apply to the exercise of the rights protected by article 25 (of the ICCPR) should be based on objective and reasonable criteria. For example, it may be reasonable to require a higher age for election or appointment to particular offices than for exercising the right to vote, which should be available to every adult citizen."

== Comparison ==
Minimum age to be a candidate for the lower house by country: ≥30 25–29 21–24 / 20 18 ≤17 / No data No legislature

Country	President	Vice President	Prime Minister	Upper house	Lower house	References
Albania	40		18	-	18	
Algeria	40			40	25	
Andorra	18		18	-	18	
Angola	35		-	-	18	
Antigua and Barbuda	-	-	21	21	21	
Argentina	30	30	-	30	25	
Armenia	40	-	25	-	25	
Australia	-	-	18	18	18	
Austria	35	-	18	18	18	
Azerbaijan		18	18	-	18	
Bahamas	-	-	21	30	21	
Bahrain	-	-	30	35	30	
Bangladesh	35	-	25	-	25	
Barbados		-	21	21	21	
Belarus	35	-	-	30	21	
Belgium	-	-	18	18	18	
Belize	-	-	18	18	18	
Benin	40		-	-	25	
Bhutan	-	-	25	25	25	
Bolivia	30	30	-	18	18	
Botswana	30	30	-	-	18	
Brazil	35	35	-	35	21	
Bulgaria	40	40	-	-	21	
Burkina Faso	35 (Note: Incumbent Ibrahim Traoré was 34 years old when he became president through a military coup.)	-		-		
Burundi	40			35	25	
Cambodia	30	-		40	25	
Cameroon	35	-		40	23	
Canada	-	-		30	18	
Cape Verde	35			-	18	
Central African Republic	35	-	-	-	-	
Chile	35		-	35	21	
China	45	45		-	18	
Colombia	30	30	-	30	25	
Comoros	35	-		-	18	
Democratic Republic of the Congo	30	-	25	30	25	
Republic of the Congo	30	-		45	25	
Costa Rica	30	30	-	-	21	
Croatia	18			-	18	
Cuba	35	35	35	-	18	
Cyprus	35	35 (indefinitely vacant)	-	25	25	
Czech Republic	40			40	21	
Denmark	-	-	18	-	18	
Djibouti	40	-		-	23	
Dominica	40	-	21	21	21	
Dominican Republic	30	30	-	25	25	
Ecuador	30	30	-	-	18	
Egypt	40	40	35	35	25	
El Salvador	30		-	-	25	
Equatorial Guinea	40		-	-	25	
Estonia	40			-	21	
Ethiopia				21	21	
Fiji		-	18	-	18	
Finland	18	-	18	-	18	
France	18			24	18	
Gabon	40		30			
Gambia	30		-	-	21	
Georgia	40	-	18	-	25	
Germany	40	-		18	18	
Ghana	40		-	-	21	
Greece	40	-	25	-	25	
Grenada	-	-	18	18	18	
Guatemala	40	40		18	18	
Guinea-Bissau	35	-		-	21	
Guyana	18	18	18	-	18	
Hong Kong	-	-	-		21	
Honduras	30	30	-	-	21	
Hungary	35	-		-	18	
Iceland	35	-		-	18	
India	35	35	25	30	25	
Indonesia	40 or has or is currently holding a position elected through general elections, including regional head elections	40 or has or is currently holding a position elected through general elections, including regional head elections	-	21	21	
Iran	21		-	-	26	
Iraq	40		35	(never established)	28	
Ireland	35	-		30	21	
Israel		-	30	-	21	
Italy	50	-		40	25	
Ivory Coast	35			-	23	
Jamaica	-	-	21	21	21	
Japan	25	-	30	30	25	
Jordan	-	-	40	40	30	
Kazakhstan	40	-		30	25	
Kenya	18	18	-	18	18	
Kiribati	21		-	-	21	
Kuwait	-	-	30	-	30	
Kyrgyzstan	35	-	21	-	21	
Kosovo	18	18	18	-	18	
Laos	20	20	20	-	20	
Latvia	40	-		-	21	
Lebanon	25		25		25	
Lesotho	-	-	18	21	18	
Liberia	35		-	30	25	
Libya	35			40	21	
Lithuania	40	-		-	25	
Luxembourg	-	-		-	18	
Madagascar	35	-				
Malawi	35	35	-	(never established)	21	
Malaysia	-	-	21	30	21	
Maldives	35	35	-	-	18	
Malta				-	18	
Marshall Islands	21	-	-	-	21	
Mauritania	40	-		35	25	
Mauritius	40	40	18	-	18	
Mexico	35	-	-	25	21	
Micronesia	30	30	-	-	30	
Moldova	40			-	18	
Monaco	-	-		-	25	
Mongolia	45	-		-	25	
Montenegro	18	-	18	-	18	
Mozambique	35	-		-	18	
Myanmar	45			30 (dissolved)	25 (dissolved)	
Namibia	35	35	21	21	21	
Nauru	20	-	-	-	20	
Nepal	45		35	35	25	
Netherlands	-	-	18	18	18	
New Zealand	-	-	18	-	18	
Nicaragua	25	25	-	-	21	
Nigeria	35	35	-	35	25	
North Korea				-	17	
Norway	-	-	18	-	18	
Pakistan	45	-	25	30	25	
Palau	35	35	-	25	25	
Palestine	40	-	-	-	28	
Panama	35	35	-	-	21	
Papua New Guinea	-	-		-	25	
Paraguay	30	30	-	35	25	
Peru	35	35	-	-	25	
Philippines	40	40		35	25	
Poland	35	-		30	21	
Portugal	35	-		-	18	
Qatar	-	-		-	30	
Romania	35	-		33	23	
Russia	35	-		-	21	
Rwanda	35	-		40	21	
Saint Kitts and Nevis	-	-	21	21	21	
Saint Lucia	-	-	21	30	21	
Saint Vincent and the Grenadines	-	-	21	21	21	
São Tomé and Príncipe	35	-		-	18	
Senegal	35	-		-	25	
Serbia		-		-	18	
Seychelles	18	18	-	-	18	
Sierra Leone	40		-	-	21	
Singapore	45	-	21	-	21	
Slovakia	40	-	21	-	21	
Solomon Islands	-	-	21	-	21	
South Africa			18	18	18	
South Korea	40	-	-	-	18	
Spain	-	-	18	18	18	
Sri Lanka	18	-	18	-	18	
Sudan	40	40	25	-	(never established)	
Suriname	30	30	30	-	21	
Sweden	-	-	18	-	18	
Switzerland	18	18	18	18	18	
Taiwan	40	40	-	-	23	
Tajikistan	30	-		30	30	
Tanzania	40		21	-	21	
Thailand	-	-	35	40	25	
Timor-Leste	35			-	17	
Togo	35	-		-	25	
Trinidad and Tobago	35	-	18	25	18	
Tunisia	40	-		-	23	
Turkey	40	40	-	-	18	
Tuvalu	-	-	21	-	21	
Uganda	18	18	18	-	18	
Ukraine	35	-		-	21	
United Kingdom	-	-	18	21	18	
United States	35	35	-	30	25	
Uruguay	35		-	30	25	
Uzbekistan	35	-		25	25	
Vanuatu	25	-	25	-	25	
Venezuela	30	30	-	-	21	
Vietnam	21	21	21	-	21	
Zambia	35	35	-	-	21	
Zimbabwe	-	-	-	40	21	

== Historical ==
The first known example of a law enforcing age of candidacy was the Lex Villia Annalis, a Roman law enacted in 180 BCE which set the minimum ages for senatorial magistrates.

== By country ==
=== Australia ===
In Australia a person must be aged 18 or over to stand for election to public office at federal, state or local government level. Prior to 1973, the age of candidacy for the federal parliament was 21.

The youngest ever member of the House of Representatives was 20-year-old Wyatt Roy, elected in the 2010 federal election. The youngest member of Penrith City Council, and of any local council in New South Wales, is Libby Austin, who was 19 at the time of her election in September 2024.

=== Austria ===
In Austria, a person must be 18 years of age or older to stand in elections to the European Parliament or National Council. The Diets of regional Länder are able to set a minimum age lower than 18 for to be in the polls in elections to the Diet itself as well as to municipal councils in the Land. In presidential elections the candidacy age is 35.

=== Belgium ===
Any Belgian who has reached the age of 18 years can stand for election for the Chamber of Representatives, can become a member of the Senate, or can be elected in one of the regional parliaments. This is regulated in the Constitution (Art. 64) and in the Special Law on the Reform of the Institutions.

=== Belize ===
According to the Constitution of Belize, a person must be at least 18 years old to be elected as a member of the House of Representatives and must be at least 30 to be Speaker of the House. A person must be at least 18 years old to be appointed to the Senate and must be at least 30 to be president or Vice-President of the Senate. As only members of the House of Representatives are eligible to be appointed prime minister, the Prime Minister must be at least 18 years old. A person must also be at least 18 years old to be elected to a village council.

=== Brazil ===
The Brazilian Constitution (Article 14, Section 3 (VI)) defines 35 years as the minimum age for someone to be elected president, Vice-President or Senator; 30 years for state Governor or Vice-Governor; 21 for Federal or State Deputy, Mayor or Vice-Mayor; and 18 for city Council member.

=== Canada ===
In Canada, the constitution does not outline any age requirements to run for elected office, simply stating "Every citizen of Canada has the right to vote in an election of the members of the House of Commons or of a legislative assembly and to be qualified for membership therein." However under the current Elections Canada Act to be eligible to run for elected office (municipal, provincial, federal) one must be a minimum of 18 years or older on the day of the election. Prior to 1970, the age requirement was 21 along with the voting age.

To be appointed to the Senate (Upper House), one must be at least 30 years of age and under 75 years of age.

In the province of Ontario, Sam Oosterhoff, a member of the Progressive Conservative Party of Ontario, was first elected at the age of 19 in a November 2016 by-election, the youngest Ontario MPP to ever be elected.

Pierre-Luc Dusseault (born May 31, 1991) is a Canadian politician who was elected to the House of Commons of Canada in the 2011 federal election at the age of 19, becoming the youngest Member of Parliament in the country's history. He was sworn into office two days after his 20th birthday. He was re-elected in 2015 but lost his seat in the 2019 Canadian federal election.

=== Central African Republic ===
Article 36 of the 2016 Constitution of the Central African Republic requires that candidates for President must "be aged thirty-five (35) years at least [on] the day of the deposit of the dossier of the candidature".

=== Chile ===
In Chile the minimum age required to be elected President of the Republic is 35 years on the day of the election. Before the 2005 reforms the requirement was 40 years, and from 1925 to 1981 it was 30 years. For senators it is 35 years (between 1981 and 2005 it was 40 years) and for deputies it is 21 years (between 1925 and 1970 it was 35 years).

=== China ===
In China the minimum age to be elected as president or vice-president is 45. All citizens who have reached the age of 18 have the right to vote and stand for election.

=== Cyprus ===
In Cyprus the minimum age to be elected president is 35 years. The minimum age to run for the House of Representatives was 25 years until the Constitution was amended in 2019 to lower the limit to 21.

=== Czech Republic ===
In the Czech Republic, a person must be at least 18-years-old to be elected in local elections. A person must be at least 21 years old to be elected to the lower house of the Czech Parliament or to the European Parliament and 40 years old to be a member of the upper house (Senate) of the Parliament or the President of the Czech Republic.

=== Denmark ===
In Denmark, any adult 18 years of age or older can become a candidate and be elected in any public election.

=== Estonia ===
In Estonia, any citizen 18 years of age or older can be elected in local elections, and 21 years or older in parliamentary elections. The minimum age for the President of Estonia is 40.

=== France ===
In France, any citizen 18 years of age or older can be elected to the lower house of Parliament, and 24 years or older for the Senate. The minimum age for the President of France is 18.

=== Germany ===
In Germany a citizen must be 18 or over to be elected at the national level, like the Chancellor, and this age to be elected at the regional or local level. A person must be 40 or over to be President.

=== Greece ===
In Greece, those aged 25 years old and over who hold Greek citizenship are eligible to stand and be elected to the Hellenic Parliament. All over 40 years old are eligible to stand for presidency.

=== Hong Kong ===
In Hong Kong a person must be at least 21 to be candidate in a district council or Legislative Council election. A person must be at least 40 to be candidate in the Chief Executive election, and also at least 40 to be candidate in the election for the President of the Legislative Council from among the members of the Legislative Council.

=== Iceland ===
For the office of President, any Icelandic citizen who has reached the age of 35 and fulfills the requirement necessary to vote in elections to the Althing is eligible to be elected president.

=== India ===
In India a person must be at least:

- 35 to be the President or Vice President, Governor, and Lieutenant Governor of the states and union territories as specified in the Constitution of India
- 30 to be a member of Rajya Sabha (the upper house of Parliament of India) and a State Legislative Council (the upper house of a State Legislature, in those states where the legislature is bicameral).
- 25 to be the Prime Minister, Lok Sabha Speaker, Union Minister, Chief Minister, Assembly Speaker, and State Minister in the state governments. Additionally, to be a member of the Lok Sabha (the lower house of Parliament of India) and a State Legislative Assembly (the lower house or only house of a State Legislature in the states of India.)
- 21 to be the Mayor, Chairperson, Head and a Member (Members are variously called Corporators/Councillors/Ward Members according to the type of their respective local bodies) of a Municipal Corporation, Municipal Council, Nagar Panchayat, District Council, Block Panchayat, and Gram Panchayat respectively.

Criticism has been on the rise to decrease the age of candidacy in India. Young India Foundation has been working on a campaign to decrease the age of candidacy in India for MPs and MLAs to better reflect the large young demographic of India.

=== Indonesia ===
In Indonesia a person must be at least:

- 40 to be President or Vice President or has or is currently holding a position elected through general elections, including regional head elections as specified in the Constitution of Indonesia
- 30 to be Governor or Lieutenant Governor, as specified in the 2004 Regional Government Act
- 25 to be Regent, Vice Regent, Mayor, or Deputy Mayor, as specified in the 2004 Regional Government Act
- 21 to be Senator or Representative in both national and local parliament, as specified in the 2008 Election Act

=== Israel ===
In Israel one must be at least 21 to become a member of the Knesset (Basic Law: The Knesset section 6(a)) or a municipality. When the Prime Minister was directly elected, one must have been a member of the Knesset who is at least 30 to be a candidate for prime minister. Every Israeli Citizen (including minors) can be appointed as a Government Minister, or elected as President of Israel, but the latter role is mostly ceremonial and elected by the Parliament.

=== Italy ===
In Italy, a person must be at least 50 to be President of the Republic, 40 to be a Senator, and 25 to be a Deputy, as specified in the 1947 Constitution of Italy. 18 years of age is sufficient, however, to be elected member of the Council of Regions, Provinces, and Municipalities (Communes).

=== Iran ===
In Iran a person must be at least 21 years old to run for president.

=== Iraq ===
The Iraqi constitution states that a person must be at least 40 years old to run for president and 35 years old to be prime minister. Until 2019, the electoral law set the age limit at 30 years old for candidates to run for the Council of Representatives. However, the new Iraqi Council of Representatives Election Law (passed in 2019, yet to be enacted) lowered the age limit to 28.

=== Ireland ===
The 1937 Constitution of Ireland requires the President to be at least 35 and members of the Oireachtas (legislature) to be 21. Members of the European Parliament for Ireland must also be 21. Members of local authorities must be 18, reduced from 21 in 1973. The 1922–1937 Constitution of the Irish Free State required TDs (members of the Dáil, lower house) to be 21, whereas Senators had to be 35 (reduced to 30 in 1928). At the 1987 general election, the High Court ruled that a candidate (Hugh Hall) was eligible who reached the minimum age after the date of nomination but before the date of election. The Thirty-fifth Amendment of the Constitution Bill 2015 proposed to lower the presidential age limit to 21. However, this proposal was rejected by 73% of the voters.

=== Japan ===
In Japan a person must be at least:

- 25 to be the Member of parliament of the House of Representatives with Japanese nationality, to be the Member of metropolitan, prefecture, city, town, or village with valid vote rights, or to be the Mayor
- 30 to be the Governor, or to be the Member of parliament of the House of Councillors with Japanese nationality. See also House of Peers (Japan).

=== Kazakhstan ===
In Kazakhstan, the age of candidacy for various political offices is determined by the Constitution of Kazakhstan and election laws. The specific age requirements are as follows:

- 40 to be President of Kazakhstan.
- 30 to be deputy of the Senate of the Parliament of Kazakhstan.
- 25 to be deputy of the Mäjilis of the Parliament of Kazakhstan.
- 25 to be akim (local head)
- 18 to be deputy of the mäslihat (local assembly)

=== Lithuania ===
In Lithuania a person must be at least:

- 21 to be the Member of parliament of the Seimas with Lithuanian nationality.
- 40 to be the President of Lithuania with Lithuanian nationality.

=== Luxembourg ===
In Luxembourg a person must be at least 18-years-old to stand as a candidate to be a member of the Chamber of Deputies, the country's unicameral national legislature.

=== Malaysia ===
In Malaysia a citizen shall be over 18 years of age to become a candidate and be elected to the Dewan Rakyat and Dewan Undangan Negeri, and a person shall be over 30 to be the Senator by constitution.

=== Mexico ===
In Mexico, a person must be at least 35 to be president, 25 to be a senator, or 21 to be a Congressional Deputy, as specified in the 1917 Constitution of Mexico.

=== Netherlands ===
In the Netherlands, any adult 18 years of age or older can become elected in any public election. To be a candidate the person has to reach this age during the time for which the elections are held.

=== New Zealand ===
In New Zealand the minimum age to be Prime Minister of New Zealand is 18 years old. Citizens and permanent residents who are enrolled as an elector are eligible to be a candidate for election as a Member of Parliament.

=== Nigeria ===
In Nigeria, a person must be at least 35 years of age to be elected President or Vice President, 35 to be a senator, 30 to be a State Governor, and 25 to be a Representative in parliament or Member of the States' House of Assembly.

=== North Korea ===
In North Korea, any person eligible to vote in elections to the Supreme People's Assembly is also eligible to stand for candidacy. The age for both voting and candidacy is 17.

=== Norway ===
In Norway, any adult, aged 18 or over within the calendar year, can become a candidate and be elected in any public election.

=== Palestine ===
Palestinian parliamentary candidates must be at least 28 years old, while the presidential candidates must be at least 40 years old.

=== Pakistan ===
In Pakistan, a person must be at least 45 years old to be President. A person must be at least 25 years old to be a member of the provincial assembly or national assembly.

=== Philippines ===
Ages of candidacy in the Philippines
Type of candidate	Minimum age
President and Vice President	40
Senator	35
Member of the House of Representatives	25
Member of the Bangsamoro Parliament	25
Provincial-level elected official	23
City-level elected official in Highly Urbanized Cities	23
Mayor or Vice Mayor of all other cities or municipalities	21
Member of Sangguniang Panlungsod or Sangguniang Bayan in all other cities or municipalities	18
Barangay-level elected official (except for Sangguniang Kabataan)	18
Member of Sangguniang Kabataan	15 (Note: The maximum age of candidacy for this position is 21.)

=== Poland ===
Ages of candidacy in Poland
Type of candidate	Minimum age
President	35
Senator	30
Mayor/Wójt	25
Member of the Parliament/Poseł	21
Member of the European Parliament	21
Councillor	18

=== Portugal ===
Ages of candidacy in Portugal
Type of candidate	Minimum age	References
President	35	
Parliament	18	

=== Russia ===
In Russia a person must be at least 35 to run for president.

=== Singapore ===
In Singapore a person must be at least 45 years old to run for president. 21 year-olds can stand in parliamentary elections.

=== South Africa ===
Section 47, Clause 1 of the 1996 Constitution of South Africa states that "Every citizen who is qualified to vote for the National Assembly is eligible to be a member of the Assembly", defaulting to Section 46 which "provides for a minimum voting age of 18 years" in National Assembly elections; Sections 106 and 105 provide the same for provincial legislatures.

=== South Korea ===
Ages of candidacy in South Korea
Type of candidate	Minimum age
President	40
Member of Parliament, Member of Legislative Assembly, Councillor	18
Mayor	18
Governor	18

=== Spain ===
Spain has two legislative chambers of Parliament, a lower house and an upper house. These are the Congress of Deputies (lower house) and the Senate of Spain (upper house) respectively. The minimum age requirement to stand and to be elected to either house is 18 years of age.

=== Sweden ===
In Sweden, any citizen at least 18 years old, who resides, or who has resided in the realm can be elected to parliament. Citizens of Sweden, the European Union, Norway or Iceland aged 18 and over may be elected to county or municipal council. Citizens of other countries may also be elected to council, provided they have resided in the realm for at least three years.

=== Switzerland ===
In Switzerland, any citizen aged 18 or over can become a candidate and be elected in any federal election.

=== Taiwan ===
In the Republic of China (commonly known as Taiwan), the minimum age of candidacy is 23, unless otherwise specified in the Constitution or any relevant laws. The Civil Servants Election and Recall Act specifies that candidates for township, city, and indigenous district chiefs must be at least 26, and candidates for municipality, county, and city governors must be at least 30. The minimum age to be elected as president or vice-president is 40.

=== Tibet ===
The 14th Dalai Lama was enthroned at the age of 4, and none of his predecessors have been enthroned before age 4. The coming of age for the Dalai Lama is 18, when responsibilities are assumed.

=== Turkey ===
The 1876 constitution set the age for parliamentary elections as 30. This remained unchanged until 13 October 2006, when it was lowered to 25 through a constitutional amendment. In 2017, it was further lowered to 18, the same as the voting age. In presidential elections the candidacy age is 40.

=== United Kingdom ===
In the United Kingdom, a person must be aged 18 or over to stand in elections to all parliaments, assemblies, and councils within the UK, devolved, or local level. This age requirement also applies in elections to any individual elective public office; the main example is that of an elected mayor, whether of London or a local authority. There are no higher age requirements for particular positions in public office. Candidates are required to be aged 18 on both the day of nomination and the day of the poll.

Previously, the requirement was that candidates be 21 years old. During the early 2000s, the British Youth Council and other groups successfully campaigned to lower age of candidacy requirements in the United Kingdom. The age of candidacy was reduced from 21 to 18 in England, Wales and Scotland on 1 January 2007, when section 17 of the Electoral Administration Act 2006 entered into force.

=== United States ===
In the United States, a person must be aged 35 or over to serve as president. To be a senator, a person must be aged 30 or over. To be a Representative, a person must be aged 25 or older. This is specified in the U.S. Constitution. Most states in the U.S. also have age requirements for the offices of Governor, State Senator, and State Representative. Some states have a minimum age requirement to hold any elected office (usually 21 or 18).

==== Controversies ====
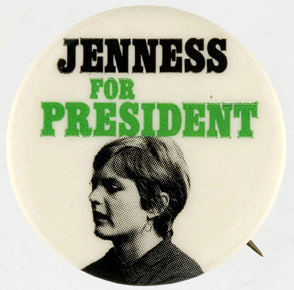
In 1972, Linda Jenness ran for president of the United States as the third-party Socialist Workers Party candidate, although she was 31 at the time.

Many youth rights groups view current age of candidacy requirements as unjustified age discrimination. Occasionally people who are younger than the minimum age will run for an office in protest of the requirement or because they do not know that the requirement exists. On extremely rare occasions, young people have been elected to offices they do not qualify for and have been deemed ineligible to assume the office.

In 1872, Victoria Woodhull ran for President of the United States, although according to the Constitution she would have been too young to be President if elected.

In 1934, Rush Holt of West Virginia was elected to the Senate of the United States at the age of 29. Since the U.S. Constitution requires senators to be at least 30, Holt was forced to wait until his 30th birthday, six months after the start of the session, before being sworn in.

In 1954, Richard Fulton won election to the Tennessee Senate. Shortly after being sworn in, Fulton was ousted from office because he was 27 years old at the time. The Tennessee State Constitution required that senators be at least 30. Rather than hold a new election, the previous incumbent, Clifford Allen, was allowed to resume his office for another term. Fulton went on to win the next State Senate election in 1956 and was later elected to the U.S. House of Representatives where he served for 10 years.

In 1964, Congressman Jed Johnson Jr. of Oklahoma was elected to the 89th Congress in the 1964 election while still aged 24 years. However, he became eligible for the House after turning 25 on his birthday, 27 December 1964, seven days before his swearing in, making him the youngest legally elected and seated member of the United States Congress ever.

In South Carolina, two Senators aged 24 were elected, but were too young according to the State Constitution: Mike Laughlin in 1969 and Bryan Dorn (later a U.S. congressman) in 1941. They were seated anyway.

On several occasions, the Socialist Workers Party (USA) has nominated candidates too young to qualify for the offices they were running for. In 1972, Linda Jenness ran as the SWP presidential candidate, although she was 31 at the time. Since the U.S. Constitution requires that the President and Vice President be at least 35 years old, Jenness was not able to receive ballot access in several states in which she otherwise qualified. Despite this handicap, Jenness still received 83,380 votes. In 2004, the SWP nominated Arrin Hawkins as the party's vice-presidential candidate, although she was 28 at the time. Hawkins was also unable to receive ballot access in several states due to her age.

==== Reform efforts ====
In the United States, many groups have attempted to lower age of candidacy requirements in various states. In 1994, South Dakota voters rejected a ballot measure that would have lowered the age requirements to serve as a State Senator or State Representative from 25 to 18. In 1998, however, they approved a similar ballot measure that reduced the age requirements for those offices from 25 to 21. In 2002, Oregon voters rejected a ballot measure that would have reduced the age requirement to serve as a State Representative from 21 to 18.

=== Venezuela ===
In Venezuela, a person must be at least 30 to be President or Vice President, 21 to be a deputy for the National Assembly and 25 to be the Governor of a state.

== See also ==
- Ageism
- Ballot access
- Electoral reform
- Voting age
- Youth
- Youth suffrage
- Youth rights
