= Thirty-fifth Amendment of the Constitution Bill 2015 =

Proposal to reduce the minimum age of candidacy for the office of President

- 22 May 2015
- To reduce the minimum age of candidacy for the office of President from 35 to 21

Results
Choice	Votes	%
Yes	520,898	26.94%
No	1,412,602	73.06%
Valid votes	1,933,500	99.18%
Invalid or blank votes	15,938	0.82%
Total votes	1,949,438	100.00%
Registered voters/turnout	3,221,681	60.51%
- How the electorate voted, by constituency. Proportion of the valid poll voting no: 75.00%—80.00% 70.00%—74.99% 65.00%—69.99% 60.00%—64.99%

The Thirty-fifth Amendment of the Constitution (Age of Eligibility for Election to the Office of President) Bill 2015 (bill no. 6 of 2015) was a proposed amendment to the constitution of Ireland to reduce the minimum age of candidacy for the office of President of Ireland from 35 to 21. The bill was introduced to the Oireachtas in January 2015 by the Fine Gael–Labour government, after which both houses of the Oireachtas passed the bill. The bill was rejected by the electorate in a referendum on 22 May 2015 by 73.1% against to 26.9% in favour.

== Background ==
The office of President was created when the Constitution was enacted in 1937. Douglas Hyde, the first president, took office in 1938. The age limit of 35 was set in the draft constitution introduced by the then Executive Council, in line with that of other countries, including the President of the United States. The draft subsection originally read:

Every citizen who has reached his 35th year of age and is not placed under disability or incapacity by law, is eligible for election to the office of President.

When the President of the Executive Council, Éamon de Valera, undertook to delete the words "and is not placed under disability or incapacity by law", he stated, "And if I get any support from the other members of the House, I should be inclined to say that I would wipe out the 35 years of age provision, too." The latter was not pursued.

Until the 1990 election of Mary Robinson, presidents were older men at the end of their career. The 1996 Constitution Review Group was divided on whether to reduce the age limit; the majority favoured "no change, or only a minor reduction", while a minority felt the age should be the same as for election to the Oireachtas (then 21). In 1997, the Oireachtas joint committee on the Constitution disagreed, recommending a reduction to age 18. Private member's bills to reduce the age limit to 18 were introduced in 1999 by Eamon Gilmore and in 2011 by Catherine Murphy; neither was enacted.

After the 2011 general election, Fine Gael and the Labour Party formed a coalition government, the programme of which included the establishment of a Constitutional Convention to examine potential changes on specified issues, including "Reducing the President's term of office from seven to five years, and aligning with the European Parliament elections and local elections". The convention considered the issue at its first working meeting, in January 2013, and voted against either of the specified proposals; however, it voted in favour of two others: reducing the nomination age from 35 to 21, and allowing candidate nomination by electors. The age-reduction proposal was passed by 50 votes to 47, with three "don't know". The choice of relatively minor questions for the convention's first meeting was defended by the Taoiseach, who said, "It is not that there are no exceptionally difficult constitutional issues, but the aim is to see how the constitutional convention will actually operate and whether it can do its work effectively." The convention's report on its first meeting was formally submitted in March 2013, and the government formally responded in July, when Taoiseach Enda Kenny promised a referendum "before the end of 2015" on reducing the age of candidacy; the proposal on popular nomination was referred to an Oireachtas committee. In December 2014, the cabinet agreed to hold the promised referendum in May 2015, and in January 2015, the amendment bill was formally introduced in the Dáil by the Minister for the Environment, Community and Local Government, Alan Kelly.

The government held simultaneous referendums on 22 May 2015, on the presidential age bill and another constitutional amendment, to allow same-sex marriage. A Dáil by-election in Carlow–Kilkenny was held on the same day.

== Wording ==
The bill as passed by both Houses of the Oireachtas proposed to change the wording of Article 12.4.1° from [emphasis added]:

(in Irish) Gach saoránach ag a bhfuil cúig bliana tríochad slán, is intofa chun oifig an uachtaráin é.

(in English) Every citizen who has reached his thirty-fifth year of age is eligible for election to the office of President.

to:

(in Irish) Is intofa chun oifig an Uachtaráin gach saoránach ag a bhfuil bliain agus fiche slán.

(in English) Every citizen who has reached the age of twenty-one years is eligible for election to the office of President.

Although the proposed change concerned both versions of the text, it is the Irish language version that takes precedence. As well as the substantive change down to 21, the proposed wording modifies two ambiguities in the English-language version of the text. Firstly, it avoids an ambiguity as to the year in question: one's "thirty-fifth year" begins immediately after one's thirty-fourth birthday, so a strict reading of the text does not have the intended meaning. Secondly, the male pronoun "his" is removed in favour of gender-neutral language. These changes were however essentially symbolic: two women, Mary Robinson and Mary McAleese had already been presidents of Ireland, and the original Irish text unambiguously indicates the age of eligibility as 35.

== Campaign and debate ==
The presidential age referendum was the subject of far less media coverage or active advocacy than the marriage referendum, and described as "forgotten", "invisible", or "the other referendum". Fine Gael, Fianna Fáil, and Sinn Féin were nominally in favour, though some representatives of Fine Gael and Fianna Fáil said they would be voting No. The Labour Party took no position on the referendum, having supported the bill in the Oireachtas. The Union of Students in Ireland supported a Yes vote. Solidarity called for a Yes vote in the referendum and put forward an amendment in the Dáil to reduce the age to 18.

In The Irish Times in February 2015, academics Theresa Reidy and Colum Kenny took opposite stances on the proposal. Reidy argued that it would encourage youth participation in politics and broaden the choice of candidates available to voters, while admitting that the issue was far less important than other amendment proposals not proceeded with. Kenny argued that any young person likely to succeed in being nominated would be "a creature of a political party, chosen and funded as a gimmick", and suggested that a No vote would "send a message to Oireachtas Éireann that politicians ought not to toy with the Constitution or patronise the electorate". Diarmaid Ferriter endorsed an internet comment that "the only under 35-year-olds who would think that they would be suitable for the role would be the sort of self-righteous Yoof upstarts that should be let nowhere near such an important and distinguished position". Fintan O'Toole called it "the single most frivolous proposal ever put to the people". Among Yes-advocates, Michael Noonan named Michael Collins and (jocularly) Jesus as prominent people too young to run; among No-advocates, Niall Horan was similarly instanced.

== Result ==
The national result was as follows:

Thirty-fifth Amendment of the Constitution (Age of Eligibility for Election to the Office of President) Bill 2015
Choice	Votes	%
For	520,898	26.94
Against	1,412,602	73.06
Total	1,933,500	100.00
Valid votes	1,933,500	99.18
Invalid/blank votes	15,938	0.82
Total votes	1,949,438	100.00
Registered voters/turnout	3,221,681	60.51

Results by constituency
Constituency	Electorate	Turnout (%)	Votes		Proportion of votes	
Constituency	Electorate	Turnout (%)	Yes	No	Yes	No
Carlow–Kilkenny	104,735	65.44%	17,507	50,738	25.65%	74.35%
Cavan–Monaghan	99,265	57.19%	14,167	41,997	25.22%	74.78%
Clare	81,809	59.43%	11,576	36,633	24.01%	75.99%
Cork East	81,271	60.93%	12,290	36,808	25.03%	74.97%
Cork North-Central	75,263	59.87%	11,980	32,625	26.86%	73.14%
Cork North-West	62,143	62.76%	8,860	29,822	22.90%	77.10%
Cork South-Central	92,422	63.85%	15,789	42,799	26.95%	73.05%
Cork South-West	60,141	61.70%	8,733	28,091	23.72%	76.28%
Donegal North-East	59,721	51.45%	8,678	21,797	28.48%	71.52%
Donegal South-West	62,171	51.55%	8,895	22,857	28.01%	71.99%
Dublin Central	57,193	57.95%	12,012	20,796	36.61%	63.39%
Dublin Mid-West	67,091	63.39%	12,096	30,089	28.67%	71.33%
Dublin North	72,523	65.81%	14,069	33,358	29.66%	70.34%
Dublin North-Central	53,785	68.83%	10,878	25,915	29.57%	70.43%
Dublin North-East	59,549	66.37%	11,583	27,664	29.51%	70.49%
Dublin North-West	51,207	59.61%	9,363	20,857	30.98%	69.02%
Dublin South	103,969	67.83%	22,788	47,349	32.49%	67.51%
Dublin South-Central	80,406	60.56%	16,560	31,753	34.28%	65.72%
Dublin South-East	59,376	57.98%	12,848	21,307	37.62%	62.38%
Dublin South-West	71,232	63.41%	13,437	31,387	29.98%	70.02%
Dublin West	65,643	64.37%	12,279	29,742	29.22%	70.78%
Dún Laoghaire	80,176	67.03%	16,690	36,633	31.30%	68.70%
Galway East	85,900	56.00%	10,673	36,901	22.43%	77.57%
Galway West	95,180	55.16%	13,948	38,080	26.81%	73.19%
Kerry North–West Limerick	62,523	57.20%	8,244	27,178	23.27%	76.73%
Kerry South	57,524	58.17%	7,280	25,863	21.97%	78.03%
Kildare North	79,014	62.05%	13,259	35,459	27.22%	72.78%
Kildare South	60,384	58.40%	9,151	25,880	26.12%	73.88%
Laois–Offaly	108,436	58.37%	14,951	47,793	23.83%	76.17%
Limerick	64,100	58.50%	8,495	28,621	22.89%	77.11%
Limerick City	61,421	63.30%	10,719	27,865	27.78%	72.22%
Longford–Westmeath	87,425	54.75%	11,508	35,898	24.28%	75.72%
Louth	102,561	59.91%	16,219	44,754	26.60%	73.40%
Mayo	97,296	57.49%	13,167	42,231	23.77%	76.23%
Meath East	64,956	59.68%	9,790	28,756	25.40%	74.60%
Meath West	63,649	56.27%	8,794	26,706	24.77%	75.23%
Roscommon–South Leitrim	59,392	61.49%	8,143	28,055	22.50%	77.50%
Sligo–North Leitrim	62,031	57.78%	8,859	26,633	24.96%	75.04%
Tipperary North	65,118	62.53%	9,306	31,040	23.07%	76.93%
Tipperary South	58,262	59.27%	7,815	26,379	22.85%	77.15%
Waterford	79,669	59.35%	12,251	34,534	26.19%	73.81%
Wexford	111,474	57.80%	16,430	47,424	25.73%	74.27%
Wicklow	94,275	68.76%	18,818	45,535	29.24%	70.76%
Total	3,221,681	60.51%	520,898	1,412,602	26.94%	73.06%

== Reaction ==
The National Youth Council of Ireland regretted the defeat, which it said "was due, in part, to a failure on the Government’s side to explain or promote the issue".
