= Feminism in the Republic of Ireland =

Feminism has played a major role in shaping the legal and social position of women in present-day Ireland. The role of women has been influenced by numerous legal changes in the second part of the 20th century, especially in the 1970s.

== History ==
=== 1870–1910s: before independence ===
The women's movement in what was to become the Republic of Ireland started in the second half of the 19th century. The pioneer of the women's movement on Ireland was Anna Haslam, who in 1876 founded the pioneering Dublin Women's Suffrage Association (DSWA), which campaigned for a greater role for women in local government and public affairs, aside from being the first women's suffrage society (after the Irish Women's Suffrage Society by Isabella Tod in 1872).

The DSWA was followed by the Irish Women's Franchise League (1908) and the Irish Catholic Women's Suffrage Association (1915), as well as the Irish Women's Suffrage Federation (IWSF), founded to unite scattered suffrage societies in Ireland. Another important association for women's rights were the Irish Women Workers' Union, which was set up on 5 September 1911 because other trade unions of the time excluded women workers.

=== 1910–1920s: revolution and suffrage ===
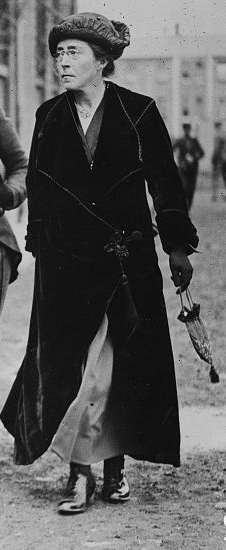
Hanna Sheehy Skeffington in 1916

Women participated actively in the Easter Rising of 1916, the most significant uprising in Ireland since the rebellion of 1798 and the first armed action of the Irish revolutionary period. Hanna Sheehy Skeffington, a voting rights activist, told audiences during a speaking tour in 1917 that "it is the only instance I know of in history when men fighting for freedom voluntarily included women."

Approximately 300 women took part in the subsequent Irish War of Independence, many of whom were members of the Irish republican paramilitary group Cumann na mBan. In advance of the 2016 commemoration of the Rising, several historians worked to raise awareness of women's roles. We Were There – 77 Women of the Easter Rising by Mary McAuliffe and Liz Gillis documents the stories of 77 women who were jailed for participating in the uprising. They were typically activists who had fought for social justice and equality in a variety of ways: land reform, labor organizing and women’s suffrage.

From 1918, with the rest of the United Kingdom, women in Ireland could vote at age 30 with property qualifications or in university constituencies, while men could vote at age 21 with no qualification. From separation in 1922, the Irish Free State gave equal voting rights to men and women. ["All citizens of the Irish Free State (Saorstát Éireann) without distinction of sex, who have reached the age of twenty-one years and who comply with the provisions of the prevailing electoral laws, shall have the right to vote for members of Dáil Éireann, and to take part in the Referendum and Initiative."] Promises of equal rights from the Proclamation were embraced in the Constitution in 1922, the year Irish women achieved full voting rights.

An order in 1924 required female civil servants to retire on marriage. Under the Juries Act 1927, women were exempted from jury duty but entitled to serve.

=== 1930s: loss of freedoms ===
While the first Irish Free State government supported women's rights, over the next ten years Taoiseach Éamon de Valera, who was not a supporter of women's emancipation, together with the church, enshrined Catholic and socially conservative teachings in law. Contraception in Ireland was made illegal in 1935 under the Criminal Law (Amendment) Act 1935.

The 1937 Constitution of Ireland guaranteed women the right to vote and to nationality and citizenship on an equal basis with men. However, divorce was banned, and Article 41.2 stated:

1° [...] the State recognises that by her life within the home, woman gives to the State a support without which the common good cannot be achieved. 2° The State shall, therefore, endeavour to ensure that mothers shall not be obliged by economic necessity to engage in labour to the neglect of their duties in the home.

=== 1970s: second-wave feminist movements ===
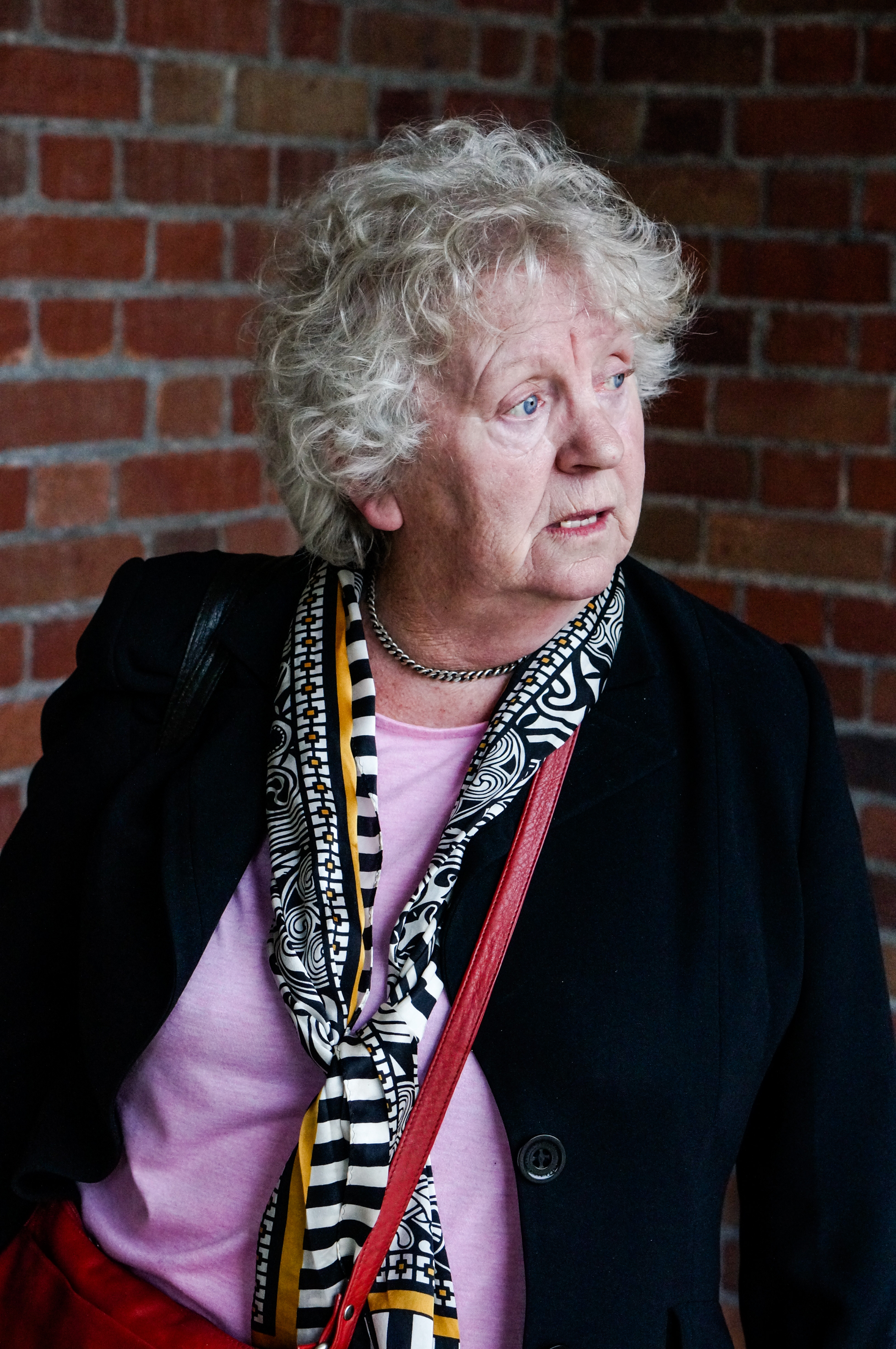
Nell McCafferty

Second-wave feminism in Ireland began in the 1970s, fronted by women such as Nell McCafferty, Mary Kenny, June Levine and Nuala O'Faolain. At the time, the majority of women in Ireland were housewives.

The Irish Women's Liberation Movement was an alliance of a group of Irish women who were concerned about the sexism within Ireland, both socially and legally. They first began after a meeting in Dublin's Bewley's Cafe on Grafton Street in 1970. They later had their meetings in Margaret Gaj's restaurant on Baggot Street every Monday. The group was short-lived, but influential. It was initially started with twelve women, most of whom were journalists. One of the co-founders was June Levine.

In 1971, a group of Irish feminists (including June Levine, Mary Kenny, Nell McCafferty, Máirín Johnston, and other members of the Irish Women's Liberation Movement) travelled to Belfast, Northern Ireland, on the so-called "Contraceptive Train" and returned with condoms, which were then illegal in Ireland.

In 1973, a group of feminists, chaired by Hilda Tweedy of the Irish Housewives Association, set up the Council for the Status of Women, with the goal of gaining equality for women. It was an umbrella body for women's groups. During the 1990s the council's activities included supporting projects funded by the European Social Fund, and running Women and Leadership Programmes and forums. In 1995, following a strategic review, it changed its name to the National Women's Council of Ireland.

== Legal rights ==
In 1973, the marriage bar was removed in Ireland. It had prevented any married woman from working in the public sector.

McGee v. The Attorney General (1973) was a case in the Irish Supreme Court in 1973 that referenced Article 41 of the Irish Constitution. It concerned Mary McGee, whose condition was such that she was advised by her physician that if she would become pregnant again her life would be endangered. She was then instructed to use a diaphragm and spermicidal jelly that was prescribed to her. However, Section 17 of the Criminal Law Amendment Act, 1935 prohibited her from acquiring the prescription. The Supreme Court ruled by a 4 to 1 majority in favor of her, after determining that married couples have the constitutional right to make private decisions on family planning.

Prior to the Family Home Protection Act 1976, a husband could sell or mortgage the family home without the consent or knowledge of his wife.

The Employment Equality Act 1977 prohibited most gender discrimination in employment.

The Health (Family Planning) Act 1979 allowed the sale of contraceptives in Ireland, upon presentation of a prescription.

A setback for second-wave feminism in Ireland occurred in 1983, when the Eighth Amendment of the Constitution of Ireland was passed, which recognized "the unborn" as having a right to life equal to that of "the mother". As such, abortions could only be legally conducted in Ireland if they occurred as the result of a medical intervention performed to save the life of the pregnant woman, and later due to legislation, this risk to the woman's life also included risk from suicide. However, in 2018 the Eighth Amendment was repealed by referendum.

Ireland acceded to the Convention on the Elimination of All Forms of Discrimination against Women in 1985.

The Health (Family Planning) (Amendment) Act 1985 allowed the sale of condoms and spermicides to people over 18 in Ireland, without requiring a prescription.

The Domicile and Recognition of Foreign Divorces Act 1986, abolished the dependent domicile of the wife.

The Family Law Act 1988 abolished the legal action for restitution of conjugal rights.

=== Employment ===
The marriage bar was introduced in Ireland in 1924 and prevented any married woman from working in the public sector. It was abolished in 1973.

The Employment Equality Act 1977 prohibited most gender discrimination in employment.

The Employment Equality Act 1998 upholds gender equality in employment.

In Ireland, the female employment rate stretched to 60.6% in 2007 before decreasing to 57.6% in 2009 and it continued to reduce over the next three years to rest at 55.2% by 2012. However, there was a small growth within the female employment rate to 55.9% in 2014, but men worked an average of 39.2 hours a week in paid employment in 2013 in contrast to women with 31.2 hours per week.

=== Marriage and divorce ===
Divorce was prohibited under the 1937 Constitution.

Prior to the Family Home Protection Act 1976, a husband could sell or mortgage the family home, without the consent or even knowledge of his wife. Prior to 1981, criminal conversation existed in Ireland, and meant a man could sue any person who had sexual relations with his wife, regardless of whether the wife consented, except that if the couple was already separated the husband could only sue if the separation was caused by the person he was suing. In Murphy v Attorney General [1982] IR 241, a married couple successfully challenged the constitutionality of sections 192-198 of the Income Tax Act 1967, which had declared the income of a married woman who was living with her husband was counted as her husband's income for tax purposes, rather than being counted as her own. Other important legal changes made to family law include the Domicile and Recognition of Foreign Divorces Act 1986, which abolished the dependent domicile of the wife; and the Family Law Act 1988, which abolished the legal action for restitution of conjugal rights. Marital rape was outlawed in 1990.

In 1996, Ireland repealed its constitutional prohibition of divorce; this was effected by the Fifteenth Amendment of the Constitution of Ireland, which was approved by referendum on 24 November 1995 and signed into law on 17 June 1996.

=== Contraception and abortion ===
Contraception in the Republic of Ireland was made illegal in 1935 under the Criminal Law (Amendment) Act 1935.

McGee v. The Attorney General was a case in the Irish Supreme Court in 1973 that referenced Article 41 of the Irish Constitution. It concerned Mary McGee, whose condition was such that she was advised by her physician that if she would become pregnant again her life would be endangered. She was then instructed to use a diaphragm and spermicidal jelly that was prescribed to her. However, Section 17 of the Criminal Law Amendment Act 1935 prohibited her from acquiring the prescription. The Supreme Court ruled by a 4 to 1 majority in her favor, after determining that married couples have the constitutional right to make private decisions on family planning.

In 1979, the Health (Family Planning) Act 1979 allowed the sale of contraceptives in Ireland, upon presentation of a prescription.

In 1983, the Eighth Amendment of the Constitution of Ireland was approved in a referendum, which recognized "the unborn" as having a right to life equal to that of "the mother". As such, abortions could only be legally conducted in Ireland if they occurred as the result of a medical intervention performed to save the life of the pregnant woman, and later due to legislation, this risk to the woman's life also included risk from suicide. In 2018 the Eighth Amendment was repealed by referendum.

In 1985, the Health (Family Planning) (Amendment) Act 1985 allowed the sale of condoms and spermicides to people over 18 in Ireland without having to present a prescription.

The X Case (1992), was a landmark Irish Supreme Court case which established the right of Irish women to an abortion if a pregnant woman's life was at risk because of pregnancy, including the risk of suicide. However, Supreme Court Justice Hugh O'Flaherty, now retired, said in an interview with The Irish Times that the X Case was "peculiar to its own particular facts", since X miscarried and did not have an abortion, and this renders the case moot in Irish law. In 1992, the Thirteenth Amendment of the Constitution of Ireland was passed, specifying that the protection of the right to life of the unborn does not limit freedom of travel in and out of the state. Also in 1992, the Fourteenth Amendment of the Constitution of Ireland was passed, specifying that the protection of the right to life of the unborn does not limit the right to distribute information about services in foreign countries.

In 1993, the Health (Family Planning) (Amendment) Act 1992 allowed the sale of contraceptives in Ireland without prescription.

In 2012 the death of Savita Halappanavar, four days after a complete miscarriage, on 28 October at University Hospital Galway in Ireland, led to nationwide protests—which spilled over into India, Britain and many other countries—calling for a review of the abortion laws in Ireland. Partly in response to the death of Savita Halappanavar, the Irish government introduced the Protection of Life During Pregnancy Act 2013; it was commenced on 1 January 2014. The Act defined the circumstances and processes within which abortion in Ireland could be legally performed. The provisions relating to suicide were the most contentious part of the bill. In 2013 Ireland's first legal abortion was carried out on a woman who had an unviable 18-week pregnancy and whose life was at risk.

In 2018, the Eighth Amendment of the Constitution of Ireland, which recognized "the unborn" as having a right to life equal to that of "the mother", was repealed by referendum. Feminist campaigning contributed to a positive outcome in the referendum, which resulted in a majority 'Yes' vote.

The Health (Regulation of Termination of Pregnancy) Act 2018 came into effect in 2019, and defines the circumstances and processes within which abortion may be legally performed in Ireland. This law permits terminations to be carried out up to 12 weeks of pregnancy; or where there is a risk to the life, or of serious harm to the health, of the pregnant woman; or where there is a risk to the life, or of serious harm to the health, of the pregnant woman in an emergency; or where there is a condition present which is likely to lead to the death of the fetus either before or within 28 days of birth.

=== Other women's rights issues ===
At first, Forty Foot was exclusively a male bathing place, and Sandycove Bathers Association, a men's swimming club, was established. Owing to its relative isolation and gender-restrictions it became a popular spot for nudists. On 24 July 1974, about a dozen women's rights activists ("Dublin City Women’s Invasion Force") went swimming, and sat with placards. Later, a few women swam nude in 1989. Now swimming is open to men, women, and children. In 2014, the Sandycove Bathers Association ended the ban on women club members, and they may now use the onsite changing rooms and clubhouse kitchen. The swimming club requests voluntary contributions for the upkeep of the area.

Ireland acceded to the Convention on the Elimination of All Forms of Discrimination against Women in 1985. The Criminal Justice (Female Genital Mutilation) Act 2012 bans female genital mutilation in Ireland.

== Women in Irish politics ==
In 1990, Mary Robinson was elected as the first female President of Ireland. The second female president, Mary McAleese, was president between 1997 and 2011.

In December 2008, Senator Ivana Bacik organised an event in Leinster House in which all the women elected to the Oireachtas over the years were honoured. 131 women have been elected to Dáil Éireann since 1918. In 1918, Constance Markievicz became the first woman elected to the House of Commons of the United Kingdom, although in line with Sinn Féin abstentionist policy she did not take her seat, and sat as a TD in Dáil Éireann in 1919.

Following the 2011 Irish general election and a re-shuffle in 2014, four women were appointed cabinet ministers (the highest number of women in senior ministerial positions ever in Ireland): Joan Burton, Frances Fitzgerald, Jan O'Sullivan and Heather Humphries. As of 2024, there are four women in cabinet.

Women are a small minority of political officeholders in Ireland. The main factors are the role of traditional Catholicism in Irish political culture and the role of localism in party politics. Ann Marie O'Brien has studied the women in the Irish Department of External Affairs associated with the League of Nations and United Nations, 1923–1976. She found that women had greater opportunities at the UN.

Mary Lou McDonald has been the Leader of the Opposition since June 2020.

== See also ==
- Irish mammy
