= Second-wave feminism =

Period of feminist activity, 1960s–1980s

Second-wave feminism was a period of feminist activity that began in the early 1960s and lasted roughly two decades, ending with the feminist sex wars in the early 1980s and being replaced by third-wave feminism in the early 1990s. It occurred throughout the Western world and aimed to increase women's equality by building on the feminist gains of the late 19th and early 20th centuries.

Second-wave feminism built on first-wave feminism and broadened the scope of debate to include a wider range of issues: sexuality, family, domesticity, the workplace, reproductive rights, de facto inequalities, and official legal inequalities. First-wave feminism typically advocated for formal equality and second-wave feminism advocated for substantive equality. It was a movement focused on critiquing patriarchal or male-dominated institutions and cultural practices throughout society. Second-wave feminism also brought attention to issues of domestic violence and marital rape, created rape crisis centers and women's shelters, and brought about changes in custody law and divorce law. Feminist-owned bookstores, credit unions, and restaurants were among the key meeting spaces and economic engines of the movement.

Because white feminists' voices have dominated the narrative from the early days of the movement, typical narratives of second-wave feminism focus on the sexism encountered by white middle- and upper-class women, with the absence of black and other racialized women and the experience of working-class women, although black women wrote and founded feminist publications and political activist groups throughout the movement, especially in the 1970s. At the same time, some narratives present a perspective that focuses on events in the United States to the exclusion of the experiences of other countries. Writers like Audre Lorde argued that this homogenized vision of "sisterhood" could not lead to real change because it ignored factors of one's identity such as race, sexuality, age, and class. The term "intersectionality" was coined in 1989 by Kimberlé Crenshaw at the end of the second wave. Many scholars believe that the beginning of third wave feminism was due to the problems of the second wave, rather than just another movement.

== Overview in the United States ==
The second wave of feminism in the United States came as a delayed reaction against the renewed domesticity of women after World War II: the late 1940s post-war boom, which was an era characterized by an unprecedented economic growth, a baby boom, a move to family-oriented suburbs and the ideal of companionate marriages. During this time, women did not tend to seek employment due to their engagement with domestic and household duties, which was seen as their primary duty but often left them isolated within the home and estranged from politics, economics, and law making. This life was clearly illustrated by the media of the time; for example television shows such as Father Knows Best and Leave It to Beaver idealized domesticity.

Some important events laid the groundwork for the second wave, specifically the work of French writer Simone de Beauvoir in the 1940s where she examined the notion of women being perceived as "other" in the patriarchal society. Simone de Beauvoir was an existentialist, meaning she believed in the existence of the individual person as a free and responsible agent determining their own development through acts of the will. She went on to conclude in her 1949 treatise The Second Sex that male-centered ideology was being accepted as a norm and enforced by the ongoing development of myths, and that the fact that women are capable of getting pregnant, lactating, and menstruating is in no way a valid cause or explanation to place them as the "second sex". This book was translated from French to English (with some of its text excised) and published in America in 1953.

In 1960, the Food and Drug Administration approved the combined oral contraceptive pill, which was made available in 1961. This made it easier for women to have careers without having to leave due to unexpectedly becoming pregnant. It also meant young couples would not be routinely forced into unwanted marriages due to accidental pregnancies.

Though it is widely accepted that the movement lasted from the 1960s into the early 1980s, the exact years of the movement are more difficult to pinpoint and are often disputed. The movement is usually believed to have begun in 1963, when Betty Friedan published The Feminine Mystique, and President John F. Kennedy's Presidential Commission on the Status of Women released its report on gender inequality.

External videos
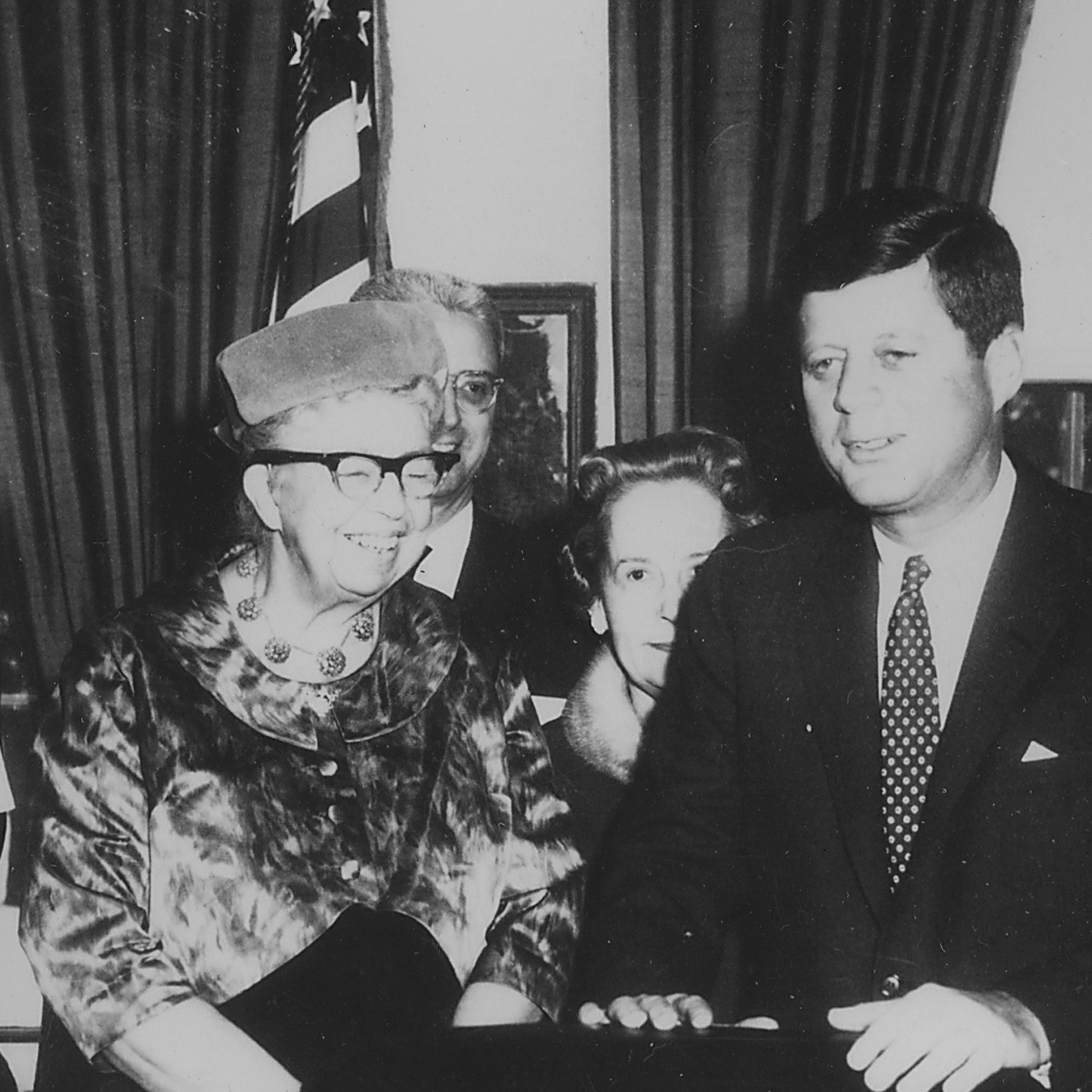
- Prospects of Mankind with Eleanor Roosevelt; What Status For Women?, 59:07, 1962. Eleanor Roosevelt, chair of the Presidential Commission on the Status of Women, interviews President John F. Kennedy, Secretary of Labor Arthur Goldberg and others, Open Vault from WGBH

The administration of President Kennedy made women's rights a key issue of the New Frontier, and named women (such as Esther Peterson) to many high-ranking posts in his administration. Kennedy also established a Presidential Commission on the Status of Women, chaired by Eleanor Roosevelt and comprising cabinet officials (including Peterson and Attorney General Robert F. Kennedy), senators, representatives, businesspeople, psychologists, sociologists, professors, activists, and public servants. The report recommended changing this inequality by providing paid maternity leave, greater access to education, and help with child care to women. However, the extent of Kennedy's support for women's rights has been disputed, with some alleging that a major factor in his support included his efforts to cover up his own womanizing ways. His wife Jackie was also known for presenting herself as a traditional wife, including in the time after Friedan published The Feminine Mystique.

There were other actions by women in wider society, presaging their wider engagement in politics which would come with the second wave. In 1961, 50,000 women in 60 cities, mobilized by Women Strike for Peace, protested above ground testing of nuclear bombs and tainted milk.

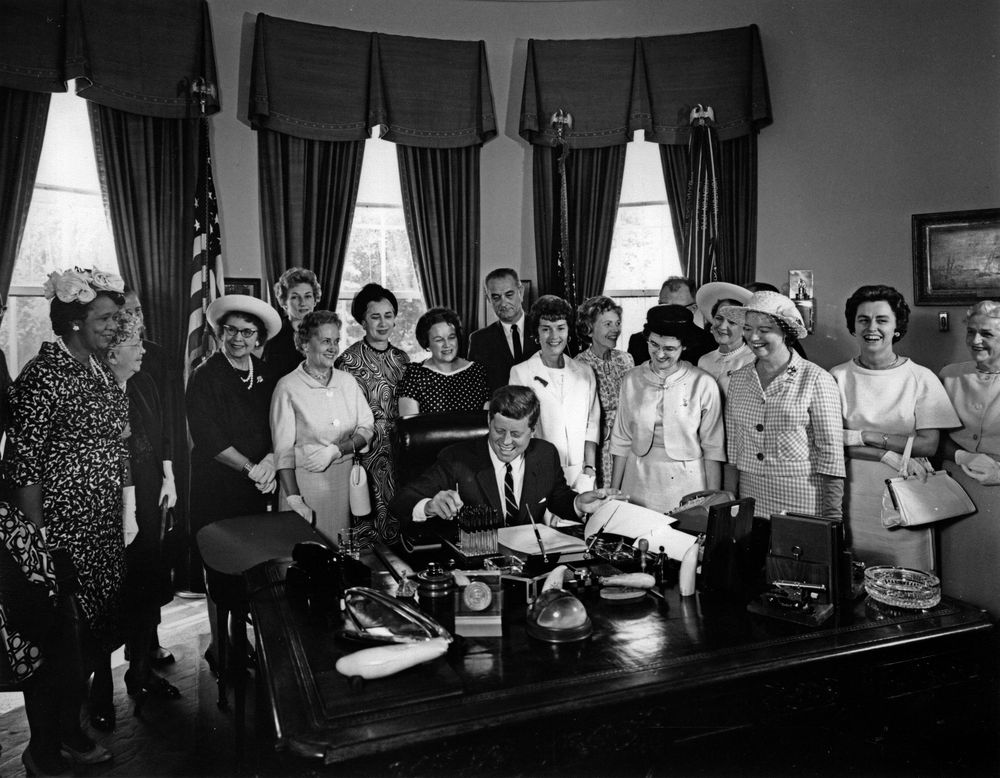
American Association of University Women members with President John F. Kennedy as he signs the Equal Pay Act into law in 1963

In 1963, Betty Friedan, influenced by Simone de Beauvoir's ground-breaking, feminist The Second Sex, wrote the bestselling book The Feminine Mystique. Discussing primarily white women, she explicitly objected to how women were depicted in the mainstream media, and how placing them at home (as 'housewives') limited their possibilities and wasted potential. She had helped conduct a very important survey using her old classmates from Smith College. This survey revealed that the women who work in the workforce while also playing a role in the home were more satisfied with their life compared with the women who stayed home. The women who stayed home showed feelings of agitation and sadness. She concluded that many of these unhappy women had immersed themselves in the idea that they should not have any ambitions outside their home. Friedan described this as "The Problem That Has No Name". The perfect nuclear family image depicted and strongly marketed at the time, she wrote, did not reflect happiness and was rather degrading for women. This book is widely credited with having begun second-wave feminism in the United States. The problems of the nuclear family in America are also heteronormative and is utilized often as a marketing strategy to sell goods within a capitalist driven society.

The report from the Presidential Commission on the Status of Women, along with Friedan's book, spoke to the discontent of many women (especially housewives) and led to the formation of local, state, and federal government women's groups along with many independent feminist organizations. Friedan was referencing a "movement" as early as 1964.

The movement grew with legal victories such as the Equal Pay Act of 1963, Title VII of the Civil Rights Act of 1964, and the Griswold v. Connecticut Supreme Court ruling of 1965. In 1966 Friedan joined other women and men to found the National Organization for Women (NOW); Friedan would be named as the organization's first president.

Despite the early successes NOW achieved under Friedan's leadership, her decision to pressure the Equal Employment Opportunity Commission (EEOC) to use Title VII of the 1964 Civil Rights Act to enforce more job opportunities among American women met with fierce opposition within the organization. Siding with arguments among several of the group's African-American members, many of NOW's leaders were convinced that the vast number of male African-Americans who lived below the poverty line were in need of more job opportunities than women within the middle and upper class. Friedan stepped down as president in 1969.

In 1963, freelance journalist Gloria Steinem gained widespread popularity among feminists after a diary she authored while working undercover as a Playboy Bunny waitress at the Playboy Club was published as a two-part feature in the May and June issues of Show. In her diary, Steinem alleged the club was mistreating its waitresses in order to gain male customers and exploited the Playboy Bunnies as symbols of male chauvinism, noting that the club's manual instructed the Bunnies that "there are many pleasing ways they can employ to stimulate the club's liquor volume". By 1968, Steinem had become arguably the most influential figure in the movement and support for legalized abortion and federally funded day-cares had become the two leading objectives for feminists.

Among the most significant legal victories of the movement after the formation of NOW were a 1967 Executive Order extending full affirmative action rights to women, a 1968 EEOC decision ruling illegal sex-segregated help wanted ads, Title IX and the Women's Educational Equity Act (1972 and 1974, respectively, educational equality), Title X (1970, health and family planning), the Equal Credit Opportunity Act (1974), the Pregnancy Discrimination Act of 1978, the outlawing of marital rape (although not outlawed in all states until 1993), and the legalization of no-fault divorce (although not legalized in all states until 2010), a 1975 law requiring the U.S. Military Academies to admit women, and many Supreme Court cases such as Reed v. Reed of 1971 and Roe v. Wade of 1973. However, the changing of social attitudes towards women is usually considered the greatest success of the women's movement. In January 2013, US Secretary of Defense Leon Panetta announced that the longtime ban on women serving in US military combat roles had been lifted.

In 2013, the US Department of Defense (DoD) announced their plan to integrate women into all combat positions by 2016.

Second-wave feminism also affected other movements, such as the civil rights movement and the student's rights movement, as women sought equality within them. In 1965 in "Sex and Caste", a reworking of a memo they had written as staffers in civil-rights organizations SNCC, Casey Hayden and Mary King proposed that "assumptions of male superiority are as widespread and deep rooted and every much as crippling to the woman as the assumptions of white supremacy are to the Negro", and that in the movement, as in society, women can find themselves "caught up in a common-law caste system".

In June 1967, Jo Freeman attended a "free school" course on women at the University of Chicago led by Heather Booth and Naomi Weisstein. She invited them to organize a woman's workshop at the then-forthcoming National Conference of New Politics (NCNP), to be held over Labor Day weekend 1967 in Chicago. At that conference, a woman's caucus was formed (led by Freeman and Shulamith Firestone), who tried to present their own demands to the plenary session. However, the women were told their resolution was not important enough for a floor discussion, and when through threatening to tie up the convention with procedural motions they succeeded in having their statement tacked to the end of the agenda, it was never discussed. When the National Conference for New Politics (NCNP) Director William F. Pepper refused to recognize any of the women waiting to speak and instead called on someone to speak about American Indians, five women, including Firestone, rushed the podium demanding to know why. But Willam F. Pepper allegedly patted Firestone on the head and said, "Move on little girl; we have more important issues to talk about here than women's liberation", or possibly, "Cool down, little girl. We have more important things to talk about than women's problems." Freeman and Firestone called a meeting of the women who had been at the "free school" course and the women's workshop at the conference; this became the first Chicago women's liberation group. It was known as the Westside group because it met weekly in Freeman's apartment on Chicago's west side. After a few months, Freeman started a newsletter which she called Voice of the women's liberation movement. It circulated all over the country (and in a few foreign countries), giving the new movement of women's liberation its name. Many of the women in the Westside group went on to start other feminist organizations, including the Chicago Women's Liberation Union.

In 1968, an SDS organizer at the University of Washington told a meeting about white college men working with poor white men, and "[h]e noted that sometimes after analyzing societal ills, the men shared leisure time by 'balling a chick together.' He pointed out that such activities did much to enhance the political consciousness of poor white youth. A woman in the audience asked, 'And what did it do for the consciousness of the chick?'" (Hole, Judith, and Ellen Levine, Rebirth of Feminism, 1971, pg. 120). After the meeting, a handful of women formed Seattle's first women's liberation group.

The term "second-wave feminism" itself was brought into common parlance by American journalist Martha Lear in a March 1968 New York Times Magazine article titled "The Second Feminist Wave: What Do These Women Want?". She wrote, "Proponents call it the Second Feminist Wave, the first having ebbed after the glorious victory of suffrage and disappeared, finally, into the great sandbar of Togetherness." The term wave helped link the generation of suffragettes who fought for legal rights to the feminists of the 1960s and '70s. It is now used to not only distinguish the different priorities in feminism throughout the years but to establish an overarching fight for equity and equality as a way of understanding its history. This metaphor however is critiqued by feminists as it generalizes the contradictions within the movement and the different beliefs that feminists hold.

Some black feminists who were active in the early second-wave feminism include civil rights lawyer and author Florynce Kennedy, who co-authored one of the first books on abortion, 1971's Abortion Rap; Cellestine Ware, of New York's Stanton-Anthony Brigade; and Patricia Robinson. These women "tried to show the connections between racism and male dominance" in society.

The Indochinese Women's Conferences (IWC) in Vancouver and Toronto in 1971, demonstrated the interest of a multitude of women's groups in the Vietnam Antiwar movement. Lesbian groups, women of color, and Vietnamese groups saw their interests mirrored in the anti-imperialist spirit of the conference. Although the IWC used a Canadian venue, membership was primarily composed of American groups.

The ideals of liberal feminism worked towards the idea of women's equality with that of men because liberal feminists felt that women and men have the same intrinsic capabilities and that society has socialized certain skills out. This elimination of difference works to erase sexism by working within a pre-existing system of oppression rather than challenging the system itself. Working towards equality preserves a system by giving everyone the same opportunities regardless of their privilege whereas the framework of equity would address problems in society and find solutions to target the problem at hand.

The printed word was a significant tool for second-wave feminists, and the late 1960s and 1970s saw a renaissance of feminist periodicals and presses established in the United States and internationally. More than five hundred feminist periodicals were published between 1968 and 1974. Historians of the second-wave assert that “more than any other movement in history, feminism has been identified with publishing.” Feminist separatists and lesbian feminists were particularly active in the women in print movement, which attempted to establish autonomous communications networks of feminist publications, presses, and bookstores created by and for women. Women in the movement used publications for consciousness raising, reclaiming and reprinting earlier women's writings, self-expression, education, and movement coordination. Feminist presses provided an outlet for women's writings without the censorship and gatekeeping of traditional publishers. Periodicals and presses established during this period included Virago Press, Naiad Press, Big Mama Rag, Lavender Woman, and Spare Rib. Feminist writings during the second-wave influenced the emergence of women's studies as a legitimate field of study. In 1970, San Diego State University was the first university in the United States to offer a selection of women's studies courses.

The 1977 National Women's Conference in Houston, Texas, presented an opportunity for women's liberation groups to address a multitude of women's issues. At the conference, delegates from around the country gathered to create a National Plan of Action, which offered 26 planks on matters such as women's health, women's employment, and child care.

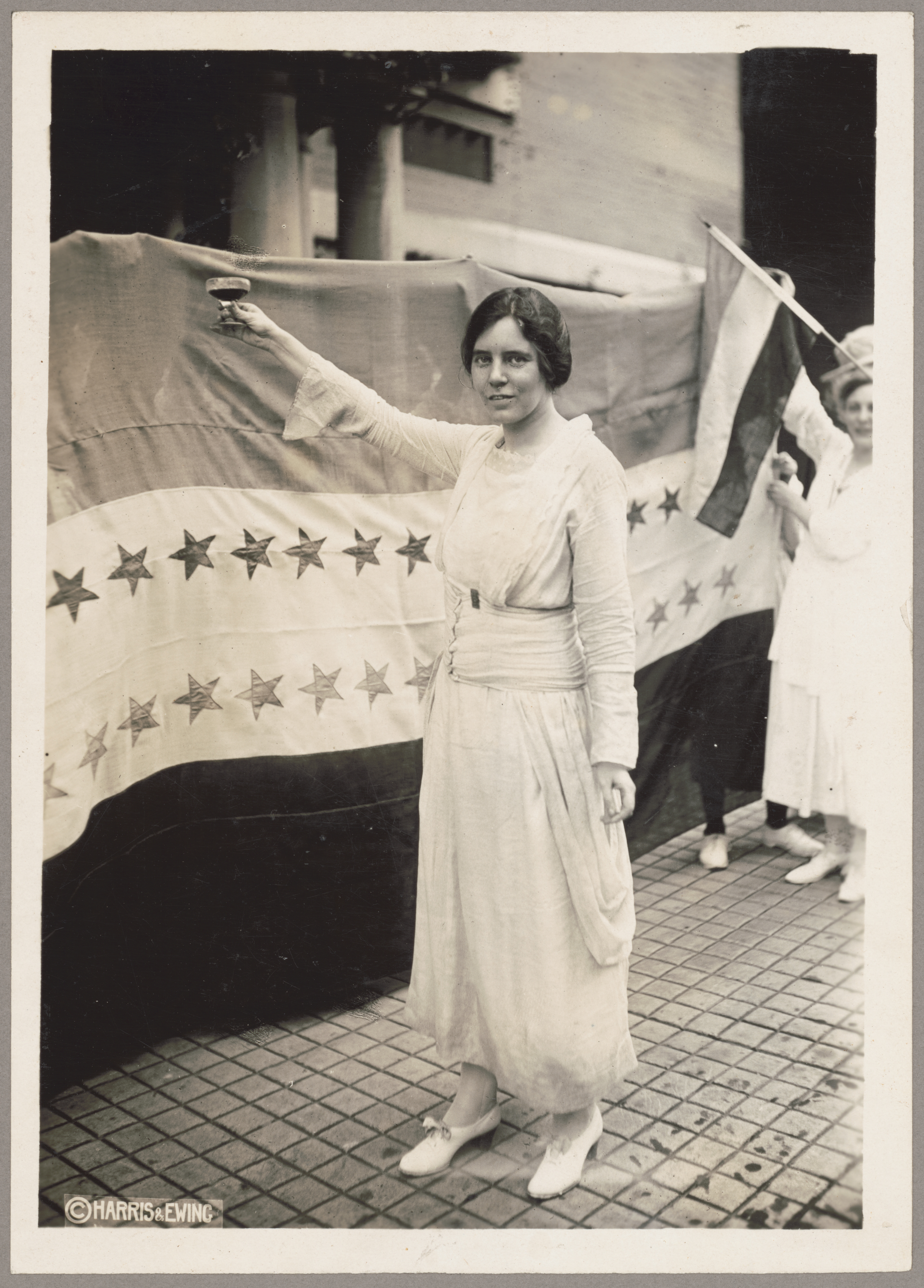
Alice Paul wrote the Equal Rights Amendment, whose passage became an unachieved goal of the feminist movement in the 1970s.

By the early 1980s, it was largely perceived that women had met their goals and succeeded in changing social attitudes towards gender roles, repealing oppressive laws that were based on sex, integrating the "boys' clubs" such as military academies, the United States Armed Forces, NASA, single-sex colleges, men's clubs, and the Supreme Court, and making gender discrimination illegal. However, in 1982, adding the Equal Rights Amendment to the United States Constitution failed, having been ratified by only 35 states, leaving it three states short of ratification.

Second-wave feminism was largely successful, with the failure of the ratification of the Equal Rights Amendment and Nixon's veto of the Comprehensive Child Development Bill of 1972 (which would have provided a multibillion-dollar national day care system) the only major legislative defeats. Efforts to ratify the Equal Rights Amendment have continued. Ten states have adopted constitutions or constitutional amendments providing that equal rights under the law shall not be denied because of sex, and most of these provisions mirror the broad language of the Equal Rights Amendment. Furthermore, many women's groups are still active and are major political forces. As of 2011, more women earn bachelor's degrees than men, half of the Ivy League presidents are women, the numbers of women in government and traditionally male-dominated fields have dramatically increased, and in 2009 the percentage of women in the American workforce temporarily surpassed that of men. The salary of the average American woman has also increased over time, although as of 2008 it is only 77% of the average man's salary, a phenomenon often referred to as the gender pay gap. Whether this is due to discrimination is very hotly disputed, however economists and sociologists have provided evidence to that effect.

The movement was also fought alongside the civil rights, Black power, Chicano and gay liberation movements, where many feminists were active participants throughout these fights for a voice in the United States.

Many historians view the second-wave feminist era in America as ending in the early 1980s with intra-feminism disputes of the feminist sex wars over issues such as sexuality and pornography, which ushered in the era of third-wave feminism in the early 1990s.

== "The Feminine Mystique" ==
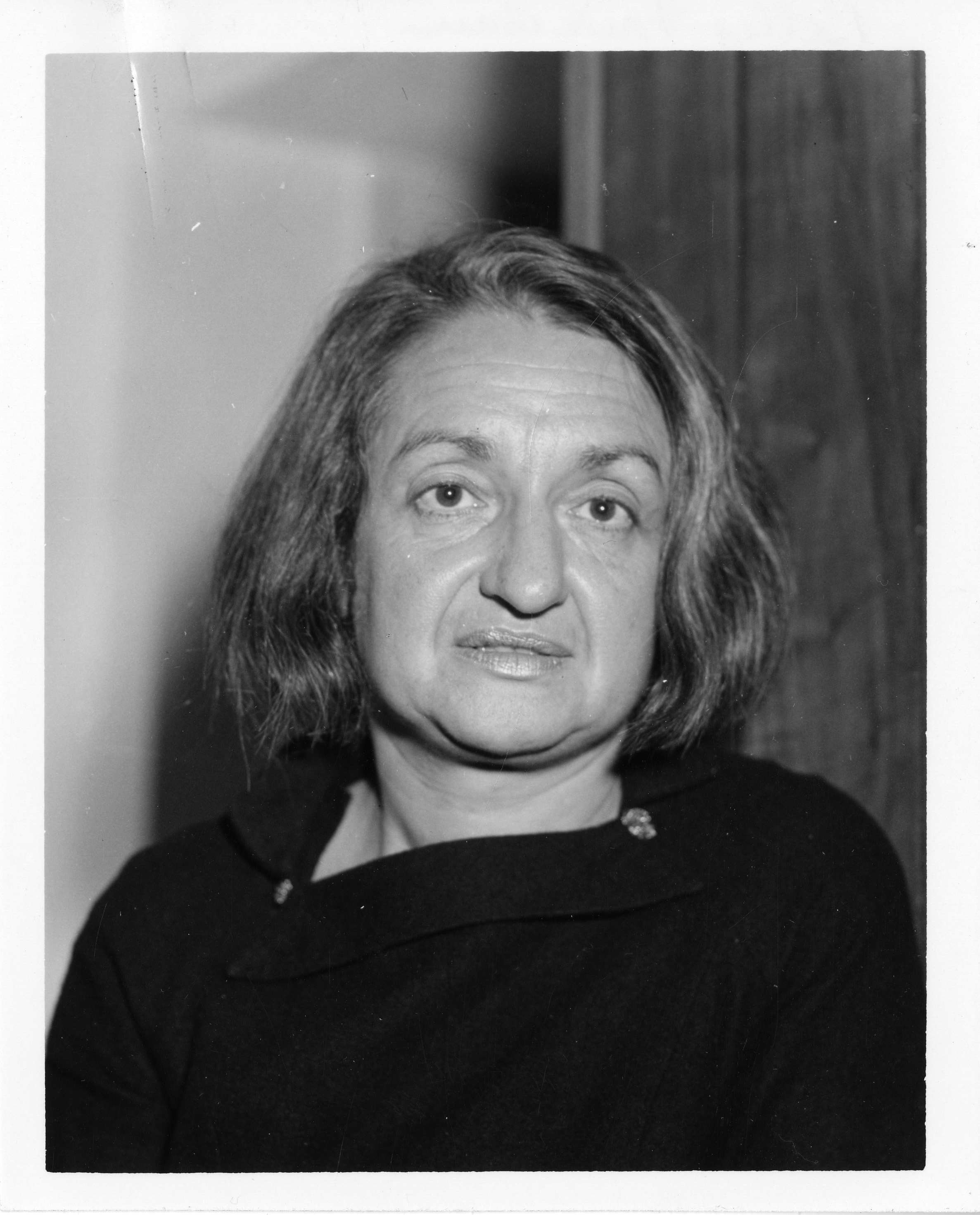
Betty Friedan published The Feminine Mystique in 1963

In 1963, Betty Friedan published her book The Feminine Mystique addressing the issues that many white-middle class housewives were facing at the time. Friedan's work catalyzed the second wave in the United States, and in particular the liberal feminist sector of the movement. Her work gave these women the language to be able to articulate the dissatisfaction they felt in their role of being a mother and a wife. Friedan coined the term "Feminine Mystique" to recognize the romanticization of being a "happy housewife" perpetuated by media such as TV and magazines and that women should feel satisfied with housework, marriage, child-rearing, and passivity around the home unit. Women were always seen as relational to the other people in their life and were not encouraged to have their own identity as a person with their own life and interests beyond the home. They are either seen as someone's wife or someone's mother. Women who read her work were able to realize that they were not alone in their feelings. Friedan's work only brought to life a problem experienced by a certain group of women however which left out women of color and who belonged to other marginalized groups since many of these people had to work outside the home for a source of income.

== Overview outside the United States ==
In 1967, at the International Alliance of Women Congress held in London, delegates were made aware of an initiative by the UN Commission on the Status of Women to study and evaluate the situation of women in their countries. Many organizations and NGOs like the Association of Business and Professional Women, Soroptimists Clubs, as well as teaching and nursing associations developed committees in response to the initiative to prepare evaluations on the conditions of women and urge their governments to establish National Commissions on the Status of Women.

In Turkey and Israel, second-wave feminism began in the 1980s.

=== Australia ===
The Regatta Hotel protest in 1965 that challenged the ban on women being served drinks in public bars in Queensland marked the beginning of second wave feminist action in Brisbane and gained significant media coverage. Kay Saunders notes, "when you use the term ‘‘second wave’’ it actually started in Brisbane." In 1970 the law was changed to allow women to be served drinks in public bars in Queensland.

=== Finland ===
In the 1960s, feminism again became a part of debate in Finland after the publication of Anna-Liisa Sysiharjun's Home, Equality and Work (1960) and Elina Haavio-Mannilan's Suomalainen nainen ja mies (1968), and the student feminist group Yhdistys 9 (1966–1970) addressed issues such as the need for free abortions.

In 1970, there was a brief but strong women's movement belonging to second wave feminism. Rape in marriage was not considered a crime at the time, and victims of domestic violence had few places to go. Feminists also fought for a day-care system that would be open to the public, and for the right for not only paid maternity leave but also paternity leave. Today there is a 263-day parental leave in Finland. It is illegal to discriminate against women in the workforce. Two feminist groups were created to help the movement: The Marxist-Feminists (Marxist-Feministerna) and The Red Women (Rödkäringarna, Puna-akat). The feminists in Finland were inspired by other European countries such as Sweden and Switzerland. Other important groups for the Finnish women in the 1970s include Unioni and The Feminists (Feministit-Feministerna).

=== Germany ===
During the 1960s, several German feminist groups were founded, which were characterized as the second wave.

=== Ireland ===
The Irish Women's Liberation Movement was an alliance of a group of Irish women who were concerned about the sexism within Ireland both socially and legally. They first began after a meeting in Dublin's Bewley's Cafe on Grafton Street in 1970. They later had their meetings in Margaret Gaj's restaurant on Baggot Street every Monday. The group was short-lived, but influential. It was initially started with twelve women, most of whom were journalists. One of the co-founders was June Levine.

In 1971, a group of Irish feminists (including June Levine, Mary Kenny, Nell McCafferty, Máirín Johnston, and other members of the Irish Women's Liberation Movement) travelled to Belfast, Northern Ireland, on the so-called "Contraceptive Train" and returned with condoms, which were then illegal in Ireland.

In 1973, a group of feminists, chaired by Hilda Tweedy of the Irish Housewives Association, set up the Council for the Status of Women, with the goal of gaining equality for women. It was an umbrella body for women's groups. During the 1990s the council's activities included supporting projects funded by the European Social Fund, and running Women and Leadership Programmes and forums. In 1995, following a strategic review, it changed its name to the National Women's Council of Ireland.

=== Spain ===
The 1960s in Spain saw a generational shift in Spanish feminist in response to other changes in Spanish society. This included increased emigration and tourism (resulting in the spread of ideas from the rest of the world), greater opportunities in education and employment for women and major economic reforms. Feminism in the late Franco period and early transition period was not unified. It had many different political dimensions, however, they all shared a belief in the need for greater equality for women in Spain and a desire to defend the rights of women. Feminism moved from being about the individual to being about the collective. It was during this period that second-wave feminism arrived in Spain.

Second-wave Spanish feminism was about the struggle for the rights of women in the context of the dictatorship. PCE would start in 1965 to promote this movement with MDM, creating a feminist political orientation around building solidarity for women and assisting imprisoned political figures. MDM launched its movement in Madrid by establishing associations among the housewives of the Tetuán and Getafe in 1969. In 1972, Asociación Castellana de Amas de Casa y Consumidora was created to widen the group's ability to attract members.

Second-wave feminism entered the Spanish comic community by the early 1970s. It was manifested in Spanish comics in two ways. The first was that it increased the number of women involved in comics production as writers and artists. The second was it transformed how female characters were portrayed, making women less passive and less likely to be purely sexual beings.

=== Sweden ===
See also Feminism in Sweden

In Sweden, second-wave feminism is mostly associated with Group 8, a feminist organization which was founded by eight women in Stockholm in 1968.

The organization took up various feminist issues such as demands for expansions of kindergartens, 6-hour working day, equal pay for equal work and opposition to pornography. Initially based in Stockholm, local groups were founded throughout the country. The influence of Group 8 on feminism in Sweden is still prevalent.

=== The Netherlands ===
In 1967, "The Discontent of Women", by Joke Kool-Smits, was published; the publication of this essay is often regarded as the start of second-wave feminism in the Netherlands. In this essay, Smit describes the frustration of married women, saying they are fed up being solely mothers and housewives.

== Beginning and consciousness raising ==
The beginnings of second-wave feminism can be studied by looking at the two branches that the movement formed in: the liberal feminists and the radical feminists. The liberal feminists, led by figures such as Betty Friedan and Gloria Steinem advocated for federal legislation to be passed that would promote and enhance the personal and professional lives of women. On the other hand, radical feminists, such as Casey Hayden and Mary King, adopted the skills and lessons that they had learned from their work with student organizations such as the Students for a Democratic Society and Student Nonviolent Coordinating Committee and created a platform to speak on the violent and sexist issues women faced while working with the larger Civil Rights Movement.

=== The liberal feminist movement ===
After being removed from the workforce, by either personal or social pressures, many women in the post-war America returned to the home or were placed into female only jobs in the service sector. After the publication of Friedan's The Feminine Mystique in 1963, many women connected to the feeling of isolation and dissatisfaction that the book detailed. The book itself, however, was not a call to action, but rather a plea for self-realization and consciousness raising among middle-class women throughout America. Many of these women organized to form the National Organization for Women in 1966, whose "Statement of Purpose" declared that the right women had to equality was one small part of the nationwide civil rights revolution that was happening during the 1960s.

=== The radical feminist movement ===
Women who favoured radical feminism collectively spoke of being forced to remain silent and obedient to male leaders in New Left organizations. They spoke out about how they were not only told to do clerical work such as stuffing envelopes and typing speeches, but there was also an expectation for them to sleep with the male activists that they worked with. While these acts of sexual harassment took place, the young women were neglected their right to have their own needs and desires recognized by their male cohorts. Many radical feminists had learned from these organizations how to think radically about their self-worth and importance, and applied these lessons in the relationships they had with each other.

== Businesses ==
Feminist activists have established a range of feminist businesses, including women's bookstores, feminist credit unions, feminist presses, feminist mail-order catalogs, feminist restaurants, and feminist record labels. These businesses flourished as part of the second and third waves of feminism in the 1970s, 1980s, and 1990s.

In West Berlin sixteen projects emerged within three years (1974–76) all without state funding (except the women's shelter). Many of those new concepts the social economy picked up later, some are still run autonomously today.

== Music and popular culture ==
Second-wave feminists viewed popular culture as sexist, and created pop culture of their own to counteract this. "One project of second wave feminism was to create 'positive' images of women, to act as a counterweight to the dominant images circulating in popular culture and to raise women's consciousness of their oppressions."

=== "I Am Woman" ===
Australian artist Helen Reddy's 1972 song "I Am Woman" played a large role in popular culture and became a feminist anthem; Reddy came to be known as a "feminist poster girl" or a "feminist icon". Reddy told interviewers that the song was a "song of pride about being a woman". A few weeks after "I Am Woman" entered the charts, radio stations refused to play it. Some music critics and radio stations believed the song represented "all that is silly in the Women's Lib Movement". Helen Reddy then began performing the song on numerous television variety shows. As the song gained popularity, women began calling radio stations and requesting to hear "I Am Woman" played. The song re-entered the charts and reached number one in December 1972.

"I Am Woman" also became a protest song that women sang at feminist rallies and protests.

=== Olivia Records ===
In 1973, a group of five feminists created the first women's owned-and-operated record label, called Olivia Records. They created the record label because they were frustrated that major labels were slow to add female artists to their rosters. One of Olivia's founders, Judy Dlugacz, said that, "It was a chance to create opportunities for women artists within an industry which at that time had few." Initially, they had a budget of $4,000, and relied on donations to keep Olivia Records alive. With these donations, Olivia Records created their first LP, an album of feminist songs entitled I Know You Know. The record label originally relied on volunteers and feminist bookstores to distribute their records, but after a few years their records began to be sold in mainstream record stores.

Olivia Records was so successful that the company relocated from Washington, D.C., to Los Angeles in 1975. Olivia Records released several records and albums, and their popularity grew. As their popularity grew, an alternative, specialized music industry grew around it. This type of music was initially referred to as "lesbian music" but came to be known as "women's music". However, although Olivia Records was initially meant for women, in the 1980s it tried to move away from that stereotype and encouraged men to listen to their music as well.

=== Women's music ===
Women's music consisted of female musicians who combined music with politics to express feminist ideals. Cities throughout the United States began to hold Women's Music Festivals, all consisting of female artists singing their own songs about personal experiences. The first Women's Music Festival was held in 1974 at the University of Illinois. In 1979, the Michigan Womyn's Music Festival attracted 10,000 women from across America. These festivals encouraged already-famous female singers, such as Laura Nyro and Ellen McIllwaine, to begin writing and producing their own songs instead of going through a major record label. Many women began performing hard rock music, a traditionally male-dominated genre. One of the most successful examples included the sisters Ann and Nancy Wilson, who formed the famous hard rock band Heart.

=== Film ===
==== German-speaking Europe ====
The Deutsche Film- und Fernsehakademie Berlin gave women a chance in film in Germany: from 1968 on one third of the students were female. Some of them - pioneers of the women's movement - produced feminist feature films: Helke Sander in 1971 produced Eine Prämie für Irene [A Reward for Irene], and Cristina Perincioli (although she was Swiss not German) in 1971 produced Für Frauen – 1.Kap [For Women – 1st Chapter].

In West Germany Helma Sanders-Brahms and Claudia von Alemann produced feminist documentaries from 1970 on.

In 1973, Claudia von Alemann and Helke Sander organized the 1. Internationale Frauen-Filmseminar in Berlin.

In 1974, Helke Sander founded the journal Frauen und Film – a first feminist film journal, which she edited until 1981.

In the 1970s in West Germany, women directors produced a whole series of Frauenfilm - films focusing on women's personal emancipation. In the 1980s the Goethe Institute brought a collection of German women's films to every corner of the world. "...here the term 'feminist filmmaking' does function to point to a filmmaking practice defining itself outside the masculine mirror. German feminism is one of the most active women's movements in Europe. It has gained access to television; engendered a spectrum of journals, a publishing house and a summer women's university in Berlin; inspired a whole group of filmmakers; ..." writes Marc Silberman in Jump Cut. But most of the women filmmakers did not see themselves as feminists, except Helke Sander and Cristina Perincioli. Perincioli stated in an interview: "Fight first ... before making beautiful art". There, she explains how she develops and shoots the film together with the women concerned: saleswomen, battered wives - and why she prefers to work with an all female team. Camera women were still so rare in the 1970 that she had to find them in Denmark and France. Working with an all women film crew Perincioli encouraged women to learn these then male dominated professions.

===== Association of women filmworkers of Germany =====
In 1979, German women filmworkers formed the Association of women filmworkers which was active for a few years. In 2014, a new attempt with Proquote Film (then as Proquote Regie) turned out to be successful and effective. A study by the University of Rostock shows that 42% of the graduates of film schools are female, but only 22% of the German feature films are staged by a woman director and are usually financially worse equipped. Similarly, women are disadvantaged in the other male-dominated film trades, where men even without education are preferred to the female graduates. The initiative points out that the introduction of a quota system in Sweden has brought the proportion of women in key positions in film production around the same as the population share. As a result, the Swedish initiative calls also for a parity of film funding bodies and the implementation of a gradual women's quota for the allocation of film and television directing jobs in order to achieve a gender-equitable distribution. This should reflect the plurality of a modern society, because diversity can not be guaranteed if more than 80% of all films are produced by men. ProQuote Film is the third initiative with which women with a high share in their industry are fighting for more female executives and financial resources (see Pro Quote Medien (2012) and Quote Medizin).

==== United States ====
In the US, both the creation and subjects of motion pictures began to reflect second-wave feminist ideals, leading to the development of feminist film theory. In the late 1970s and early 1980s, female filmmakers that were involved in part of the new wave of feminist film included Joan Micklin Silver (Between the Lines), Claudia Weill (Girlfriends), Stephanie Rothman, and Susan Seidelman (Smithereens, Desperately Seeking Susan). Other notable films that explored feminist subject matters that were made at this time include the 1968 film Rosemary's Baby and the 1971 film adaptation of Lois Gould's 1970 novel Such Good Friends.

The 2014 documentary She's Beautiful When She's Angry was the first documentary film to cover feminism's second wave.

=== Art ===
Art during second wave feminism also flourished. Known as the Feminist art movement, the works and artists during the movement fought to give themselves representation in a field dominated by white men. Their works came in all different mediums and aimed to end oppression, challenge gender norms, and highlight the fraught art industry rooted in white patriarchy. Linda Nochlin's essay "Why Have There Been No Great Women Artists?" (1971) has become one of the most influential works that came from the movement and questions gender stereotypes for women in the art field as well as the definition of art as a whole.

== Social changes ==
=== Use of birth control ===
Finding a need to talk about the advantage of the Food and Drug Administration passing their approval for the use of birth control in 1960, liberal feminists took action in creating panels and workshops with the goal to promote consciousness raising among sexually active women. These workshops also brought attention to issues such as venereal diseases and safe abortion. Radical feminists also joined this push to raise awareness among sexually active women. While supporting the "Free Love Movement" of the late 1960s and early 1970s, young women on college campuses distributed pamphlets on birth control, sexual diseases, abortion, and cohabitation.

While white women were concerned with obtaining birth control for all, women of color were at risk of sterilization because of these same medical and social advances: "Native American, African American, and Latina groups documented and publicized sterilization abuses in their communities in the 1960s and 70s, showing that women had been sterilized without their knowledge or consent... In the 1970s, a group of women... founded the Committee to End Sterilization Abuse (CESA) to stop this racist population control policy begun by the federal government in the 1940s – a policy that had resulted in the sterilization of over one-third of all women of child-bearing age in Puerto Rico." The use of forced sterilization disproportionately affected women of color and women from lower socioeconomic statuses. Sterilization was often done under the ideology of eugenics. Thirty states within the United States authorized legal sterilizations under eugenic sciences.

=== Domestic violence and sexual harassment ===
The second-wave feminist movement also took a strong stance against physical violence and sexual assault in both the home and the workplace. In 1968, NOW successfully lobbied the Equal Employment Opportunity Commission to pass an amendment to Title VII of the Civil Rights Act of 1964, which prevented discrimination based on sex in the workplace. This attention to women's rights in the workplace also prompted the EEOC to add sexual harassment to its "Guidelines on Discrimination", therefore giving women the right to report their bosses and coworkers for acts of sexual assault.

Domestic violence, such as battery and rape, were rampant in post-war America. Married women were often abused by their husbands, and as late as 1975 domestic battery and rape were both socially acceptable and legal as women were seen to be the possessions of their husbands. Because of activists in the second-wave feminist movement, and the local law enforcement agencies that they worked with, by 1982 three hundred shelters and forty-eight state coalitions had been established to provide protection and services for women who had been abused by male figures in their lives.

== Sex and sexuality ==
During the time of the second wave, with fighting against the stereotype that women are supposed to be passive and submissive, this topic extended to women's pleasure regarding sex, emotion, and intimacy. In anatomy textbooks and works by authors including neurologist Sigmund Freud before the 1950s, women's bodies in regards to sexuality and sexual intercourse were left out of the public eye and were instead centered around male pleasure. Through works like Anne Koedt's "The Myth of the Vaginal Orgasm" written in 1970, people could begin to break down the societal norm for male pleasure with a focus on the vaginal orgasm in heterosexual relationships.

Emily Stoper and Roberta Ann Johnson write that American second-wave feminists in the 1970s believed women's nature was morally superior to that of men. However, although writing that this "has produced certain political benefits", Stoper and Johnson argue that the idea of female superiority limits women in politics and makes them psychologically weaker.

In 1978, author Audre Lorde also discussed this in her essay "Uses of the Erotic: The Erotic as Power". Lorde believed that the erotic is something that has been suppressed in women in order to keep them from feeling to their full potential in hopes of keeping them subservient. It is labeled as irrational and trivial so that women do not understand its full potential for power. Pornography to Lorde suppresses genuine emotion as it is only about the stimulation of the senses.

The magazine "Cosmopolitan" also decided to rebrand their company as a women's magazine in 1965 coinciding with the second wave feminist movement. The editor in chief, Helen Gurley Brown, dedicated the magazine to focus on the modern, working, and independent woman so that they can find independence in themselves and embrace their sexuality. The articles are however criticized by many for their unrealistic portrayal of women and how ultimately, the women curated by the magazine end up playing into men's fantasies about what a woman should be. It is another form of control and rules for women to abide by. This kind of criticism was especially touched on by Naomi Wolf's "The Beauty Myth" in 1990.

With emotion and the ability to be able to feel to the fullest extent for women, that comes with the idea of separate space. The need to find women-only space so that feminists can organize and work towards liberation. In advocating for these spaces, many accused them of being "radical - separatists" and/or "lesbians". Homophobia was also, and still is, very prevalent and while the intersectional experiences were not completely researched until years later, homophobia and sexism were always interconnected. With the gay liberation movement and the second wave, people were afraid of the questions that both movements addressed that would change the foundation of a heterosexual, oppressive patriarchy. Lorde speaks of this fear in her work "Age, Race, Class, and Sex: Women Redefining Difference" (1980) where she writes about how lesbians challenge the patriarchy and heteronormative society by creating a fear of a society that is no longer dependent on men.

== Education ==
=== Coeducation ===
One debate which developed in the United States during this time period revolved around the question of coeducation. Most men's colleges in the United States adopted coeducation, often by merging with women's colleges. In addition, some women's colleges adopted coeducation, while others maintained a single-sex student body.

==== Seven Sisters Colleges ====
Two of the Seven Sister colleges made transitions during and after the 1960s. The first, Radcliffe College, merged with Harvard University. Beginning in 1963, students at Radcliffe received Harvard diplomas signed by the presidents of Radcliffe and Harvard and joint commencement exercises began in 1970. The same year, several Harvard and Radcliffe dormitories began swapping students experimentally and in 1972 full co-residence was instituted. The departments of athletics of both schools merged shortly thereafter. In 1977, Harvard and Radcliffe signed an agreement which put undergraduate women entirely in Harvard College. In 1999, Radcliffe College was dissolved and Harvard University assumed full responsibility over the affairs of female undergraduates. Radcliffe is now the Radcliffe Institute for Advanced Study in Women's Studies at Harvard University.

The second, Vassar College, declined an offer to merge with Yale University and instead became coeducational in 1969.

The remaining Seven Sisters decided against coeducation. Mount Holyoke College engaged in a lengthy debate under the presidency of David Truman over the issue of coeducation. On November 6, 1971, "after reviewing an exhaustive study on coeducation, the board of trustees decided unanimously that Mount Holyoke should remain a women's college, and a group of faculty was charged with recommending curricular changes that would support the decision." Smith College also made a similar decision in 1971.

In 1969, Bryn Mawr College and Haverford College (then all male) developed a system of sharing residential colleges. When Haverford became coeducational in 1980, Bryn Mawr discussed the possibly of coeducation as well, but decided against it. In 1983, Columbia University began admitting women after a decade of failed negotiations with Barnard College for a merger along the lines of Harvard and Radcliffe (Barnard has been affiliated with Columbia since 1900, but it continues to be independently governed). Wellesley College also decided against coeducation during this time.

==== Mississippi University for Women ====
In 1982, in a 5–4 decision, the U.S. Supreme Court ruled in Mississippi University for Women v. Hogan that the Mississippi University for Women would be in violation of the Fourteenth Amendment's Equal Protection Clause if it denied admission to its nursing program on the basis of gender. Mississippi University for Women, the first public or government institution for women in the United States, changed its admissions policies and became coeducational after the ruling.

In what was her first opinion written for the Supreme Court, Justice Sandra Day O'Connor stated, "In limited circumstances, a gender-based classification favoring one sex can be justified if it intentionally and directly assists members of the sex that is disproportionately burdened." She went on to point out that there are a disproportionate number of women who are nurses, and that denying admission to men "lends credibility to the old view that women, not men, should become nurses, and makes the assumption that nursing is a field for women a self-fulfilling prophecy".

In the dissenting opinions, Justices Harry A. Blackmun, Warren E. Burger, Lewis F. Powell, Jr., and William H. Rehnquist suggested that the result of this ruling would be the elimination of publicly supported single-sex educational opportunities. This suggestion has proven to be accurate as there are no public women's colleges in the United States today and, as a result of United States v. Virginia, the last all-male public university in the United States, Virginia Military Institute, was required to admit women. The ruling did not require the university to change its name to reflect its coeducational status and it continues a tradition of academic and leadership development for women by providing liberal arts and professional education to women and men.

==== Mills College ====
On May 3, 1990, the Trustees of Mills College announced that they had voted to admit male students. This decision led to a two-week student and staff strike, accompanied by numerous displays of nonviolent protests by the students. At one point, nearly 300 students blockaded the administrative offices and boycotted classes. On May 18, the Trustees met again to reconsider the decision, leading finally to a reversal of the vote.

==== Other colleges ====
Sarah Lawrence College declined an offer to merge with Princeton University, becoming coeducational in 1969. Connecticut College also adopted coeducation during the late 1960s. Wells College, previously with a student body of women only, became co-educational in 2005. Douglass College, part of Rutgers University, was the last publicly funded women's only college until 2007 when it became coed.

== Criticism ==
Some black and/or working class and poor women felt alienated by the main planks of the second-wave feminist movement, which largely advocated women's right to work outside the home and expansion of reproductive rights. Women of color and poor white women in the U.S. had been working outside of the home in blue-collar and service jobs for generations. Additionally, Angela Davis wrote that while Afro-American women and white women were subjected to multiple unwilled pregnancies and had to clandestinely abort, Afro-American women were also suffering from compulsory sterilization programs that were not widely included in dialogue about reproductive justice.

Beginning in the late 20th century, numerous feminist scholars such as Audre Lorde and Winona LaDuke critiqued the second wave in the United States as reducing feminist activity into a homogenized and whitewashed chronology of feminist history that ignores the voices and contributions of many women of color, working-class women, and LGBT women.

The second-wave feminist movement in the United States has been criticized for failing to acknowledge the struggles of women of color, and their voices were often silenced or ignored by white feminists. It has been suggested that the dominant historical narratives of the feminist movement focuses on white, East Coast, and predominantly middle-class women and women's consciousness-raising groups, excluding the experiences and contributions of lesbians, women of color, and working-class and lower-class women. Chela Sandoval called the dominant narratives of the women's liberation movement "hegemonic feminism" because it essentializes the feminist historiography to an exclusive population of women, which assumes that all women experience the same oppressions as the white, East Coast, and predominantly middle-class women. Multiracial feminist theory also confronts the second-wave feminist movement's focus on white middle-class women by arguing that it neglected the interplay between racism and misogyny. This restricting view purportedly ignored the oppressions women face determined by their race, class, and sexuality, and gave rise to women-of-color feminisms that separated from the women's liberation movement, such as Black feminism, Africana womanism, and the Hijas de Cuauhtémoc that emerged at California State University, Long Beach, which was founded by Anna Nieto-Gómez, due to the Chicano Movement's sexism. Kimberlé Crenshaw coined the term "intersectionality" in 1989 in response to the white, middle-class views that dominated second-wave feminism. Intersectionality describes the way systems of oppression (i.e. sexism, racism) have multiplicative, not additive, effects, on those who are multiply marginalized. It has become a core tenet of third-wave feminism.

Many feminist scholars see the generational division of the second wave as problematic. Second wavers are typically essentialized as the Baby Boomer generation, when in actuality many feminist leaders of the second wave were born before World War II ended. This generational essentialism homogenizes the group that belongs to the wave and asserts that every person part of a certain demographic generation shared the same ideologies, because ideological differences were considered to be generational differences.

Feminist scholars, particularly those from the late 20th and early 21st centuries to the present day, have revisited diverse writings, oral histories, artwork, and artifacts of women of color, working-class women, and lesbians during the early 1960s to the early 1980s to decenter what they view as the dominant historical narratives of the second wave of the women's liberation movement, allowing the scope of the historical understanding of feminist consciousness to expand and transform. By recovering histories that they believe have been erased and overlooked, these scholars purport to establish what Maylei Blackwell termed "retrofitted memory". Blackwell describes this as a form of "countermemory" that creates a transformative and fluid "alternative archive" and space for women's feminist consciousness within "hegemonic narratives". For Blackwell, looking within the gaps and crevices of the second wave allows fragments of historical knowledge and memory to be discovered, and new historical feminist subjects as well as new perspectives about the past to emerge, forcing existing dominant histories that claim to represent a universal experience to be decentered and refocused.

== See also ==
- American philosophy
- Black Feminism
- Civil rights movements
- Counterculture of the 1960s
- Feminism in 1950s Britain
- Feminism and racism
- Feminist movements and ideologies
- Femmes solidaires
- First-wave feminism
- Golden Age of Porn
- Goddess movement
- History of feminism
- List of feminists
- List of women's rights activists
- Pro-life feminism
- Radical Feminism
- Sexual revolution
- Third-wave feminism
- Timeline of reproductive rights legislation
- Timeline of second-wave feminism
- Timeline of women's legal rights (other than voting)
- Timeline of women's suffrage
