= Rome Rule =

"Rome Rule" was a term used by Irish unionists to describe their belief that with the passage of a Home Rule Bill, the Roman Catholic Church would gain political power over their interests in Ireland. The slogan was popularised by the Radical MP and Quaker John Bright during the first Home Rule crisis in the late 19th century and continued to be used in the early 20th century.

== Background ==
The term has been documented as used in the House of Commons as early as 12 July 1871. The Local and Personal Act bill had been proposed by Denis Caulfield Heron, MP for County Tipperary. The Nationalist MP for County Westmeath, Patrick James Smyth, rose to second the Bill and used his speech to advocate repeal of the Union. In reply John Vance, the Unionist MP for Dublin City, stated: "The constituents of the honourable member for Westmeath would not be satisfied with the homoeopathic dose of 'home rule' embodied in the present bill" and his own opinion was that "home rule" in Ireland would prove to be "Rome rule".

Anti-Catholicism was prevalent amongst some of the Irish Protestant population:

Most Irish Protestants were deeply afraid of a repetition of the events of 1798 and the years just before. They tended to consider Roman Catholicism and possible rebellion as almost identical terms. To keep things as they were in Church and State seemed the guarantee of safety.

Ensuing out of the anti-Catholic landowner slogan "To Hell or Connaught" after the Battle of the Diamond in 1795, the "No Popery" slogan prior to Catholic Emancipation becoming law in 1829 – an event the Protestant Orangemen had long dreaded – their sentiments continued to be aroused by such writings as in the Rev. Thomas Drew's pamphlet, reading:

I learn by the doctrines, history and practices of the Church of Rome that the lives of Protestants are endangered, the laws of England set at nought, and the crown of England subordinated to the dictates of an Italian bishop.

== The 1886 Home Rule Bill ==
After the collapse of the 1798 United Irish rebellion and the passing of the Act of Union in 1801, the Orange Order was stronger than ever before, but began to decline and fell into disrepute towards the middle of the century. Despite this, Daniel O'Connell had trouble arranging rallies in Ulster for his Repeal Association, which sought repeal of the Act of Union. Having successfully arranged supportive "monster meetings" in the rest of Ireland, his visit to Belfast in 1841 was marked by stonings, hostile and supportive crowds, and threats of riots. Long before the 1885 Bill it was already clear that a significant number of Irish people wanted to maintain the Union, particularly those resident in Ulster who were not Roman Catholics.

Anglicans of the established Church of Ireland and the other Protestant groups such as Presbyterians had had different legal rights and priorities, and mutual disagreements, until the disestablishment of the Church of Ireland by the Irish Church Act 1869. While the Act was passed to reflect the small percentage of Church of Ireland members in the Irish population, and to increase the self-esteem of Irish Roman Catholics, the resulting level playing field allowed the different Protestant groups to act as political equals for the first time.

From 1882 Charles Stewart Parnell turned his attention from Irish land reform to pursuing Home Rule. As his National League grew, so did the Irish Protestants' fear of Home Rule. When Gladstone made known his conversion to Home Rule in 1885 and introduced the First Home Rule Bill, the Orange Order experienced a dramatic revival, became highly respectable, and a very powerful political organisation working for the maintenance of the Union. Ironically some leaders of the Irish Nationalist movement such as Isaac Butt and Charles Stewart Parnell were not Roman Catholics, but the majority of their supporters were.

While southern Ireland was clamouring for repeal of the Union with Britain, Ulster came round to the view that Union with Britain suited her better than any form of self-government for Ireland. For one thing, she saw that the Union was to her economic advantage since she was far more industrialised than the agricultural south, and her future clearly depended on the continuance of friendly trade with Britain. Due to the industrial revolution, Belfast had grown bigger than Dublin. Ulstermen were proud of their achievements and would have seen them as proof of the Weberian theory of the "Protestant work ethic".

Religious faith combined with business acumen to raise in Ulster a fixed opposition to Home Rule, which was later expressed in the popular slogan, Home Rule means Rome Rule. The Ulster unionist subjective sense of separate identity, articulated in religious idiom, dominated Ulster unionist hostility to home rule. That home rule meant Rome Rule was, for the average Ulster Protestant, conclusive condemnation of any tampering with the union. Rome Rule conjured the nightmare of a native rising for a settler community. Economic factors merely reinforced racial pride.

Her Protestant majority became fearful of one day finding herself dominated by a Roman Catholic Parliament in Dublin:

- They saw Catholic priests playing a big role in the pro-Home Rule IPP branches.
- Would Home Rule, they wondered, become Rome Rule, with Catholic bishops telling Catholic MPs how to vote?
- Might Irish Protestants not thereby lose their civil and religious liberty?

This was the background against which the English Conservative Party played the "Orange Card." Lord Randolph Churchill played it with gusto. In 1886, the year of Gladstone's first Home Rule Bill, Churchill crossed to Belfast to make an inflammatory anti-Home Rule speech in the Ulster Hall, and a little later, coined the memorable phrase, "Ulster will fight, and Ulster will be right".

Parnell's political opponents pointed out that he was the only non-Catholic MP in his party. To avoid further accusations about Rome Rule, he nominated six other non-Catholics for safe seats (out of the IPP's new total of 85 MPs) in the 1886 election.

=== Other elements ===
As the Irish nationalist movement recovered in the 1890s from the division caused by Parnell's relationship with Mrs O'Shea, it embraced Gaelic games and a growing Irish language revival movement, which were often encouraged by the Catholic Church for the good of its parishioners, but which also alienated Irish Protestants. The fate of Bridget Cleary in 1895 suggested that many rural Irish Catholics were still unduly superstitious. An "Irish-Ireland" ideology of nationalism was developed by David Moran, who stated in 1905 that it was essential to be Catholic to be Irish.

The resurgent Church's dogma on the Syllabus of Errors (1864) and Papal infallibility (1871) were unattractive. For observant Protestants, the encyclical "Apostolicae Curae" in 1896 had simply denied the validity of the Anglican hierarchy. In 1907 Modernism was proscribed in Pascendi dominici gregis and Lamentabili sane, indicating that no Protestant, being a heretic, could ever be well regarded by a Catholic-led government.

Opponents of Home Rule could also quote from several anti-clerical books by Margaret Cusack, the founder of The Sisters of St. Joseph of Peace, who had then converted to Protestantism in 1887. In The Nun of Kenmare: An Autobiography (1889), Cusack complained that she had been vilified by her fellow churchmen behind her back: "The practice of the Inquisition still holds in the Roman church, as I have found again and again, and as this book will show. You are condemned unheard."

The Ne Temere papal decree of 1907 required non-Catholics married to a Catholic to agree to educate their children as Catholics, and often the non-Catholic was required to convert before the marriage. Ne Temere was tolerated by the UK parliament as it had little impact in Britain; Irish Protestants felt that it would have a much greater impact in a future Catholic-dominated Home Rule Ireland. In 1911 debates, both views were considered, and notably, those against Ne Temere were unionists and those tolerating it were not.

From 1898 the "Index", or list of books forbidden to Catholics, was modified by Pope Leo XIII. Along with indecent works it still included forbidden authors such as Jonathan Swift and Daniel Defoe, and the scientists John Locke and Galileo, that most Europeans would by then have found unobjectionable.

== Socialist theorists on Rome Rule ==
The English socialist organiser Harry Quelch wrote in his 1902 essay, "Home Rule and Rome Rule":

It is not too much to say that from the time that a Pope of Rome formally sold Ireland to an English King, the Church of Rome has been the persistent, unrelenting enemy of Ireland and the Irish people.

A Roman Catholic writer, Mr. Michael J. F. McCarthy, in a book on "Priests and People in Ireland", makes a vigorous and uncompromising attack on the Roman Catholic hierarchy in Ireland. He ascribes the ills of Ireland mainly to a single cause, that is sacerdotalism. In his opinion it is the priesthood which is keeping Celtic Ireland "poor, miserable, depressed, unprogressive". Mr. Frank Hugh O'Donnell, himself a Roman Catholic and an Irish Nationalist, declares that notwithstanding the appalling poverty of masses of the Irish people, large sums are obtained by the Roman Catholic hierarchy in Ireland. He says that: "All over Ireland urgent wants of the lay Catholic community are left unattended. All over Ireland, not even wants, but mere caprices of the clergy are the excuse for costly outlay. All over Ireland, and outside Ireland, the sight of collecting priests on all sorts of mendicant missions is an abiding vision. Sometimes it is to construct a sumptuous cathedral in a hamlet of grog-shops and hovels. Sometimes it is to raise a memorial church of marble at a cost of £80,000 on an uninhabited hillside in Kerry out of respect to the birthplace of Daniel O’Connell. Sometimes it is to defray the mistake of an architect. Sometimes it is to defray the bill of a Jew purveyor of decorative monstrosities. Never is it to endow the most crying needs of a Catholic university."

We hear from time to time that the Irish people are determined to formulate their own politics, and not to take them from Rome; but events constantly demonstrate that not only the religion but the politics of Ireland are those of the Church of Rome, and that the Irish people are still being exploited in the interest of clericalism and for the proselytising of England. The question is: How long will the people of Ireland permit themselves to be used in this way, and to constitute one of the most effectual barriers to Irish independence by the suspicion that Home Rule only means Rome Rule?

The Irish socialist and nationalist James Connolly wrote much about religion and politics, but did not consider the insecurities of Irish loyalists. His optimistic view in 1910 was that the Catholic Church would accommodate itself with an Irish "Workers' Republic", and so Rome Rule could never occur:

North and the South will again clasp hands, again will it be demonstrated, as in ’98, that the pressure of a common exploitation can make enthusiastic rebels out of a Protestant working class, earnest champions of civil and religious liberty out of Catholics, and out of both a united Social democracy.

== 1912–1925 ==
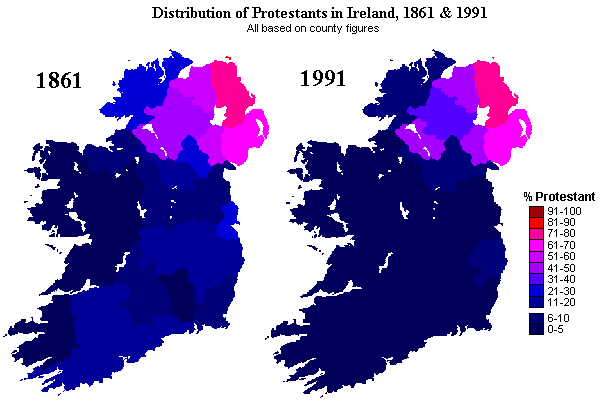
Concentration of Protestants in Ireland per county.

The phrase took on a new lease of life from the introduction of the Third Home Rule Bill in April 1912. Ulster loyalist opponents of Home Rule formed the Ulster Volunteers and their opponents in the rest of Ireland set up the Irish Volunteers in 1913. Both paramilitary groups imported arms, and by mid-1914 it seemed likely that an Irish civil war would erupt, with people's allegiances based largely, if not primarily, on their parents' religions.

The Protestants' fears about a Dublin Parliament may seem to have been exaggerated at the time, but the history of Ireland since independence has, on the whole, tended to suggest that they were not. "Home Rule", they declared, "would be Rome Rule, and that was all there was to it". "It may seem strange to you and me," Bonar Law told Lord Riddell, "but it is a religious question. Those people are . . . . prepared to die for their convictions".

Indeed, occasional speeches by leading Nationalists designed to allay Liberal fears that "Home Rule really would be Rome Rule", were in 1911 on the other hand making some Catholic churchmen anxious. Welcome as the reward of Home Rule would be, the question arose: Are they not more likely, to have as their reward secularism in the schools?

The nationalist view was also indicatively divergent:

Our home was a Catholic household; all the children were at Catholic schools and the Catholic university, so all the children’s friends were Catholics, and all my grandmother’s subtle match-making and her ambition’s pre-supposed Catholic dynasties. Home Rule means Rome Rule said the Ulster Protestant slogan. Not at all. ...It was "our people", neither Rome nor the Protestant ascendancy, who should rule in Ireland. "Our people", through an élite, sprung from it, trained for its service, ...The Jesuits were helping to train such an élite.

The envisaged threat from both Home Rule and Rome was expressed in an angry poem by Rudyard Kipling, Ulster 1912, 4th verse:

’We know the war prepared
On every peaceful home,
We know the hells declared
For such as serve not Rome.

It so happened that Pius X was Pope in 1903–1914, the period when the policies of Ulster unionism were cast. His general policy of church supremacy led to antagonism across Europe between secular governments and his Church. Unlike other Catholic churches in Europe, such as in Spain or Portugal, the Irish Church was no longer semi-autonomous but had been assigned in 1833 to the Congregation of Missions in Rome. As a result, the Irish Church could be governed under canon law by the relatively informal motu proprio system. Concern about this led to proposals for safeguards in the debates that led to the Home Rule Act 1914.

Loyalists were unspecific about the likely effect of "Rome Rule", but it became an effective slogan in maintaining the loyalty of the Protestant working class, and contributed to the lack of trust which caused the near-civil war prior to the Government of Ireland Act 1914 and the Partition of Ireland during 1914–25. From the Easter Rising in 1916 on, a number of prominent Nationalist Protestants or lapsed Catholics even felt the need to conform to be considered fully involved in the nationalist movement.

During the Irish War of Independence the Irish Republic sought international recognition from other countries, including the Holy See. Its envoy Seán T. O'Kelly wrote to Pope Benedict XV in 1920 in terms suggesting that the war was a part of a long religious struggle, and identifying the Irish Republic with "Catholic Ireland". The letter was not published until recently; it included:

Irish Catholics believe that their devotion to their religion and to the Holy See handicaps their efforts for independence. While this in no way shakes their adherence to the Faith, they naturally resent the audacity of an officially heretical government approaching the Holy See on occasions through Catholic or non-Catholic channels, seeking to procure, on pretexts of faith and morals, the condemnation of Catholic Ireland. It is true that the latter happens to be weak and England strong; hence England tries to turn into an instrument of further oppression a force on which Ireland should obviously have paramount claims and for which Ireland suffered and fought and bled while the oppressor repudiated, blasphemed and persecuted it.

After 1922 Northern Ireland on the other hand was clear about where it stood, boasting itself to be A Protestant parliament for a Protestant people. The term Rome Rule was occasionally used as a disparaging term by anti-clerical socialists in Ireland who opposed the Church's views on social policy. In a campaign against Ireland's laws forbidding contraception, the Irish feminist Mary Kenny stated in 1971 that – "Ian Paisley was right; Home Rule is Rome Rule".

In 2009 Professor Ronan Fanning of UCD considered that: "...in an overwhelmingly Catholic Ireland, the old Unionist taunt that Home Rule would mean Rome Rule had no force because Rome Rule had become more a cause for pride than for shame."

== See also ==
- Catholic Church in Ireland

== Sources ==
- Harry Quelch in 1902
- Hocking 1912 ref.
