= Pat West =

Pat West may refer to:

- Pat West (American football), American football fullback
- Pat West (actor), American character actor

== See also ==
- Patrick West, British freelance writer and political commentator
