= June Levine =

Irish journalist, novelist and feminist

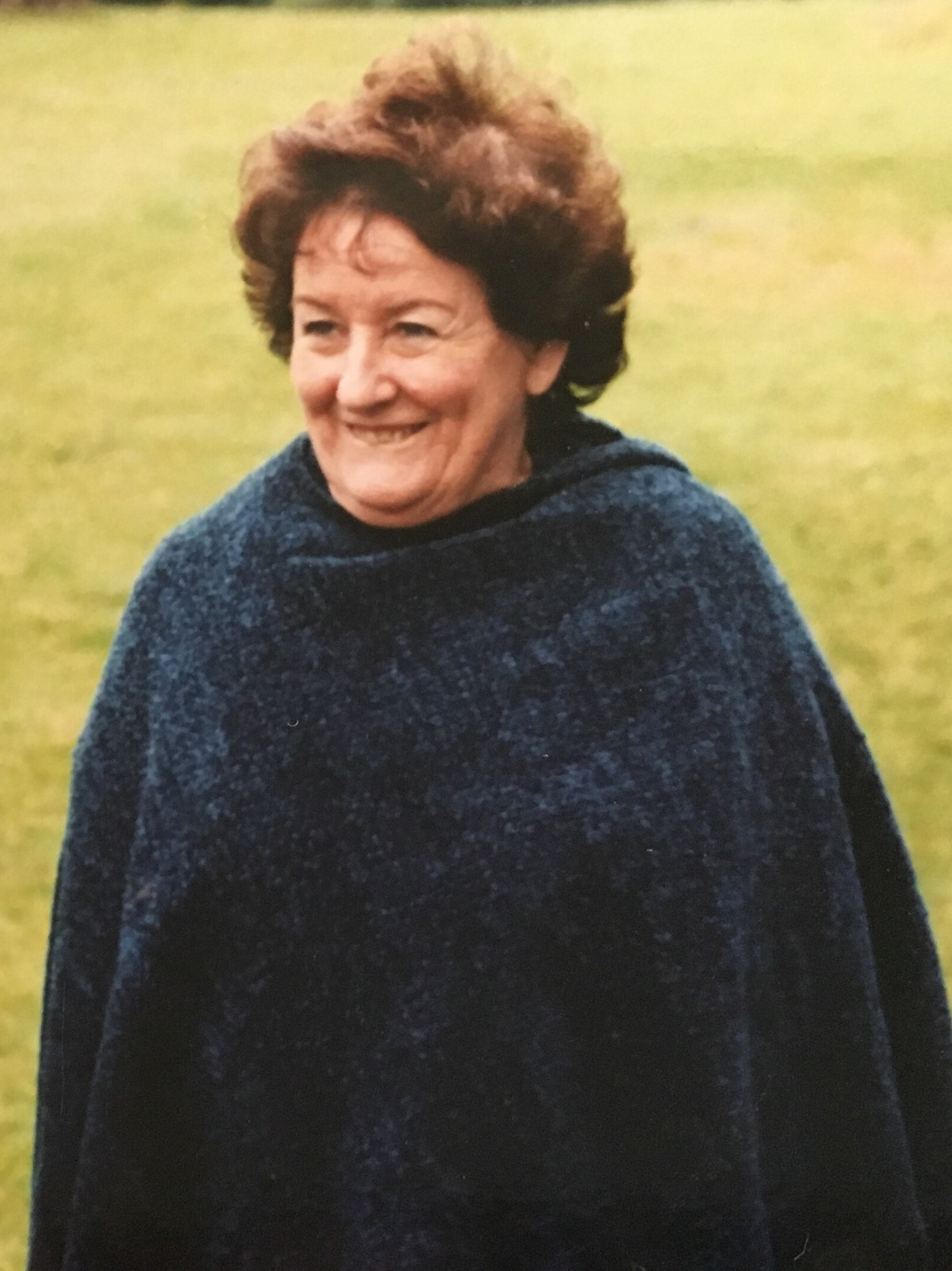
June Levine in 1994

June Levine (31 December 1931 – 14 October 2008) was an Irish journalist, novelist and feminist, who played a central part in the Irish women's movement.

== Early life and family ==
Levine was born into a Jewish-Catholic family. Her parents Charles Solomon Levine, the son of Jewish parents who fled from Latvia and Muriel Ruth McMahon from Co Clare secretly got married at a Catholic church in Marlborough Street, Dublin at a young age. June, the eldest of five children, was baptised a Catholic and attended a Jewish school in Dublin. In 1947, the family decided to convert to Judaism.

At the age of 15, Levine began her career in journalism for The Irish Times as a teenager instead of pursuing further education. She met and married Canadian Jewish medical student, Kenneth Mesbur. In the 1950s, the married couple and their two children emigrated to Ontario, Canada, where they settled, and a third baby was born. The marriage ended and Levine returned to Dublin with her three children. In 1999, June Levine married her partner of thirty years, psychiatrist Professor Ivor Browne.

== Career ==
In 1965, Levine returned to her career in journalism and was elected assistant editor of the Irish Woman’s Journal. She wrote two best selling books, Sisters, a personal history of the feminist movement, and, with Lyn Madden, Lyn: A Story of Prostitution.

She was also involved with the Irish women's movement, alongside figures such as Mary Kenny, Margaret Gaj and Mary Maher. In 1971 she travelled with other feminists, including Mary Kenny and Nell McCafferty, on the so-called "Contraceptive Train" when they travelled to Belfast to buy condoms.

== Later life ==
In Levine’s later life, she became interested in India's women's movement. She only wrote one work of fiction, A Season of Weddings, which was published in 1992 and told the tale of a Dublin woman who went to New Delhi for a Jewish wedding.

Levine had a number of strokes in her last year, which impacted her speech. Having regained some ability to communicate, she experienced a second stroke in the first week of October, lost consciousness, and died on 14 October 2008 in Tallaght Hospital. In 2009 Attic Press reissued her book Sisters with a preface written by Levine's friend Nell McCafferty.
