= Máirín Johnston =

Máirín Johnston (born 1931) is an Irish author and feminist from The Liberties in Dublin, Ireland who worked to bring contraceptives into Dublin in 1971 with the Irish Women's Liberation Movement (IWLM). Johnston has authored Dublin Belles: Conversations with Dublin Women and Around the Banks of Pimlico, as well as the children's book The Pony Express, which won a Bisto Merit Award in 1994.

== Work with Irish Women's Liberation Movement ==
Johnston worked as a core member of the Irish Women's Liberation Movement, a group of feminists working out of Dublin. They advocated for sexual and reproductive health and rights to contraceptives throughout Ireland. On 6 March 1971, on behalf of the Irish Women's Liberation Movement, Johnston appeared on a Late Late Show panel with another founding group member, Nell McCafferty. According to Rosita Sweetman, a member of the group, "Everything was going swimmingly until, of course, hot head Mary Kenny, yes, that Mary Kenny, lobbed a hand grenade into the mix by proclaiming no Irish politician – at that stage nearly all Irish politicians were male – would bring in legislation that disturbed the glorious benefits of the patriarchy," and "all hell broke loose." The IWLM manifesto Chains or Change that had been introduced on the show sold out soon afterwards.

In May 1971, the Irish Women's Liberation Movement sent a group of Irish women by way of 'the Contraceptive Train' to Belfast to buy contraceptives. At the time, contraception was illegal in the Republic of Ireland but was available in Belfast. On 22 May 1971, Johnston and a group of more than 40 women, as well as her partner, son and daughter, travelled to Belfast by train to purchase contraceptives. A Japanese television crew followed them to purchase the contraceptives, and the women proceeded back through customs without losing any of the items they obtained in Belfast.

A mural to honour Johnston was made by the artist Fink (artist) on the shop front of Norton's Greengrocer.
