= Mary Maher (journalist) =

Irish journalist, feminist and trade unionist (1940–2021)

- Born: 9 November 1940; Chicago, Illinois, U.S.
- Died: 30 November 2021 (aged 81); Dublin, Ireland
- Occupations: Trade unionist, feminist, journalist
- Known for: feminist activism

Mary Maher (9 November 1940 – 30 November 2021) was an American-born Irish trade unionist, feminist, and journalist. She was a founder of the Irish Women's Liberation Movement and the first women's editor at The Irish Times newspaper, where she worked for 36 years.

== Early life ==
Maher was born in Chicago to Irish American parents, whose ancestors hailed mainly from County Tipperary. She had four siblings, James, Jerome, William and Bonnie. Maher grew up in Rogers Park, attending the local Sacred Heart School. Maher went on to get her diploma from Barat College in Lake Forest, Illinois.

== Career ==
Maher became a reporter for the Chicago Tribune on the society desk. Unfulfilled, she relocated to Ireland where she became a journalist working for The Irish Times in 1965, an employer she remained with for 36 years.

Conscious of the changes and obstacles in Irish society at the time, Maher's pages covered topics such as corporal punishment, equal pay and housing slums. She was a founding member of the Irish Women's Liberation Movement.

Maher was one of a group of feminist Irish journalists including Maeve Donnellan, Nell McCafferty, Geraldine Kennedy, Gabrielle Williams, Renagh Holohan, Christina Murphy, Mary Cummins, and Caroline Walsh. They wrote about sexuality and social upheaval during the seventies in Ireland. Maher described it as the era when "Irish women were invented". She made history by becoming the first female staff member to return to work in the Irish Times after marriage as well as negotiating paid maternity leave, another first.

== Later life ==
Maher married Des Geraghty in 1969 and the couple had two daughters, Maeve (born 9 May 1970) and Nóra (born 17 May 1971). They later separated, but remained good friends for life and frequently worked together on cultural and trade-union projects.

Maher was the first "mother of the chapel" ("chapel" refers to an in-house union branch within a newspaper) in the National Union of Journalists at The Irish Times. Her connection with the union meant she was frequently the delegate to the Dublin Council of Trade Unions and attended the NUJ conferences. Maher was a lifelong union activist and held several senior positions within the union.

Maher retired as assistant chief subeditor in 2001. A long illness saw her cared for in a nursing home in Bray, County Wicklow. She died in hospital in Dublin in November 2021.

== Family history ==
During her time as a reporter Maher discovered a family secret, that one of her ancestors had possibly been one of the murderers of Patrick Henry Cronin. She wrote a semi-fictional novel about the murders called The Devil's Card.

== Publications ==
- Maher, Mary (1992). The Devil's Card. Brandon. ISBN 978-0-86322-130-9.
- O'Brien, Kate Cruise; Maher, Mary (1997). If Only. Poolbeg. ISBN 978-1-85371-751-2.

== See also ==
- Americans in Ireland
