= Richard West (journalist) =

British journalist and author

Richard West (18 July 1930 – 25 April 2015) was a British journalist and author best known for his reporting of the Vietnam War and Yugoslavia. He is described by Damian Thompson as "one of the finest foreign correspondents of the 20th century", with a career that covered the span of the Cold War in most of its theatres.

== Life and career ==
Born in London, West attended Marlborough College before his national service spell in Trieste awakened a lifelong interest in Yugoslavia.

Starting off his journalistic career at the Manchester Guardian, West became a foreign correspondent in Yugoslavia, Africa, Central America and Indochina. Described by Neal Ascherson as the "paragon of the independent journalist for his generation", he would spend much of the next two decades in Vietnam, Africa and eastern Europe, where he was codenamned Agent Friday by Communist Poland's secret police. Among his books are The Making of the Prime Minister (with Anthony Howard), An English Journey (1981) and Tito and the Rise and Fall of Yugoslavia (1995). Along with Patrick Marnham and Auberon Waugh, West was one of three signatories to a letter to The Times that called for a British monument to honour those forcibly repatriated as a result of the Yalta Conference; it was eventually erected in 1986 as Twelve Responses to Tragedy.

== Personal life and death ==
He was the grandson of the classics scholar Walter Leaf and the great-grandson of poet John Addington Symonds, and was married to the Irish journalist Mary Kenny. His sons are journalists Patrick West and Ed West. Richard West was a first cousin of the actor Timothy West.

West died in Deal, Kent, where he had lived since 1998, on 25 April 2015, aged 84.

== Bibliography ==
=== Books ===
- P.R. the Fifth Estate (1963)
- The Making of the Prime Minister (1965) (with Anthony Howard)
- The White Tribes of Africa (1965)
- The Gringo in Latin America (1967)
- Sketches from Vietnam (1968)
- Back to Africa (1970)
- Brazza of the Congo (1972)
- River of Tears (1972)
- Victory in Vietnam (1974)
- The White Tribes Revisited (1978)
- An English Journey (1981)
- The Diamonds and the Necklace: A South African Journey (1989)
- Hurricane in Nicaragua (1989)
- Thailand: The Last Domino (1991)
- Tito and the Rise and Fall of Yugoslavia (1994)
- War and Peace in Vietnam (1995)
- The Life and Strange Surprising Adventures of Daniel Defoe (1998)
- Chaucer: The Life and Times of the First English Poet (2002)
