= Irish Women's Liberation Movement =

Irish feminist movement in the 1970s

The Irish Women's Liberation Movement (IWLM) was an alliance of a group of Irish women who were concerned about the sexism within Ireland both socially and legally. They first began after a meeting in Dublin's Bewley's Cafe on Grafton Street in 1970. The group was short-lived, but influential.

== Background ==
In the 1970s in the Republic of Ireland, women were denied certain rights based on their gender. Marital rape was not a crime. Women could not keep their jobs for public service or for banks if they got married, collect children's allowance, nor choose their own official place of domicile, and they were normally not paid the same wages for the same work as men. Women could also not buy contraceptives. Divorce was illegal and "single mothers, widows and deserted wives faced dire poverty." Women were not required to serve on juries and instead had to opt into jury service, meaning that in practice very few women served on juries.

There were other women-focused groups in Ireland at the time, such as the Irish Housewives' Association and the Irish Countrywomen's Association which worked for change in a more patient, "behind the scenes" way. The members of the IWLM did not seek change through patience, but rather as "activists and lobbyists."

== History ==
The Irish Women's Liberation Movement held their meetings in Gaj's restaurant on Baggot Street every Monday. Gaj's restaurant was owned by Margaret Gaj who was a feminist socialist activist. It was initially started with twelve women, most of whom were journalists. One of the co-founders was June Levine.

The IWLM was democratically organised, with members voting on various projects and protests as a group each month. Local groups of IWLM sent two representatives each to the meetings. Overall, the meetings were often very disorganised and noisy, but also, the meetings allowed women to express ideas they'd not been able to give voice to before.

=== Manifesto ===
In 1970 they published their manifesto called Chains or Change, which sold out immediately.

The Chains or Change manifesto had six aims and they were:

- Equal rights in law.
- Equal pay and the removal of the marriage bar.
- Justice for widows, single mothers and deserted wives.
- Equal educational opportunities.
- The right to contraception.
- One family, one house.

The issue of abortion was still too volatile for IWLM to discuss, even among their members, so it was never part of the manifesto.

=== The Late Late Show ===
Members Nell McCafferty and Máirín Johnston represented the IWLM on The Late Late Show for a lively debate soon after it was published. The later Taoiseach of Ireland, Garret FitzGerald, left his home while watching The Late Late Show and went on air to discuss the issues, but the discussion turned into a "free-for-all screaming match between Garret Fitzgerald and various women in the audience." He had been provoked into coming on the show because Mary Kenny made a statement on the show accusing Dáil members of not caring about women's problems. Fitzgerald said that the issue was not the fault of the government, but of women for not asking for change. Because some of the IWLM members had "spent years putting pressure on various governing bodies, the exchange turned into a good fight."

=== Organisation ===
One month after The Late Late Show debate, the first public meeting of the IWLM was held in the Dublin's Mansion House. Over 1,000 women attended the meeting which lasted over three hours (men were allowed in as "guests"). Following this meeting names of those interested in joining were taken; a number of groups and sub-committees were formed.

=== Contraceptive Train ===
On 22 May 1971 forty-seven members of the Irish Women's Liberation Movement took the Dublin to Belfast train to import contraceptives over the Irish border and this became known as the Contraceptive Train. One member, Pat Ledwith, thought the condoms would be confiscated, but they weren't. The Contraceptive Train was considered a "daring act" by the Irish Independent because the women involved risked stigma from their conservative community.

=== Name change ===
In 1972, the IWLM changed its name to the Women's Liberation Movement. Several other groups were formed by members of the IWLM such as Irishwomen United, Women's Political Association, Irish Women's Aid, The Rape Crisis Centre and The National Women's Council of Ireland.

=== Important members ===
Other famous members of the Irish Women's Liberation Movement were Nell McCafferty and Mary Kenny Mary Maher, who was from Chicago, contributed ideas from the American feminist movement to the group. Nuala Fennell was involved, but resigned in 1971 due to differences over the Prohibition of Forcible Entry Bill. This piece of legislation was an area of contention among other groups in Ireland at the time as well because of one of the clauses which could lead to fewer civil rights for journalists. In addition, clauses in the bill prohibited the occupation of vacant houses.

== See also ==
- Abortion in the Republic of Ireland
- Feminism in the Republic of Ireland
- Women's liberation movement
- Women's rights
