= Mary Kenny =

Irish journalist, broadcaster and playwright

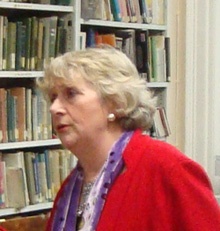
Kenny in 2008

Mary Kenny (born 4 April 1944) is an Irish journalist, broadcaster and playwright. A founding member of the Irish Women's Liberation Movement, she was one of the country's first and foremost feminists, often contributes columns to the Irish Independent and has been described as "the grand dame of Irish journalism". She is based in England.

== Early life ==
Mary Kenny was born in Dublin, Ireland. Her father was born in 1877. She grew up in Sandymount, and was expelled from convent school at age 16. She had a sister, Ursula.

== Career ==
She began working at the London Evening Standard in 1966 on its "Londoner's Diary" column, later as a general feature writer, and was woman's editor of The Irish Press in the early 1970s.

=== Irish Women's Liberation Movement ===
Kenny was one of the founding members of the Irish Women's Liberation Movement. Although the group had no formal structure of officials, she was often seen as the "ring leader" of the group. In March 1971, as part of an action by the IWLM, she walked out of Haddington Road church after the Archbishop of Dublin's pastoral was read out from the pulpit, confirming that "any contraceptive act is always wrong", saying "this is Church dictatorship". In a follow-up letter to The Irish Times she explained her actions by saying Ian Paisley was right: "Home Rule is Rome Rule".

In 1971, Kenny travelled with Nell McCafferty, June Levine and other Irish feminists on the so-called "Contraceptive Train" from Dublin to Belfast to buy condoms, then illegal within the Republic of Ireland. Later that year she returned to London as Features Editor of the Evening Standard.

=== "Ugandan discussions" ===
In 1973, Kenny was allegedly "disturbed in the arms of a former cabinet minister of President Obote of Uganda during a party", in her words 'snogging an intelligent African judge' (who had one leg, something she did not notice at the time; he was later murdered by Idi Amin), which led poet James Fenton to coin the euphemism "Ugandan discussions" to mean sexual intercourse. The phrase was first used by the magazine Private Eye on 9 March 1973, but has been widely used since then and was included by the BBC in a list of "The 10 most scandalous euphemisms" in 2013.

== Works ==
Kenny has written for numerous broadsheet publications in Ireland and Britain, including the Irish Press, Irish Independent, The Times, The Guardian, The Irish Catholic, The Daily Telegraph and The Spectator. She has written books on feminism, Catholicism in Ireland and a biography of William Joyce.

Roy Foster described Crown and Shamrock: Love and Hate between Ireland and the British Monarchy (2009) as "characteristically breezy, racy and insightful". She wrote the play Allegiance, in which Mel Smith played Winston Churchill and Michael Fassbender played Michael Collins in a performance on the 2006 Edinburgh Festival Fringe.

== Ireland and the Commonwealth of Nations ==
Kenny, along with Éamon Ó Cuív and Frank Feighan, is an advocate of the Republic of Ireland returning to its membership of the Commonwealth of Nations.

== Personal life ==
Kenny married journalist and writer Richard West in 1974 and the couple raised two children: Patrick and Ed West, both journalists. Richard died in 2015.

== Bibliography ==
=== Non-fiction ===
- Women X Two: How to Cope with a Double Life (1978)
- Why Christianity Works (1981)
- Making the Family Matter: A New Vision of Expanded Family Living with Practical Ideas to Make it Work (co-authored with James Kenny) (1980)
- Goodbye to Catholic Ireland: A Social Person and Cultural History (1997)
- Death by Heroin; Recovery by Hope (1999)
- Germany Calling: A Personal Biography of William Joyce, Lord Haw-Haw. Dublin: New Island Books. ISBN 9781902602783.

=== Editor ===
- The Long Road Back: The Story of a Triumph Over Sudden and Total Disablement by Bill Ellis

=== Fiction ===
- A Mood for Love and Other Stories

== See also ==
- List of Irish dramatists
- Contraception in the Republic of Ireland
- Ireland and the Commonwealth of Nations
