= Ed West (journalist) =

British author, journalist and blogger

- Occupations: Author, journalist
- Relatives: Richard West (father); Mary Kenny (mother); Patrick West (brother)
- Writing career
- Subjects: Religion, social commentary
- Notable works: The Diversity Illusion; Tory Boy
- Website: edwest.co.uk

Ed West is a British author, journalist and blogger. He was previously the deputy editor of UnHerd, deputy editor of The Catholic Herald and a columnist for The Daily Telegraph and The Spectator. He began his career with the lads' mag Nuts Magazine, and has also written for the Evening Standard, The Guardian, The i, The Week, and Spiked.

He is the son of British journalist Richard West and Irish journalist Mary Kenny, and the brother of journalist Patrick West.

While working at men's magazines, West wrote a number of short humour books, including one called How to Pull Women (2006), which he later described on his blog for The Daily Telegraph as "embarrassing".

West's book, The Diversity Illusion, which argues that immigration has adverse effects on British society, was published in April 2013. Reviewing the book, Peter Oborne described West as "one of the most interesting of the rising generation of political writers, who delights in destroying liberal pieties". Oborne also said: "At its worst, though, West's book can come over as an anti-Islamic rant." The Observer described the book as a "brazen and breezily written polemic" whose "arguments are repeatedly undermined by reality." The Sunday Times included the book in their 2015 list of "Political Books of the Year".

West's 2020 book Small Men on the Wrong Side of History focuses on the failures of post-war conservatism. Newer editions of the book change the title to Tory Boy.

== Books ==
- The Little Book of Asbos (Crombie Jardine, 2005)
- Don't Mention the World Cup (Summersdale, 2006)
- Male Grooming (Summdersale, 2006)
- How to Pull Women: The Science of Seduction (Summersdale, 2006) ISBN 184024545X
- The Diversity Illusion (Gibson Square Books Ltd, 2013) ISBN 1908096055
- The Silence of Our Friends (2014)
- The Realm: The True history behind Game of Thrones
- 1215 and All That: Magna Carta and King John (Skyhorse Publishing, 2017) ISBN 9781510719873
- Saxons vs. Vikings: Alfred the Great and England in the Dark Ages (Skyhorse Publishing, 2017) ISBN 9781510719859
- 1066 and Before All That: The Battle of Hastings, Anglo-Saxon and Norman England (Skyhorse Publishing, 2017) ISBN 9781510719866
- England in the Age of Chivalry . . . And Awful Diseases: The Hundred Years' War and Black Death (Skyhorse Publishing, 2018) ISBN 9781510719880
- My Kingdom for a Horse: The War of the Roses (A Very, Very Short History of England) (Skyhorse Publishing, 2018) ISBN 9781510719897
- The Path of the Martyrs: Charles Martel, The Battle of Tours and the Birth of Europe (Sharpe Books, 2019) ISBN 9781795052146
- Iron, Fire, and Ice: The Real History that Inspired Game of Thrones (Skyhorse Publishing, 2019) ISBN 9781510735644
- Tory Boy: Memoirs of the Last Conservative (Little, Brown and Company, 2020) ISBN 9781472130808 Originally published as Small Men on the Wrong Side of History
