= Family Home Protection Act 1976 =

The Family Home Protection Act of 1976 is an Act of the Oireachtas which regulates an aspect of property law in Ireland and prevents the sale, partial sale, mortgage or re-mortgage of a property that is defined as a family home under the terms of the Act without the knowledge and consent of both spouses therein residing. A family home under the terms of the Act is a dwelling which is the ordinary residence of a married couple. The effect of the act is that, although the property may be in the registered ownership of one spouse only, this spouse cannot carry out transactions concerning the property – which could lead to the loss of the family home – without the other spouse's knowledge and consent.

The legislation was deemed necessary to deal with the large number of homes (especially farmhouses in rural Ireland) which, through inheritance or acquisition before marriage, were the legal property of one spouse only, to the potential detriment of (in most cases) the owner's wife. The Act provides protection for married couples only: common-law, cohabiting or same-sex couples are not protected under the Act. The Act, however, is only relevant in cases of single ownership. Couples of all categories would be best advised to ensure both partners are the legally registered owners of their home.

== Consent Requirement ==
Section 3 of the Act sets forth the requirement for consent:

(1) Where a spouse, without the prior consent in writing of the other spouse, purports to convey any interest in the family home to any person except the other spouse, then, subject to subsections (2) and (3) and section 4, the purported conveyance shall be void.

There are a number of issues here. First, the consent must be prior to the transaction. This requirement has been interpreted regularly. In Bank of Ireland v Hanrahan, it was held that a mortgage by deposit of title deeds was not created when the deeds were left overnight in the bank, but rather the next morning when the defendant consented to the creation of the mortgage.

In Bank of Ireland v Smyth, it was held that consent had to be voluntary and fully informed. Although Mrs. Smyth had signed a consent form for the purposes of s.3, she was not aware of the implications of that consent and therefore it was held not to be valid.

== See also ==
- Fraudulent conveyance
- Homestead
- Fee tail
