= Contraception in the Republic of Ireland =

Contraception was illegal in Ireland from 1935 until 1980, when it was legalised with strong restrictions, later loosened. The ban reflected Catholic teachings on sexual morality.

== History ==
=== 1920s ===
Ireland’s approach to birth control was dominated by Catholic moral teaching and legal bans for much of the century, with change coming only slowly through activism and court cases. After independence (1922), the new Irish Free State embraced a strict Catholic “moral order”; divorce was outlawed, and contraceptives were forbidden.

=== 1930s: Legal bans on contraception ===
==== Papal encyclicals ====
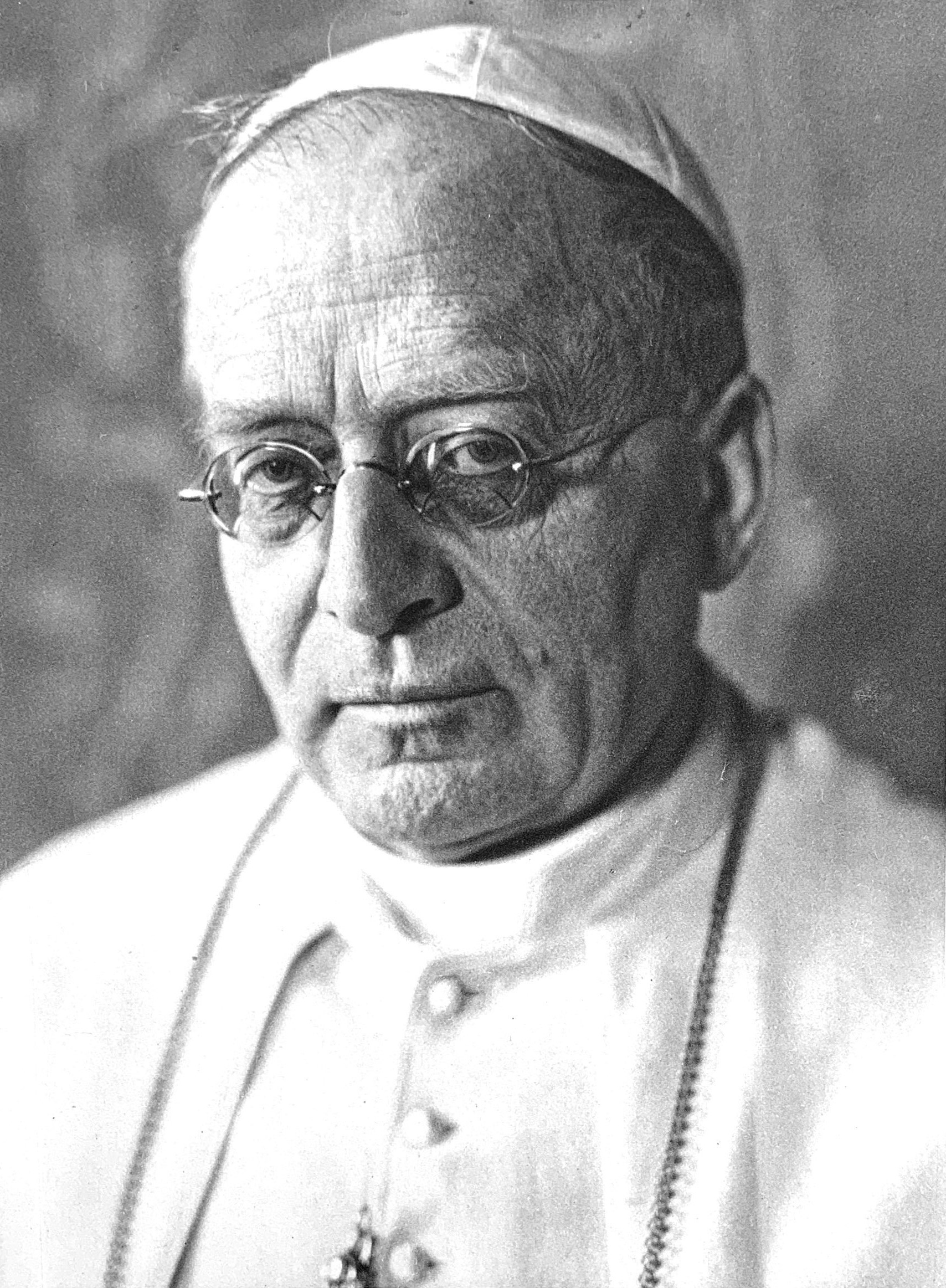
In 1930 Pope Pius XI issued Casti connubii, which explicitly forbid the use of contraceptives amongst Catholics

The encyclical Casti connubii (1930) followed the industrial production and widespread use of condoms that usually prevent fertilisation. It specified:

any use whatsoever of matrimony exercised in such a way that the act is deliberately frustrated in its natural power to generate life is an offence against the law of God and of nature, and those who indulge in such are branded with the guilt of a grave sin

— Casti connubii

==== 1935 Ban on sale of contraceptives ====
Owning and using contraceptive devices and pills was not prohibited under Irish law. However, from 1935, it was illegal to sell or to import them. During this time a loophole was used, where a device such as a condom could not be "offered for sale", but a citizen could be "invited to treat" to buy it. Also people made donations to family planning associations to obtain contraception as a "gift". However, the reality for almost all of the population was that contraception was unobtainable. Few outlets wanted to stock a product that could bring the attention of the police or public opprobrium. The 1929 Censorship of Publications Act was also used to ban information and literature on family planning, making birth control a taboo topic.

=== 1940s and 1950s: Status quo ===
Throughout the 1940s and 1950s there was virtually no liberalisation. The Catholic Church remained deeply influential in politics and society, and Irish public policy strongly enforced its sexual teaching. Discussion of contraception was discouraged or ignored in schools, newspapers and by doctors. Demographically, high fertility continued (Ireland’s birth rate in the 1950s was only slightly below the Western European average), reflecting both social norms and the lack of legal methods. In practice, many couples resorted to abstinence or the unreliable calendar-based contraceptive methods, but any use of modern methods remained secret and informal. In short, the ban on contraceptives stayed firmly in place, with Catholic lay groups (like the Knights of Saint Columbanus and the Irish Guild of Saint Luke) reinforcing Church teaching in public life

=== 1960s: The Pill reaches Ireland ===
In the 1960s, international developments began to influence Ireland’s approach to contraception. Most notably, the contraceptive pill had been developed in the 1950s and reached the Irish market by the mid-1960s, though it was initially prescribed as a "cycle regulator" for menstrual problems. Many married women were able to access the Pill by complaining of heavy or irregular periods, thus practising birth control under a medical pretext. Academic studies note that during the 1960s and 1970s, the Pill effectively became "the only contraceptive available legally" in Ireland, albeit accessed through "coded language" between patients and sympathetic doctors.

The marketing of "the pill" internationally prompted wider debate within the Catholic Church; A Pontifical Commission on Birth Control was established to advise on the issue, and it is often cited that a majority of the commission favoured some relaxation of the Church’s traditional ban. This division is reflected in the cautious wording of the later papal encyclical. However, in 1968, Pope Paul VI issued the encyclical Humanae vitae, which reaffirmed that artificial contraception was not morally permissible. In Ireland, the Catholic hierarchy responded by doubling down on their opposition, urging the government to retain the strict legal ban on contraception.

Meanwhile, the first modest attempts to expand access emerged. In 1969, the Irish Family Planning Association (IFPA) and similar clinics started to offer contraceptives by "donation" (not for sale) in order to skirt the law. These clinics operated mainly in Dublin and other urban, middle-class areas. Although still technically illegal, they showed that demand for birth control was growing. For most of the 1960s, the law forbade sale and import of contraceptives, but many couples quietly practised family planning via the pill or discreet imported condoms under a doctor's care.

=== 1970s: Demands for change ===
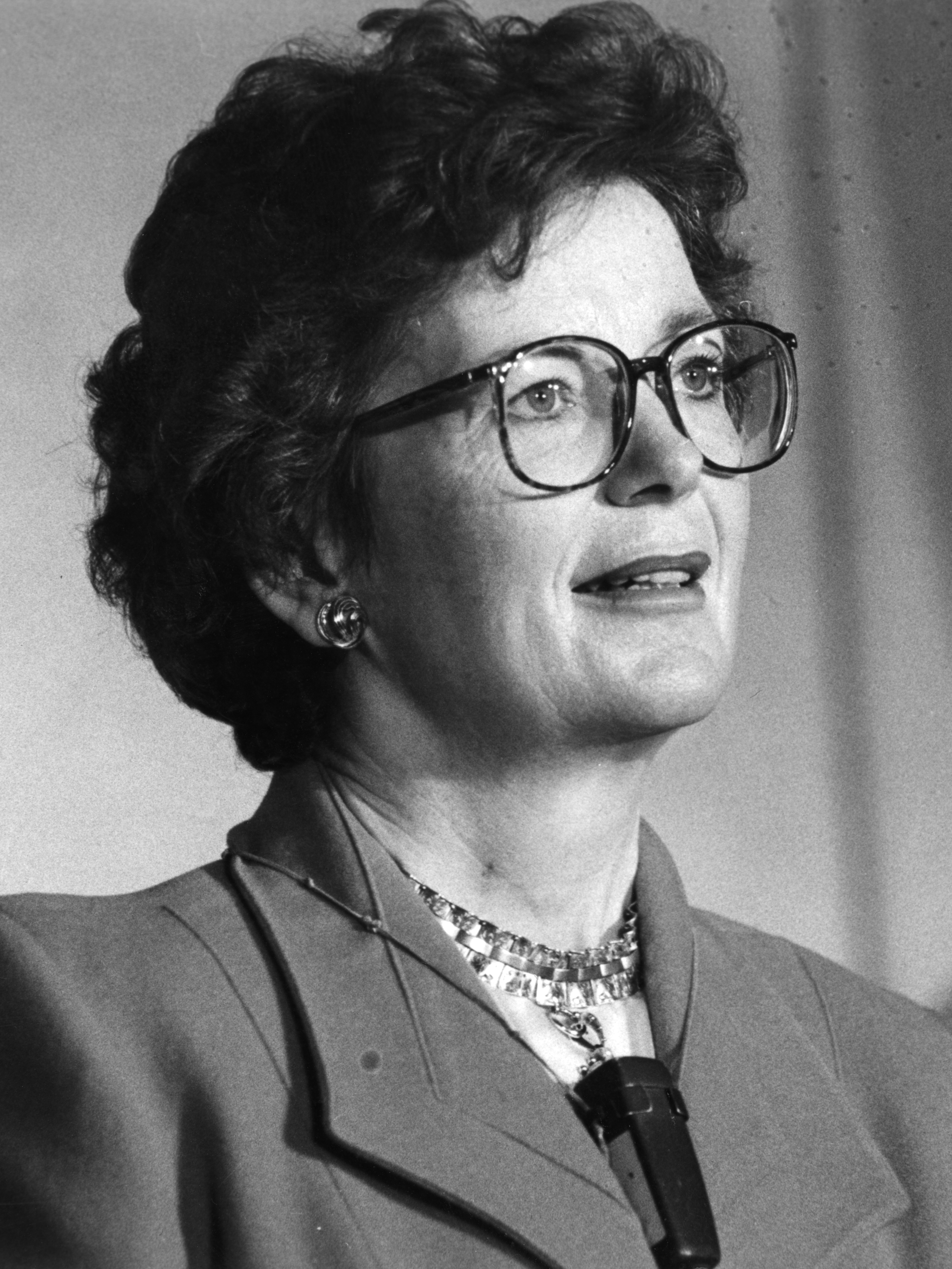
Mary Robinson was a key figure in trying to liberalise contraception laws in Ireland in the 1970s

In early 1971 Senator Mary Robinson sought to introduce a bill to liberalise the law on contraception into the Seanad, but it was not allowed a reading, so it could not be discussed. On 31 March 1971, a number of supporters managed to get into the grounds of Leinster House and then broke into the building to register their protests. On 22 May 1971 a group of Irish feminists from the Irish Women's Liberation Movement, including Mary Kenny, travelled to Belfast by rail and made their return to Dublin Connolly, laden with contraceptive devices, into a statement on the illogicality of the law. This provoked criticism from the Catholic Church; Thomas Ryan, Bishop of Clonfert, said that "... never before, and certainly not since penal times was the Catholic heritage of Ireland subjected to so many insidious onslaughts on the pretext of conscience, civil rights and women's liberation".

At the same time, fringe groups mobilised against reform: conservative Catholic outfits like the Nazareth Family Movement and Mná na hÉireann (Women of Ireland) publicly campaigned to uphold the ban. For example, a 1971 statement by Nazareth warned that legalising contraception would inevitably "lead to the introduction of divorce and abortion". Senator Mary Robinson became a leading reform advocate in the Oireachtas. In 1973, she introduced a private member’s bill to free up contraception. In the same year, the Cork branch of Mná na hÉireann officially "condemned artificial contraception" in a letter to Mary Robinson. Likewise, the Irish Family League (a Catholic lay group) wrote to Taoiseach Liam Cosgrave in 1973 saying the existing laws were "good laws" protecting society from "permissive moral decline".

In 1973, the landmark case of McGee v. The Attorney General came before the Supreme Court. May McGee, a Dublin mother of four who suffered from dangerous pregnancy complications, challenged the seizure of contraceptive jelly she had imported for her own use. In December 1973, the Supreme Court ruled in favour of McGee, holding that the 1935 ban on the importation and sale of contraceptives violated the constitutional right to marital privacy. This ruling was seen as Ireland’s “legal equivalent of the moon landing” in the area of reproductive rights, as Judge Gerard Hogan later described it. Following the McGee decision, married couples could legally import contraceptives for family planning purposes, although the sale of contraceptives within Ireland remained illegal. In the aftermath of the judgment, a number of bills were proposed in the Oireachtas to regulate contraception, but none became law. In 1974, the government introduced the Control of Importation, Sale and Manufacture of Contraceptives Bill, but it was defeated in a free vote, with Taoiseach Liam Cosgrave among those voting against it.

A later Taoiseach, Jack Lynch, admitted at one point that the issue had been put "on the long finger". The Health (Family Planning) Act 1979 limited the provision of contraceptives to "bona fide, … family planning or for adequate medical reasons". Under this scheme, contraceptives could only be dispensed by a pharmacist on the presentation of a valid medical prescription from a practising doctor. The legislation did not require that the recipient of the prescription be married; however "bona fide family planning" would have made non-marital use unlikely to be authorised.

The legislation had been introduced by Charles Haughey. The reason for the compromise was the strong position of conservative elements in Irish society at the time, particularly the Catholic Church, which made it difficult for the government to provide for a more liberal law. Contraception was also not seen by politicians as a vote-getter at the time. Haughey described the 1979 Act as "an Irish solution to an Irish problem". Eileen Desmond, TD, was severely critical of the legislation; describing it as hypocritical, she argued that women should make their own decisions on such matters, and contended that the Irish people and "those who have conditioned our consciences' showed greater moral concern on sexual matters than in addressing poverty". On 1 November 1980 the Act came into operation by order of the minister.

=== 1980s: Continued battles ===
The Health (Family Planning) (Amendment) Act 1985 liberalised the law by allowing condoms and spermicides to be sold to people over 18 without having to present a prescription; however sale was limited to categories of places named in the Act. When the Dáil voted, the bill was carried by the narrow margin of 83–80, reflecting the continued opposition of Fianna Fáil, Church-aligned groups and right-wing activists.

Gay Byrne displays a condom to the audience during a 1987 episode of the Late Late Show.

At the same time, Irish society was slowly changing. Growing awareness of HIV-AIDS prompted unusually frank public discussion of condoms. In 1987, the Late Late Show host Gay Byrne famously demonstrated how to use a condom on live TV; it was an episode that many viewers recall as the first time they had ever seen or heard of a condom. Such events illustrated that older taboos were breaking down; however, studies from the period report that even after 1985, up to half of Irish pharmacists refused to stock condoms, showing the lingering social stigma.

=== 1990s: Normalisation ===
By the 1990s, Ireland’s situation broadly matched the rest of Western Europe. Contraceptive methods were widely accepted as part of healthcare, and no new restrictive laws were introduced. The IFPA and public clinics now freely provided pills, condoms, IUDs and later emergency contraception, similar to neighbouring countries. Socially, younger generations of Irish women and men were far less influenced by Church teaching on this issue, reflecting a wider secularisation. However, Ireland comparably lagged behind its neighbours. For example, other traditionally Catholic countries had already changed long before: Italy legalised contraceptive sales via its Constitutional Court in 1971, Spain lifted bans after Franco’s death, etc. Ireland’s changes in 1979–85 came quite late by comparison. Nevertheless, Historians note that Ireland’s liberalisation was a “social revolution” by local standards.

The Health (Family Planning) (Amendment) Act 1992 repealed Section 4 of the 1979 Act, as amended in 1985, and continued the provision of contraceptives without prescription, allowing sale to individuals over the age of 17. As of 2010, the 1992 Act and the Health (Family Planning) (Amendment) Act 1993 are the main Irish legislation on contraceptive and family planning services.

As well as allowing sales, Ireland's censorship laws had to be reformed to allow contraceptives to be advertised or even mentioned. As late as 1976, the Censorship of Publications Board had banned the Irish Family Planning Association's booklet "Family Planning". The Health (Family Planning) Act 1979 deleted references to "the unnatural prevention of conception" in the 1929 and 1949 censorship Acts, thus allowing publications with information about contraception to be distributed in Ireland. The Regulation of Information (Services Outside the State for the Termination of Pregnancies) Act 1995 modified the 1929, 1946 and 1967 Acts to allow publications with information about "services provided outside the State for the termination of pregnancies".

=== 21st century ===
The Eighth Amendment to the Irish Constitution, which prevented abortion, was repealed in 2018.

As of December 2025, there are more than a dozen contraceptive choices available in Ireland, including the daily pill, condoms and more long-term methods such as the coil. In 2022 contraception, contraceptive consultations, appointments, prescriptions and any other costs were made free for 17- to 26-year-olds under the Government's free contraception scheme. This free provision was extended to 17-to 32-year-olds in 2023 and further extended up to 35-year-olds in July 2024. There are medical professionals available who can guide you through your options and help you find the most appropriate method of contraception for your needs. For those who are not covered by the scheme, a contraceptive consultation costs €60 (or €45 for students).

== See also ==
- Irish Family Planning Association
