= Patrick West =

British writer

Patrick West (born 1974, London) is a British freelance writer and political commentator.

== Early life ==
He is the son of British journalist Richard West and Irish journalist Mary Kenny. his brother is the journalist Ed West.

== Career ==
West has written for The Spectator, New Statesman, The Times Literary Supplement, Standpoint and Spiked.

In 2004, West wrote the monograph Conspicuous Compassion: Why Sometimes It Really Is Cruel to Be Kind on the topic of "recreational grief" being displayed by the British public.

West's 2005 report for Civitas, The Poverty of Multiculturalism, asserted that multiculturalism was losing its hold on public life.

== Works ==
- Get Over Yourself : Nietzsche for Our Times. Andrews UK. 1 August 2017. ISBN 978-1845409333.
- Conspicuous Compassion, Civitas, 2004, ISBN 978-1903386347
- The Poverty of Multiculturalism, Civitas, 2005 ISBN 978-1903386460
- Beating Them At Their Own Game, How The Irish Conquered English Soccer, Liberties Press, 2006 ISBN 978-1905483105
- The Times Questions Answered (editor), HarperCollins, 2004
