= Margaret Gaj =

Restaurant owner and political activist

Margaret Gaj (née Dunlop, 28 January 1919 – 26 June 2011) was a Dublin restaurant owner and political activist.

== Life ==
Margaret Dunlop was born in Scotland in 1919 to Irish parents. From an early age, she had an interest in politics and as a teenager she became a member of the Independent Labour Party.

As a pacifist she joined the Red Cross as a nurse during the Second World War. During her time as a nurse she met a Polish soldier, Boleslaw Gaj, and they married. He was working as an electrician with the RAF, having previously served in the French Air Force after escaping from Poland until France too fell to Nazi Germany.

Unhappy in post-war Britain, Margaret and Boleslaw moved to Ireland in 1948. The Gajs first settled in County Wicklow where they attempt to run a farm. However, they soon pivoted to running a cafe in Baltinglass. Both the Gajs became Irish citizens in 1951. Although popular, a cafe serving Polish cuisine was not profitable enough to survive in 1950s rural Wicklow, and the Gajs thereafter relocated to the more cosmopolitan Dublin. The Gajs set up a restaurant initially in Molesworth Street but then relocated to Baggot Street: As Margaret Gaj increased her political activism during the 1960s and 1970s, the restaurant became famous as a meeting place for Irish left-wing activists.

In the 1960s Margaret became involved in the Dublin Housing Action Committee along with other progressive and left-wing activists. Gaj was one of the five founding members of the Irish Women's Liberation Movement in 1970. They had their meetings in her restaurant on Baggot Street every Monday. Gaj, who was 20 years older or more than most of the other activists in the IWLM, was affectionally referred to as "Mrs Gaj" or "Mother" by the other members.

Other campaigns Gaj was involved in were Irish Voice on Vietnam, Reform (against corporal punishment in schools), anti-drug campaigns, and the Prisoners rights organisation (PRO) which she founded along with Gerry O'Callaghan and future Labour TD Joe Costello.

During the 1960s and early 1970s Gaj was a member of the Irish Labour Party, but was considered to be on the radical left of the party. Gaj took pride when a November 1976 article in the Irish Times described her as an "'awful subversive". When Noel Browne left the Labour party in 1977, she followed him into the short-lived Socialist Labour Party.

She died aged 92 on 26 June 2011.

== Personal life ==
Boneslaw Gaj died in 1975 and Margaret Gaj retired from the restaurant business in 1980. Upon the closure of "Gaj's", she hung a notice on the door thanking her customers but noting "It's not easy to be a socialist in a capitalist society".

The Gajs had two sons; Wladek and Tadek.
