= Nell McCafferty =

Irish journalist and playwright (1944–2024)

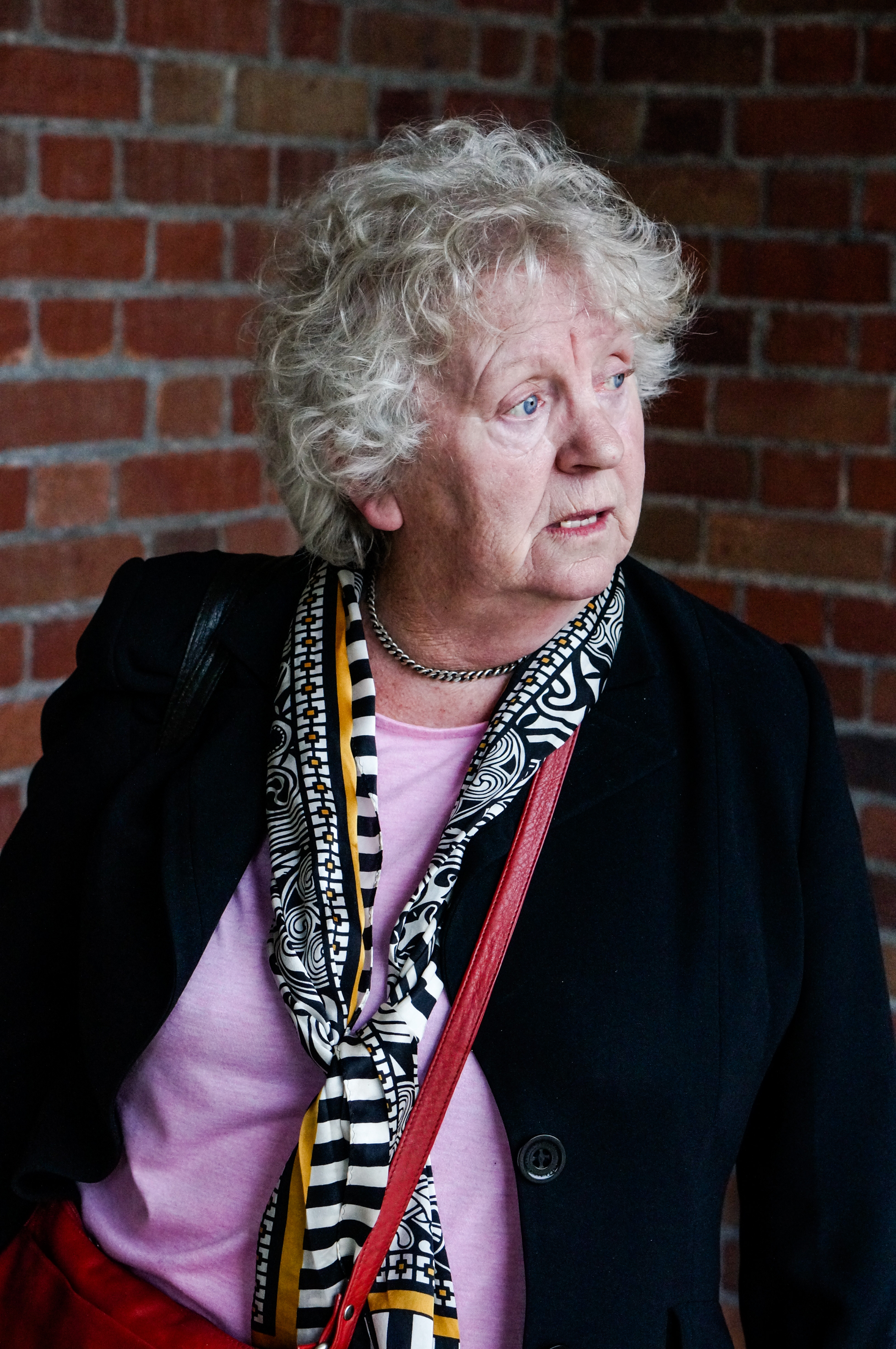
- McCafferty in 2014
- Born: 28 March 1944; Derry, Northern Ireland
- Died: 21 August 2024 (aged 80); Fahan, Ireland
- Education: Queen's University Belfast
- Occupations: Journalist; writer; playwright

Ellen Pamela McCafferty (28 March 1944 – 21 August 2024) was an Irish journalist, playwright, civil rights campaigner and feminist. She wrote for The Irish Press, The Irish Times, Sunday Tribune, Hot Press and The Village Voice.

== Early life ==
McCafferty was born in Derry, Northern Ireland, to Hugh and Lily McCafferty, a devout Catholic, and spent her early years in the Bogside area of the city. She was admitted to Queen's University Belfast (QUB) where she earned a degree in Arts. After a brief spell as a substitute English teacher in Northern Ireland and a stint on a kibbutz in Israel, she took up a post with The Irish Times.

== Career ==
McCafferty was a founding member of the Irish Women's Liberation Movement. Her journalistic writing on women and women's rights reflected her beliefs on the status of women in Irish society. In 1970, she wrote that "Women's Liberation is finding it very hard to explain the difference, when you come down to it, except in terms of physical make-up. And men are as different as women, which no-one holds against them. It's the system which divides. Break the system, unite the people." That same year, she began campaigning against children's courts in Dublin, which sent children as young as seven to "brutal reform schools".

In 1971, she travelled to Belfast with other members of the Irish Women's Liberation Movement in order to protest the prohibition of the importation and sale of contraceptives in the Republic of Ireland. The incident, which attracted publicity, became known as the Contraceptive Train.

After the disintegration of the Irish Women's Liberation Movement, McCafferty remained active in other women's rights groups as well as focusing her journalism on women's rights. She was present at Bloody Sunday in 1972. In the 1980s, she argued that Irish feminists should fight for better living conditions for the female Republican prisoners at Armagh Prison, because "the suffering of women anywhere cannot be ignored by feminists". Her most notable work is her coverage of the Kerry Babies case that is recorded in her book, A Woman to Blame.

McCafferty contributed the piece "Coping with the womb and the border" to the 1984 anthology Sisterhood Is Global: The International Women's Movement Anthology, edited by Robin Morgan.

In 1990, McCafferty won a Jacob's Award for her reports on the 1990 World Cup for RTÉ Radio 1's The Pat Kenny Show. McCafferty lived in Ranelagh, an area of Dublin. McCafferty published her autobiography, Nell, in 2004. In it, she explores her upbringing in Derry, her relationship with her parents, her fears about being gay, the joy of finding a domestic haven with the love of her life, the Irish writer Nuala O'Faolain, and the pain of their separation.

In 2009, after the publication of the Murphy Report into the abuse of children in the Dublin archdiocese, McCafferty confronted Archbishop Diarmuid Martin asking him why the Catholic Church had not, as a "gesture of redemption", relinquished styles of address such as "Your Eminence" and "Your Grace".

McCafferty caused a controversy in 2010 with a declaration in a live Newstalk radio interview that the then Minister for Health, Mary Harney, was an alcoholic. This allegation led to a court case in which Harney was awarded €450,000 the following year. McCafferty very rarely featured on live radio or television in Ireland as a commentator after the incident despite being ever present in those media from 1990 onwards. However, she was featured on a number of recorded shows.

The Irish Times wrote that "Nell's distinctive voice, both written and spoken, has a powerful and provocative place in Irish society."

McCafferty received an honorary doctorate of literature from University College Cork on 2 November 2016 for "her unparalleled contribution to Irish public life over many decades and her powerful voice in movements that have had a transformative impact in Irish society, including the feminist movement, campaigns for civil rights and for the marginalised and victims of injustice".

== Personal life and death ==
McCafferty was in a fifteen-year relationship with the journalist Nuala O'Faolain, beginning in 1980. The couple owned a cottage in west Ireland prior to their acrimonious separation in 1995; they were partly reconciled by the time of O'Faolain's death.

McCafferty died from complications of a stroke at a nursing home in Fahan, Inishowen, County Donegal, on 21 August 2024. She was 80.

A mural of McCafferty was unveiled in March 2025 in the Bogside.

== Bibliography ==
- The Armagh Women. Co-op Books. 1981. ISBN 9780905441382. – female republican protestors and hunger strikers in Armagh Gaol
- A Woman to Blame: the Kerry babies case. Dublin: Attic Press. 1985. ISBN 978-0-946211-22-7.
- Goodnight Sisters: Selected Writings of Nell McCafferty. Dublin: Attic Press. 1987.
- Goodnight, Sisters...: Selected Writings, Volume Two. Dublin: Attic Press. 1987.
- Peggy Deery. A Derry family at war. London: Virago. 1989. ISBN 978-1-85381-075-6.
- Nell. Penguin Ireland. 2004. ISBN 9781844880126.
