= Contraceptive Train =

Feminist protest in 1971 in Ireland

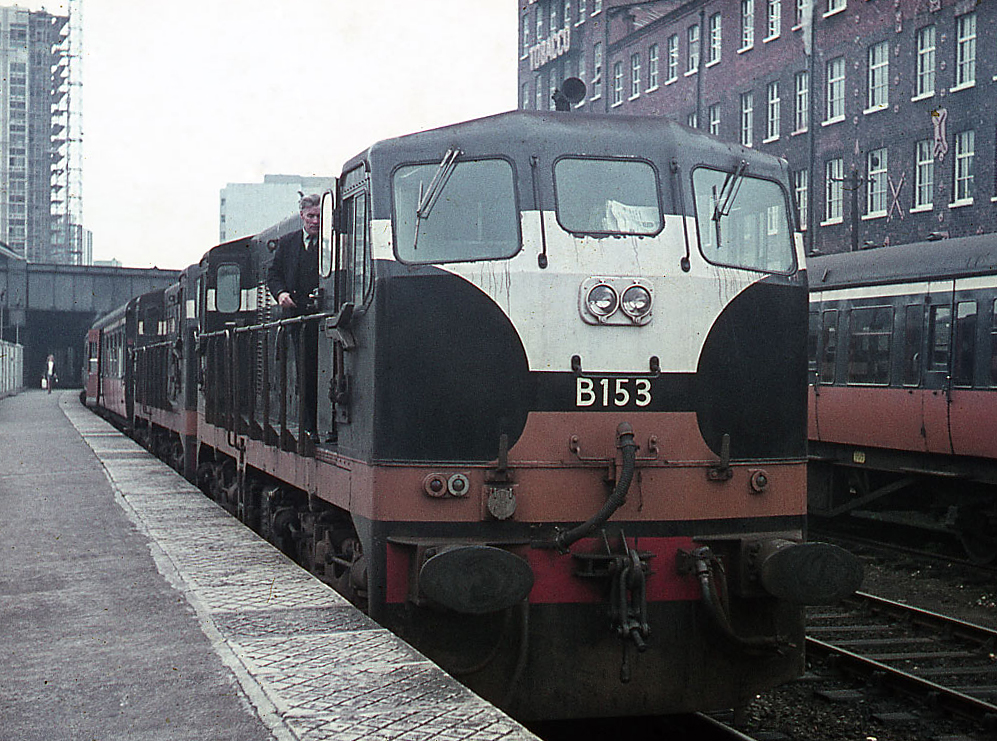
A Dublin-bound train preparing for departure from Belfast in May 1971

The Contraceptive Train was a women's rights activism event which took place on 22 May 1971. Members of the Irish Women's Liberation Movement (IWLM), in protest against the law prohibiting the importation and sale of contraceptives in the Republic of Ireland, travelled to Belfast in Northern Ireland to purchase contraceptives.

== The protest ==
On Saturday, 22 May 1971 the group met at Connolly Station in Dublin and then travelled to Belfast in Northern Ireland to purchase contraceptives, which were banned in the Republic of Ireland. The IWLM members were divided about who should go to Belfast. Some members thought that single women should not go because "buying contraception implied they were having sex before marriage."

Contraception in the Republic of Ireland had been illegal since 1935 under the 1935 Criminal Law (Amendment) Act, and while contraception was legal in Northern Ireland it was restricted, so the women involved could not get the pill without a doctor's prescription (even though they tried). The women bought condoms and spermicide jelly, and instead of buying the pill they bought hundreds of packets of aspirin, as they realized that the majority of the Customs officials would not know what the pill would look like. They were followed by television crews from the United States and Japan, as well as Ireland.

On arrival back at Connolly Station, there were demonstrating protesters waiting for them. At customs, the women involved loudly declared what they had purchased and refused to hand over the contraceptives. Some women publicly swallowed the aspirin in defiance of the law, pretending that they were the pill. Others waved the contraceptives in the air as they passed through the station.

Women who were involved with the Contraceptive Train put themselves at risk of being detained or prosecuted for bringing birth control into Ireland. They also risked social stigma from their families and friends.

== Legacy ==
This action was a landmark moment in the Irish women's movement: it helped break the "taboo against discussing contraceptive practice." It also made a "powerful statement" which raised awareness of the issue surrounding women and contraception. The event received a large amount of press coverage.

== See also ==
- Contraception in the Republic of Ireland
