= Squatting in Ireland =

Occupation of unused land or derelict buildings in the Republic of Ireland

Ireland on map in dark green

Squatting in Ireland is the occupation of unused land or derelict buildings without the permission of the owner. In the 1960s, the Dublin Housing Action Committee highlighted the housing crisis by squatting buildings. From the 1990s onwards there have been occasional political squats in Cork and Dublin such as Grangegorman, the Barricade Inn, the Bolt Hostel, Connolly Barracks, That Social Centre and James Connolly House.

== The legality of squatting in Ireland ==
Dublin Housing Action Committee's campaigning in the late 1960s resulted in some successes but also the Prohibition of Forcible Entry and Occupation Act of 1971, which criminalized squatting. Squatters can gain title to land and property by adverse possession as governed by the 1957 Statute of Limitations Act. An occupant is entitled to apply to the Property Registration Authority for legal possession provided they are in continuous and uninterrupted occupation of the property without the permission of the owner for 12 years. If the land is owned by the state the period is 30 years.

However, in practice, success is rare. Owners often perform "limited acts", such as paying insurance or entering the property, which disrupt continuous possession. For example, In 2004 a squatter who had occupied a building for 16 years was unable to gain title because the owner had been paying for insurance on the house, while in 2008 radio presenter Pat Kenny failed to gain title to land owned by his neighbour attempting to use adverse possession. To date, no communal squats have lasted the full required period unchecked.

Additionally, breaking in is criminal, and trespassing with intent (especially to damage or steal) is prosecutable in Ireland. Squatters are vulnerable to these charges. Squatters can be evicted without compensation or notice.

== History ==
Squatting in Ireland was mentioned in letters in 1846, but by 1870 the issue was said to be in the past. "Squatters' land" between the Sorrento and Coliemore Roads in the Dublin village of Dalkey was mentioned in a housing development undertaken by Richard MacDonnell in the year 1840.

Irish Travellers wanted houses in Ireland in the 1970s and used squatting as a tactic to gain them. The Dublin Housing Action Committee (DHAC) was active between 1968 and 1971. It would occupy buildings to protest the housing crisis and support those who were imprisoned. Dennis Dennehy had previously squatted in Birmingham and London. He was arrested and imprisoned in 1969 after occupying 20 Mountjoy Square the previous year. When he decided to go on hunger strike, it galvanised protests over housing. There were nightly marches to Mountjoy Prison and blockades of O'Connell Bridge. The Dublin Trades Council supported him and President Éamon de Valera was heckled. Later in 1969, three men were imprisoned after the eviction of the Carlton Hotel on Harcourt Street and five activists barricaded themselves inside a room at the Four Courts.

In 1971, a case of squatting in the village of Carnaross, County Meath involving a dispute between a local family and the Irish Land Commission was featured on the Irish current affairs television programme 7 Days.

Many young people emigrated from Ireland in the 1980s and squatted in London. In Dublin, there was a political squat on Arran Quay in 1995.

=== 2000s ===
Housing activists occupied a building on Parnell Square, Dublin in July 2003 which they labelled "Disco Disco" but were evicted within 24 hours. From 2003 to 2004 the Magpie Squat was a residential space which housed activists on Upper Leeson Street. It had a library and a vegetable garden. Seomra Spraoi, an anarchist, rented, self-managed social center, opened its doors in 2004 and ran until 2015.

=== 2010s ===
In the 2010s, with the construction of ghost estates across the country there was a rise in occupations in rural areas. A man in Tullamore, County Offaly defeated a claim for possession in court when the judge saw the improvements he had made to his squat, on an empty estate. Activists from Occupy Cork squatted a National Asset Management Agency (NAMA) building in Cork at Christmas 2011, with the intention of using it as a community resource centre.

==== Grangegorman squat and Barricade Inn ====
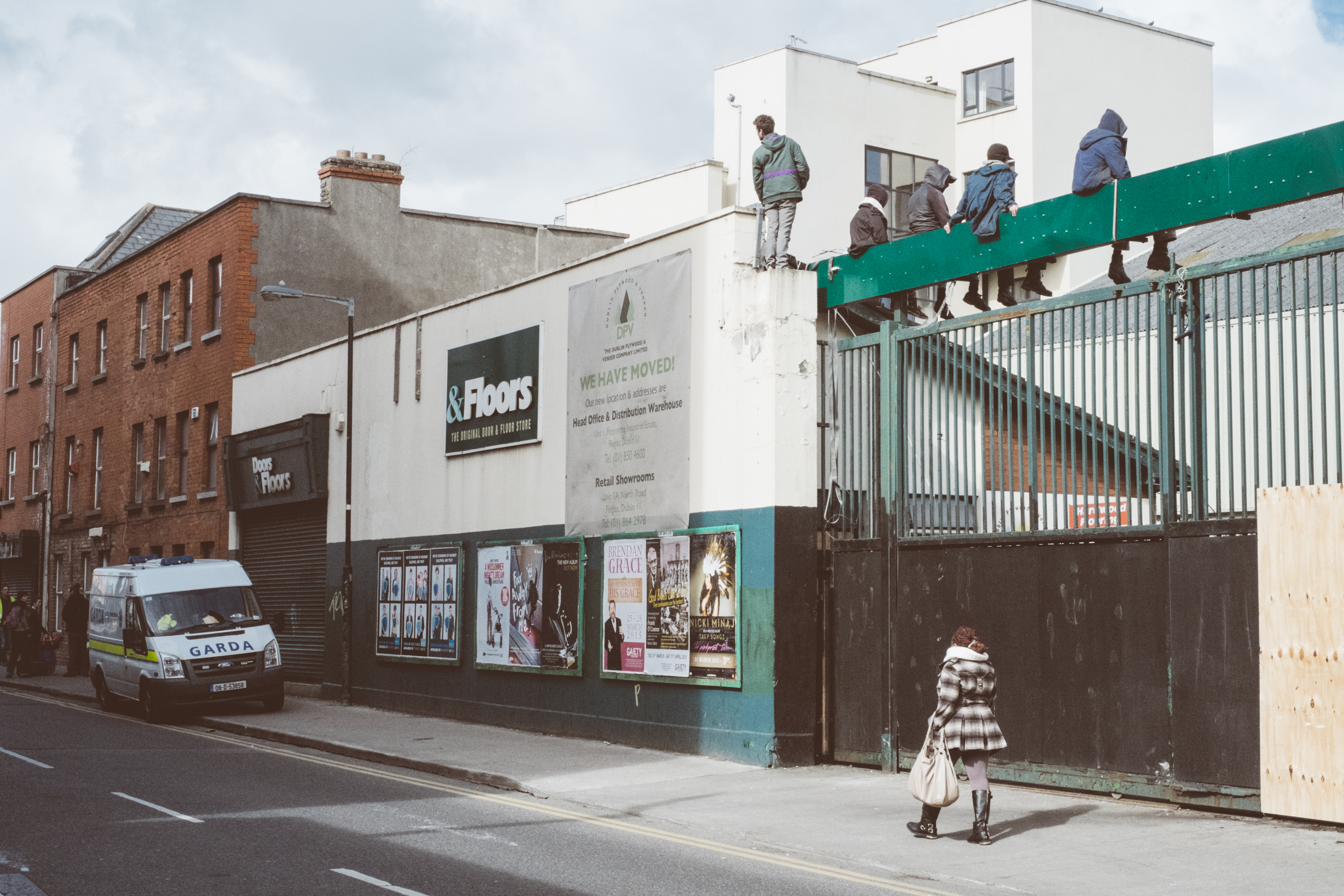
Photograph capturing the moment when the Garda Siochana arrive to carry out evictions at the Grangegorman squat

The Barricade Inn

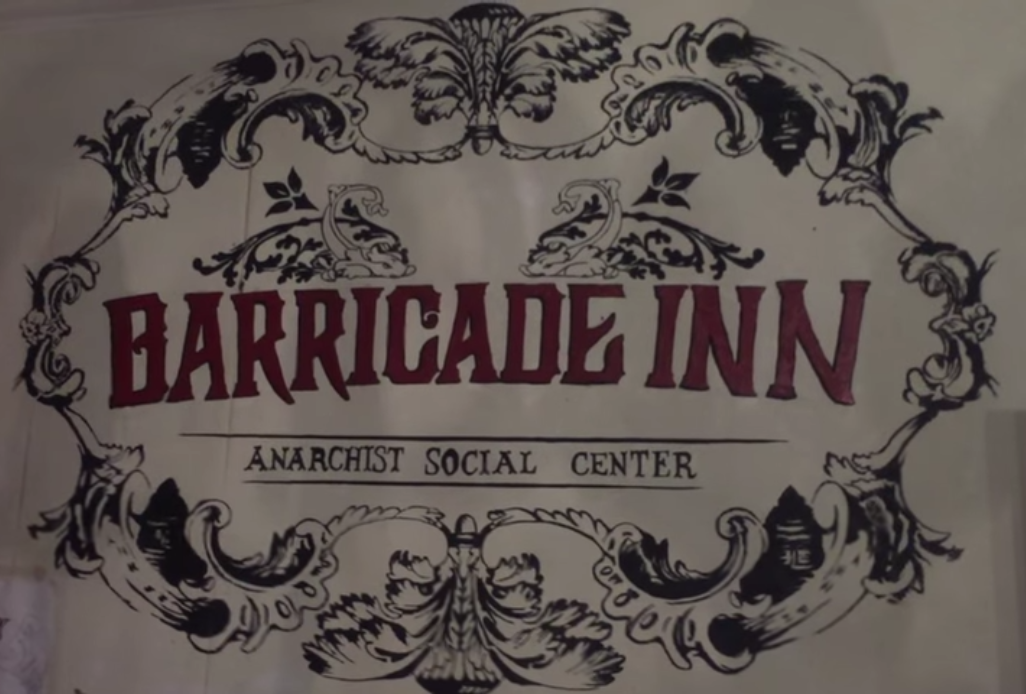
Emblem used on the inside of the Barricade Inn

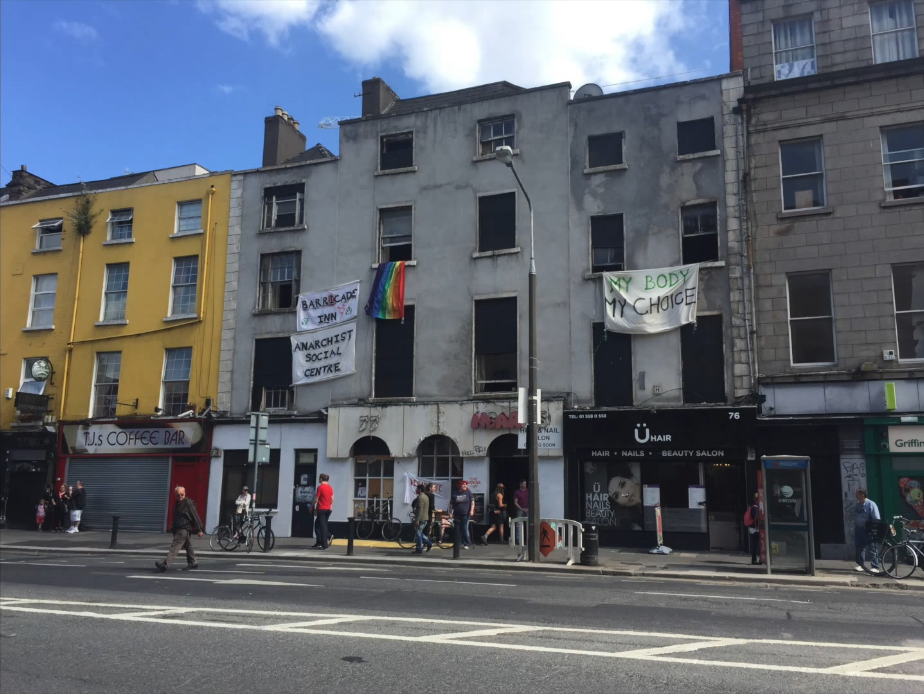
The outside of the Barricade Inn

The Barricade Inn on Parnell Street operated for roughly one year between 2015 and 2016

Dublin hosted the 2014 International Squatter Convergence, which had previously been held in cities such as Brighton, Dijon, Berlin and Leeds. Events were hosted by Seomra Spraoi. In 2013 a new squat known as "The Grangegorman squat" emerged; Its presence was not generally known until 2015 when it successfully resisted evictions for a time. The news of the successful resistance spread across social media and international news. The squat was publicly supported by the Lord Mayor Christy Burke and by Irish Times journalist Una Mullally, before being evicted in 2016, with the site later developed into student accommodation for those attending Dublin IT. A building which once housed Neary's Hotel on Parnell Street in Dublin's north inner city, was occupied in 2015 and renamed The Barricade Inn by the squatters. The Inn, operated by Anarchists aligned with the Workers Solidarity Movement, housed over two dozen residents who also operated a cafe and music venue from the building. Following a court order, The Barricade Inn and its residents were evicted by court order in February 2016. The former Neary's Hotel hotel site resumed a state of dereliction after the eviction, and was still vacant as of July 2025.

Illegal evictions also occur, such as a 2015 case in which three men were convicted of false imprisonment.

==== Debtors' Prison ====
In August 2016, a group of squatters which had been recently evicted from a nearby Grangegorman squat complex, began occupying the Debtors' Prison in Dublin's north inner city with the stated aim of converting the building into a community art space. Having occupied the building, the State announced that the squatters had to vacate, citing health and safety concerns. The occupants sought support and cooperation from the Office of Public Works, as well as the local community with their stated intention being to restore the building and open the ground floor "for exhibitions and walking tours which would highlight social injustices from the past until today". In mid-August 2016, an injunction was granted against the squatters, with an order for them to vacate the building by midnight on Sun 21 August 2016. The squatters were threatened with jail time if they did not leave the premises.

==== Bolt Hostel ====
During the summer of 2015, left-wing housing activists took over a youth hostel in Dublin's North Inner City that had been deemed "not fit for purpose" by Dublin City Council three years previously and shut down. The property had sat vacant awaiting an upgrade, a status the activists deemed unconscionable due to the shortage of housing in Dublin. The activists attempted to re-activate the building, located on Bolton Street and referred to as the "Bolt Hostel", but were made to leave the premise a number of weeks later following a court order. At the time of the court order, the Council claimed it was "ironic" that the activists felt the need to occupy the building, because the council said they had already secured planning permission to redevelop the building. However, by 2019 no such development had taken place and the possibility of the building being sold for a token amount of money to a local housing charity was being openly discussed.

==== Apollo House and the "Home Sweet Home" campaign ====
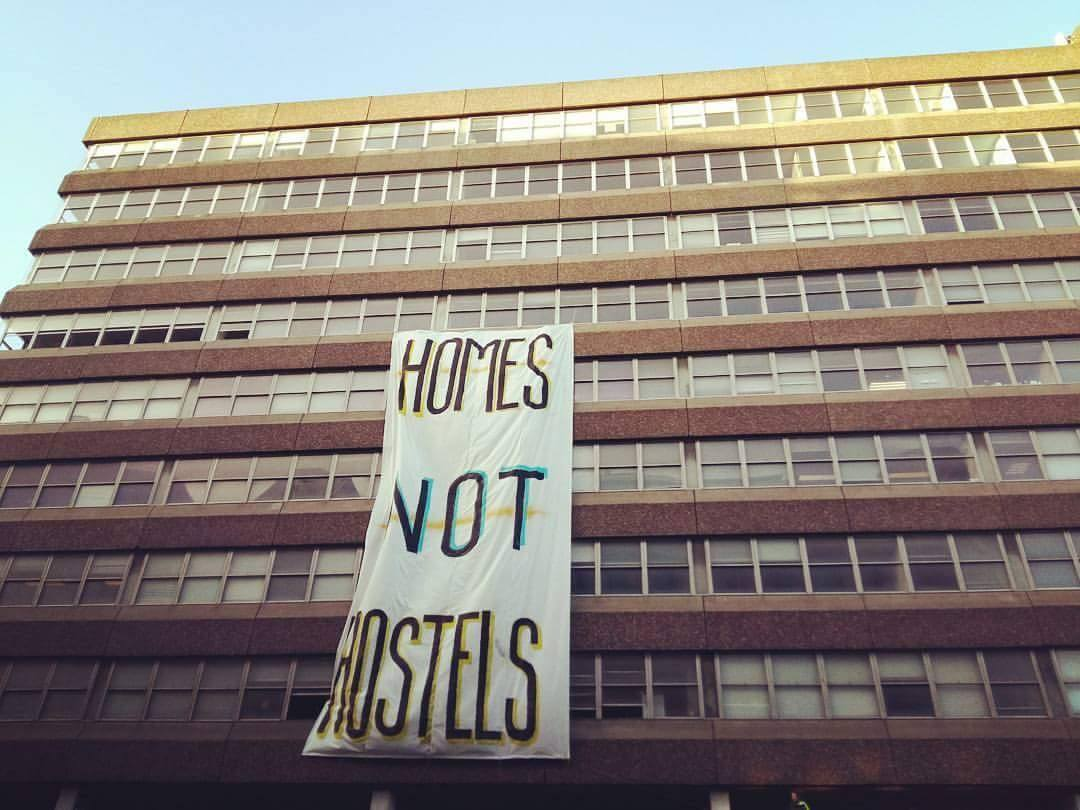
Apollo House during its brief but high-profile occupation in December 2016

In December 2016 Apollo House, a 9-storey office block in Dublin City Centre, was taken over by squatters who attempted to convert it into a homeless shelter. The building, which had previously been used as office space for various companies, had fallen under the control of National Asset Management Agency by 2016 in the wake of the Post-2008 Irish economic downturn. A large group of activists working under the banner of "Home Sweet Home" occupied the building and subsequently housed over 200 homeless in the building during the Christmas period. The occupation drew considerable national attention in Ireland and drew the support of many high-profile Irish artists such as Glen Hansard, Christy Dignam, Jim Sheridan, Kodaline, Hozier, Damien Dempsey, John Connors and Saoirse Ronan as well as political parties such as Sinn Féin. In January 2017 a court ordered the residents to leave the premises, which they did voluntarily on 12 January without incident. In the years immediately following, Apollo House was bought and demolished by a property developer.

==== Connolly Barracks in Cork City ====
In August 2017 members of the Connolly Youth Movement in Cork City began a squat in the Mardyke area, not far from University College Cork, which was later dubbed "Connolly Barracks". Alex Homits of CYM cited the occupation of Apollo House as inspiring the move. In contrast to anarchist squats, the residents of Connolly Barracks tout that the building is run under an extremely strict set of rules, reflecting the Marxist–Leninist orientation of the Connolly Youth Movement. The use of the term "Barracks" was chosen to mirror this mentality. As of 2022, it is still in operation.

==== Take Back The City, Dublin ====
In August and September 2018, a group known as Take Back The City were behind a "string of protest actions occupying vacant buildings in Dublin city centre", according to the Irish Times, in order to "protest about the housing crisis". The group included activists from Dublin Central Housing Action, student group Take Back Trinity, and Dublin Renters' Union.

Activists from Take Back The City began occupying 35 Summerhill Parade, a vacant property, in early August 2018, but shortly afterwards were moved on and found a new vacant building to occupy at 34 North Frederick Street. On 28 August 2018, Patricia Ní Greil, the owner of the building, secured a High Court injunction ordering the squatters to leave the building, which they defied. On 11 September 2018, several men in balaclavas entered the building, protected by members of the Garda Siochana, and removed the protestors from the building by force. Six arrests were made.

As of 12 September 2018, it was mentioned by the Irish Times that the group were still occupying a vacant property on Belvedere Court (near Mountjoy Square).

=== 2020s ===
==== That Social Centre in Stoneybatter ====
On 12 September 2021 a group began squatting a building that had laid vacant for 10 years in the Stoneybatter neighbourhood of Dublin. The group began operating "That Social Centre" a.k.a. "Sunnyvale"; offering free services such as a cafe and a bike repair shop. Five weeks later, on the morning of 27 October, a large group of private security guards, in view of some despatched Gardaí, attempted to evict the squatters from the premises. A fracas ensued that was captured on video and then posted to social media. Although the security guards were able to enter the squat and destroy the interior, a counter-demonstration quickly mounted what almost devolved into a riot, at which point the Gardaí moved to break up the two groups and sent the security guards away. By that evening, the squatters re-entered the building and a large crowd gathered to support them. The incident prompted much discussion within Irish media, with many newspapers suggesting the incident was a symptom of a deepening housing crisis in Ireland and Dublin in particular. In late November 2021 a high court judge ordered the squatters to leave the property and subsequently the squat was ended. The group subsequently occupied a space in Phibsborough, which took on the "That Social Centre" name, distinguished from the previous "Sunnyvale" squat as "Shopfronts" due to it being composed partially of several dilapidated shopfronts in Phibsborough. The Shopfronts squat was vacated over the Christmas 2023 period as it became clear legal proceedings were rapidly reaching a similar result As of January 2024 the group has squatted a new building, and are continuing to operate as before.

==== Connolly House on Eden Quay ====
In May 2022 a socialist republican group called the Revolutionary Workers Union (RWU) seized a property on Eden Quay in Dublin and dubbed it "James Connolly House". The group claimed to refurbish the building, which they said was derelict, and were operating it as a homeless shelter amongst other uses. The Times reported that the building was owned by the Salvation Army who claimed the building was in the process of being refurbished for use by refugees from the Russo-Ukrainian War. The Salvation Army criticised the RWU for disrupting their work while the RWU claimed there was no evidence that the building was being refurbished before their arrival. In late May the High Court ruled that the squatters must leave and in early June, after the RWU said they would not abide by the order, they were evicted by the Garda Síochána.

==== Revolutionary Housing League ====
Following the events on Eden Quay, the Revolutionary Workers Union created a new organisation called the Revolutionary Housing League, whose primary function is to create squats as a political tactic. Since June 2022, the organisation has created several squats, primarily in Dublin, although these are usually short-lived, as their tactic of publicising their actions often results in a rapid response from An Garda Siochana.

In May 2026, the Revolutionary Housing League occupied the long-vacant Ardee House pub in Dublin's Liberties and announced plans to reopen the building as the "Anne Devlin Community Centre". The occupation became public on 25 May after activists invited local residents into the premises and stated that they intended to develop the site into a community space and cafe. The property had been closed since 2010 and has been owned by Black Sheep Investments since 2017. Members of the group said they had cleaned and repaired parts of the building, restored electricity and running water, and received offers of assistance from local tradespeople. The RHL described the action as a response to the lack of community facilities in the Liberties and to the broader condition of working-class areas in Dublin. The occupation prompted a Garda public order response on 25 May after the property owner, whiskey entrepreneur Jack Teeling, became aware of the situation. Gardaí attended the premises during the afternoon, while supporters gathered outside following social media calls for solidarity. The confrontation ended without escalation, and most officers later withdrew. Local residents quoted in coverage of the occupation expressed support for the project, citing concerns about the growth of hotels and student accommodation in the area without corresponding community infrastructure. Before the occupation, Black Sheep Investments had submitted plans to redevelop the site into 14 apartments with a ground-floor community facility, although Dublin City Council had ruled the planning application invalid pending resubmission.

On 27 May 2026, the High Court heard that the RHL remained inside Ardee House despite repeated demands from Black Sheep Investments to vacate the building following their 25 May occupation. The owners argued that the disused pub was structurally unsafe and had been assessed as unsuitable for public use, and said they only became fully aware of the scale of the occupation through media reporting. The court was told the occupants had made internal alterations and were planning a public event involving food and possibly unlicensed alcohol service. Finding sufficient evidence of ongoing trespass and health and safety risk, the judge granted urgent injunctions restraining the occupation and any interference with the property, ordered service of the decision at the premises and via online contact details, and listed the case to return on 3 June 2026.

==== 15 Usher's Island ====
From 28 July 2024, a group naming itself 'Independent Minds', began squatting number 15 Usher's Island on the Dublin quays, an eighteenth-century building made famous by being the setting for the events in James Joyce's short story The Dead from Dubliners (1914).

The activists stated aim was to highlight the issue of homelessness in Dublin, corruption in the Irish housing market, and to call for the building to be restored and created into a museum to Joyce and 'The Dead'. Poet Paula Meehan opined that the building was "tailor-made" to serve as a place "to house visiting writers and artists internationally". The building was still being occupied as of March 2025.

== See also ==
- Homelessness in Ireland
