= Máirín de Burca =

Irish writer, journalist and activist

General Secretary of Sinn Féin
- In office c. 1966–1970
- Succeeded by: herself, as General Secretary of Official Sinn Féin

General Secretary of Official Sinn Féin
- In office 1970–1977
- Preceded by: herself, as General Secretary of Sinn Féin

Personal details
- Born: 1938 (age 87–88)
- Party: Sinn Féin (1950s to 1969); Official Sinn Féin (1970 onwards)

Máirín de Burca (born 1938) is an Irish writer, journalist and political and social activist. In a career spanning more than six decades, she was a leading figure in Sinn Féin and Official Sinn Féin, a founding member of the Irish Women's Liberation Movement, and a central figure in the Dublin Housing Action Committee as well as the Prisoners' Rights Organisation. She is particularly well known, alongside the journalist Mary Anderson, for a legal challenge that forced a change in Irish law to enable women and people without property to serve on juries.

De Burca was General Secretary of Sinn Féin during the 1969 split between the Provisionals and the Officials, and she continued in the role of General Secretary of Official Sinn Féin until her resignation in 1977. She was also a prominent anti-Vietnam War and anti-apartheid protester, was jailed for burning the American flag outside the United States embassy in Dublin, and was arrested for throwing eggs at Richard Nixon's car during his 1970 visit to Ireland. In 2017, she was awarded an honorary Doctor of Law by University College Dublin in recognition of her activism, and in 2018 she was the subject of a feature documentary, Five Red Roses, directed by Cathal Black.

== Early life ==
Sources differ on the precise circumstances of de Burca's birth. A 2023 newspaper review of her biography states that she was born in Chicago in 1938., while an academic thesis records that she was born in Dublin in 1938 after her mother, though a naturalised United States citizen along with her father, returned home to give birth. Both accounts agree that de Burca spent her early childhood between Ireland and the United States.

Her older brother, Patrick, died of pneumonia at the age of six, a loss from which her Irish Catholic parents never fully recovered, and de Burca has said she grew up feeling like "a second-class citizen" in the family. Her family later informally adopted a boy, Michael, who became her mother's favourite, deepening this sense of neglect. The family moved back to Ireland in 1947, when de Burca was around nine years old, with her father joining them upon his retirement in 1951. Looking back on her upbringing decades later, de Burca reflected that the neglect she experienced as a child may, in the end, have been of some benefit to her.

De Burca was educated at convent schools in both Ireland and the United States. She left school at thirteen or fourteen without having learned Irish and so was unable to sit the Leaving Certificate, and took a job as a draper's or haberdashery assistant for five shillings a week. She has said that her main ambition at the time, fed by wide reading at the local library, was to join the "freedom struggle" and Sinn Féin.

== Sinn Féin ==
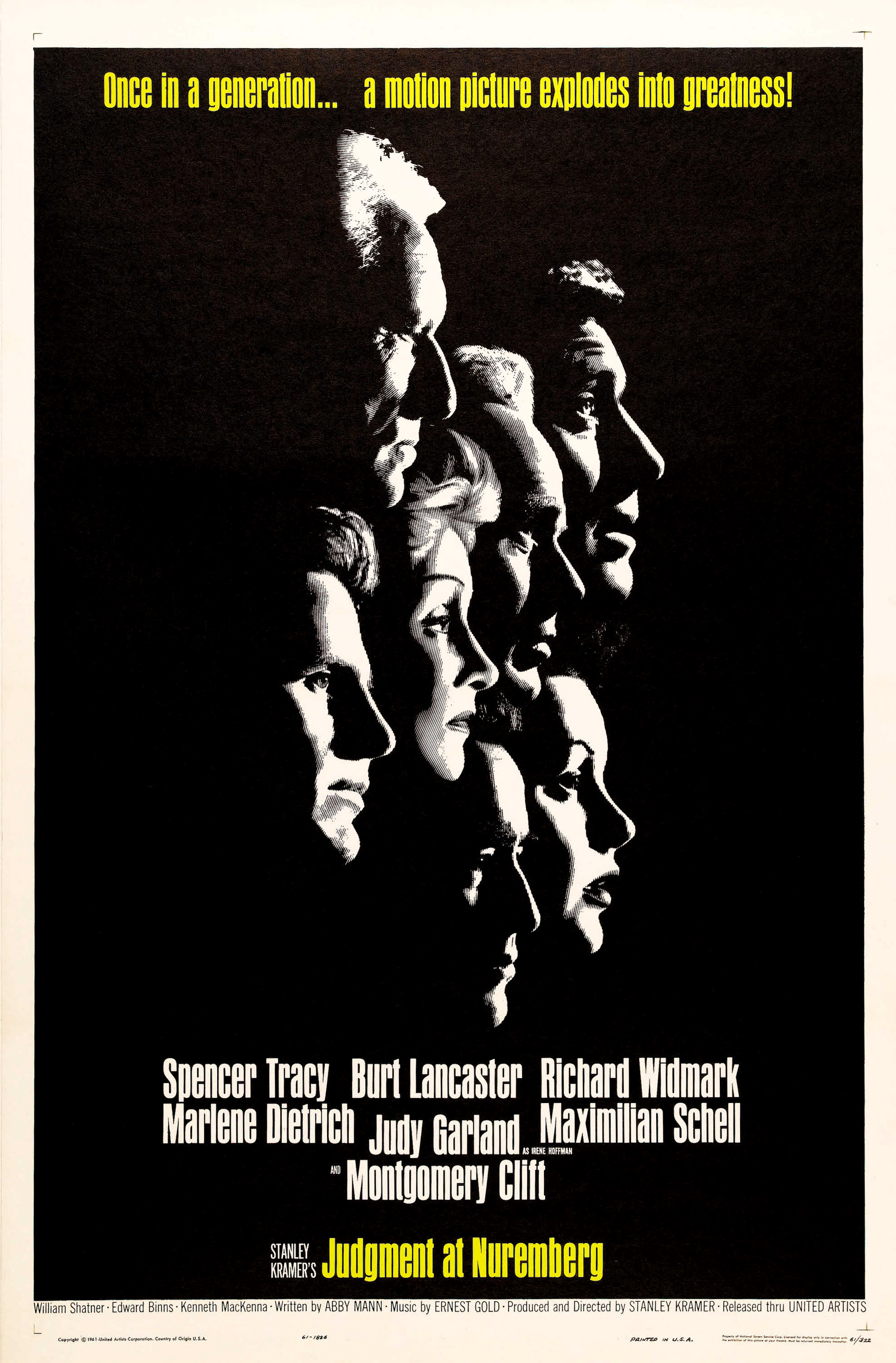
The film Judgment at Nuremberg had a significant influence on the political views of de Burca

De Burca joined Sinn Féin as a teenager in the 1950s and became a party activist from an early age. In her early involvement with the movement, she was, by her own account, an enthusiastic supporter of physical-force Irish republicanism and at one point stored gelignite in her flat, until it was removed by a fellow Sinn Féin member after it began to smell. After watching the film Judgment at Nuremberg around 1962, she reconsidered her views on political violence and became, for the rest of her life, a committed pacifist and public opponent of the Provisional IRA, even at a time when doing so was dangerous within republican circles.

=== Siding with the Officials ===
She left her job to work full-time for Sinn Féin from September 1969, and went on to serve as General Secretary of the party. Following the 1969 to 1970 split between the "Official" and "Provisional" wings of the party, de Burca sided with the Officials and soon afterwards became General Secretary of Official Sinn Féin. As part of the party's International Affairs Bureau, she undertook tours abroad on the movement's behalf, including a tour of England, Norway, Denmark and the Netherlands in April 1974 and a shorter tour of West Germany that October.

She was the Official Sinn Féin candidate at the 1973 general election for the Dublin North-Central constituency. She received 1,667 (4.8%) first-preference votes but was not elected. She also stood in the 1974 Irish local elections as an Official Sinn Féin candidate for Dublin City Council; she received 4.8% and did not gain a seat.

Within the party, de Burca opposed the introduction of examinations for probationary members undergoing political education, and succeeded in having the proposal voted down with the backing of party leader Tomás Mac Giolla. She also grew increasingly uneasy with the influence of secretive internal groupings within the party, which she felt scrutinised members' loyalty in an intrusive manner. Worn out by the demands of party work alongside her many other campaigns, she resigned as General Secretary in early 1977, saying simply that she was "just tired" and that leaving, though sad, was the right decision. She remained a party member after her resignation.

== Anti-war and anti-apartheid activism ==
De Burca was a prominent opponent of the Vietnam War and of apartheid in South Africa, and was a member of the Irish Voice on Vietnam and the Irish Anti-Apartheid Movement. In April 1971, she took part in a protest at which cow's blood was smashed over the steps of the American embassy in Dublin and the American flag was taken down and burned; for this she spent three months in Mountjoy Prison. A year earlier, on 5 October 1970, she and a fellow activist bought eggs and threw them at Richard Nixon's car during his visit to Dublin; she later recalled that "luckily for us, the judge didn't seem to like Nixon either", and the pair were fined and released. The FBI subsequently opened a file on her, describing her in one report as "the Republic's leading woman political agitator". Nell McCafferty later wrote that de Burca was arrested seventeen times over an eighteen-month period during this phase of her activism.

As part of the anti-apartheid campaign, de Burca rode her moped to Bray, County Wicklow, to join activists blowing whistles through the night to disrupt the sleep of the touring South African Springboks rugby team.

== Dublin Housing Action Committee ==
De Burca was a founding member of the Dublin Housing Action Committee (DHAC), formed in May 1967 to campaign against poor housing conditions and evictions in Dublin. Alongside fellow activists Sean Dunne and Seán Ó Cionnaith, she regularly wrote letters to the editors of national newspapers publicising the Committee's activities, and these letters were frequently published. The historian Sinead McEneaney has argued that DHAC activists, including de Burca, may deliberately have provoked confrontations with Gardaí in the hope of generating newsworthy coverage of the housing campaign. She later wrote a series of articles on the Dublin housing crisis for the magazine Hibernia, describing landlords deliberately allowing dwellings to fall into disrepair to force out protected tenants.

== Irish Women's Liberation Movement ==
De Burca was a founding member of the Irish Women's Liberation Movement (IWLM), set up in the summer of 1970 to campaign for changes to the political and social status of women in Ireland. The group's core members, Mary Maher, Mairin Johnston, Máirín de Burca and Moira Woods, were brought together by Margaret Gaj, owner of the Dublin restaurant Gaj's on Baggot Street, which became the movement's regular Monday-night meeting place. Journalist and writer Rosita Sweetman, writing in the Irish Independent, described Gaj's as functioning like "our Left Bank, Greenwich Village, Colony Club all rolled into one".

In March 1971, the IWLM published its manifesto, Chains or Change, which set out demands including equal pay, an end to the marriage bar, equal rights in law, and access to contraception. De Burca and her co-founder Mairin Johnston pressed for the manifesto to include a "one family, one house" housing demand, though this was ultimately left out of the published document amid concern among other members that it strayed too far into broader socialist territory.

In 1971, the IWLM organised the Contraceptive Train, on which a group of around 47 women travelled to Belfast to buy contraceptives (then illegal in the Republic of Ireland) and openly bring them back across the border. De Burca made the deliberate decision not to take part, fearing that, as an unmarried woman, her presence would provoke a hostile reaction and alienate the more conservative women the movement hoped to reach. The IWLM itself lasted less than a year, dissolving amid internal disagreement over priorities and the competing demands on its members' time, but de Burca later maintained that the movement had nonetheless succeeded in its aims.

De Burca also wrote on feminist theory and history for party publications. In a 1975 article for the Official Sinn Féin journal Teoiric, she argued that the movement's internal culture needed reform, writing that "we cannot agitate on behalf of women and ignore the women in our own movement". In 1980, at the Merriman Summer School in Ballyvaughan, County Clare, she delivered a feminist critique of Brian Merriman's 18th-century poem The Midnight Court, arguing that "I don't believe that men can write intelligently of women's oppression", a view that provoked a sharp reaction from her audience.

== Prisoners' Rights Organisation and other activism ==
De Burca spent a week in prison in 1971 for her anti-war activism, an experience that led her to help found the Prisoners' Rights Organisation (PRO) in 1973. She was invited, alongside former prisoner Brendan Walsh, to speak at a University College Dublin meeting on prison conditions that led to the organisation's formation. The PRO campaigned for prison conditions to be made rehabilitative rather than punitive, and for a set of prisoners' rights including proper medical and psychiatric care.

In 1975, the organisation shifted its focus to a cluster of suicides and attempted suicides among young men held in custody, and began picketing the home of Richard Crowe, the senior civil servant responsible for the prison system. De Burca took part in the first picket at Crowe's home on 3 May 1975, where activists carried placards reading "Cooney and Crowe Judicial Murderers". The High Court granted Crowe an injunction against further picketing, but de Burca was among those who defied it. Later that year, she was one of six PRO activists, including Margaret Gaj and her son Wladek Gaj, arrested and charged under the Offences Against the State Act after leaflets concerning the case of prisoner Karl Crawley were left on jury benches at his trial. The six were convicted and initially sentenced to twelve months in prison; on appeal, the conviction was upheld, but the group was given the benefit of the Probation Act, meaning none of them served time. De Burca was also a member of the Irish Council for Civil Liberties. and, separately, of the campaign group Right to Die Ireland.

In 1978, she was commissioned by the feminist publisher Arlen House to write a book on women in Ireland's prisons, working with editor Margaret MacCurtain.

== Juries Act case ==
De Burca is particularly noted for a legal case, taken with the journalist Mary Anderson, that changed Irish law on jury service. The case arose after de Burca and Anderson were arrested and charged with breach of the peace during a protest outside Dáil Éireann over housing. When their solicitor suggested they opt for trial by jury, the barrister Mary Robinson advised that the more effective course was to challenge the constitutionality of the Juries Act 1927 itself, which excluded women and those without property from jury service. The two women, represented by Mary Robinson and Donal Barrington, pursued the case through the courts, and it was decided by the Supreme Court on 12 December 1975, in their favour. The judgment paved the way for the Juries Act 1976, which allows any Irish citizen aged 18 or over who is registered to vote in general elections to serve on a jury.

De Burca has said this was the achievement she was proudest of, describing her many other campaigns on women's rights, equality, housing and prisoners' rights, as comparatively minor by contrast.

== Journalism and writing ==
After leaving her position with Sinn Féin in 1977, de Burca struggled to find work, and has said that her reputation as an activist made employers reluctant to hire her, to the point that she was turned down for a job in a hamburger packing plant once her political history became known. During this period she moved into a small cottage without a telephone or bathroom, and took on freelance writing work, sometimes publishing under a pseudonym. She later worked as a typist before joining Hibernia magazine as a full-time journalist on 14 September 1978, moving to The Sunday Times after Hibernia went bankrupt.

== Later life and legacy ==
Despite her long record of activism, de Burca is considered a militant pacifist. In a 2000 radio interview with Pat Kenny, broadcast on International Women's Day alongside fellow campaigner Nell McCafferty, de Burca reflected on how far Ireland had changed for women since the 1970s, while noting that equal pay had still not been achieved.

In 2017, de Burca was awarded an honorary Doctor of Law by University College Dublin. In 2020, artist Jesse Jones spent a creative residency at the King's Inns in Dublin, during which she met regularly with de Burca at her home in Marino, while researcher Lisa Godson recorded an oral history that, together with de Burca's personal archive, was subsequently held at the King's Inns library. The residency resulted in a permanent Portland stone sculpture, The Left Arm of Commerce, depicting de Burca's arm and hand holding a copy of the Constitution of Ireland, which Jones said was intended to honour de Burca's role as a "radical litigant" who showed how "we can sometimes change the law itself" by breaking it.

In 2018, de Burca was the subject of Five Red Roses, a feature documentary directed by Cathal Black, subtitled "one for every syllable of your name", which premiered at the Galway Film Fleadh. In 2023, the historian Brian Kenny, who had previously written biographies of Joe Deasy, Sam Nolan and Tony Heffernan, published a biography of de Burca, Máirín De Burca: Activist, Feminist, Socialist. The book was broadly sympathetic, though it was not without criticism, including from Hilary Boyle, who once said de Burca was "an accessory after the fact" to the 1972 Aldershot bombing, in which the Provisional IRA's rejection of violence she had long opposed came, in critics' eyes, close to home; de Burca herself had firmly opposed the bombing campaign and the paramilitary violence of the period.

Richard McLaughlin, a Supreme Court judge who ruled against her in one case, nonetheless concluded his judgment by saying: "I admire Máirín de Búrca for her humanity and compassionate concern for the underprivileged, and admire her for her courage in sacrificing her liberty on their behalf".
