= Seán Ó Cionnaith =

Irish socialist republican politician (1938-2003)

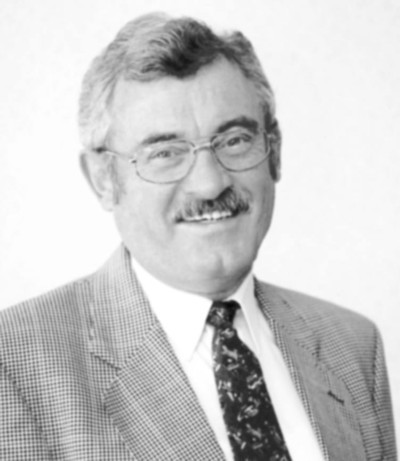

Dublin City Councillor
- In office 1999
- Constituency: Finglas

Personal details
- Born: 7 June 1938 Ballinasloe, County Galway, Ireland
- Died: 16 February 2003 (aged 64) Ballymun, Dublin, Ireland
- Party: Workers' Party (from 1969); Sinn Féin (mid-1950s–1969)

Military service
- Branch/service: Fianna Éireann (1950s)

Seán Ó Cionnaith (7 June 1938 – 16 February 2003 in Dublin) was an Irish socialist republican politician, and a prominent member of the Workers' Party.

He was born on 7 June 1937 in Creagh near Ballinasloe, County Galway, and was the second youngest of a family of five. His mother, Bridget, died when he was aged four and later stated that it had a profound and lasting effect on him. He left school at fourteen and got a job in a hardware store.

Ó Cionnaith joined the Irish republican movement as a teenager, and in the late 1950s he became a chief scout with Na Fianna Éireann, the movement's youth section. He moved to England in the late 1950s and worked as both a bus conductor in London and an organizer for Clann na hÉireann, before returning in the 1960s and basing himself in Dublin where he continued as a member of Sinn Féin.

Ó Cionnaith was a supporter of the efforts to move Sinn Féin into a more socialist position and was a close confidant of figures such as IRA Chief of Staff Cathal Goulding, along with Seán Garland and Tomás Mac Giolla. He strongly opposed the emergence of the Provisional Irish Republican Army, regarding its campaign as sectarian.

During the 1960s and early 1970s, Ó Cionnaith developed a number of campaigning organisations including the Dublin Housing Action Committee, the Gaeltacht Civil Rights Movement (Coiste Cearta Síbialta na Gaeilge), the Resources Protection Campaign and the campaign to end the control by private landlords over the fishing rights to Irish rivers and lakes.

He identified with the socialist cause and its internationalist outlook, and was involved in many solidarity campaigns with Cuba, North Korea, the Soviet Union, and the anti-apartheid movements in South Africa. In the mid-1970s he organised an Anti-Imperialist Festival in Ireland, featuring delegates from the Palestinian Liberation Organisation, the African National Congress, the MPLA, and others.

In the 1970s he became joint General Secretary of Official Sinn Féin (later renamed Sinn Féin the Workers' Party, and ultimately the Workers' Party) along with Máirín de Burca.

Ó Cionnaith served as Director of International Affairs of the Workers' Party for years, and was the party's representative in the United States and Canada during the early 1970s.

He remained with the Workers' Party after the split that led to the formation of Democratic Left.

Ó Cionnaith was co-opted on to Dublin City Council in 1999 for the Finglas constituency, however several months he lost it in the 1999 local elections. Most notable was his leading role in the campaign for the replacement of dangerous and unreliable lifts in the Ballymun high-rise complex, which saw the local community win a landmark court case against the local authority. He lost his council seat in 1999, and was unsuccessful when he stood in Dublin North-West at the 2002 general election.

On 15 February 2003, Ó Cionnaith joined over 100,000 Irish people who participated in a major march in Dublin against the impending US/UK-led invasion of Iraq. He died suddenly early the following morning at his home in Ballymun.
