= Hawkins House (Dublin) =

Office block in Dublin, Ireland

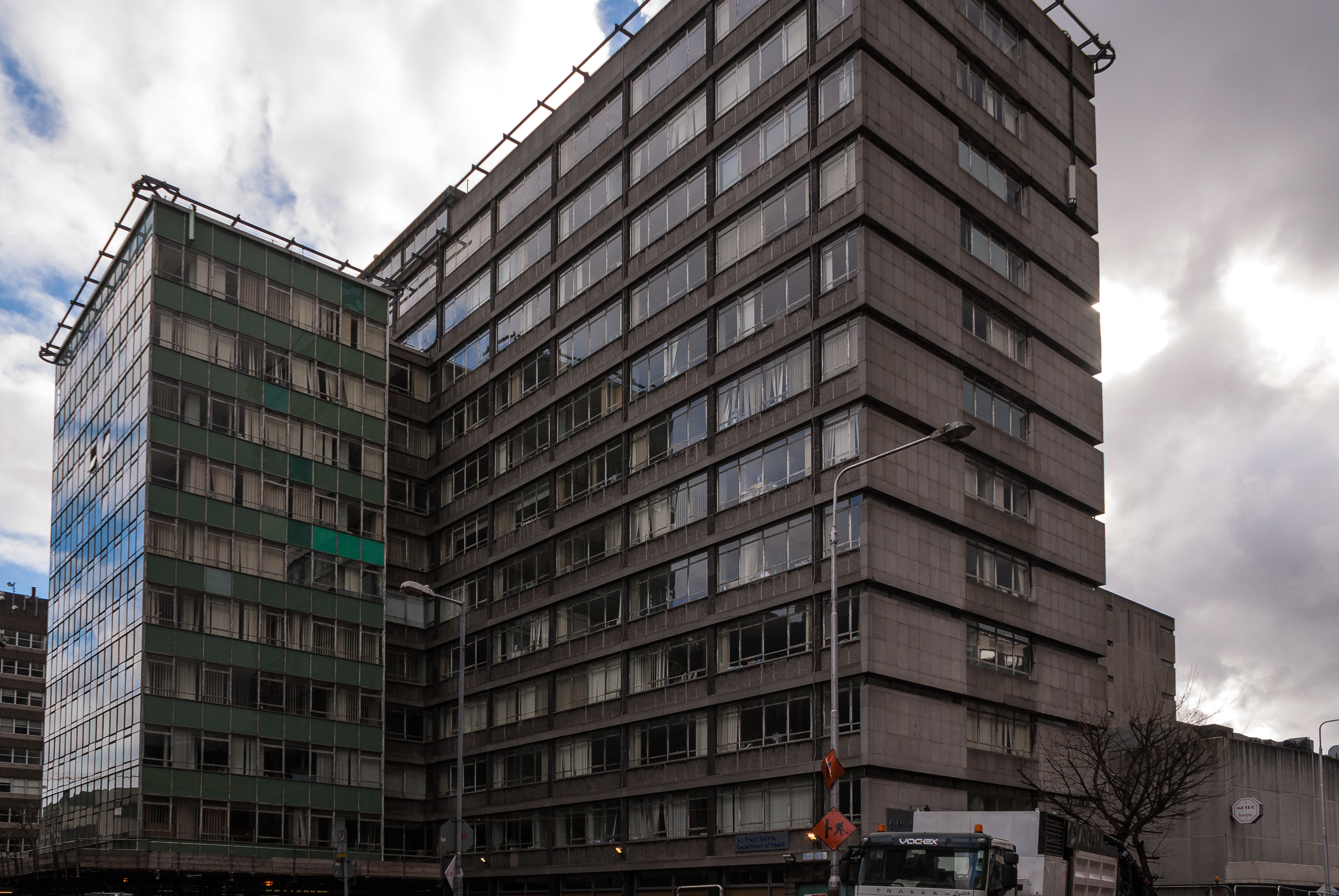
- Hawkins House in 2017

- Location within Central Dublin
- Etymology: Named after Hawkins Street

General information
- Location: Dublin, Ireland
- Coordinates: 53.3466°N 6.2559°W
- Completed: 1964
- Demolished: 2020–21

Height
- Height: 41.45m

Technical details
- Floor count: 12
- Floor area: 122,000 sq ft (11,300 m^{2})

Design and construction
- Architect: Sir Thomas Bennett

Hawkins House was a 12-storey office block in Dublin, Ireland. It was demolished in 2021.

== History ==
Hawkins House, with the Screen Cinema, was built on the site of the Theatre Royal which sat on the corner of Hawkins Street and Townsend Street. Hawkins House is on the corner of Poolbeg Street and Hawkins Street and was built between 1962 and 1964. It was the first of a set of buildings erected on this block, including Apollo House in 1969, the Screen Cinema and College House in 1972. The building was the former Department of Health headquarters.

Along with College House, Hawkins House was sold for £12 million in 1984.

== Architecture ==
The building was designed by English architect, Sir Thomas Bennett, and developed by the Rank Organisation. The 12-storey block had two curtain walls with two concrete slab facades. With O'Connell Bridge House, the impact of the height and bulk of Hawkins House led to the Dublin Corporation re-evaluating the guidelines around building height in the city.

== Demolition ==
The building was considered to be one of the ugliest in Dublin, being voted the worst building in Dublin in 1998. Permission was granted to demolish the block in 2017, with the demolition planned to take a year from 2020. It was the last of the modern structures on the block to be razed.

== See also ==
- Apollo House (Dublin)
- College Square
