= Dublin Housing Action Committee =

1960s protest group in Ireland

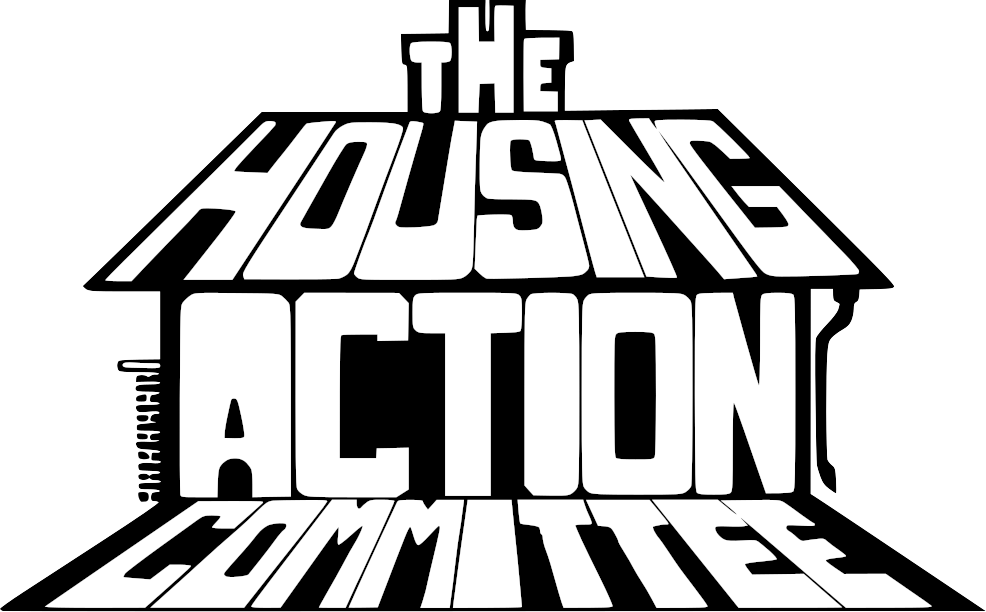
- Abbreviation: DHAC
- Formation: c. 1960s
- Dissolved: c. 1970
- Purpose: Housing activism

The Dublin Housing Action Committee (DHAC) was a 1960s protest group formed in response to housing shortages in Dublin, Ireland's capital city. It quickly moved to direct action and successfully squatted buildings to oppose redevelopment plans.

== Formation ==
The group arose in response to a serious shortage of affordable housing, in a time when a large number of properties standing empty. In some cases inner city tenements collapsed, leading to deaths. There were 18,000 individuals on Dublin Corporation's housing list, with activists claiming the real total was much higher. Further, unscrupulous landlords and speculators were plentiful. It also functioned as a way for a broad range of left-wing actors in the Republic of Ireland to address themselves to a wider audience. This came at a time when Northern Ireland was still relatively peaceful, just before the Troubles began.

The DHAC was set up by Sinn Féin in May 1967. At first it picketed Dublin Corporation meetings and organised demonstrations. It soon moved towards direct action, resisting evictions and occupying houses and buildings designated for demolition. The Squatter was a publication issued in 1969 by the group.

The committee was accused of being an 'IRA offshoot', but this seems unlikely. Although many Sinn Féin members were involved in the campaign, Sinn Féin and DHAC were two different groups.

== Mountjoy Square ==
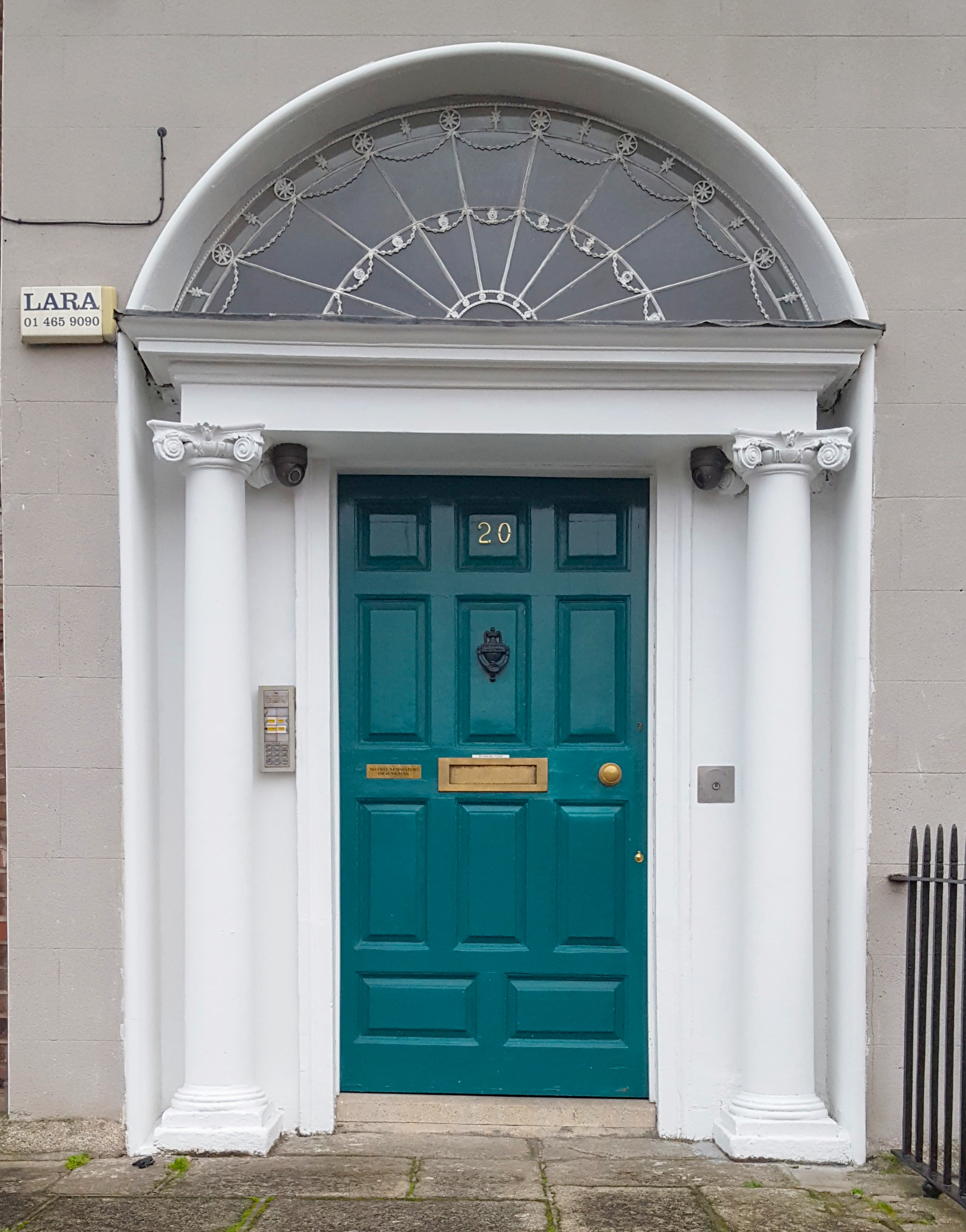
20 Mountjoy Square in 2020

The secretary of the committee was Dennis Dennehy (then a member of the Irish Communist Organisation). He squatted 20 Mountjoy Square and moved in with his wife and two children in November 1968. The house belonged to a businessman and had been left derelict. Dennehy was ordered to leave after a court case in December but refused, so he was then arrested for contempt of court and imprisoned on January 3.

Dennehy had wanted to get arrested, so as to generate publicity. He was supported by working class local residents because they did not want to be evicted from their homes so that offices could be built. He next went on hunger strike. In response, supporters marched every night from the General Post Office to Mountjoy prison during and 400 people blocked O’Connell Street Bridge on 20 January.

Eventually after a large demonstration with a march to the Lord Mayor's residence at Mansion House he was released from prison and went on to help support an extensive program of squatting in private-owner properties.

When the businessman later sold the Mountjoy Square houses he owned to a developer, his own house was daubed with slogans and his car was attacked with a home-made pipe-bomb.

== Later protests ==
Five members of the DHAC occupied the Four Courts in Dublin in September 1969. They painted a sign which said DHAC. We are occupying the Four Courts to demand the release of jailed homeless. It was a protest in support of Patrick Brady and Patrick Geraghty who had been imprisoned when they did not vacate their squat at the Carlton Hotel on Harcourt Street.

Denis Dennehy's position as secretary was then taken over by another homeless member, Eamonn O'Fearghail, who along with other families was squatting in private property on Pembroke Road, opposite the American Embassy. He remained in that location until the eviction of the families from the two houses some years later. This major Gardaí operation saw shields used by the force for the first time.

The Pembroke Road eviction and the employment of the Prohibition of Forcible Entry and Occupation Act (1971), signaled the end of the DHAC's campaign of housing homeless families in empty private houses. The act criminalised squatting and faced with increased repressions and the political challenges of the Troubles the group splintered.

== Members ==
Other prominent members were Sean MacStiofain (who would later join "Provisional" Sinn Féin after its 1970 split), Seán Ó Cionnaith, Proinsias De Rossa, and Eamonn McKenna (1936-2011) who would join the Official Sinn Féin faction, Michael O'Riordan, Máirín de Burca, Sam Nolan, Margaret Gaj, Bernard Brown (served as chairman) and Fr. Austin Flannery.

== Legacy ==
The DHAC called for a housing emergency to be declared, a prohibition on demolishing sound living accommodation, and an immediate halt to the building of prestige office block projects. The DHAC also inspired similar campaigns, such as the Derry Housing Action Committee, the Limerick Housing Action Committee (LHAC), and the Cork Housing Action Committee (CHAC). The latter organisation protested during a banquet held by the Taoiseach Jack Lynch, calling for Dennehy's release. The CHAC and the LHAC led a picket on Limerick Prison after several members of the CHAC were imprisoned for protesting; the picket was led by the LHAC's chairman, Liam Gleeson.

== See also ==
- Squatting in Ireland
