= Clann na hÉireann =

Support organisation for Irish emigrants in Britain

Clann na hÉireann was a support organisation among Irish emigrants in Great Britain which worked on behalf of Sinn Féin during the 1960s, and later for the Workers' Party in the 1970s and the 1980s.

== History ==
Consisting mainly of Irish emigrants, the Clann (as it was referred to by sympathisers) was set up in 1964 by the merger of Sinn Féin Birmingham branch and Sinn Féin London branch. Party President Tomás Mac Giolla came over and organised the merger with Seamus Collins from Birmingham who was the Clann Chairperson for most of its existence. Seán Ó Cionnaith became Clann organiser. Clann organized political meetings and protest marches and collected funds to support the movement's activities in Ireland. It was busiest in Birmingham and Glasgow, while their headquarters was in Fulham. It supported the Irish Republican Army (IRA), while the IRA recruited from the Clann's membership and maintained its own structure in Britain.

Clann established contact with Irish organisations in Britain and also with left-wing organisations such as the Connolly Association and the Communist Party of Great Britain. However, it kept a certain distance from these groups, as when it disassociated itself from leftists who became involved in a clash outside the Irish Embassy in London in April 1965.

Attempts were made in the mid-1960s to amalgamate Clann na hÉireann with the Connolly Association (which in turn shared some members with the Communist Party of Great Britain). However, despite the efforts of the Dublin leadership, this proposal was not accepted at the relevant Clann na hÉireann Ard Fheis.

After the split in the republican movement at the onset of the Troubles in 1969–1970, the leadership of Clann na hÉireann sided with Official Sinn Féin and the Official IRA.

The Clann published a monthly newspaper called Rosc Catha (Irish for "battle-cry"), starting in October 1972. They also organised CRAIC, a Birmingham Irish festival week which ran throughout the 1970s and 1980s. One of the CRAIC festivals included a reading by the Irish poet Seamus Heaney.

The BBC documentary, Birmingham Irish I am, which aired in February 2020, details part of the history and activities of Clann, and interviews two main members, Seamus Collins and Padraig Yeats.

== Prominent members ==
- Michael Gaughan from Mayo joined Clann na hÉireann in London before becoming an IRA volunteer in a London-based Active Service Unit. In December 1971, he was sentenced at the Old Bailey to seven years imprisonment for his part in an IRA fundraising mission to rob a bank in Hornsey, North London. He joined the Provisional IRA while in prison. He died in 1974 in Parkhurst Prison during a hunger-strike.
- Clann organiser Gerry Doherty and veteran Eamonn Smullen were arrested in a London police sting operation in 1969 while trying to purchase arms. Smullen spent the next five years in prison after which he took up a position at the Dublin Official Sinn Féin HQ.
- Brendan Phelan joined Clann Na hÉireann at the outbreak of the Troubles. Along with fellow Clann members Gerry Doherty and Danny Ryan he was deported under the Prevention of Terrorism Act in 1975 and settled back in Dublin.
- Senior Official IRA member Jim Flynn was arrested and placed in solitary confinement in the UK for eighteen days before being deported back to Ireland in 1975. He was allegedly responsible for the death of INLA leader Seamus Costello in 1977 and was shot dead by the INLA in 1982.
- Seamus Collins kept Clann active until the early 1990s. The creation of the Democratic Left party in 1992, had a devastating effect on the party, splitting the membership and support base.

== Publications ==
- The Littlejohn Memorandum (1975)
