= Michael Gaughan (Irish republican) =

Provisional IRA hunger striker (1949–1974)

- Born: 5 October 1949; Ballina, County Mayo, Ireland
- Died: 3 June 1974 (aged 24); Parkhurst Prison, Isle of Wight, England
- Cause of death: Hunger strike
- Organization: Provisional IRA
- Known for: Hunger strike of 64 days, from 31 March 1974
- Military career
- Allegiance: Provisional IRA
- Service years: c. 1969–1974
- Conflicts: The Troubles

Michael Gaughan (5 October 1949 – 3 June 1974) was a Provisional Irish Republican Army (IRA) hunger striker who died in 1974 in Parkhurst Prison on the Isle of Wight, England. Gaughan was one of 22 Irish republicans to die while on hunger strike in the 20th century.

== Background ==
Michael Gaughan, the eldest of six children, was born in Ballina, County Mayo in 1949. He grew up at Healy Terrace and was educated at St Muredach's College, Ballina. After finishing his schooling, he emigrated from Ireland to England in search of work.

While in London, Gaughan became a member of the Official Irish Republican Army (OIRA) through Official Sinn Féin's English wing, Clann na hÉireann (CNH), and joined a London-based Active Service Unit as an IRA volunteer. After the early 1970 split between the Provisional and Official IRA, many CNH members still considered the movement united; however, Gaughan joined the Provisional IRA while in England.

Gaughan was arrested on 21 May 1971, and in December 1971, he was sentenced at the Old Bailey to seven years imprisonment for his role in an IRA fundraising mission, which involved robbing a bank in Hornsey, north London. The robbery yielded £530 (equivalent to £6,700 in 2025), and he was also charged with the possession of two revolvers.

Initially, Gaughan was imprisoned at HM Prison Wormwood Scrubs, where he spent two years before being transferred to the top-security Albany Prison on the Isle of Wight. While at Albany, Gaughan requested political status, but this was refused, and he was placed in solitary confinement. He was later transferred to Parkhurst Prison.

On 31 March 1974, Gaughan, along with fellow Mayoman Frank Stagg, joined the ongoing hunger strike by future Sinn Féin Member of the Legislative Assembly Gerry Kelly, Paul Holme, Hugh Feeney, sisters Dolours and Marian Price, and others. They sought political status and transfer to a jail in Ireland.

The prisoners' primary demand was the right to political status—a de facto prisoner of war status—which would result in the following additional demands being met:

- The right to wear their own clothes
- A guarantee that they would not be returned to solitary confinement
- The right to access educational facilities and not engage in penal labour
- The setting of a reasonable date for transfer to an Irish prison

On 10 April 1974, Gaughan and Stagg were transferred to the prison hospital for observation, and force-feeding began two weeks later. Stagg would die during a later hunger strike on 12 February 1976 (aged 34).

== Force-feeding and death ==
British policy at this time was to force-feed hunger strikers to prevent their deaths. According to the National Hunger Strike Commemoration Committee, "six to eight guards would restrain the prisoner and drag him or her by the hair to the top of the bed, where they would stretch the prisoner's neck over the metal rail, force a block between his or her teeth and then pass a feeding tube, which extended down the throat, through a hole in the block." After visiting Gaughan in jail, his brother John described his condition: "His throat had been badly cut by force feeding and his teeth loosened. His eyes were sunken, his cheeks hollow and his mouth was gaping open. He weighed about six stone."

During his hunger strike, his weight dropped from 160 lb to 84 lb Gaughan was force-fed starting on 22 April, and this occurred 17 times during the course of his hunger strike. The last time he was force-fed was the night before his death on Sunday, 2 June. After a hunger strike that lasted 64 days, he died on Monday, 3 June 1974, at the age of 24.

Gaughan was one of 22 Irish republicans to die on hunger strike in the 20th century, which began with the 1917 death of the Irish revolutionary Thomas Ashe followed by the 1920 Cork hunger strike and the 1923 Irish hunger strikes. The cause of Gaughan's death was disputed. The British government stated that he died of pneumonia, while the Gaughan family asserted that he died after prison doctors fatally injured him when food lodged in a lung punctured by a force-feeding tube.

Gaughan's death caused controversy in English medical circles, as some forms of treatment can be classified as assault if administered without the express permission of the patient. The timing of his death came just one week after the British government capitulated to the demands of the loyalist Ulster Workers' Council strike. After Gaughan's death, the British government's policy of force-feeding ended, and the remaining hunger strikers were given assurances that they would be repatriated to Irish prisons. However, these promises were later reneged on by the British government.

== Funeral ==
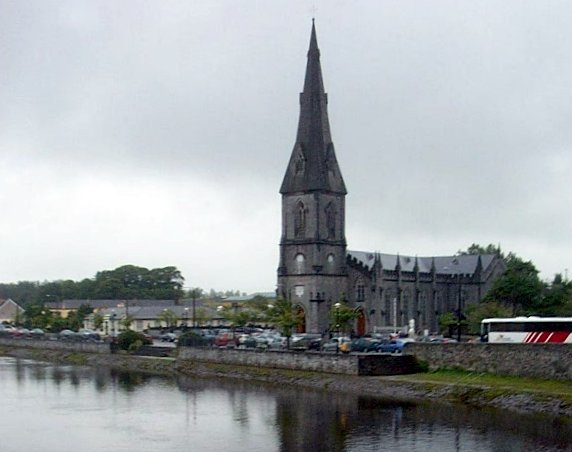
St. Muredach's Cathedral on the banks of the River Moy in Ballina

Gaughan's body was initially removed from London, and on Friday, 7 June, and Saturday, 8 June 1974, over 3,000 mourners lined the streets of Kilburn and marched behind his coffin, which was flanked by an IRA honor guard, to a Requiem Mass held in the Church of the Sacred Heart of Jesus.

On Saturday, his body was transported to Dublin, where it was again met by mourners and another IRA guard of honour, who brought it to the Adam and Eve's Franciscan church on Merchant's Quay, where thousands filed past as it lay in state. The following day, his body was removed to Ballina, County Mayo. The funeral mass took place on 9 June at St. Muredach's Cathedral, and the procession then led to Leigue Cemetery. Gaughan was given a full IRA funeral and was laid to rest in the republican plot, where Frank Stagg would join him after being reburied in November 1976. His funeral was attended by over 50,000 people and was larger than the funeral of former president Éamon de Valera the following year.

Ballina republican Jackie Clarke presided at the last obsequies, and the oration at his graveside was given by Dáithí Ó Conaill, who stated that Gaughan had "been tortured in prison by the vampires of a discredited empire who were joined by decrepit politicians who were a disgrace to the name of Irishmen."

His coffin was draped in the same Tricolour that was used for Terence McSwiney's funeral 54 years earlier. It would later be used for the funeral of James McDade, an IRA member killed in a premature explosion in Coventry.

The funeral embarrassed the anti-republican Fine Gael/Labour coalition government in Dublin at the time, and its Taoiseach, Liam Cosgrave. Paddy Cooney, Minister for Justice at the time, claimed that the IRA intimidated businesses in the towns that the funeral procession passed through, forcing them to close.

== Final message and commemoration ==
Michael Gaughan left a final message:

I die proudly for my country and in the hope that my death will be sufficient to obtain the demands of my comrades. Let there be no bitterness on my behalf, but a determination to achieve the New Ireland for which I gladly die. My loyalty and confidence is to the IRA and let those of you who are left carry on the work and finish the fight.

His death is referenced in the song "Take Me Home to Mayo," also known as "The Ballad of Michael Gaughan," composed by Seamus Robinson and performed and recorded by many Irish musicians, including Christy Moore, the Wolfe Tones, Wolfhound, Derek Warfield, The Irish Brigade and the Dublin City Ramblers.

My name is Michael Gaughan From Ballina I came

I saw my people sufferin' and swore to break their chains

I took the boat to England prepared to fight or die

Far away from Mayo beneath an English sky

My body's cold and hungry in Parkhurst Jail I lie

for the loving of my country on hunger strike I'll die

I have but one last longing I pray you'll not deny

bury me in Mayo beneath my Irish sky

Take me home to Mayo across the Irish Sea

Home again in Mayo where once I roamed so free

Take me home to Mayo and let my body lie

Home at last in Mayo

beneath an Irish sky

— Seamus Robinson

There are annual lectures and commemorations in honour of Gaughan, Stagg (who survived in 1974 but died during a 1976 hunger strike), and Sean McNeela (a Ballycroy, County Mayo IRA man who died on hunger strike in Dublin in 1940) at the republican plot in Ballina, organized by both Republican Sinn Féin and Sinn Féin. This includes a march from the Humbert monument in Ballina to Leigue Cemetery. The Republican Sinn Féin cumann in Mayo is named the McNeela-Gaughan-Stagg Cumann.

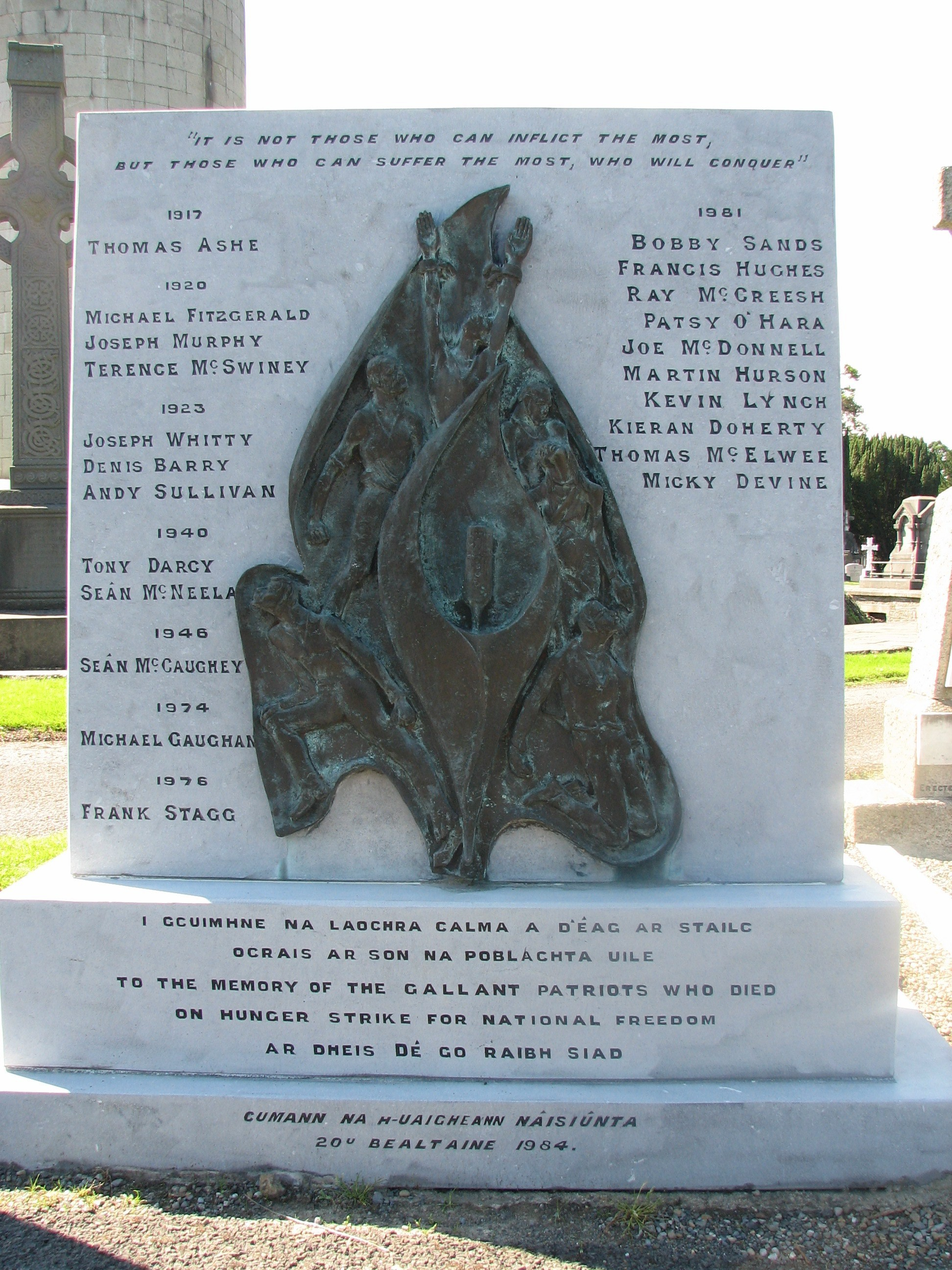
Hunger Strike Memorial in Dublin's Glasnevin Cemetery

On 12 February 2006, a mural dedicated to Stagg and Gaughan was unveiled on the Falls Road in Belfast. In August 2020, a mural was erected in his memory in the lane behind his home at Healy Terrace.
