= Brendan Phelan =

Irish songwriter from Dublin (born 1946)

Brendan Phelan (born 1946) is an Irish songwriter from Dublin. His best-known song is probably "Dublin in My Tears", recorded by the Barleycorn, The Fureys, Patsy Watchorn, the Dublin City Ramblers, Mick Galvin, the Jolly Beggarmen and others.

Phelan was born in Dublin. His father, Michael, was a barber, and his mother, Carmel Kelly, was a tailor. However, he was brought up in his grandmother's house in the suburb of Drimnagh. He was educated at Ard Scoil Éanna in Crumlin. In 1959 began one of several sojourns in Slough, England, where his father was living and attended St. Joseph's Catholic High School whilst there. He travelled back and forth between the two cities over the following few years.

He eloped and married in Bristol on St. Valentine's Day, 1966 and settled there and about this period started writing songs. After the outbreak of the Troubles in Northern Ireland, he joined Clann na hÉireann, the British wing of Official Sinn Féin. He was deported under the Prevention of Terrorism Act in 1975 and settled back in Dublin. He has been active in politics there on behalf of the Workers' Party.

Several of Phelan's songs, such as "Seven Sober Nights", "The Equalizer", "Easter Lily" and "Four Sons" have been recorded by the Beer Mats. "Paddy's Walk to China" has been recorded by Tim Dennehy on A Thimbleful of Song. One of his songs, "Cavan Always Follows Me Around", sung by Jerry Crilly, won the Cavan International Song Contest in the early 1990s. The first of his songs to be recorded was 'Paddy On The Screeve' by Na Seanchai, in 1979. Was once described by Dominic Behan as, "Potentially, the finest songwriter Ireland has ever produced".

In March 2015 he released his first album Bristol In My Tears, on the Repofire label. This double album featured songs written by him over a period of five decades and covered almost every field of music possible: Folk. American Country, Sixties Pop, Traditional Irish style, Blues, semi-classical, etc.

Soon after the launch of the album in Dublin, he suffered a mild stroke followed by a bout of pneumonia and this seriously hampered the initial promotion of his album, forcing him to cancel or postpone many radio interviews in Ireland and abroad, including Bristol and Slough, towns which were featured prominently in the lyrics and stories relating to the album. It is hoped that Brendan will be in a position to re-launch the album in the Spring of 2016.

He is currently writing a childhood memoir.

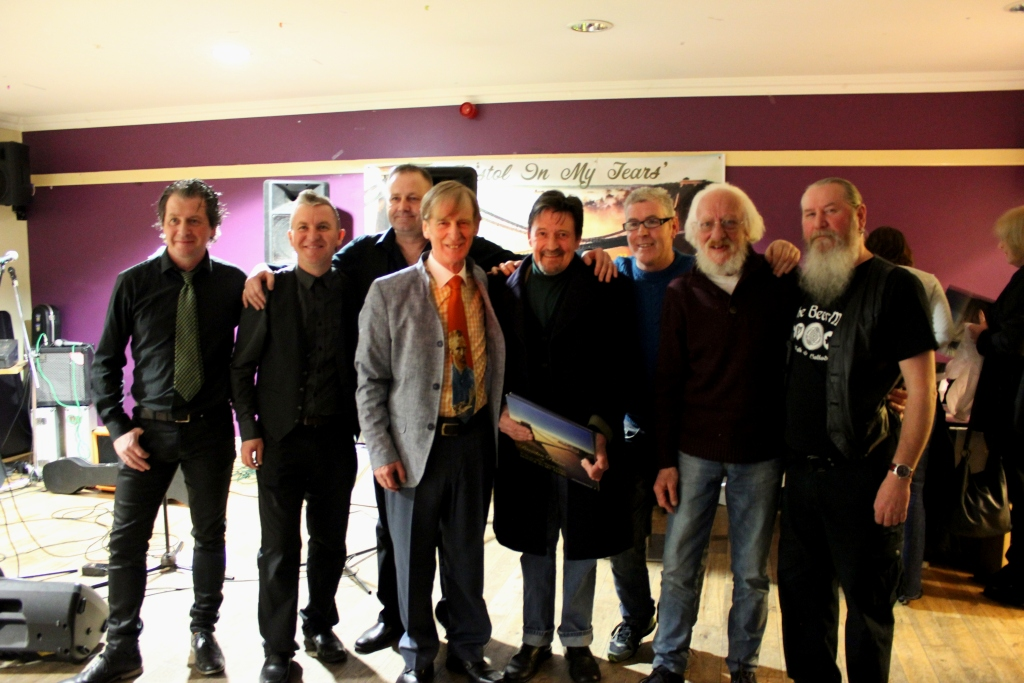
Album launch 6/3/2015
