= Dennis Dennehy =

Irish political activist

Dennis Dennehy (1938–1984) was an Irish political activist. He was a founding member of both the Irish Communist Organisation and the Dublin Housing Action Committee.

== Life ==
Dennis Dennehy was born in Ireland in 1938 and was a native of Bushmount, Ballyduff, County Kerry. He emigrated to London, and became active in CND and amongst Communist groups there with other Irish emigrants. Following the 1965 split in the Communist group, he sided with the Maoist wing which became the Irish Communist Organisation (later the British & Irish Communist Organisation). Returning to Ireland in the mid sixties he served as secretary of the Dublin Housing Action Committee, and was arrested for squatting at 20 Mountjoy Square. During his time in prison he went on hunger strike in January 1969. He then worked as driver in Dublin Bus (CIÉ) and was member of the ITGWU.

In his final years he was a founder member of DAD and the Family Law Reform Group.

== Death ==
Dennehy died after an illness on 14 June 1984 and is buried in Glasnevin cemetery.
