= Seomra Spraoi =

Former self-managed social centre in Dublin

Coordinates: 53°21′28″N 6°15′29″W

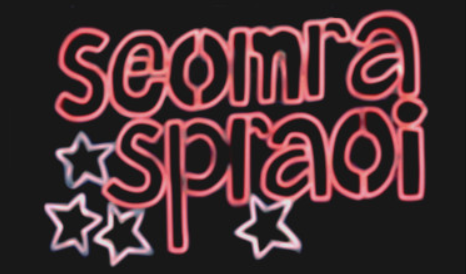

General information
- Classification: Self-managed social centre
- Location: 10 Belvedere Court, Dublin 1, Dublin, Ireland
- Opened: 2004
- Closed: 2015

Technical details
- Floor count: 2

Website
- seomraspraoi.org

Seomra Spraoi (English: Play Room) was a self-managed social centre in Dublin, Ireland which first opened in 2004 and closed in 2015. It was run on a not-for-profit basis by an anti-capitalist collective with anarchist principles.

== Location ==
Seomra Spraoi was first located at Ormond Quay, then Mary's Abbey, then at 10 Belvedere Court, behind Mountjoy Square. It first opened in 2004 and closed in 2015.

== Events ==
Located at Belvedere Court, the building had two floors and a garden. There was a kitchen, a cinema, a computer, a library, a free shop and meeting spaces. Seomra Spraoi hosted a number of regular events such as a vegan cafe, bicycle repair workshop, gigs, free cinema and art exhibitions. Fundraisers were held for groups such as Refugee and Migrant Solidarity Ireland, and Students for Justice in Palestine (SJP). Queer Thing organised at the space and Auntie Underground Cinema screened anarchist films fortnightly.

Other events included anti-authoritarian parent and child groups, anarcha-feminist meetings and a table-tennis club. From 2005 onwards, Seomra Spraoi hosted the Forgotten Zine archive, created in 2004 by Ciarán Walsh. It contained around 1,200 zines from both Irish and foreign authors. The archive was open access and volunteers catalogued the zines on LibraryThing into four broad categories namely: Artistic & Creative; Music; Political and Social; Resources.

The project hosted a public talk by Philip Nitschke, founder and director of the pro-euthanasia group Exit International in 2010. In February 2011, Seomra Spraoi provided a venue for Nitschke again, after several other venues cancelled on short notice due to pressure from right-wing Christian groups. Also in 2011, a series of planning meetings took place for what would become Occupy Dame Street. During a 2014 International Squatters Convergence, there were entertainments at Seomra Spraoi.

== Closure ==
Seomra Spraoi was forced to shut after a Garda Síochána (police) raid which was followed by a visit from the Dublin Fire Brigade. Afterwards, some former participants developed it into a gig venue under the name Jigsaw, which closed in April 2021.

The building was demolished in December 2022.

== See also ==
- Squatting in Ireland
