= John Creaghe =

Irish anarchist (1841–1920)

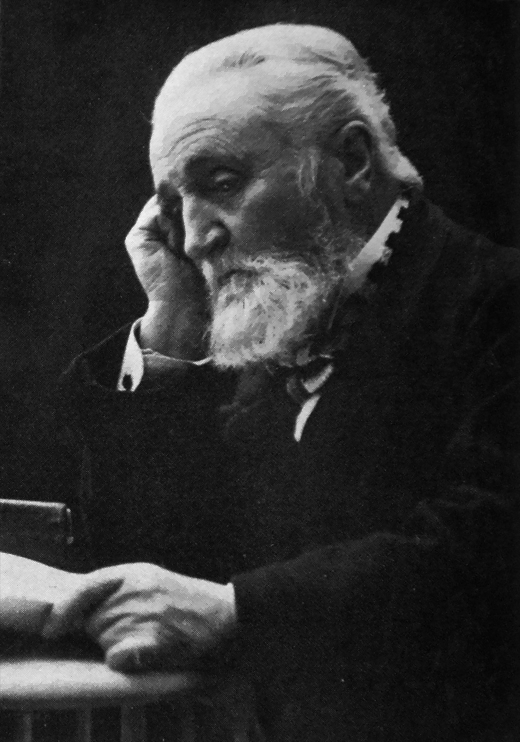
- Born: 1841; County Limerick, Ireland
- Died: 10 February 1920 (aged 78–79); Washington, DC, United States of America
- Other name: Juan Creaghe
- Education: Royal College of Surgeons
- Occupations: Doctor, Educator

John O’Dwyer Creaghe (1841 – 19 February 1920), also known as Juan Creaghe, was an Irish-born anarchist.

== Background ==
Creaghe was born in Limerick, Ireland in 1841, and in 1865 he graduated from the Royal College of Surgeons in Dublin, becoming a doctor. He opened up a practice in Mitchelstown in County Cork. In 1874, he emigrated to the capital of Argentina, Buenos Aires.

== In Argentina ==
It is not known how Creaghe came in contact with anarchist ideas, since the country's anarchist movement was small at the time. It's speculated he may have come into contact with the Italian Anarchist Errico Malatesta, who was in Argentina between 1885 and 1889.

== In England ==
In 1890, he moved to Sheffield, England, working in a poor working class district with many Irish immigrants. He became involved in the Socialist League, a Marxist group led by William Morris, but he soon broke away to form an anarchist group in Sheffield. On the group's first public appearance, it sported a banner reading "No God, No Master" at the May Day demonstration. The group soon also founded a club and a newspaper, the Sheffield Anarchist, which did not survive for long as it became caught up in the Walsall Anarchists' trial.

In 1891 Creaghe wrote "give me Anarchists willing to die NOW if necessary for Anarchy, and if you can find me 15 or 20 to join me I promise you we will make an oppression of the enemy"

== Return to the Americas ==
In 1892, he left Sheffield to go back to Argentina via Liverpool, London, and Spain. There he founded the newspaper El Oprimido, forerunner of La Protesta, which exists to this day. He was involved in the founding of the Argentine Regional Workers' Federation, an anarchist trade union. He also contributed to the Ferrer free school movement inspired by the ideas of the Spanish anarchist pedagogue Francisco Ferrer, and director of the Rationalist School in Luján, Buenos Aires. In 1911, Creaghe left Argentina once again, eventually arriving in Los Angeles, where he collaborated with Mexican anarchists. He founded another newspaper, La Regeneración, and was friends with Ricardo Flores Magón. Both were involved in the Magonista rebellion of 1911 in Baja California; after the start of the Mexican Revolution, they supported the country's anarchist movement. Creaghe died on 19 February 1920, in a prison in Washington, DC.
