= Apollo House (Dublin) =

Former office block in Dublin, Ireland

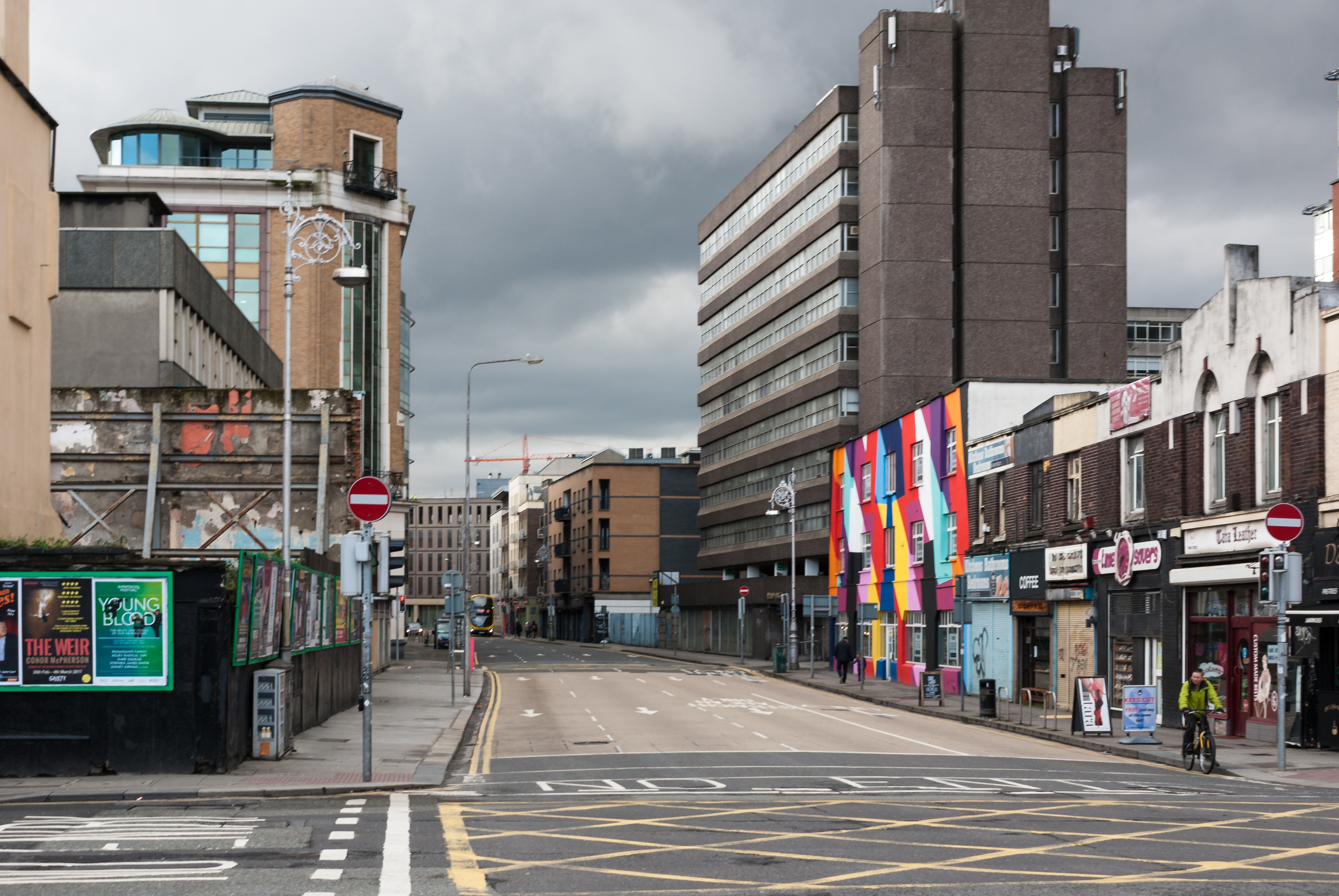
- Southerly view towards Apollo House from Butt Bridge, 2017

- Location within Central Dublin

General information
- Location: Dublin, Ireland
- Coordinates: 53.3465344°N 6.2578604°W
- Completed: 1969
- Demolished: 2018

Technical details
- Floor count: 9

Apollo House was a 9-storey office block in Tara Street, Dublin, Ireland.

== History ==
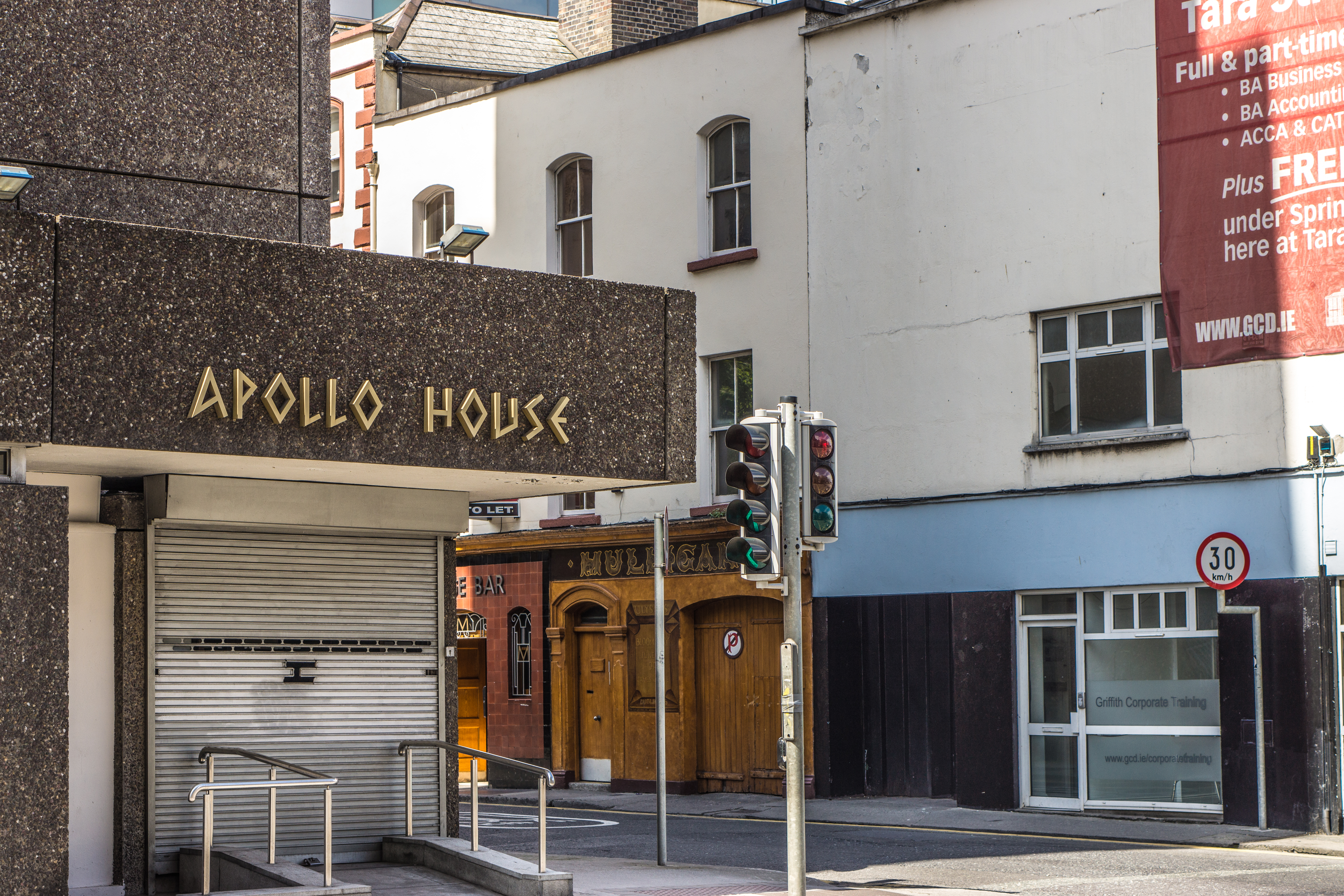
Apollo House entrance and signage

Apollo House was built in 1969 for the Norwich Union Group by Block Office and Shop Investments. 7 older buildings were demolished to make way for the 9-storey office block with street level retail, a car park, and a petrol station. It was constructed with pre-cast concrete blocks, and designed by David Keane, who also designed Phibsboro Shopping Centre.

== Occupation ==
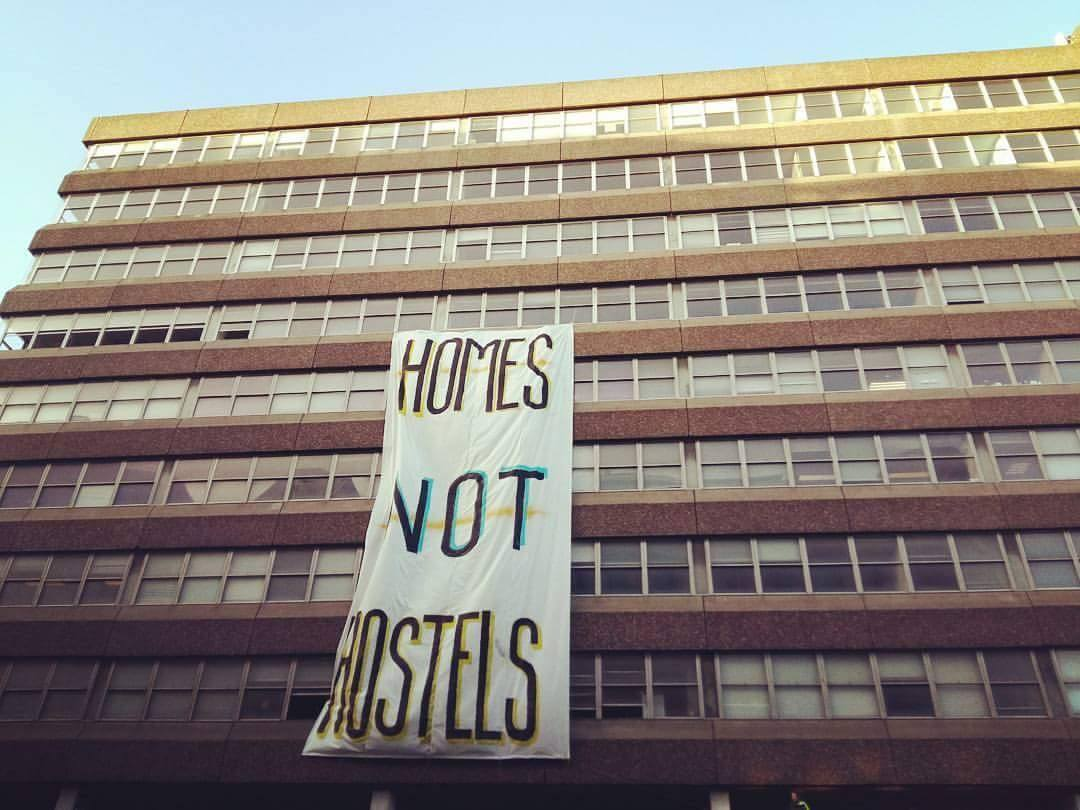
Apollo House occupation

The empty office block was occupied by 40 homeless people for 27 days from 15 December to 12 January 2017, supported by the Irish Housing Network under the campaign entitled "Home Sweet Home". Over the course of the occupation, 205 homeless people were housed in the block. Among the supporters of the occupation were Glen Hansard, Christy Dignam, Jim Sheridan, Kodaline, and Hozier.

== Demolition and redevelopment ==
Apollo House was demolished in June 2018. The remains of a large stone building were discovered on the site which are thought to be the chapel which was known to have existed in this area.

The site was purchased by developer Pat Crean's Marlet Property Group for an estimated €56 million from the National Asset Management Agency. Permission was granted for a mixed development on the site, alongside the adjoining College House and Screen Cinema, under the new name College Square. This was despite objections from An Taisce about the impact of a new development that is proposed to be taller than the previous Apollo House.

== Gallery ==
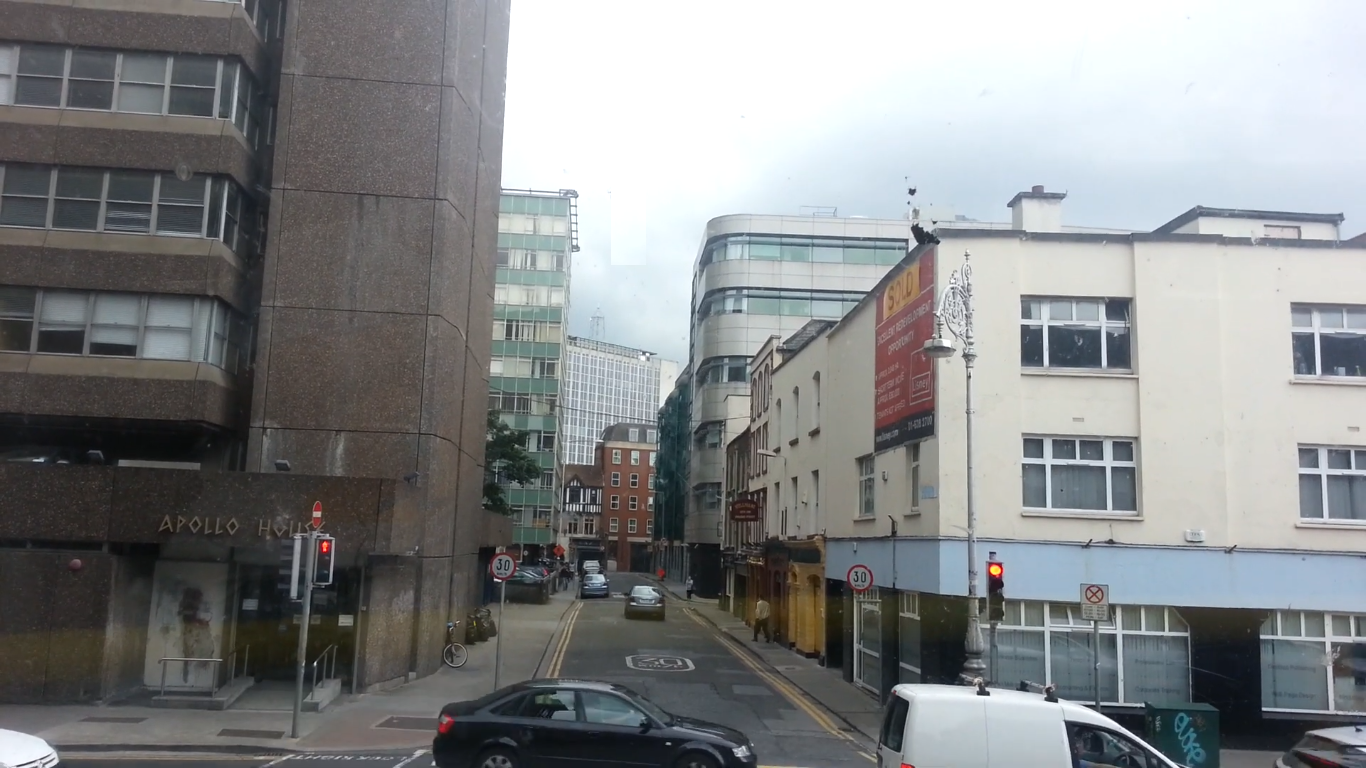
Westward view down Poolbeg Street in 2015

== See also ==
- Hawkins House (Dublin)
- Mulligan's (est.1854), a notable nearby pub
- Screen Cinema
