= List of Old Rockmen =

List of notable past pupils of Blackrock College, County Dublin, Ireland

This is a list of notable past pupils of Blackrock College (Irish: Coláiste na Carraige Duibhe), a Catholic, voluntary secondary school for boys aged 14–18, in Williamstown, Blackrock, County Dublin, Ireland. The college was founded by French missionaries in 1860, to act as a school and civil service training centre. Set in 0.25 square kilometres (62 acres) of grounds, it has an illustrious sporting tradition. The college, 7 kilometres (4.3 mi) from Dublin city centre is just in from the sea, and is self-contained, with a large boarding school and teaching facilities. Now run by a lay foundation in trust, it maintains high academic standards and requires all pupils to participate in non-academic activities. The missionary tradition continues with charity programmes, especially at Christmas. It accommodates approximately 1,100 day (primarily) and boarding students.

== Literature ==
- Brian O'Nolan, wrote the novels At Swim-Two-Birds (1939) and The Third Policeman (1967) under the pen name Flann O'Brien. A career civil servant, he also wrote satirical columns in The Irish Times under the pseudonym Myles na gCopaleen.
- Pádraic Ó Conaire (28 February 1882 – 6 October 1928) was a writer and journalist who wrote in Irish, particularly about Irish emigrants in the UK.
- Joseph O'Connor, Author
- Liam O'Flaherty (28 August 1896 – 7 September 1984) was a novelist and short story writer, known for The Informer, he was a major figure in the Irish Renaissance.
- Tim Pat Coogan is an Irish historian and journalist. He attended Blackrock in the late 1940s.
- Paul Murray, (b. 1975) a novelist, author of Skippy Dies

== Journalism ==
- Paddy Murray, a journalist, who served as Editor of the Sunday Tribune from 2002 to 2005.
- Rory Carroll, a foreign reporter for The Guardian, he gained international attention when he was kidnapped in Baghdad in 2005. He was released unharmed.
- David McWilliams, an economics journalist and broadcaster.
- Paul Tansey, was the Economics Editor of The Irish Times; he also founded a business consultancy.

== Business ==
- David J. O'Reilly, chairman and CEO of Chevron Corporation.
- Lochlann Quinn, former chairman of AIB, co-founder of Glendimplex Group
- Dr. Brendan O'Regan CBE, visionary businessman responsible for transforming Shannon Airport and the Shannon Region and deeply involved in the peace and cooperation process in Ireland
- Eddie O'Connor, founder and CEO of Airtricity and Mainstream Renewable Power
- Derek Quinlan, real estate investor
- Stephen Wall, Blackrock Advocacy Services

== Politics and government ==
- Éamon de Valera was one of the leaders of the Irish War of Independence, after which he served as Taoiseach of Ireland six times, introduced the 1937 Constitution of Ireland, and served two terms as Uachtarán na hÉireann. He was a pupil and later Professor of Mathematics at Blackrock.
- Ruairi Quinn, TD, was Minister for Education and Skills in the Government of Ireland. He served as the Minister for Finance from 1994 to 1997, and leader of the Labour Party from 1997 to 2002. He was a pupil at Blackrock in the early 1960s, where he was successful in rugby, athletics and art.
- Barry Andrews, a teacher, served as TD for Dún Laoghaire from 2002 until 2011. He was the Minister for Children from 2008 until 2011.
- Rory O'Hanlon was a TD for Cavan–Monaghan from 1977 until 2011. He served in a range of cabinet positions and as Ceann Comhairle of Dáil Éireann.
- Niall Ó Brolcháin was the mayor of Galway from 2006 to 2007. He has also served as a county councillor and senator.
- James McNeill, was an Irish politician and diplomat, who served as the first high commissioner to London and second governor-general of the Irish Free State from 1927 to 1932.
- Art O'Connor, elected Sinn Féin MP for Kildare South in 1918, he joined the revolutionary parliament of Dáil Éireann. In the 2nd Dáil he served as secretary for agriculture from 1921 to 1922.
- Eoin Ó Broin, Sinn Féin TD for Dublin Mid-West and spokesperson on housing, local government and heritage.
- David P. Doyle, ambassador, St. Kitts and Nevis to UNESCO

== Legal ==
- Ronan Keane, former chief justice of the Supreme Court of Ireland
- Dermot Gleeson, former attorney general, current chairman of AIB
- Michael Moriarty, High Court judge
- John Quirke, High Court judge
- David Barniville, High Court judge
- Seamus Egan, former justice of the Supreme Court of Ireland
- Vivion de Valera, son of Éamon de Valera, he served in the Army during The Emergency, then as a T.D.
- Rossa Fanning, attorney general

== Humanitarian ==
- Frank Duff, Founder of the Legion of Mary
- Niall O'Brien, Missionary

== Academic ==
- E. J. Conway, biochemist, specialist in electrolyte physiology and analytical chemistry.
- James Macmahon
- Bryan Patrick Beirne
- Alfred O'Rahilly

== Arts ==
- Paul Costelloe
- Fergus Martin
- Michael McGlynn
- Ronan Murray
- Pauric Sweeney, Fashion Designer
- Robert Ballagh
- Eden (Irish musician)

== Clergy ==
- Emil August Allgeyer C.S.Sp., French born priest, first ordination in Blackrock in 1900, served in Trinidad and as a Bishop in Africa.
- John Cardinal D'Alton
- Eugene Joseph Butler C.S.Sp., Bishop of Zanzibar, and Bishop of Mombasa
- Robert Ellison B.Sc., S.T.L., C.S.Sp., Bishop of Banjui, Gambia.
- John Gerald Neville DD, C.S.Sp. 1858–1943, purchased Clareville for Blackrock, Bishop of Zanzibar, and Kenya, ordained a bishop in Blackrock in 1913.
- Ambrose Kelly C.S.Sp., Bishop of Freetown and Bo, Sierre Leone
- Daniel Liston BA, BCL, DD, C.S.Sp., Bishop of Port Louis in Mauritius (1947–1968).
- John Joseph McCarthy C.S.Sp., Bishop of Nairobi, Kenya.
- John Charles McQuaid (Archbishop of Dublin)
- Michael Joseph Moloney C.B.E., C.S.Sp.,(1912–1991) Bishop of Banjui, Gambia. Leinster Schools Rugby Cup winning Captain in 1928 and 1929.
- Donal Murray, Bishop of Limerick
- John Joseph O'Gorman, C.S.Sp., first Bishop from the Irish Holy Ghost Fathers, first Bishop of Sierra Leone.
- John C. O'Riordan, C.S.Sp., Bishop of the Roman Catholic Diocese of Kenema in Sierra Leone.
- Joseph Brendan Whelan, BA, S.T.L, C.S.Sp.(1909–1990), served as Bishop of Owerri in Nigeria

== Sport ==
=== Rugby ===
- Niall Brophy (Leinster, Ireland and British & Irish Lions) One of the great Irish international rugby players of the 1950s and '60s
- Denis Buckley (Connacht and Ireland U20)
- Shane Byrne (Leinster, Ireland and British & Irish Lions)
- John Cantrell (Leinster and Ireland)John Cantrell
- Joey Carbery (Leinster and Ireland)
- Fionn Carr (Leinster, Connacht and Ireland 7s)
- Thomas Clarkson (Leinster, Ireland and British & Irish Lions)
- Andrew Conway (Leinster, Munster and Ireland)
- Victor Costello (Leinster and Ireland rugby player and Olympic shot-putter)
- Leo Cullen (Leinster and Ireland)
- Luke Fitzgerald (Leinster, Ireland and British & Irish Lions)
- Neil Francis (Leinster and Ireland)
- Jason Harris-Wright (Leinster, Connacht and Ireland U20)
- Oli Jager (Crusaders, Munster and Ireland)
- Hugo Keenan (Leinster, Ireland and British & Irish Lions)
- Brendan Macken (Leinster, Wasps and Ireland U20)
- Hugo MacNeill (Leinster, Ireland and British & Irish Lions)
- Ian Madigan (Leinster and Ireland)
- Niall Morris (Leinster, Leicester Tigers and Ireland U20)
- Brendan Mullin (Leinster, Ireland and British & Irish Lions) Irish rugby international of the 1980s and '90s, and one of the country's greatest ever players
- Gavin Mullin (Leinster and Ireland 7s)
- Jordi Murphy (Leinster and Ireland)
- Ryle Nugent, RTÉ Rugby Commentator
- Tommy O'Brien (Leinster and Ireland)
- Brian O'Driscoll (Leinster, Ireland and British & Irish Lions) was, since 2004, the captain of the Ireland national rugby union team. He attended Blackrock college from 1992 to 1998, where he first played rugby.
- Conor Oliver (Munster, Connacht and Ireland U20)
- Paddy Patterson (Leinster, Munster and Ireland U20)
- David Quinlan (Leinster and Ireland)
- John Quirke (Ireland) 1962–1968, capped whilst still at Blackrock College
- Garry Ringrose, (Leinster, Ireland and British & Irish Lions)
- Peter Robb (Connacht and Ireland U20)
- Mark Roche (Ireland 7s)
- Alain Rolland (Leinster and Ireland rugby player and international rugby referee)
- Fergus Slattery (UCD, Ireland and British & Irish Lions) 1970s rugby player, part of famous 1974 Lions Tour
- Nick Timoney (Ulster and Ireland)
- Liam Turner (Leinster and Ireland 7s)
- Cillian Willis (Leinster)

=== Other Sports ===
- Nicolas Roche (professional cyclist)
- Mark Vaughan (Dublin Gaelic Footballer)
- Cian O'Sullivan (Dublin Gaelic Footballer)
- Michael Darragh MacAuley (Dublin Gaelic Footballer)
- Michael Cusack, Founder of the Gaelic Athletic Association taught at the school
- Paul Dunne (golfer)
- Joey O'Meara (cricket and hockey) Cricket and Hockey international
- Alan Lee (Irish international association football player)
- David Pigot Jr. (first-class cricketer)

== Entertainment ==
- Des Bishop, Comedian
- Craig Doyle, television presenter
- Dave Fanning, DJ, broadcaster
- Bob Geldof, musician, lead singer with The Boomtown Rats. Organiser of Live Aid concerts
- Frank Kelly, actor
- David McSavage, comedian
- Ardal O'Hanlon, comic actor
- Ryan Tubridy, broadcaster
- Conal Gallen, playwright, comedian, singer-songwriter
- Jonathon Ng, singer songwriter, known as EDEN

== See also ==
- Category:People educated at Blackrock College
