= Senatus of Uganda =

Legion of Mary highest governing Council in Uganda

Legion of Mary in Uganda
- Eggye lya Bikiira Maria
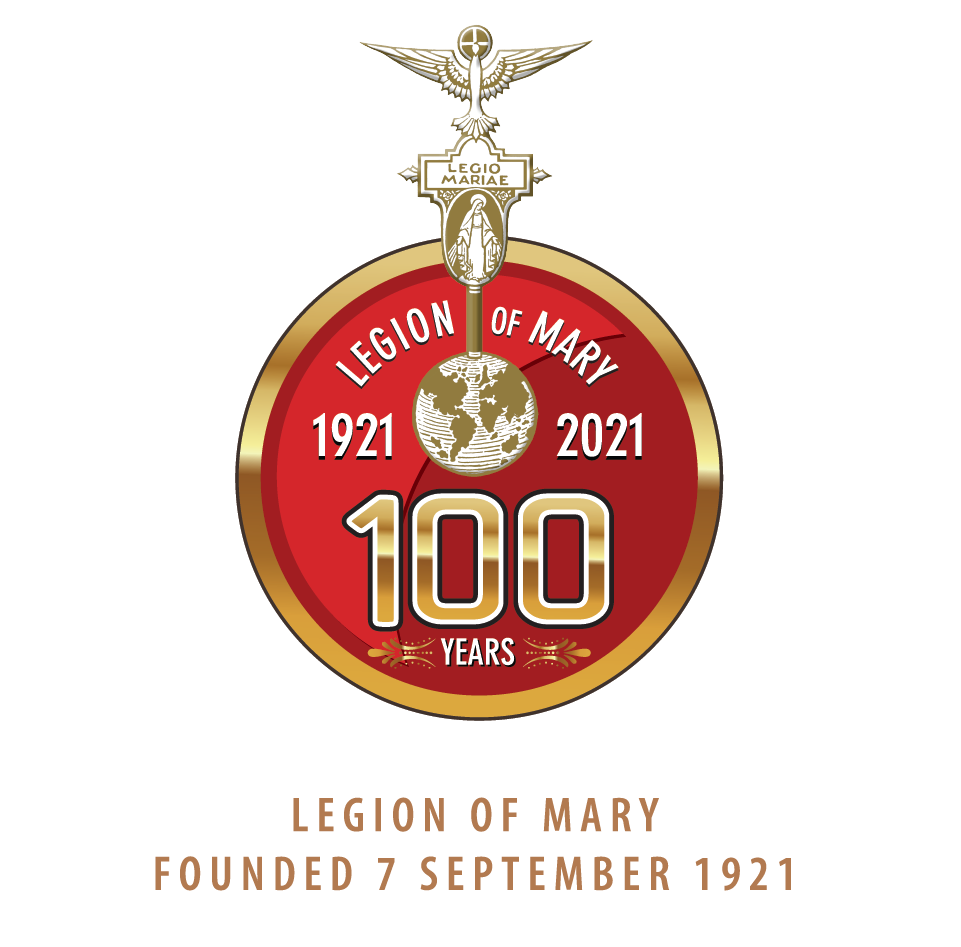
- Legion of Mary Centenary Logo
- Formation: 24 September 1938; 87 years ago
- Founder: Servant of God Frank Duff
- Type: Catholic lay society Marian devotional society
- Headquarters: St. Balikuddembe, Mengo-Kisenyi Parish, Roman Catholic Archdiocese of Kampala
- Members: Approx. 400,000 (2020)
- Official language: English
- Website: senatusofuganda.org

The Senatus of Uganda is the highest governing Council of Legion of Mary (Latin: Legio Mariae, postnominal abbreviation L.O.M.) in Uganda that reports to Concilium Legionis Mariae. Legion of Mary is a voluntary organisation whose membership are members of the Roman Catholic Church at the service of Our Lady, the Blessed Virgin Mary.

== History ==
Legion of Mary started on 7 September 1921. It mainly operated in Dublin Diocese due to mistrust developed because of its then-unusual dedication to lay apostolate until 1931 when Pope Pius XI praised the movement. Venerable Edel Quinn volunteered as an envoy of Legion of Mary to East and Central Africa. She set sail for Africa from Tilbury in London (where she had been for extension work) on 30 October 1936. She arrived in Uganda on 22 July 1938.

On arrival, Edel Quinn met the then Henri Streicher, Vicar Apostolic of Northern Victoria Nyanza who accepted her to establish the Legion of Mary. She travelled to the mother house of the congregation of the Franciscan Sisters of Africa in Nkokonjeru in the current Lugazi Diocese where she established the first Praesidium in Uganda at Nkonkojeru PTC on 24 September 1938. The presidium was called "Our Lady of Mercy" because 24 September was the Feast of Our Lady of Mercy.

It should be remembered that 1939 was the beginning of World War II and it had an effect on consideration in English colonial countries and others like Tanganyika that had strong German connections. Edel continued her work regardless of the fuel rations among others.

She also visited other places in Kachumbala (Eastern Uganda), Christ the King Parish, Mulago, Nabbingo among others.

== Growth ==
The Praesidia started by Venerable Edel Quinn and some of the members she trained spread the Legion of Mary to different other places and started up Curia that later grew between 1956 and 1957 to Comitium that was established in Kampala. Uganda was under the Kampala Comitium until 20 May 1962 when Kampala was granted Senatus from Senatus of East Africa by Concilium. The inauguration was attended by among others Archbishop Joseph Kiwánuka. Prof. Dr. Raphael Owor was the first President of both the Comitium and the Senatus of Uganda. He was succeeded by Prof Charles Olweny as the 2nd President of Senatus of Uganda.

In the East (Tororo Archdiocese), Mother Kevin (Rev. Sr. Kevin), the founder of the congregation of the Franciscan Sisters of Africa asked Teacher Mary Ester Nyakecho (RIP) to take Legion of Mary to Nagongera, St. Joan's Ssesera Girls primary school in 1946.

In the West (Mbarara Archdiocese), the nuns that were among the Legionaries that Edel Quinn had trained to help in the extension work travelled to Western Uganda in 1949. They started 4 Praesidia at Kitabi girls in Bushenyi District, Mbarara Primary Teachers' College in Mbarara District, Nyakibaale Primary Teachers' College in Rukungiri District and Ibanda Primary Teachers' College in Ibanda District.

The Senatus made efforts to extend Legion of Mary to the different parts of Uganda like areas of Mbarara, Soroti, among others.

== Spiritual directors ==
The spiritual directors are the 1st officers of the Legion of Mary. Senatus of Uganda has had the following spiritual directors.

Current and past spiritual directors of Senatus of Uganda
	Name	Took office	Left office	Description
1	Fr. Agostoni Tarcisio	1962	1969	Comboni Missionary that served Uganda for 34 years and succumbed to cancer on 15 January 2012. He is remembered as one of the founders of Radio Maria apostolate in Bbiina.
2	Fr. Joseph Mukwaya	1969	1971	He was later appointed as Auxiliary Bishop of the Archdiocese of Kampala and later Bishop of Kiyinda-Mityana. He died on 5 September 2008.
3	Fr. Emmanuel Wamala	1971	1974	He was later appointed first Bishop of Kiyinda-Mityana, Archbishop of the Archdiocese of Kampala and then elevated to Cardinal in 1994.
4	Fr. J. Galdes	1974	1978	
5	Fr. Caesar Mutyaba	1978	1985	He served also as the Episcopal vicar of Kampala, Kiyinda-Mityana and Ssezzibwa. He was a resident of St Mbaaga Seminary Ggaba for over twenty years. Pope Benedict XVI promoted Fr. Mutyaba to title of Monsignor in 2008 in appreciation of his service to the church. He passed on in July 2012.
6	Fr. Larry Kanyike	1985	1986	By that time, he served as the Chaplain of St. Augustine Chaplaincy, Makerere University. He was later transferred to St. Joseph's Catholic Parish, Kyengera. He was elevated to Monsignor by Pope Benedict XVI in 2011.
7	Fr. John Mary Bukenya	1986	1991	
8	Fr. Vincent Kanyonza	1991	1993	
9	Fr. Expedito Walakira	1993	2021	He is the Longest serving Spiritual Director of Senatus of Uganda. Fr. Walakira succumbed to Cancer on 18 May 2021.
9	Fr. Ronnie Mubiru (Assistant)	2018	2021	When the health of Fr. Walakira weakened, Rev. Fr. Ronnie Mubiru was appointed as his vice.
10	Fr. Ronnie Mubiru	2021		He was appointed by the Uganda Episcopal Conference on 29 November 2021
10	Fr. Protase Rutaremwa (Assistant)	2022		Appointed by the Uganda Episcopal Conference effective 8 December 2022

== Structures ==
Legion of Mary has its basic unit called a Praesidium, which is normally based in a sub parish. In case a sub parish does not have Legion of Mary, approach the Parish Priest and see how to start one. Praesidia hold a weekly meeting lasting at most one and a half hours in which they are assigned work to do in the course of the week. Two or more Praesidia in a city, town, or district form a Curia. In Uganda, most Curia are situated at the Parish. Different Curiae in an area may have one of them raised to form a Comitium. In Uganda, there are 25 Comitia that report directly to Senatus of Uganda.

Next to Comitia is the Regia, a title designated to a Council that exercises authority of Legion of Mary in a Large area. In Uganda, there are three Regia i.e. Regia of Western Uganda supervising Legion of Mary in Mbarara Archdiocese, Fort portal Diocese and Kasese Diocese, Kabale Regia that supervises Legion of Mary in Kabale Diocese and Tororo Regia inaugurated on 11 October 2025 to supervise Legion of Mary in Tororo Archdiocese, Jinja Diocese, Soroti Diocese, Kotido Diocese and Moroto Diocese.

Senatus of Uganda holds its meetings once a month on the third Sunday of the month.

In Uganda, Legion of Mary has a total of approximately 400,000 members that include active Legionaries, Auxiliaries, Adjutorians and Praetorians.

== See also ==
- Frank Duff
- Edel Quinn
- Alphonsus Lambe
- Catholic Church in Uganda
