= Killing of Lizzie O'Neill =

Murder of prostitute

Lizzie O'Neill (also known as Lily O'Neill and by the alias Honour Bright) was a Dublin woman who was abducted, fatally shot, and dumped at Ticknock, County Dublin, Ireland in an alleged revenge killing and act of vigilantism in June of 1925. The investigation was an early test for the newly established Irish Free State and its national police, the Garda Síochána, which eventually arrested and charged a Garda Superintendent and a rural physician with kidnapping and murder. Even though both men were acquitted, a plaque now stands in Ticknock marking the incident.

== Before her death ==
Lizzie O'Neill lived in the Liberties area of Dublin and worked as a prostitute near St Stephen's Green. It is thought that she may originally have been from Carlow. She worked in Pyms, a clothing shop, but after having a child out of wedlock became unemployed. Frank Duff visited a house she was staying at while doing charitable work for the Legion of Mary.

== Witness statements ==
One of O'Neill's associates said that a man had paid her and told her that he had been robbed of eleven pounds and a silver cigarette case earlier that evening. He was angry and said he was armed. He asked the woman's help in finding the thief and indicated that a man in a nearby car was a friend who was a superintendent in the Garda Síochána and would round up prostitutes if the thief was not found. Another woman said she saw O'Neill and a different lady with two men in a grey sports car outside the Shelbourne Hotel.

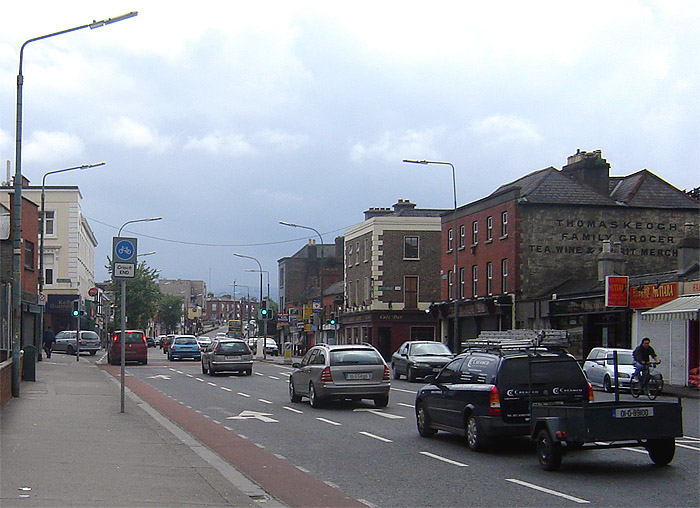
Leonard's Corner and Upper Clanbrassil Street, looking towards Robert Emmet Bridge

The last sighting of O'Neill that evening was of her getting into a car with two men at Leonard's Corner on the South Circular Road, Portobello, Dublin. She was found dead the next morning from a gunshot wound. The car was traced to a Dr. Patrick Purcell of Blessington, County Wicklow who admitted being in Dublin on the evening in question with Garda Superintendent Leo Dillon.

== Trial ==
The trial began on 30 January 1926. There was great interest partly due to the status of the accused. The defence argued that two witnesses, a taxi driver and a Garda constable, were lying. The jury acquitted the accused on the grounds that there was sufficient doubt.

Purcell emigrated to England due to difficulties with people in Blessington after the acquittal.

== See also ==
- List of unsolved murders (1900–1979)
- Prostitution in the Republic of Ireland
