= Veronica O'Brien (Catholic missionary) =

Catholic nun and missionary (1905–1998)

Veronica O'Brien (16 August 1905 – 19 February 1998) was a Catholic nun, a missionary of the Legion of Mary, a lay worker and spiritual adviser to King Baudouin of Belgium and the Belgian Cardinal Leo Joseph Suenens.

== Biography ==
Louise Mary O'Brien (from her canonical name Veronica) was born in Midleton on 16 August 1905, the daughter of Patrick O'Brien, a physicist, and Kathleen Leahy. She came from a large, devoutly Catholic family. She received her Catholic education from the Sisters of the Presentation of the Blessed Virgin Mary in Midleton.

She had a deep faith from an early age. At her First Communion, she fainted and, when she came to, said that her eyes had been opened to the mysteries of God. This incident was to be repeated several times. At home she was an undisciplined child and as a nun she found it difficult to keep the vow of obedience.

After completing her secondary education with the Sisters of St Clotilde in Eltham, Kent, she worked for a short time as an au pair in Paris. In May 1924 she applied to the Congrégation de Sainte-Clotilde in Paris and was accepted as a novice. Six months later she took the veil and was given the new name Veronica. Returning to her former school at Eltham Park, she worked towards a bachelor's degree and a teaching diploma at Cambridge while living in the convent. She took final vows on 11 August 1930. In poor health she was transferred to a convent near Lausanne in Switzerland. In November 1935 she was expelled from her congregation after she had again shown indiscipline.

Returning to London in December 1935, she began a Masters Degree in Education, which she did not complete. In 1938, she discovered in Ireland the Legion of Mary. This Catholic association of lay people, who volunteer to serve the Catholic Church, underwent, under the impetus of its Irish founder, Frank Duff, an astonishing expansion.

At the beginning of the Second World War, she left Ireland for France to establish the Legion of Mary. She arrived in Nevers, which had just been occupied by the German army. The sisters of the convent of Saint-Gildard welcomed her and she founded the Legion of Mary in Nevers in August 1940. Five years later, the Legion of Mary was present in 44 dioceses in France. After the war, she founded more than 800 base teams of the Legion of Mary, also known as praesidiums. For twenty years she was a delegate of the Legion of Mary on the continent, especially in Belgium, Greece, Turkey and the former Yugoslavia.

In 1947 she met Cardinal Suenens, with whom she began half a century of close collaboration in the service of the Church. In addition to her Catholic evangelicalism, Veronica had a Cambridge university education and a perfect command of Latin. This knowledge proved invaluable to Cardinal Suenens during the Second Vatican Council. Cardinal Suenens and Veronica also wrote many books. In all their writings we find the call to participate in the essential mission of the Church: evangelisation.

Veronica O'Brien played an important role in the wedding of King Baudouin of Belgium to Fabiola de Mora y Aragón in 1960. Over the years, the celibacy of the King who still lived in his father's house had become a matter of state. Cardinal Suenens discussed the matter with Veronica O'Brien. She met King Baudouin at the Palace of Laeken and, at his request, went to Spain to find the ideal candidate. After meeting Fabiola de Mora y Aragón on several occasions in Spain, Veronica organised a meeting between King Baudouin I and Fabiola de Mora y Aragón. Cardinal Suenens later recounted the circumstances of their meeting in a book about King Baudouin entitled "Le roi Baudouin, une vie qui vous parle" ("King Baudouin, a life that speaks to you").

She also became acquainted with the Charismatic Renewal, a Catholic movement inspired by Pentecostalism. In 1972, together with Yvette Dubois, she visited several university centres where this spiritual renewal was taking place. She took an active part in the growth of the Charismatic Renewal in Belgium, France and the United States and played an important role in the drafting of the doctrinal texts, the Malines Documents, which helped to root the charismatic enthusiasm in the Catholic tradition. She was close to Pope Paul VI and Cardinal Giovanni Benelli, with whom she played a discreet but decisive role in Rome's acceptance of the Charismatic Renewal. She became a special consultant, first in Brussels, at the residence of Cardinal Suenens, and then in Rome, to the International Secretariat of the International Catholic Charismatic Renewal Office (ICCRO, now ICCRS).

In 1984, with the support of Cardinal Suenens and the approval of Pope John Paul II, she founded a new lay apostolic movement called FIAT (Family International Apostolic Team).

She died on 19 February 1998 in Wemmel and her funeral took place in Nevers in the presence of Queen Fabiola.

== Tribute ==
In July 2015, Pope Francis paid tribute to the important role in the Charismatic Renewal played by Cardinal Suenens, who used the expression "flow of grace" to describe this movement, and Veronica O'Brien.
