= David Roberts (MCC cricketer) =

English cricketer (born 1942)

Personal information
- Full name: David John Roberts
- Born: 1 October 1942 (age 84); Harpenden, Hertfordshire, England
- Batting: Left-handed
- Bowling: Right-arm fast-medium
- Relatives: Edward Roberts (father)

Domestic team information
- Years: Team
- 1963: Marylebone Cricket Club
- 1964: Hertfordshire

Career statistics
Competition	First-class
Matches	1
Runs scored	6
Batting average	6.00
100s/50s	0/0
Top score	6
Catches/stumpings	0/–
- Source: Cricinfo, 5 July 2019

David John Roberts (born 1 October 1942) is an English former first-class cricketer.

The son of the cricketer and umpire Edward Allen Roberts, he was born at Harpenden in October 1942. He made a single appearance in first-class cricket for the Marylebone Cricket Club (MCC) against Scotland at Glasgow in 1963. Batting once in the match, he was dismissed for 6 runs in the MCC first-innings by Ronald Hogan. The following year he played minor counties cricket for Hertfordshire, making three appearances in the Minor Counties Championship.
