= Edward Allen Roberts =

English cricketer and umpire

Edward Allen Roberts (1907–1986) was an English cricketer and umpire. As a player, he appeared in nine first-class matches for Marylebone Cricket Club (MCC) and Minor Counties, and had a long career for Hertfordshire in the Minor Counties Championship. As an umpire, he stood in 98 first-class games in the mid-1950s. His son, David, also played first-class cricket for Marylebone Cricket Club.
