= Joey O'Meara =

Irish cricketer, field hockey player and sports coach and team manager

Personal information
- Full name: Joseph Anthony O'Meara
- Born: 24 June 1943; Dublin, Leinster, Ireland
- Died: 4 May 2001 (aged 57); Dublin, Leinster, Ireland
- Batting: Right-handed
- Bowling: Right-arm off break

Domestic team information
- Years: Team
- 1963: Ireland

Career statistics
Competition	First-class
Matches	1
Runs scored	0
Batting average	0.00
100s/50s	–/–
Top score	0
Balls bowled	39
Wickets	1
Bowling average	14.00
5 wickets in innings	–
10 wickets in match	–
Best bowling	1/14
Catches/stumpings	2/–
- Source: Cricinfo, 22 October 2018

Joseph Anthony O'Meara (24 June 1943 – 4 May 2001) was an Irish first-class cricketer and field hockey international.

== Life ==
O'Meara was born at Dublin and was educated at Blackrock College. Overcoming polio as a child, O'Meara would go on to have a successful sporting career.

Playing his club cricket for Railway Union, O'Meara made a single appearance in first-class cricket for Ireland against Scotland at Derry in 1963. Batting twice during the match, O'Meara was dismissed without scoring in Ireland's first-innings by Ronald Hogan, while in their second-innings he was dismissed again without scoring by Stuart Wilson. He took a solitary wicket in the match, dismissing Malcolm Ford with his off break bowling in Scotland's second-innings. He managed the Ireland cricket team for a period.

O'Meara was more noted as an international hockey player for Ireland, making 52 appearances. He later coached the national hockey team.

He died at Dublin in May 2001.
