= Blackrock College =

Fee-paying secondary day and boarding school, Dublin, Ireland

- Coláiste na Carraige Duibhe

Location
- Williamstown, Blackrock, County Dublin; Ireland; 53°18′17″N 6°11′30″W

Information
- Type: Voluntary day and boarding school
- Motto: Fides et Robur (Latin) (Faith and Strength)
- Religious affiliation: Catholic Church (Holy Ghost Fathers)
- Established: 1860; 166 years ago
- Founder: Jules Leman
- Sister school: St. Michael's College, St. Mary's College, Templeogue College, Rockwell College
- President: Cormac Ó Brolcháin, CSSp
- Principal: Yvonne Markey
- Staff: 75 full time, 25 part-time
- Years: 2nd–6th
- Gender: Male
- Age: 12 to 19
- Enrollment: 1000 (200 per year)
- Houses: Browne, DeValera, Duff, Ebenrecht, Leman, Shanahan
- Colours: Blue and white
- Alumni: Old Rockmen
- Religious order: Holy Ghost Fathers (Spiritans)
- Website: blackrockcollege.com

Blackrock College (Irish: Coláiste na Carraige Duibhe) is a voluntary day and boarding Catholic secondary school for boys aged 13–18, in Williamstown, Blackrock, County Dublin, Ireland. It was founded by French missionary Jules Leman in 1860 as a school and later became also a civil service training centre.

The college, 7 kilometres (4.3 miles) from Dublin city centre, is just in from the sea, and is self-contained, with boarding and teaching facilities in 56 acres of parkland. It accommodates approximately 1,000 day and boarding students. As of 2023, Blackrock is run by the Congregation of the Holy Spirit, in close co-operation with a dedicated group of lay personnel.

== History ==
The college was founded in 1860 by Jules Leman, a French missionary with the Congregation of the Holy Ghost, and was the first of the order's five schools in Ireland. Leman had a dual aim, namely to train personnel for missionary service in the Third World and to provide a first-class Roman Catholic education for Irish boys. It was originally known as the French College by the locals. A civil service training and university department (where students were examined and had degrees conferred by the Royal University of Ireland) was later added and operated for over forty years, until University College Dublin grew, and the school focused more on the secondary curriculum.

Although never a seminary, some ordinations have taken place in Blackrock College. The first ordination there was on 22 April 1900, when Emile Allgeyer (a former student of Blackrock and the first to be made a bishop), ordained Joseph Shanahan who later became a bishop and has a house named after him within the school. From 1924 until 1933 the Holy Ghost Fathers studied theology at Blackrock Castle, before returning to Kimmage Manor.

In June 1932, college president John Charles McQuaid, hosted a large garden party on the grounds of the college to welcome the papal legate, Lorenzo Lauri, where the many hundreds of bishops assembled for the Eucharistic Congress of Dublin (1932) had the opportunity to mingle with a huge gathering of distinguished guests, including president of the executive council, Éamon de Valera, and others who had paid a modest subscription fee.

Blackrock pays homage to its historical founders and other influential figures through its six student house names: De Valera, Duff, Ebenrecht, Leman, Browne, Shanahan.

=== Heraldry ===
The coat of arms of the college is the third creation, dating back to 1936, and shows a blue cross and a dove in its natural colours on a silver field, with a lion rampant in the first quarter. This is blazoned in the 1937 College Annual as follows:

ARGENT: – On a Cross Azure, the Dove of the Holy Ghost, Proper, with seven Rays descendant, Or. In the first quarter a Lion rampant of the second.

On 30 April 1926 Leen at a sports day speech encapsulated the words Fides et Robur, which henceforth became the Rock motto. In 1928, a new College Crest, bearing four emblems around a blue cross was hurriedly officiated, primarily to show off the motto over the college's specially built new front gates. Not everyone was happy with this design and possible variations of a new design may have been experimented with; evidence exists that both in the crest and in the uniform, by reason of fault or debate, and most likely between 1928 and 1936, a distinctive crest had been "with nine rays descendant, Or". In 1936, McQuaid instigated a new and distinctive crest that to this day is in continual use (unchecked variations and wayward deviations are contracted into stores by stationery and uniform suppliers). It was adopted on blazers that year and a heraldic description of the arms of the college was published (though not officially registered) in the 1937 Blackrock College Annual. It was commissioned into stained glass in 1938, presumably in its true and intended likeness and survives today at the end of one of the house corridors, though its conformity to the true heraldic interpretations is not accurate; "a Lion Rampant of the second" would correctly reveal only a blue silhouette of a rampant lion, that is, minus any fine caricature details so apparent in the existing variations.

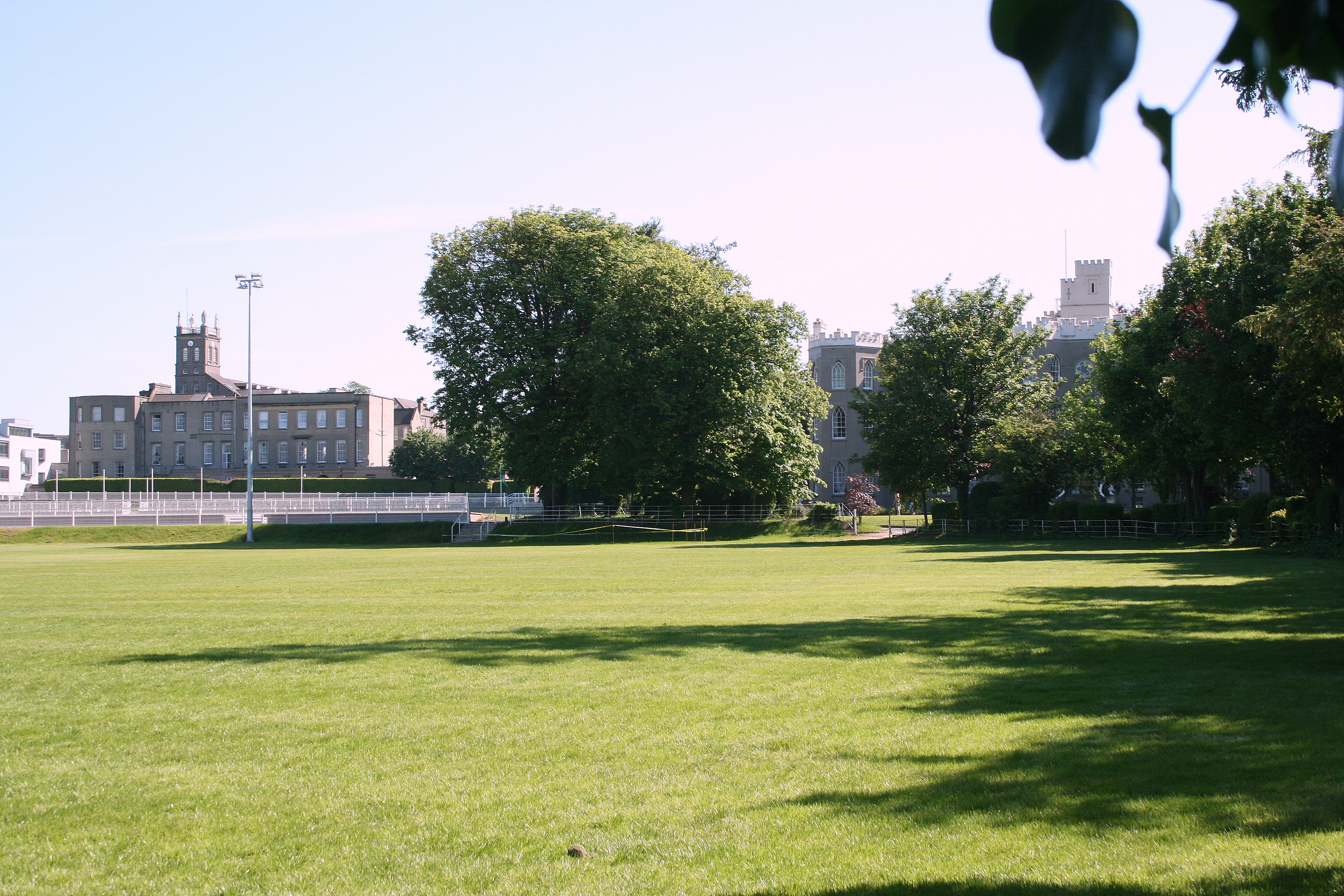
Blackrock College

== Status and operation ==
Blackrock is now run by the Congregation of the Holy Ghost in close co-operation with a dedicated group of lay personnel. The annual fees for students in 2011 were €6,300 for day boys, €17,250 for boarders and €18,250 for overseas boarders.

The college and its sister schools in Ireland are today held in trust by the Des Places Educational Association, which, as the college's patron, aims to maintain the Spiritan ethos in all five schools – Blackrock, Rockwell, St. Mary's, St. Michael's and Templeogue – conducted by the Congregation of the Holy Spirit in Ireland.

== Curriculum ==
The curriculum offered is broad, covering all common subjects in the State Examinations including Latin, German, art, music, business, materials technology wood, science and history. Inspections by the Department of Education found exemplary standards of teaching and learning. The Irish Times placed the college in the "Top Ten" schools in the state, based on the proportion of students who accept a place in higher or further education.

== Boarding school ==
The boarding school is housed in Williamstown Castle (known by students as "The Castle"). Williamstown Castle was built around 1780 on lands rented by the Fitzwilliams, later Pembrokes, to Counsellor William Vavasour. It resembled other spacious houses in the area including Willow Park and Castledawson, but a later owner, Thomas O'Mara, extensively redeveloped the building and its surrounds, adding the castellated finish, hence making it into a 'castle'. O'Mara had acted as an election agent for Daniel O'Connell, who dined in the castle on occasion, and for years a portrait of O'Connell adorned the room which is now the oratory. Tiernan Mealiffe is the director of boarding in the college. The boarding school contains around 100 students. Boarding is available from first year up to sixth year. Some day boys join the boarding school in 6th year in preparation for their Leaving Certificate. Boarders are allowed to leave the castle with permission.

== Extra curricular activities ==
=== Field sports ===
Sport is viewed as an integral part of a Blackrock College pupils education and each pupil is expected to participate in some activity. The principal sport in the college is rugby, with Blackrock having won the Leinster Schools Senior Cup 73 times (a figure larger than every other teams wins combined).

It has also won the Leinster Schools Junior Cup 53 times. Blackrock won the inaugural cup competition held in 1887 and has been consistently the most successful team, winning the cup at least three times in every decade since.

Retired Blackrock rugby union players include Fergus Slattery, Niall Brophy, Hugo MacNeill and Brendan Mullin (all playing before rugby union was professional), former British and Irish Lions, Ireland and Leinster captain Brian O'Driscoll, Shane Byrne, Victor Costello, Luke Fitzgerald, and the current Leinster Rugby head coach and former Irish international Leo Cullen. Current professional players include Bristol and Ireland's Ian Madigan, Leinster and Ireland players Garry Ringrose, Caelan Doris and Jordi Murphy, Munster and Ireland's Andrew Conway and Joey Carbery, Sale Sharks and US Eagles' AJ MacGinty, Connachts Dave Heffernan and multiple others around Ireland and the world.

Blackrock v St Michael's 2006 Leinster Schools Senior Cup final at Lansdowne Road

Gaelic football is played in 4th year in the college. Past pupils Mark Vaughan and Niall Corkery are forwards on the Dublin Gaelic football team. The school also has a hurling team for 2nd and 3rd years. Five members of the All Ireland Club Championship winning Kilmacud Crokes team of 2008–09 were past pupils of Blackrock College. The college has a soccer team for its senior pupils in 4th, 5th and 6th years. In 2003 a team from the school won the Leinster and All-Ireland U-17s schools cup.

=== Swimming ===
The college has a swimming team, which combines 1st to 6th year. The college competes in Leinster Senior Schools and has won the senior relay cup multiple times, most recently in 2017, and the Irish senior schools, regularly making finals and achieving gold in 2017. The school has two 25-metre (82 ft) swimming pools on the grounds. The junior school Willow Park also has a swimming team. The college has teams in other water sports such as water polo and 4th years participate in rowing.

=== Other games ===
Table tennis is another one of the college's sports with many of its students participating. Many players come from 2nd year with older years fielding fewer numbers. 2010 saw the Blackrock Senior A team retain the Leinster Schools Senior Cup, won for the first time in 2009, while the seniors also won the Leinster Senior League for the first time since 1968, as well as reaching the final of the Senior All Irelands for the first time. 2010 saw the junior team reach the Junior Cup final for the 3rd year in a row, however in 2008 and 2009 the Blackrock Junior A team completed the Leinster double, with victories in both Junior Cup and Junior League, and also reached the final of the Junior All Irelands in both seasons. In 2010, the Senior A team competed in the World Schools Championships for the first time.

The college has its own basketball team run by teachers as well as professional coaches. The college has three outdoor basketball courts and different indoor basketball courts on the grounds. One indoor basketball court is in Willow Park gym, and one is in the Jubilee Hall while the introduction of the new sports hall provides a professional basketball court and spectator area.

The school has a tennis team divided between minors, juniors and seniors. They practise and play their home matches on the college's four tennis courts. 1st years in Willow Park also play on the college's tennis teams. The college also has teams in other sports such as cricket, golf, rowing and Judo. Cricket has been played since the foundation of the school in 1860. There has been a renaissance on the cricket pitch in the last 10 years since the building of the new sports hall which is fully equipped with 2 full-sized practice lanes. This investment in cricket has helped the college to win its first Junior Cricket Trophy since 1964 and reach its first Senior Cup Final since 1961. Other sports include rowing, badminton and a full athletics programme.

=== Cycling ===
Blackrock College and Willow Park share a cycling club called the Willow Wheelers, run by Christy McDaid. The club has an annual trip abroad to either France or The Netherlands each Easter, recently in Cap D'Agde. It also has hostel trips to Clare and Donegal at the end of the school year. The club has an annual 160-kilometre (99 mi) cycle for charity which has raised around 150,000 euro in the past few years. The club cycles every Sunday to varying destinations around Dublin.

=== The arts ===
Each year, opera productions are staged in conjunction with Mount Anville (senior musical) and Loreto Abbey, Dalkey (2nd and 4th-year musical), two nearby schools for girls.

Debating is a tradition dating back to the school's founding in the 1860s. There are separate clubs for junior and senior pupils. One of the college alumni, Shane Murphy (now a Senior Counsel), won the 1985 World University Debating Championship at McGill University, representing the Honourable Society of the King's Inns. The college holds gold medal debates for every academic year giving the students the opportunity to win the medal on prize day if they win the debate. The gold medal debates are used in the sixth year to select an eligible valedictorian for the year, who gives his address at both the graduation mass and again at prize day. The college's debaters participate in many competitions including the L&H debates in UCD.

The college has two main choirs: the Leman and the Libermann choirs. The Leman choir has members from the 2nd, 4th, 5th and 6th years. The best of the senior members of the Leman choir are accepted into the Libermann choir. In 2013, a group of students from the college's Leman choir reached the final of the All Island Choir Competition. The college has a choir for boarders and another for parents. The college has a youth orchestra. Each year, all the choirs and the orchestra host the annual Leman Concert in the National Concert Hall.

=== Blackrock College Radio ===
A transition year program to set up and maintain a radio station, broadcasting to the surrounding south Dublin area, is undertaken annually. All of the administrative work, promotion and content-creation is the labour of transition year students. The station also allows programming submissions from other schools to be broadcast. It's the only second-level radio project that broadcasts nine and a half hours a day (8:00 am to 5:30 pm), five days a week. The station has a mix of programmes from its current affairs programming to its guest programming. Blackrock College Radio has featured many famous and influential guests including Enda Kenny, while in office as Taoiseach, Neil Flynn, Ryan Tubridy, Eamon Gilmore, Leo Cullen, Mary Hannifin, Micheál Martin, Ruairi Quinn, Brent Pope, David Norris, The Heathers, Bobby Kerr, and Denis O'Brien.

=== Seachtain na Gaeilge ===
Each year a Seachtain na Gaeilge (literally, "Week of Irish") is organised to promote the Irish language in the school. The Irish department organises events each year to mark this occasion including ceili dance, poc fada (longest hit) and screens Irish films. This co-curricular activity was particularly commended in a Department of Education inspection, which also recommended its further development.

== Social work ==
=== Past pupils' efforts ===
Bob Geldof, initiator of the Band Aid and Live Aid movements for famine relief in the 1980s, was a student at the college. Frank Duff, the founder of the Legion of Mary, the Catholic lay movement, is also a past pupil. In his memoirs, Straight Left: A Journey in Politics Ruairi Quinn cites the ethos and "sense of solidarity" with the Third World that was imparted to students, including Bob Geldof, as a formative force. The Holy Ghost Fathers were (and remain) an active missionary order in Africa. He wrote:

The poverty of distant Africa was brought into our classrooms by our returned missionary teachers.

— Ruairi Quinn, Straight Left, pg. 36

== Associated primary schools ==
Willow Park School, a private primary school that acts as the college's principal feeder, is also run by the order and is situated on the same campus. Until the early 1970s, St. Michael's College in Ballsbridge was also a feeder school for Blackrock College, but now has classes up to the Leaving Certificate.

== Child sexual abuse ==
Members of the Spiritans have been associated with a number of child sexual abuse cases in Ireland; the Spiritans acknowledged in 2022 that they had paid out over €5m (£4.4m) in settlements for sexual abuse cases since 2004. In 2022 the Garda Síochána were involved in the investigation; 233 people had made allegations against 77 members of the Spiritans. Martin Kelly, leader of the Spiritans, admitted and apologised for abuse. At least six abusers are known to have operated at Blackrock College; in November 2022, it was reported that 57 people had alleged that they had been abused on campus. Following the revelations, the government commissioned a scoping report into what had occurred. Almost 2,400 allegations of historic abuse at schools run by Catholic religious orders, including Blackrock, were found; in response to this report, in 2024 it was reported that a statutory commission of inquiry would be set up.

As of 2022 one of its six student houses, McQuaid, continued to be named after alleged child sex offender John Charles McQuaid.

Now, the McQuaid house has been replaced by the Browne house, named after James Browne, Blackrock's first student.

== Past pupils ==
The Blackrock College Union represents former students of the college, organises many charitable events throughout the year, assists the school (e.g., mentoring, management assistance, advice) and organises social events for members. There are branches in Ireland and across the world.

Early Free State ministers such as Art O'Connor (secretary for agriculture 1921–1922), and Éamon de Valera, six times Taoiseach and the 3rd president of Ireland, studied and later taught in Blackrock. Modern politicians include Eoin O'Broin, Ruairi Quinn (a former minister and leader of the Labour Party) and Barry Andrews, a former junior minister. Many businessmen have also attended the school such as David J. O'Reilly, chairman and former CEO of Chevron Corporation, and Brendan O'Regan, founder of Shannon Airport and proponent of the Irish peace and reconciliation process. Philip R. Lane (governor of the central bank), Ronan Dunne (EVP and group president of Verizon Wireless) also attended the college.

Writer Flann O'Brien, and journalist and scholar Tim Pat Coogan, were students of the school. Alumni in the fine arts include designer Paul Costelloe, composer Michael McGlynn and visual artist Robert Ballagh. The Holy Ghost Order has a long tradition of missionaries. Frank Duff, founder of the Legion of Mary, is perhaps the best-known. Singer, songwriter, author and political activist Bob Geldof was also a student at the college. Eminent handbag designer Pauric Sweeney also calls Blackrock his alma mater. Radio and TV personality Ryan Tubridy attended the college. Singer-songwriter and producer Jonathon Ng (better known as EDEN) attended Blackrock, and in 2014 a video was posted on the college's YouTube account of Ng performing a song entitled "Amnesia".

The college places a heavy emphasis on sport. Past pupils include Ireland internationals Brian O'Driscoll, former Ireland and Lions captain, Luke Fitzgerald, Victor Costello, a 20-year Leinster, Ireland and Blackrock College RFC veteran, who also represented Ireland in shot putting at the Olympics, Leo Cullen, former captain, now coach of the Leinster Rugby team and Shane Byrne, Leinster and Ireland professional rugby player. The current Ireland international team includes Ian Madigan, Jordi Murphy, Garry Ringrose, Andrew Conway and Joey Carbery, other Rugby internationals Include Vasily Artemyev (formerly of Russia), AJ MacGinty (USA) and Dylan Fawsitt (USA)

In other games, Michael Cusack, founder of the Gaelic Athletic Association taught at the school and played early forms of hurling with the pupils. Golfer John O'Leary (winner of the Carrolls Irish Open), Alan Lee (Ireland soccer international) and Joey O'Meara (who represented Ireland in both Hockey and Cricket), also went to Blackrock. Retired Dublin GAA footballer Cian O'Sullivan and professional golfer Paul Dunne attended the college.
