= Prostitution in the Republic of Ireland =

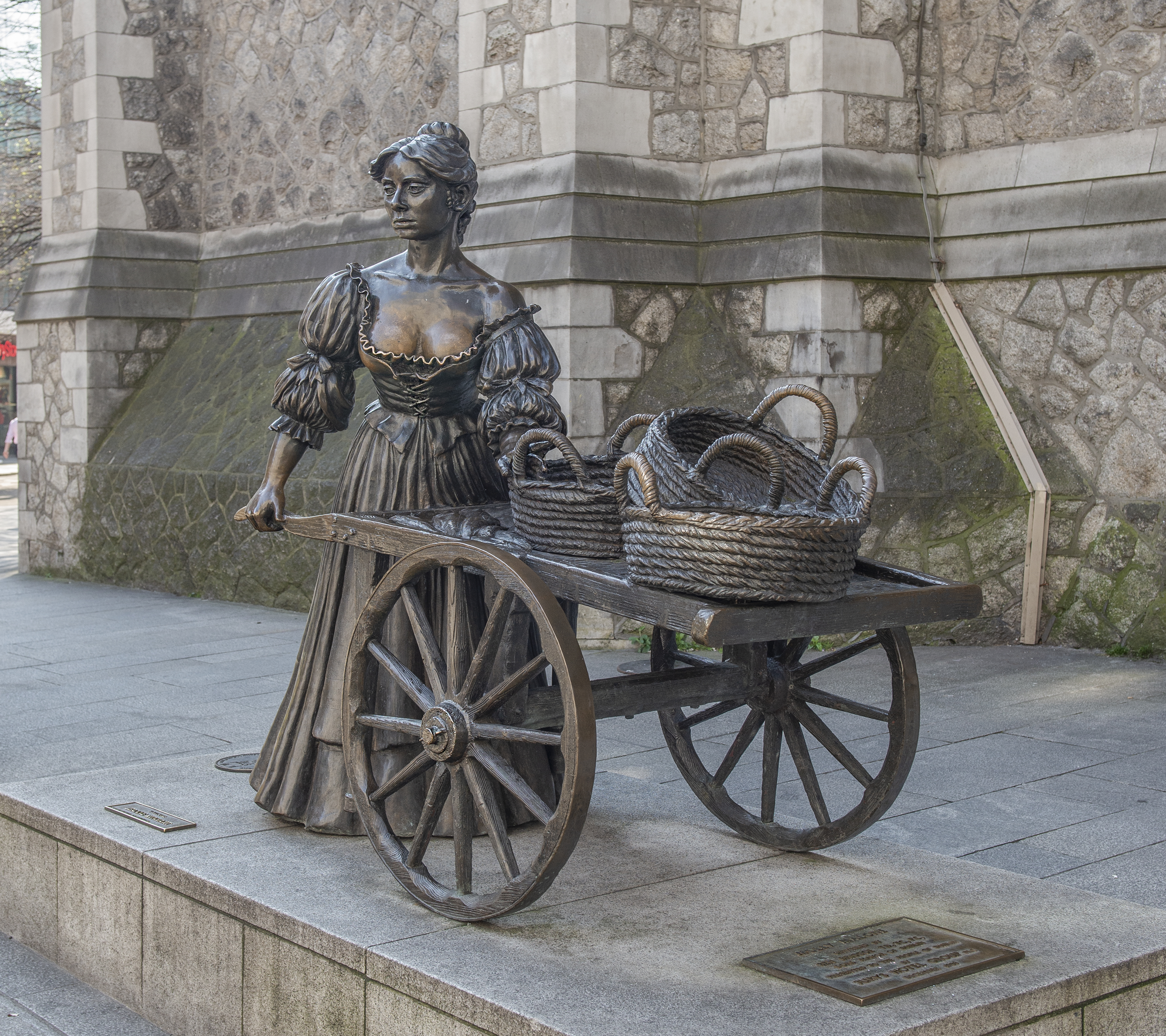
On Dublin's Suffolk Street stands a statue of the fictitious Molly Malone, who in popular lore is conceived as a fishmonger by day and a prostitute by night.

Prostitution in Ireland is legal. However, since March 2017, it has been an offence to buy sex. All forms of third party involvement (such as operating brothels, sex trafficking, and other forms of pimping) are illegal but are commonly practiced. Since the law that criminalises clients came into being, with the purpose of reducing the demand for prostitution, the number of prosecutions for the purchase of sex increased from 10 in 2018 to 92 in 2020. In a report from UCD's Sexual Exploitation Research Programme the development is called ”a promising start in interrupting the demand for prostitution.” Most prostitution in Ireland occurs indoors. Street prostitution has declined considerably in the 21st century, with the vast majority of prostitution now advertised on the internet.

== History ==
=== Eighteenth century ===
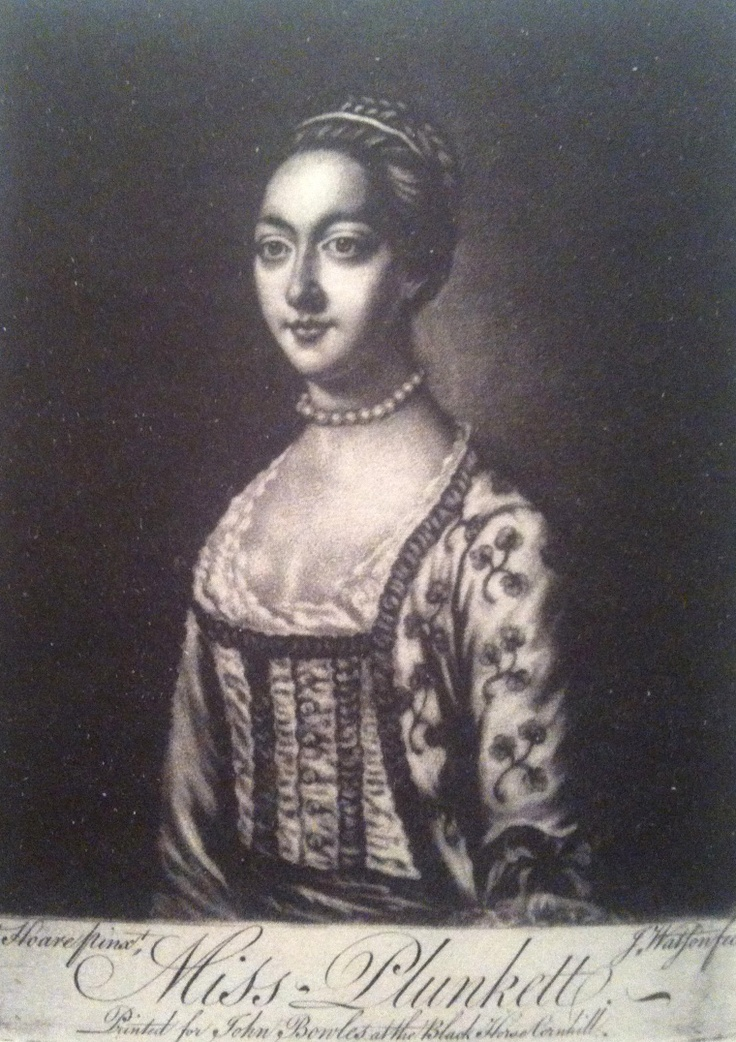
18th century Dublin prostitute and madam Peg Plunkett

Prostitution was both highly visible and pervasive in 18th-century Dublin, centred on Temple Bar and reflected the whole spectrum of socioeconomic class, from street prostitutes, through organised brothels to high class courtesans, who were often illegitimate daughters of the upper class. A well-known example was Peg Plunkett. The role of the prostitute in 18th-century Ireland was at least partly a product of the double standard of female sexuality. Typical of this was the way that venereal disease was constructed as being spread by prostitutes rather than their largely male clients. Female Irish prostitutes were frequently the victims of violence against women. Early 'rescue' campaigns emerged in this time with Lady Arabella Denny and the Magdalene Asylums. These provided shelter but in return expected menial labour and penitence.

The most famous madam in the Dublin of the 1700s was alleged female serial killer Dorcas "Darkey" Kelly who operated the Maiden Tower kip house on Copper Alley, off Fishamble Street in the southwest part of the city. Convicted of murdering and dismembering shoemaker John Dowling on St. Patrick's Day 1760, Kelly was executed by partial hanging and burning at the stake on Gallows Road (modern Baggot Street) on 7 January 1761. After her execution she was waked by prostitutes on Copper Alley; thirteen of whom were arrested for disorder and sent to Newgate Prison, Dublin.

The Royal Barracks (modern day Collins Barracks) in Dublin was completed in 1702 and Barrack Street, which ran directly in front of it (renamed Benburb Street in 1890), became associated with sex work over the centuries. As with most garrison towns in Ireland, prostitution proliferated in areas surrounding Army barracks, as impoverished Irishwomen gravitated towards military personnel, who were in receipt of a steady income. The area was comparable to the Monto in Dublin, whose sex trade reached its zenith from the 1860s until the 1950s and whose profits were also aided by the large number of troops stationed in the city over the period. In 1837, 135 years after the barracks had been established, Barrack Street was described by a visitor as consisting of "a line of brothels and low public-houses" and "filled with the most abandoned crew of rogues and prostitutes which even all Dublin, with its unhappy pre-eminence in that species of population, can produce". In the late nineteenth century the street was chosen as the location for the first Dublin Corporation housing scheme, due to the cheaper cost of purchasing land in areas with long-standing social problems.

=== Nineteenth century ===
The changing nature of Irish culture following the successful fight for Catholic Emancipation between 1780 and 1829 saw a redefining of the status of women. The Catholic Church in Ireland finally began to rebuild after centuries of religious persecution and in the face of continuing religious discrimination and mass destitution caused by rackrenting Anglo-Irish landlords. There was, as a result, an increasing romanticising of priests, monks, nuns, and sober, hardworking Catholic families at one extreme and an extreme hostility towards male rakes and the fallen women, including prostitutes, whose lives they had ruined, at the other.

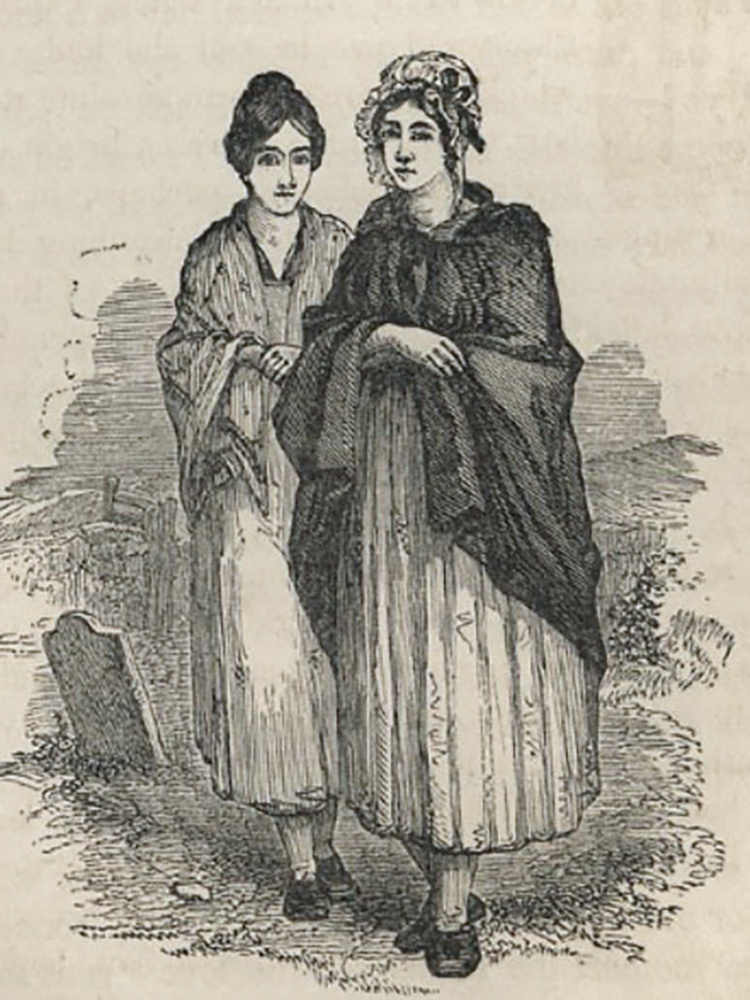
An artist's depiction of the Wrens of the Curragh

Meanwhile, the Wrens of the Curragh, for instance, were a group of Irish sex workers working as camp followers at the Curragh Camp, a military camp in County Kildare. Both Victorian era neo-Puritanism rooted in the rise and growth of a heavily Evangelical middle class and an escalating fear of venereal disease, particularly as a threat to the stability of the armed forces, led to the introduction of a series of Contagious Diseases Acts in the 1860s. These Acts enabled the Irish Constabulary to arrest any woman suspected of prostitution and force her to submit to a medical examination for venereal disease. As in many other countries, opposition to the Acts provided a rallying cry for emerging women's movements. Anna Haslam in Dublin and Isabella Tod in Belfast, both of the Ladies National Association, organised opposition and a recognition not only of the plight of these women but also of the root causes.

One of the most famous male prostitutes in both Ireland and the United Kingdom during the second half of the 1800s was Dublin-born John Saul, also known as Jack Saul, or "Dublin Jack". He featured in two major homosexual scandals of the time (the Dublin Castle scandal in 1884 and Cleveland Street scandal in 1889), and also featured as a character in two works of pornographic literature of the period. Saul was considered "notorious in Dublin and London" and "made infamous by the sensational testimony he gave in the Cleveland Street scandal", which was publicised in newspapers around the world. His life and career have been the subject of scholarly analysis and speculation, one reason being the paucity of information on the lives and outlook of individual male prostitutes of the period. Saul referred to himself as "a professional Mary-Ann" – a period euphemism for rentboy, and stated: "I have lost my character and cannot get on otherwise. I occasionally do odd-jobs for different gay people."

=== Twentieth century ===
During the mid to late 19th century, it has been estimated that 17,000 women were working as prostitutes in Dublin alone, and a further 8 brothels in Cork. Dublin's sex trade was largely centred on the Monto district, reputedly the largest red light district in Europe. A major part of the demand came from the large number of military personnel stationed in Ireland at the time.

In Kevin Kearns' oral history collection Dublin Tenement Life, however, he comments that many of the prostitutes in the Monto had, like Philomena Lee, been unmarried and pregnant and were disowned both by their families and by their babies' fathers. Although middle class and suburban Dubliners viewed them as whores, the impoverished but devoutly Catholic residents of Monto tenements referred to prostitutes as, "unfortunate girls," and understood that they had turned to prostitution as a last resort. According to Kearns, "By all accounts, the girls were typically young, attractive, and known for their generosity, especially to slum children."

Billy Dunleavy, reflecting on his youth in the Monto during the Irish War of Independence, described the women involved in prostitution as mostly rural girls who had fallen into hardship after unplanned pregnancies, often abandoned by the fathers. Many spent time in convents where they endured harsh treatment before ending up "on the town". While madams provided them with new clothes to attract clients, the girls faced exploitation and control, including being stripped of their clothes if they withheld money. Despite the stigma, Dunleavy recalled them as kind and respectable, often friendly with local residents.

Kearns notes that the madams were savvy Dublin women who operated their brothels with strict authority. They profited significantly, some becoming wealthy and socially mobile, while exerting control over their workers’ movements and finances. Many brothels also sold alcohol illegally to increase profits.

Dunleavy also recounted the grim reality faced by women suffering from venereal diseases, particularly syphilis. He alleged that at the Lock Hospital on Townsend Street, some women were euthanised when their condition was incurable, due to the absence of effective medical treatment at the time.

==== Post-Independence (1921 onwards) ====
===== Demise of the Monto =====
Many Irish republicans perceived prostitution and other forms of sex work in Ireland as the natural result of British rule, and planned for the industry's suppression after Irish independence was achieved. The aftermath of the Irish War of Independence was accordingly widely assumed by Irish republicans to automatically cause the end of Monto as a red light district. In reality, while the departure of British forces from Ireland severely damaged the financial prospects of Irish sex workers, organised prostitution continued in the Monto.

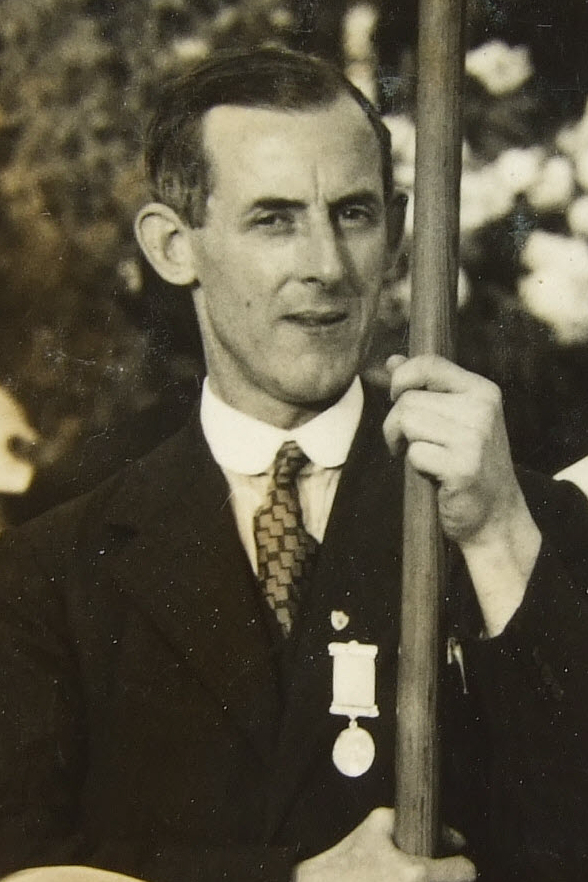
Frank Duff campaigned against the existence of the Monto.

Between 1921 and 1925, Frank Duff, the founder of the Legion of Mary and Fr. R.S. Devane, who both called for the social purification of Irish culture, launched a campaign to close down the kip-houses and clean up The Monto. Similarly to St. Vitalis of Gaza before them, Duff and Devane began an outreach to the prostitutes living in often brutal and inhuman conditions in the "kip houses". As part of this work, Duff established the Sancta Maria hostel, a safe house for former prostitutes whom the Legion of Mary helped to run away from their "kip keepers" and start a new life. Following the Irish War of Independence, Duff also persuaded the first Catholic Commissioner of the Dublin Metropolitan Police, former Irish Army general W. R. E. Murphy, to launch an iron-gloved crackdown. The raids ended with 120 arrests and Gen. Murphy announced the closure of all the remaining brothels following massive DMP raids on 12 March 1925.

Prostitution, including smaller Kip-Houses posing as pubs and operating discreetly while paying protection money to corrupt Irish politicians and law enforcement, continued to exist in Dublin. These kip-houses included the "Cozy Kitchen" on North King Street and "Cafe Continental" on Bolton Street, both of which were run by Dublin kip-keeper Dolly Fawcett and remained open until well into the 1950s.

According to Northside resident Noelle Hughes, who knew Dolly Fawcett in her seventies, "The Cozy Kitchen" was located in the basement of a tenement house at 2 North King Street and was run by Dolly's son Stephen Fawcett until it closed down in 1957. Dolly's other son ran the Cafe Continental on Bolton Street. According to retired Guard Paddy Casey, the Cafe Continental was located next to the Bolton Street Technical School.

According to Hughes, prostitution in the area was widespread and visible, involving mostly working-class country women in their late teens to thirties who charged modest sums and met clients in flats, laneways, or alleyways. The activity was common knowledge across Dublin, particularly among sailors and dockworkers, as local men typically could not afford the services. Though police occasionally raided the area, they were often bribed to turn a blind eye. Despite some calls to shut it down, no action was taken until the operation eventually ceased and those running it left for England.

But for the most part, prostitution in Ireland overwhelmingly shifted into individual women offering to sell sexual services to passing motorists while walking along urban streets. It was half a century before non-police and non-political organised crime would dominate Irish prostitution again. Until then, streetwalking prostitutes remained intrinsically linked to the Dublin criminal underworld. The 1920s and 1930s also witnessed a new era in both Church and State morality and increasing censorship in Ireland. The Magdalene Asylums - per O'Reilly - have at this time become punitive and to have imprisoned unwed mothers, some for the duration of their lives, until the last asylum closed in 1996.

This is why, however, the Regina Coeli hostel which was opened in Dublin in 1930 following the Legion of Mary's crusade against the kip-keepers in the Monto, reflected their founder Frank Duff's belief that unwed mothers should be taught how to provide for and raise their children. By doing this Frank Duff and the Legion of Mary, were defying the established consensus at a time when Irish culture was still very Jansenistic, which held that the children of unwed mothers should be protected from the stigma of their illegitimacy by being put up for adoption as quickly as possible.

===== Changes in the law =====
The Criminal Law Amendment Act 1935 prohibited contraception and required sex crimes cases to be tried in camera and prevented media coverage. In the 1950s there was much public attention around the plight of Irish women working as prostitutes in England. These were portrayed not so much as 'fallen' women, but rather as innocents lured into evil. The Women's Liberation Movement of the 1970s helped to expose the double standards. Notable was the story of June Levine who collaborated with Lyn Madden, a former Dublin sex worker for twenty years in the 70s and 80s, to write Lyn: A Story of Prostitution (1987) Madden witnessed her pimp, John Cullen, firebomb the home of former prostitute and women's rights activist Dolores Lynch. Lynch, her elderly mother, and aunt, all perished in the fire. Madden later testified against Cullen and began writing the book during his trial, at which her former pimp received eighteen years imprisonment.

At around this time, a group of streetwalkers brought a successful High Court challenge to the constitutionality of Victorian era laws that required a defendant to be identified as a prostitute through the citing of previous convictions before conviction was possible. This successful challenge caused the de facto decriminalisation of prostitution. During this period prostitutes were largely independent and had a good relationship with the Gardaí. Pimping was ignored, as were the other crimes previously associated with prostitution. Any suggestion of organised prostitution was limited to a small number of massage parlours in an environment where the workers were empowered to negotiate favourable terms and conditions for themselves. By the 90s secularisation along with economic factors resulted in a large and broadly tolerated sex industry.

The Criminal Law (Sexual Offences) Act 1993, made soliciting a criminal offence for both prostitutes and their customers. Street prostitution declined and the women entered massage parlours to avoid arrest. By the late 1990s the age of the brothel, and the brothel-keeper, had returned. Society seemed accepting of discreet, indoor prostitution establishments and every week the mainstream entertainment magazine In Dublin ran advertisements for escort services and 'massage parlours' (brothels), which were usually the business operations of a small number of men and women, who knew running brothels was illegal, but were prepared to take the risk, given the massive profits involved. The magazine earned substantial revenue from these advertisements.

The blatant wealth of Ireland's brothel-keepers in the 1990s was such that the media began to take more interest. Section 23 of the Criminal Justice (Public Order) Act 1994 prohibited the advertising of brothels and prostitution and in 1999 the Censorship of Publications Board banned In Dublin magazine from carrying escort advertisements. Criminal proceedings were also brought against the magazine's publisher, Mike Hogan. The In Dublin magazine case heralded the end of escort advertising in print publications. However, the suppression of advertising had little effect as the internet and mobile phones were changing the nature of the trade. Ireland's first escort website, Escort Ireland, had already established itself the previous year to take over In Dublin magazine's role.

Of note was the frequent reference to the inadequacy of the existing legislation, but there was little debate about possible alternative models. While Ireland has an international commitment to protecting the well-being of women trafficked to Ireland for the purposes of prostitution, there was little or no discussion about the rights and well-being of Irish women working in prostitution. The violent murders of prostitutes Belinda Pereira, a UK resident working for a Dublin escort agency on 28 December 1996 and Sinead Kelly a young street prostitute in 1998 caused questions to be raised about the benefits of the 1993 act. Until Belinda Periera was murdered in a city centre apartment in the winter of 1996, the last murder of a prostitute while working (Dolores Lynch was murdered in her home in 1983, and seems to have no longer been working as a prostitute at the time) was in 1925 when the body of Lily O'Neill (known as "Honor Bright") was found in the Dublin Mountains.

Benburb Street remained a slum for most of the twentieth century, composed of overcrowded tenements and even after the transition of Collins Barracks into a museum in 1997 the surrounding neighbourhood has remained a noted red light district. In May 1997, as many as 100 women were reported to be still working as prostitutes along Benburb Street.

Perhaps the most infamous Irish organised crime figure known for involvement in organised prostitution was John Traynor, who was a longtime confidential source within the Dublin criminal underworld for Sunday Independent investigative journalist Veronica Guerin and a prime suspect in allegedly arranging her 1996 contract killing.

1999 also saw the launch of Operation Gladiator, a Garda Siochana investigation into those who profit from organised crime-controlled prostitution. It was the first since the Dublin Metropolitan Police crackdown on the Monto in 1925 and lasted under a year, but in that time it identified and built cases against several major Dublin kip-keepers.

=== Twenty-first century ===
Operation Quest was launched by the Gardaí in 2003, with the aim of tackling human trafficking, prostitution and organised crime within the Irish lap dancing industry, followed by Operation Hotel in 2005, with the aim of tackling the trafficking of women from Eastern Europe to work in the sex industry in Ireland. Essentially the legal framework has not changed over twenty years, but discussions about alternatives emerged in 2011 (see Politics).

== Legal status ==
Prostitution itself is not an offence under Irish law. However, the Criminal Law (Sexual Offences) Act of 1993 prohibits soliciting or importuning another person in a street or public place for the purpose of prostitution (this offence applies to prostitute and client). It also prohibits loitering for the purpose of prostitution, organising prostitution by controlling or directing the activities of a person in prostitution, coercing one to practice prostitution for gain, living on earnings of the prostitution of another person, and keeping a brothel or other premises for the purpose of prostitution.

Advertising brothels and prostitution is prohibited by the Criminal Justice (Public Order) Act of 1994. The minimum legal age for a prostitute in Ireland is 18 years (child prostitution legislation exists to protect persons under this age). The Criminal Law (Trafficking in Persons and Sexual Offences) Bill 2006 came into force making trafficking in persons for the purpose of their sexual exploitation a specific offence, though previous legislation already covered much of this area.

On 27 March 2017, the Criminal Law (Sexual Offences) Act 2017 was commenced into force. The Act significantly amends the 1993 Act to provide that a person who pays, gives, offers or promises to pay or give a person (including a prostitute) money or any other form of remuneration or consideration for the purpose of engaging in sexual activity with a prostitute shall be guilty of an offence and shall be liable on conviction to a fine of up to €500 for a first offence, and a fine of up to €1,000 for each subsequent offence.

== Politics ==
Discussion of proposed law reform became an issue in the 2011 elections, with some support from opposition parties likely to become the new Government. A group of non-government and union bodies emerged pressuring both the current government and opposition parties to abolish prostitution, by criminalising the buying of sex, along Swedish lines. At the same time, those supporting the status quo or advocating a more liberal approach challenged this argument. In the ensuing Dáil election on 25 February, a new Government was formed by Fine Gael (70 seats) and Labour (34 seats). The women's branch of the Labour Party support criminalisation of purchase.

In June 2012, the Department of Justice and Equality issued its Discussion Document on Future Direction of Prostitution Legislation. In September 2012, the Oirechtas produced a background document entitled Prostitution regulation in Ireland: which way now? This was followed by a conference in Dublin organised by the Department, to discuss policy alternatives. Following a request by the Minister for Justice and Equality, the Oireachtas Justice Committee held hearings on discussion document between December 2012 and February 2013. Prior to the hearings, a number of the committee members, such as Independent Senator Katherine Zappone, had already committed to a sex purchase ban, and the majority of submissions and presentations supported this measure and were associated with Turn Off the Red Light. In June 2013, it produced a unanimous report recommending reform of Ireland's laws on prostitution, including criminalising purchase, and providing services for those wishing to exit prostitution. Of the opposition parties, both Fianna Fáil (20 seats) and Sinn Féin (14 seats) have expressed support for this approach at their 2013 Ardfheiseanna (party conferences), with the only dissenting voices coming from the independent bloc of deputies in the Dáil. However, there has been a reluctance on the part of the Government to act on the recommendations. A Private Member's Bill was however introduced in the Dáil in March 2013, the Criminal Law (Sexual Offences) (Amendment) Bill 2013, by Independent TD Thomas Pringle which would criminalise the purchase of sex, on behalf of Turn Off the Red Light, which was given a second reading in May 2013, receiving the support of Fianna Fáil and Sinn Féin. The Government preferred to wait for the Justice Committee report, and the bill was defeated on 7 May 2013.

In August 2014, former US President Jimmy Carter wrote to all Irish politicians urging the adoption of the criminalisation of the purchase of sex. Carter had been briefed by the Immigrant Council of Ireland, a leading figure in the Turn Off the Red Light campaign.

In March 2016, the Union of Students’ Ireland (USI) passed a motion to campaign for the decriminalisation of sex workers in Ireland at its 2016 congress.

People Before Profit (PBP) stated in August 2020 that it supports the full decriminalisation of sex work.

== Forms and extent of prostitution ==
There are no up-to-date reliable figures estimating the number of women or men currently working in prostitution in Ireland, but one estimate is 1,000. During Ireland's economic boom male demand for female prostitution services increased. There has been a marked increase in people turning towards the internet and sites as a more effective means of advertising.

For many years prior to the 1993 Sexual Offences Act, most female prostitutes worked on the streets, but, since that time, prostitution rings operating organised escort agencies have become the most prevalent form. Advertising in print publications remains illegal, but a very well-developed Internet advertising medium exists.

Prostitutes of many nationalities now reside in Ireland and Ruhama, an organisation seeking to help women to leave both voluntary and coercive prostitution, reported to the Irish State in 2006 that over 200 women were trafficked by escort agencies into Ireland.

== Advocacy ==
=== Organisations ===
SWAI (Sex Workers Alliance Ireland), is an advocacy group for sex workers in Ireland. It was formed in 2009 by an alliance of individuals and groups to promote the social inclusion, health, safety, civil rights, and the right to self-determination of sex workers. SWAI actively advocates for the decriminalisation of sex work in Ireland and believes sex workers in Ireland should be free to work in safety without fear, judgment or stigma.

Ugly Mugs Ireland is a safety scheme for sex workers established in 2009. It brings sex workers together to share information with each other about potential dangers.

Ruhama (Hebrew: Renewed life), established in 1989, is a Dublin-based NGO operated by the Catholic Sisters of Our Lady of Charity order, which works on a national level with women affected by prostitution and other forms of commercial sexual exploitation. The organisation regards prostitution as violence against women and violations of women's human rights. Ruhama sees prostitution and the social and cultural attitudes which sustain it as being deeply rooted in gender inequality and social marginalisation. Ruhama offers a range of services to support women in and exiting prostitution. Ruhama also seeks to highlight sex trafficking.

=== Campaigns ===
A campaign set up in 2011 to end prostitution and sex trafficking in Ireland called "Turn Off the Red Light" is run by an alliance of more than 66 community, union and religious groups, including the Irish Nurses and Midwives Organisation, and the Irish Medical Organisation. Core members are the Immigrant Council, Ruhama and the National Women's Council.

In response, a counter-campaign called "Turn Off the Blue Light" was created by sex workers and supporters in favour of decriminalisation to rebut what they see as misleading information and to present a positive image of sex workers in Ireland. A chief complaint it has of the "Turn Off The Red Light" campaign is that it conflates legal and consensual sex work with illegal human trafficking.

== In popular culture ==
- "Molly Malone" (also known as "Cockles and Mussels" or "In Dublin's Fair City") is a popular song first published in Boston, Massachusetts in 1876 which tells the fictional tale of a Dublin fishwife who plied her trade on the streets of the city. Although there is no evidence the song is based on a real woman in the 17th century or any other time, Malone is typically represented as being a hawker by day and part-time prostitute by night.
- In the Irish folk song The Peeler and the Goat, a Royal Irish Constabulary officer arrests a she-goat for alleged prostitution in Victorian era Bansha, County Tipperary. Although the peeler self-righteously vows to have the goat transported as a convict to Australia, the goat accuses the peeler of alcoholism, police corruption, and extortion and adds that he is only arresting her because she cannot pay him a bribe of protection money or illegal liquor.
- Chapter II of James Joyce's semi-autobiographical 1916 novel A Portrait of the Artist as a Young Man describes how the main protagonist Stephen Dedalus visits a prostitute one evening after wandering through the "dark slimy streets" of Dublin feeling like a "baffled prowling beast".
- Strumpet City, a 1969 historical novel by James Plunkett set in Dublin around the time of the 1913 Dublin Lock-out.
- The 2000 Irish film à clef When the Sky Falls, which retells a thinly fictionalised version of the 1996 assassination of investigative journalist Veronica Guerin, also depicts a prostitution ring being run by a character based on her confidential source John Traynor.
- The 2005 Irish film Breakfast on Pluto includes a scene where the main character Patrick Braden/Kitten (Cillian Murphy) is forced into prostitution in London.
- In the 2011 Irish buddy cop film The Guard, Garda Siochana Sgt. Gerry Boyle (Brendan Gleeson) is shown having a sexual encounter at a Connemara hotel with two women (played by Sarah Greene and Dominique McElligott) who have arrived at his request from an out of town escort service.

== See also ==
- Monto, the nickname for the one-time red-light district of Dublin.
- Sex workers' rights
- Sex workers' rights movement

== Bibliography ==
- Lyn's Escape, by Lyn Madden, Cork University Press (2007) ISBN 978-1-85594-207-3
- Onthegame.ie Prostitution in Ireland Today, by Stephen Rogers, Gill & Macmillan (2009) ISBN 978-0-7171-4491-4
- Monto: Madams, Murder and Black Coddle, by Terry Fagan and the North Inner City Folklore Project (2000)
- Prostitution and Irish Society, 1800–1940, by Maria Luddy, Cambridge University Press (Nov 2007) ISBN 978-0-521-70905-7
