= Alfie Lambe =

Irish Catholic lay missionary and Servant of God (1932–1959)

Servant of God Alfie Lambe
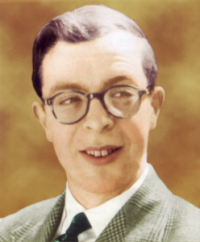
- Born: Alphonsus Lambe; 24 June 1932; Tullamore, County Offaly, Ireland
- Died: 21 January 1959 (aged 26); Buenos Aires, Argentina

Alfie Lambe (in full Alphonsus Lambe; 24 June 1932 – 21 January 1959) was an Irish-born Roman Catholic lay-missionary and envoy of the Legion of Mary to South America.

== Background ==
Born at Tullamore, County Offaly to a farming family, as a youth he considered a vocation with the Irish Christian Brothers but had to leave due to chronic poor health and fainting attacks. Alfie was described as a quiet boy who was shy, loved reading and going on hunting trips with his father. Having to leave the Christian Brothers was devastating for him but he was soon introduced to the Legion of Mary by his brother. Alfie later found work in Dublin and spent time volunteering in the Morning Star hostel.

Frank Duff chose Alfie to become the Legion's envoy to South America. He left Ireland on 16 July 1953 accompanied by Seamus Grace, on their way to Bogotá. He went to serve in Colombia, Ecuador, Uruguay, Brazil, as well as Argentina, where he died in Buenos Aires at age 26 from stomach cancer. He is interred in the vault of the Irish Christian Brothers, in Buenos Aires's Recoleta Cemetery. It is said that his missionary work for the Legion of Mary was greatly helped by his ability to learn languages as he quickly became fluent in both Spanish and Portuguese. He was kidnapped, briefly, but his captors granted him a phone call to prove who he was so he called the Irish Ambassador to vouch for him and this resulted in his release. While in Argentina he also learned Russian with the intention of visiting the Soviet Union but he died before that intention could be realised. On each anniversary of his death there are celebrations throughout South America in his honour by the members of the Legion of Mary.

== Cause of beatification ==
The cause of beatification for Alfie Lambe was introduced by the Archdiocese of Buenos Aires in 1978 and concluded on 26 March 2015. On 17 January 2020 the Ordinary Causes of Congress of the Congregation for the Causes of Saints, Brosel Gavila José Jaime being appointed postulator for the cause to take forward the process of the potential canonization of Alfie Lambe.
