= John Quirke (rugby union) =

Irish rugby union player

- Full name: John Michael Thornton Quirke
- Born: 26 June 1944 (age 82) Dublin, Ireland

Rugby union career
- Position: Scrum-half
International career
Years	Team	Apps	(Points)
1962–68	Ireland	3	(0)

John Michael Thornton Quirke (born 26 June 1944) is an Irish barrister and former international rugby union player of the 1960s. He served as a High Court judge from 1997 to 2012.

Born in Dublin, Quirke was capped three times for Ireland, with his first two appearances coming in 1962 while a Blackrock College schoolboy. He was still only 17 when he was called up to play scrum-half against England at Twickenham, a surprise selection which caused a great deal of media hype in the week leading up to the match. After performing well in a losing cause, Quirke retained his place for the next match against Scotland, before being discarded. He gained his third cap much later, as a stand in for Brendan Sherry in 1968.

== See also ==
- List of Ireland national rugby union players
