= Jules Leman =

French Catholic priest and educator

Father Jules Leman C. S. Sp. (30 June 1826 – 3 June 1880) was a French Roman Catholic priest and schoolmaster who was the founding head of Blackrock College in Ireland.

In the 1870s, Leman successfully promoted the use of a system of funding schools in Ireland which had originated in the West Indies.

== Early life ==
Leman was brought up in Deûlémont, near the Belgian border in the French Nord department, where his father kept a boarding school for young boys. After spending his early years there, he was educated at a lycée in Cambrai. He was ordained as a priest in 1851.

== Career ==
The leader of the Congregation of the Immaculate Heart of Mary, Francis Libermann, appointed Leman as senior scholasticate of the Congregation of the Holy Ghost, in which he served as schoolmaster and as sub-director. In 1858, he was appointed as Director of a new training centre for Brothers at Langonnet in Brittany.

In 1859, the Congregation of the Holy Ghost decided on a station in Ireland to recruit missionaries, and Leman was chosen to lead it. His task was to find young men, preferably studying for the priesthood, to undertake missionary work. He spoke no English, so needed to learn the language.

The Congregation was offered an empty Carmelite convent in Blanchardstown, and Leman and his companions travelled there, arriving on 28 October 1859. They found that the Irish were still recovering from the Great Famine of the late 1840s and fearing another, so had little or no interest in doing anything for African natives. He also found the standard of education in Ireland lower than he had foreseen, so was persuaded that his students must be trained from an early age and that he should establish a school for boys.

Leman had difficulty in finding a place to launch a school, but decided the best location was in Dublin. The Archbishop of Dublin, Paul Cullen, did not altogether welcome foreign congregations being established in Dublin. His diocese lacked the resources for the needs of the poor of Dublin, in view of endemic poverty and the recent famines.

Leman was offered a tenancy of Castledawson House, Blackrock, which had been a Church of Ireland boys’ school. As Blackrock was without a Roman Catholic boys’ school, Archbishop Cullen welcomed the project of a school there, and a lease was entered into on 6 July 1860, the beginning of the future Blackrock College.

Leman used the French educational system, as he had known it in Cambrai and Langonnet. Lacking enough priests to serve as schoolmasters, he hired some laymen.

As time went by, Leman found that the qualifications offered by the Catholic University of Ireland examinations did not give his boys much help in finding jobs. In 1873, he founded a tertiary Civil Service College.

In the 1870s, Leman advocated an educational system for Ireland similar to that then in use in Trinidad. Schools should have internal autonomy and receive public funding based on their results in a shared public examination system. He lobbied the House of Commons for this, and Sir Michael Hicks Beach, Chief Secretary for Ireland, accepted the proposal. Patrick Keenan, Commissioner for National Education, had designed the Trinidad scheme and contacted Leman and his colleague Father Reffé. Keenan planned a new scheme on the Trinidad lines for Ireland, adding some financial prizes for pupils who achieved outstanding results. Parliament accepted the Keenan Scheme in 1878. The new system brought the liberal French curriculum at Blackrock to an end and gave it a narrower programme of studies designed by Keenan.

A shy man, Leman was loved by his boys and widely seen almost as a saint. He died suddenly in 1880, aged 53, and his death was seen as a national disaster.
