= Pauric Sweeney =

Handbag designer

- Born: County Donegal, Ulster, Ireland
- Occupation: Designer

Pauric Sweeney is a luxury handbag designer from Ireland. Sweeney was born in County Donegal in 1973. He has won the London Fashion Week New Generation Award for two consecutive seasons and is noted for his clean and minimalistic lines.

== Early life ==
Sweeney was born in County Donegal in Ulster, and was raised in Falcarragh, a small town in the district of Cloughaneely in the north of County Donegal. He attended Blackrock College in Dublin as a boarder before studying architecture at Temple University in Philadelphia. At Blackrock College, Sweeney was friends with fellow designer Paul Costelloe. Sweeney moved to London in the late 90s where he lived in East London along with other young and new designers such as Hussein Chalayan and Lee Alexander McQueen.

In the 1990s, Sweeney launched a multi-brand designer store and gallery at the fashion cult location called Root at The Old Truman Brewery at Brick Lane to much acclaim.

== Career ==
Sweeney began his fashion career as a jewellery designer in the late 90s, after which he progressed to designing ready-to-wear in 2000. His first collection was titled "Wish U Were Gothic" and was revealed at the Louvre in Paris in 2000.

He debuted his first collection at London Fashion Week in 2001 to much acclaim. His last ready-to-wear collection titled "Succubus" was shown at The Royal Opera House in London, and featured handbags made by the designer. It was then that his friend Suzy Menkes of the International Herald Tribune suggested that he focus his attentions on designing handbags. Pauric Sweeney handbags were launched in 2004 to much anticipation from the fashion world. Since then, he has amassed celebrity fans such as Leigh Lezark, Kate Moss, Liberty Ross, Jennifer Lopez, Agyness Deyn, Alexa Chung, and Coco Rocha amongst many others.

Sweeney opened his flagship store in the posh Mayfair district of London in December 2011. Drawing inspiration from his architecture background, the store was praised as being "a treat for the senses" by Vogue UK. The flagship store is located at 33A Bruton Place, Mayfair, London, W1J 6NP.

Sweeney has worked with Raf Simons as Creative Director of Accessories at Jil Sander. In addition, he has collaborated with Rei Kawakubo of Comme des Garcons, and worked for international department store Lane Crawford. In 2012, Sweeney collaborated with Chilean vineyard Carmen Wines to create a limited edition bag.

Sweeney has been compared to Tom Ford by several magazines because of his impeccable eye for design and quality.

In addition to his new flagship store, Pauric Sweeney's bags also retail at highly prestigious department stores such as Harrods, Selfridges, and Brown Thomas, as well as online via Net-A-Porter and Cocosa, amongst others.

Sweeney now has three lines: Pauric Sweeney (his main exotic-skin line of handbags), Pauric by Pauric (diffusion leather line), and Sweeney (men's line).
