= Edel Quinn =

Irish lay missionary and Catholic venerable

Venerable Edel Quinn
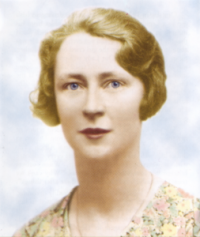
- Portrait of Edel Quinn
- Born: Edel Mary Quinn; 14 September 1907; Castlemagner, County Cork, Ireland
- Died: 12 May 1944 (aged 36); Nairobi, Kenya

Edel Mary Quinn, (14 September 1907 – 12 May 1944) known as Edel Quinn (/iːˈdɛl/) was an Irish-born Roman Catholic lay-missionary and Envoy of the Legion of Mary to East Africa.

== Life ==
Born in Kanturk, County Cork, Edel Mary Quinn was the eldest child of bank official Charles Quinn and Louisa Burke Browne of County Clare. She was a great-granddaughter of William Quinn, a native of County Tyrone who settled in Tuam to build St. Mary's Cathedral.

There is a story that the spelling of her name was inspired by the edelweiss flower. Her parents had intended to name her Adele but the priest who baptized her thought they meant to call her after the flower and baptised her Edelweiss, which was shortened to Edel. However, a query to the Catholic church in Kanturk, County Cork, revealed that she was, in fact, baptised Edel Mary. Her name was entered into the Civil Registers as Edella Mary.

During her childhood, her father's career brought the family to various towns in Ireland, including Tralee, County Kerry, where a plaque was unveiled in May 2009 at Bank of Ireland House in Denny Street commemorating her residence there between 1921 and 1924. Quinn attended the Presentation Convent in the town between 1921 and 1925.

Quinn felt a call to religious life at a young age. She wished to join the Poor Clares but was prevented by advanced tuberculosis. After spending eighteen months in a sanatorium, her condition unchanged, she decided to become active in the Legion of Mary, which she joined in Dublin at age 20. She gave herself completely to its work in the form of helping the poor in the slums of Dublin.

In 1936, at age 29 and dying of tuberculosis, Quinn became a Legion of Mary Envoy, a very active missionary to East and Central Africa, departing in December 1936 for Mombasa. Quinn settled in Nairobi having been told by Bishop Heffernan that this was the most convenient base for her work. By the outbreak of World War II, she was working as far off as Dar es Salaam and Mauritius. In 1941, she was admitted to a sanatorium near Johannesburg. Fighting her illness, in seven and a half years she established hundreds of Legion branches and councils in today's Tanzania, Kenya, Uganda, Malawi, and Mauritius. J.J. McCarthy, later Bishop of Zanzibar and Archbishop of Nairobi, wrote of her:

- "Miss Quinn is an extraordinary individual; courageous, zealous and optimistic. She wanders around in a dilapidated Ford, having for sole companion an African driver. When she returns home she will be qualified to speak about the Missions and Missionaries, having really more experience than any single Missionary I know."

All this time her health was never good, and in 1943 she took a turn for the worse, dying in Nairobi, Kenya of tuberculosis on 12 May 1944. She is buried there in the Missionaries' Cemetery.

== Cause of beatification and canonization ==
The cause for her beatification was introduced in 1957. She was declared venerable by Pope John Paul II on 15 December 1994, since when the campaign for her beatification has continued.
