= Ronald Hogan =

Scottish cricketer

Personal information
- Full name: Charles Ronald Hogan
- Born: 10 January 1939 (age 87); Paisley, Renfrewshire, Scotland
- Batting: Right-handed
- Bowling: Right-arm fast-medium

Domestic team information
- Years: Team
- 1962–1964: Scotland

Career statistics
Competition	First-class
Matches	6
Runs scored	25
Batting average	4.16
100s/50s	–/–
Top score	7
Balls bowled	1,070
Wickets	24
Bowling average	17.29
5 wickets in innings	2
10 wickets in match	–
Best bowling	6/36
Catches/stumpings	2/–
- Source: Cricinfo, 30 June 2022

Charles Ronald Hogan (born 10 January 1939) is a Scottish former first-class cricketer.

Hogan was born at Paisley in January 1939. A club cricketer for Ferguslie Cricket Club, Hogan made his debut for Scotland in first-class cricket against Ireland at Greenock in 1962. He played first-class cricket for Scotland a further five times, with his final appearance coming in 1964 on Scotland's tour of England against Warwickshire at Edgbaston. Playing in the Scottish side as a right-arm fast-medium bowler, he took 24 wickets at an average of 17.29; he took a five wicket haul on two occasions, both in 1963 with 5 for 48 against the Marylebone Cricket Club, and 6 for 36 against Ireland. As a lower order batsman, he scored 25 runs with a highest score of 7.
