= Legion of Mary =

International association of members of the Roman Catholic Church

- Legio Mariae
- Vexillium Legionis
- Abbreviation: LOM, Legionis
- Formation: 7 September 1921; 104 years ago
- Founder: Servant of God Frank Duff
- Type: Catholic lay society Marian devotional society
- Headquarters: Dublin, Ireland
- Official language: English and Ecclesiastical Latin
- Key people: Servant of God Alfie Lambe- Missionary to South America; Venerable Edel Quinn- Missionary to East Africa
- Website: legionofmary.ie

The Legion of Mary (Latin: Legio Mariae, postnominal abbreviation L.O.M.) is an international association of members of the Catholic Church who serve on a voluntary basis. It was founded in Dublin, as a Marian movement by the layman and civil servant Frank Duff.

Today, active and auxiliary (praying) members make up a total of over 10 million members worldwide, making it the largest apostolic organization of laypeople in the Catholic Church.

Membership is highest in South Korea, Philippines, Brazil, Argentina and the Democratic Republic of Congo, which each have between 250,000 and 500,000 members.

Membership is open to believing members of the Catholic Church. Its stated mission is for active members to serve God under the banner of Mary through the corporal and spiritual works of Mercy, as mentioned in Chapter 33 of the Legion of Mary Handbook. The main apostolate of the Legion is activities directed towards Catholics and non-Catholics alike, either by encouraging them in their faith or inviting them to become Catholic. This is usually done by supporting them in prayer, attending Mass and learning more about the Catholic faith. Members of the Legion are engaged primarily in spiritual works of mercy, rather than works of material aid.

== History ==
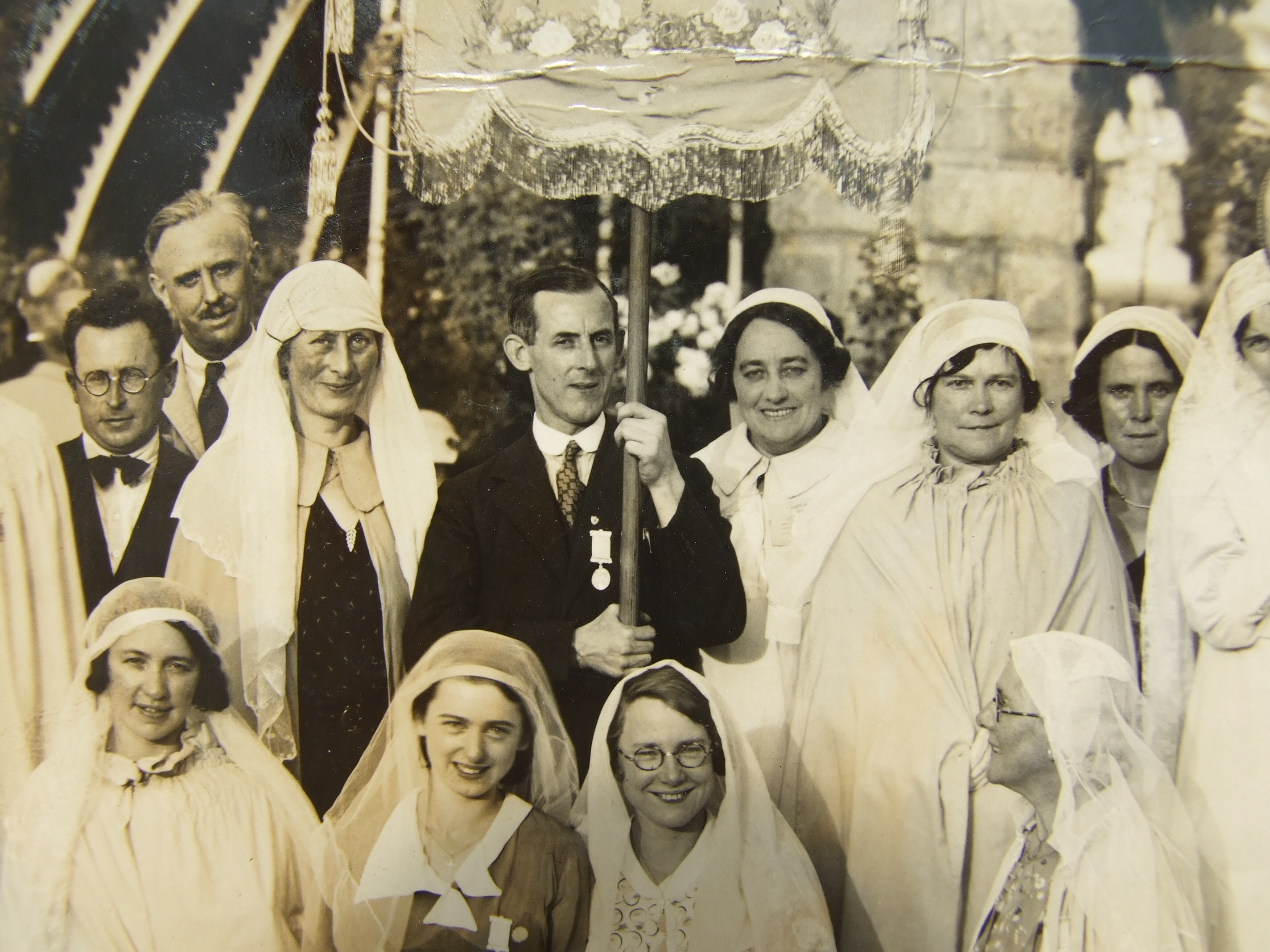
Members of the Legion of Mary, including founder Frank Duff, in 1934

The Legion of Mary was founded by Frank Duff on 7 September 1921 at Myra House, Francis Street, Dublin. His idea was to help Catholic lay people fulfil their baptismal promises to be able to live their dedication to the Church in an organized structure, which would be supported by fraternity and prayer. The Legion draws its inspiration from Louis de Montfort's book True Devotion to Mary.

The Legion first started out by visiting women with cancer in hospitals, but it soon became active among the most destitute. Most notably, the Legion began helping Dublin’s prostitutes in the Monto, the largest red light district in Europe at the time, to run away from their "kip-keepers" and start new lives. Duff also set up a similar refuge for unwed mothers, but defied the usual consensus in Ireland at the time by teaching the women how to raise their children instead of giving the babies away for adoption. He subsequently laid down the system of the Legion in the Handbook of the Legion of Mary in 1928 the complied activities of the legion.

The Legion soon spread around the world. At first, it was often met with mistrust because of its then-unusual dedication to lay apostolate. After Pope Pius XI praised it in 1931, the Legion had its mistrust quelled.

Most prominent among those who spread the Legion are Edel Quinn (1907-1944) for her activities in Africa in the 1930s and the 1940s. Her dedication to the mission of the Legion, despite her ill health (tuberculosis) brought her admiration: her beatification process is currently underway, as well as for Duff and Alfie Lambe (1932–1959), Legion Envoy to South America.

On 27 March 2014, the Secretary of the Pontifical Council for the Laity, Bishop Josef Clemens, delivered the decree in which the Legion is recognized by the Holy See as International Association of the Faithful.

In 2021, the Legion celebrated the centennial of its founding amidst the COVID-19 pandemic, by hosting virtual talks, devotions, and masses. The group also resolved to increase its membership and engagement among young people and to pray for the beatification of Servants of God Frank Duff, Alphonsus Lambe, and Venerable Edel Quin.

== Structure ==
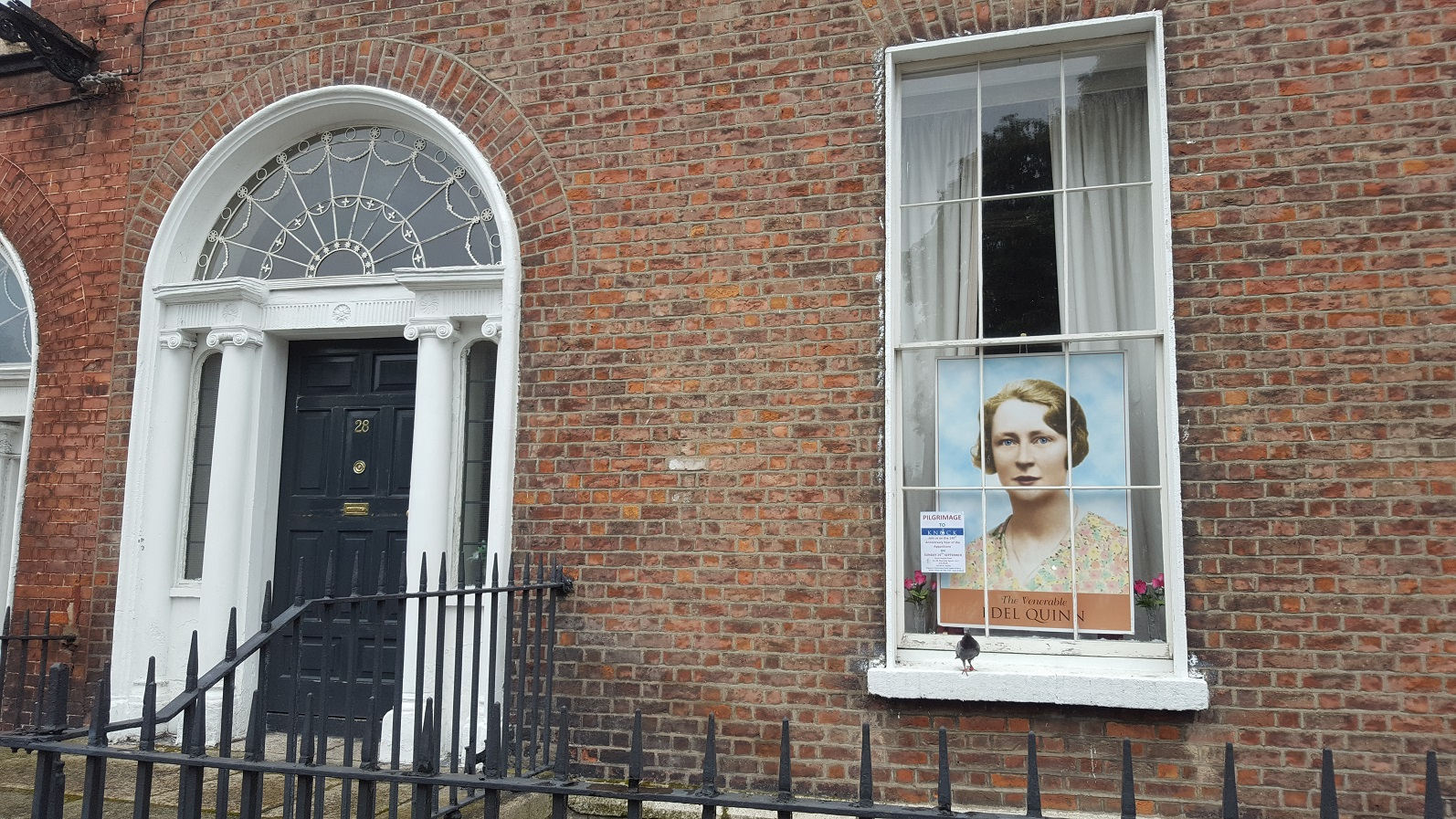
St Therese’s Club, Mountjoy Square

The basic unit of the Legion is called a Praesidium, which is normally based in a parish. The Praesidium, usually a group of 3–20 members, meets weekly in its parish. A Curia is the next level above, handling several Praesidia.

The next level is the Comitium, which is in charge of several Curiae, usually over an area like a medium city or part of a province. Above it is the Regia, which is in charge of larger territories like a province or state. The Senatus is the next level, and generally governs the Regiae in a very large area, usually a country or a very large territory: for example, the Senatus of Uganda manages the Legion in the whole of Uganda.

The Concilium is the highest governing level and controls the entire Legion worldwide from its seat in Dublin.

Each level of the Legion has the same set of officers: the President, the Vice-President, the Secretary, the Treasurer, and the Spiritual Director. The last is always from the clergy, but all other offices are held by the laity. All positions regardless of responsibility are voluntary and the Legion has no paid workers.

== Membership ==
=== Entering and leaving ===
Membership is open to all baptized Catholics. After visiting a Praesidium a few times, one can join the Legion as a probationary member for three months. Then, a decision is made on whether one is to join the Legion as an active member permanently. During the probationary period, probationary members learn about the Legion system by reading the Handbook of the Legion of Mary and its active works by listening to reports of such undertaking by fellow Legionaries. At the end of probationary period, members swear the "Legion promise", a pledge of allegiance to the Holy Spirit and to Mary, and become permanent active members.

Membership in the Legion of Mary is essentially based on discipline and commitment. Members devote their time and prayer for intentions through the intercession of Mary, Mother of Jesus.

Members can withdraw from the Legion by informing the president of his or her Praesidium.

=== Types of membership ===
The Legion of Mary consists of two totally different memberships: the active and the auxiliary members. Both are essential to the Legion: "Just as a bird cannot fly without one wing, so also the Legion cannot exist without any of the other members," said Ráinel Lobo of Mumbai, India.

Active members regularly attend weekly sessions of their Praesidium and pray daily the Catena Legionis, which consists essentially of the Magnificat and some shorter prayers. Their main role lies in active apostolate for the Legion and the wider Church. Active members under 18 are not allowed to give the "Legion promise" until that age. They are considered Juniors and may hold any office except President in their Praesidium. Above the level of the Praesidium, no Junior may serve as an officer.

Auxiliary members support the Legion through their prayer. They pray the whole booklet of Legion prayers, the Tessera, every day. The Tessera consists of an Invocation, prayers to the Holy Spirit, the Rosary, the Catena Legionis, and concluding prayers.

Praetorians are a higher grade of active membership, who pray, in addition to their duties as active members, the Rosary, the Divine Office and attend Holy Mass daily.

Adjutorians are a higher grade of auxiliary membership. Like Praetorians, they additionally pray the Divine Office and attend Holy Mass daily.

Praetorians and Adjutors do not have a higher status or higher rank inside the Legion system. The meaning of the grades is only a desire for a more devotional life, not for higher status. Entering these grades is done by registering with a list of Praetorians/Adjutors and by subsequently observing their duties.

== Meetings ==
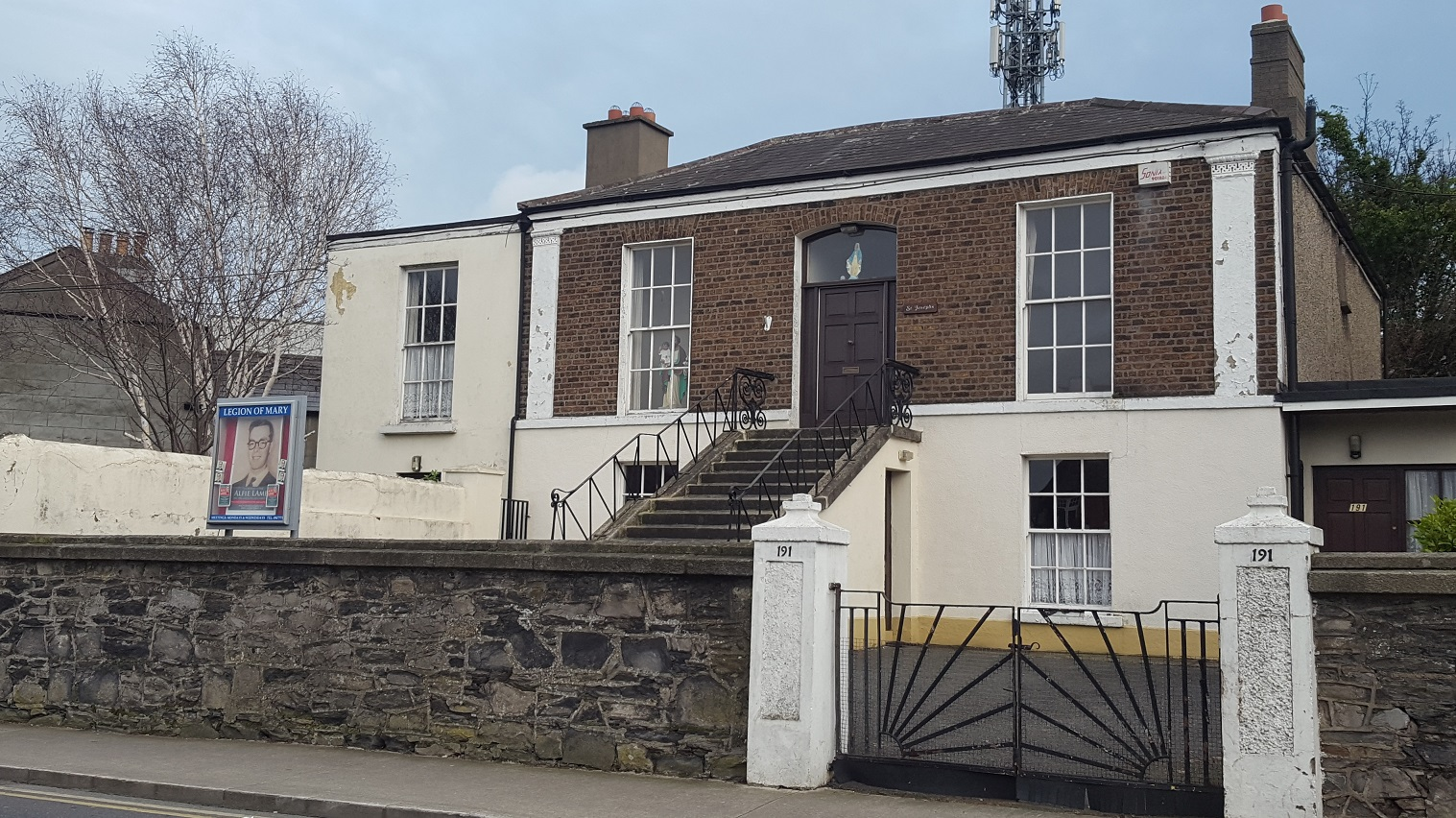
St. Joseph's Legion House, Legion of Mary, 191 Rathgar Road, Rathmines

The Praesidia normally meet weekly; larger entities normally monthly or more rarely.

In all sessions, an Altar of the Legion is set up. It has a statue of the Virgin Mary (represented as standing on a globe, her arms extended, crushing the serpent with her foot), which is placed upon a white tablecloth with "Legio Mariae" written on it. On each side of the statue are placed two vases with flowers, often roses (a flower symbolising Mary). On the front ends of the cloth are two candlesticks with burning candles. To the right side of Mary is placed the Vexillum Legionis.

During meetings, the prayers of the Tessera are said in full. Sessions begin with introductory prayers to the Holy Spirit and to Mary, including five decades of the Rosary. The next part of the session includes a spiritual reading and administrative matters. Members tell briefly how they fulfilled tasks assigned to them at the previous session. They also discuss and/or read a chapter from the Handbook of the Legion. Then, the Catena Legionis is prayed, and the Spiritual Director (or, if absent, the President), preaches a short sermon on spiritual matters (allocutio). Finally, new tasks for Legionaires are distributed. Each meeting ends with concluding prayers of the Tessera, and a prayer for Duff's beatification.

== Vexillum Legionis ==
The Vexillum Legionis (English: Standard of the Legion) is placed on the Altar of the Legion at every meeting. The vexillum is made of metal and shows the Holy Spirit in the form of a dove, as well as the Miraculous Medal. The staff is then set on an onyx globe which, for use on a table, stands on a square base. The whole design conveys the idea that the world is to be conquered by the Holy Spirit acting through Mary and her children.

== Spirituality ==
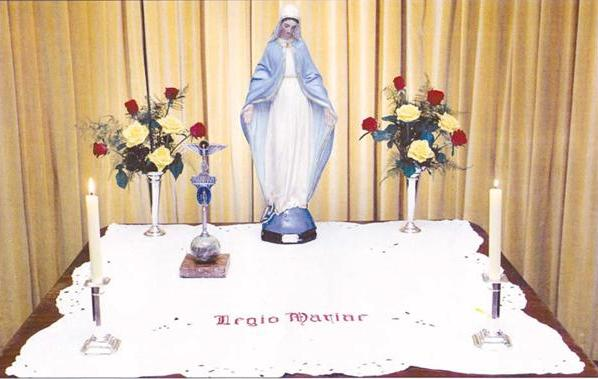
Altar of the Legion

The spirituality of the Legion of Mary is essentially based on the approach of Louis de Montfort, as put forward in his True Devotion to Mary. The book promotes a "total dedication" to Christ through devotion to the Blessed Virgin Mary, which later influenced popes such as John Paul II, who mentions it in an apostolic letter, Rosarium Virginis Mariae.

Another important element that shapes its spirituality is Duff's devotion to the Holy Spirit. He promoted the adoration of the third person of the Trinity, which he considered neglected. He saw the Virgin Mary as the "visible image" of the Spirit; the Legion's introductory prayers and the Legion promise are directed to the Holy Spirit. The Legion's Vexillum Legionis is topped by the Holy Spirit in the form of a dove.

The essential aim of the Legion of Mary is the sanctification of its members through prayer, the sacraments and devotion to Mary and the Trinity, and of the whole world through the apostolate of the Legion.

The idea of a Catholic lay apostolate organization where ordinary laypeople in all situations of life would work towards personal sanctification and for the conversion of the world was the first of its kind. After the Second Vatican Council (1962–65) promoted such ideas in its conciliar documents, this approach gained wider acceptance in the Catholic Church.

== See also ==
- Frank Duff
- Alfie Lambe
- Edel Quinn
- Laureana Franco
- Blue Army of Our Lady of Fátima
- Veronica O'Brien
