= Frank Duff =

Founder of the Legion of Mary and Servant of God

Servant of God Frank Duff
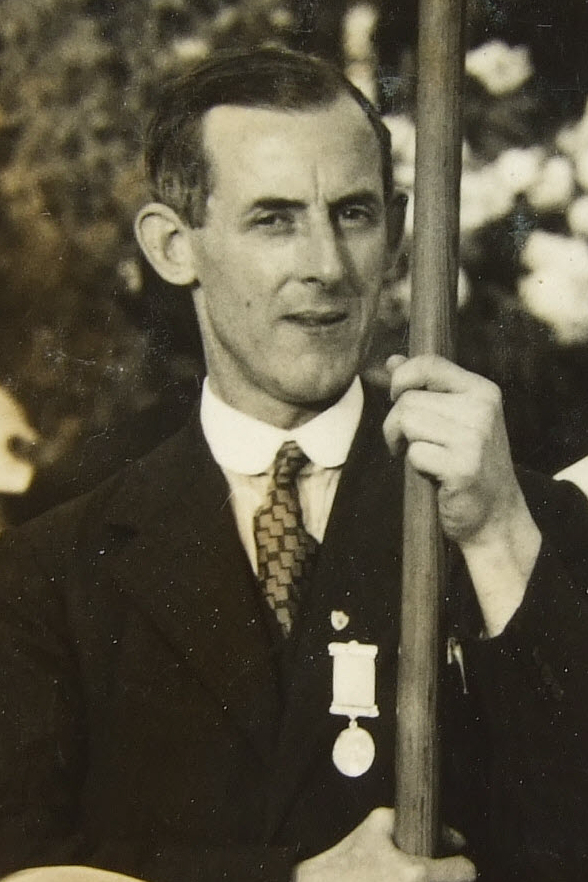
- Frank Duff in 1934
- Born: Francis Michael Duff; 7 June 1889; Dublin, Ireland
- Died: 7 November 1980 (aged 91); Dublin, Ireland
- Venerated in: Catholic Church

Francis Michael Duff (7 June 1889 – 7 November 1980), was an Irish lay Catholic and author known for bringing attention to the role of the Catholic laity during the Second Vatican Council of the Catholic Church. Duff had previously founded the Legion of Mary in his native city of Dublin, Ireland.

== Biography ==
=== Early life ===
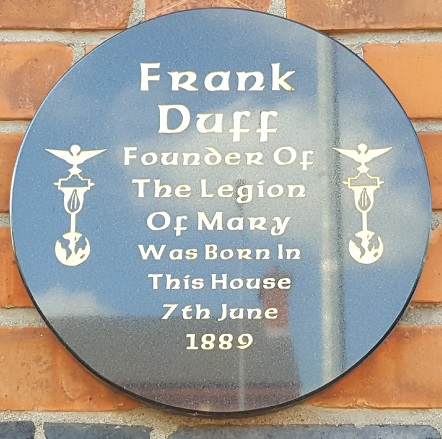
Birthplace at 97 Phibsboro Road

He was born in Dublin on 7 June 1889, at 97 Phibsboro Road, the eldest of seven children of John Duff (died 23 December 1918) and his wife, Susan Letitia (née Freehill, died 27 February 1950). The wealthy family lived in the city at St Patrick's Road, Drumcondra. Duff attended Blackrock College.

=== Early career ===
In 1908, he entered the Civil Service and was assigned to the Irish Land Commission. In 1913, he joined the Society of St Vincent de Paul and was exposed to the real poverty of Dublin. Many who lived in tenement squalor were forced to attend soup kitchens for sustenance, and abject poverty, alcoholism, street gangs, and organized prostitution were rife in parts of Dublin. Duff joined and soon rose through the ranks to become President of the Saint Patrick's Conference at Saint Nicholas of Myra Parish. Duff, having concern for people he saw as materially and spiritually deprived, had the idea to picket Protestant soup kitchens as he considered they were giving aid in the form of food and free accommodation at hostels, in return for not attending Catholic services. Duff set up rival Catholic soup kitchens and, with his friend, Sergeant Major Joe Gabbett, who had already been working at discouraging Catholics from patronizing Protestant soup kitchens. They succeeded in closing down two of them over the years.

In 1916, Duff published his first pamphlet, Can we be Saints? where he expressed the conviction that all are called to be saints without exception, and that through Christian faith, all have the means necessary.

In 1918, a friend gifted Duff a copy of the book True Devotion to Mary by the seventeenth-century French cleric Louis de Montfort, which influenced his views on Mary. Duff was additionally influenced by the writings of John Henry Newman.

He briefly acted as private secretary to Michael Collins, then-Chairman of the Provisional Government and commander-in-chief of the National Army. In 1924, he was transferred to the Department of Finance.

=== Legion of Mary ===
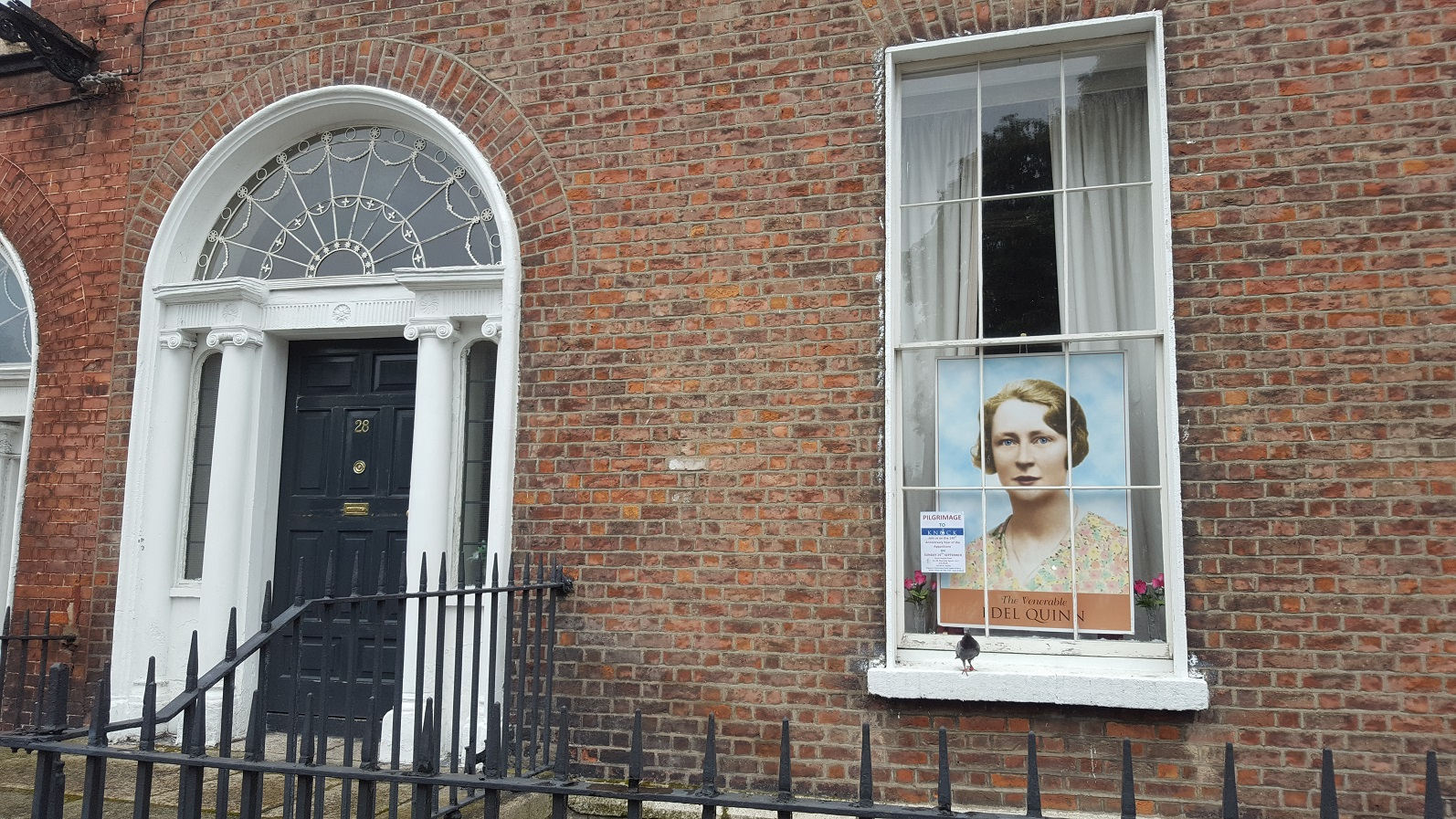
St Therese's Club, Mountjoy Square

On 7 September 1921 Duff was a part of a meeting alongside Fr Michael Toher and fifteen women which became the nucleus of what would become the Legion of Mary. The Legion of Mary was created to organise lay Catholics to perform voluntary work. Duff modelled the organisation on Roman legions. Some of the first causes the Legion pursued was to become involved with homelessness and prostitution in Dublin city. In 1922, Duff defied the wishes of the Archbishop of Dublin and the widespread Crypto-Calvinism, or Jansenism, within the Catholic Church in Ireland, which had created an intense hostility towards both prostitutes and other allegedly "fallen women". Similarly to St. Vitalis of Gaza before him, Duff began an outreach to the prostitutes living in often brutal and inhuman conditions in the "kip houses" of "the Monto", as Dublin's red-light district, one of the largest in Europe at the time, was then called. In the introduction to Kevin G. Kearns' Dublin Tenement Life: An Oral History, he comments that many of the prostitutes in the Monto were, like Philomena Lee, unwed mothers who had been disowned both by their families and by their babies' fathers. Although middle-class Dubliners dismissively viewed these women as 'whores', the impoverished but devoutly Catholic residents of the Monto tenements referred to local prostitutes as "unfortunate girls", and understood that they had often turned to prostitution as a last resort. According to Kearns, "By all accounts, the girls were typically young, attractive, and known for their generosity, especially to slum children". As part of his work, Duff established the Sancta Maria hostel, a safe house for former prostitutes whom the Legion had reached out to and persuaded to run away from their "kip keepers". Following the Irish War of Independence and Civil War, Duff also persuaded the first Catholic Commissioner of the Dublin Metropolitan Police, former Irish Army General W. R. E. Murphy, to launch a crack down and, even though Prostitution in the Republic of Ireland, rooted in human trafficking, still exists, the closure of the Monto's last "Kip-Houses" was announced on 12 March 1925.

In 1927 Duff established the Morning Star hostel for homeless men, followed shortly by the Regina Coeli hostel for homeless women in 1930. Unlike the Magdalen Asylums formed the same purpose, the Regina Coeli hostel reflected Duff's view that unwed mothers should be taught how to be able to provide for and raise their children. This defied the unwritten rules of an era which held that the children of unwed mothers deserved to be saved from growing up with the stigma of their illegitimacy by being put up for adoption as quickly as possible.

While Duff enjoyed the support of WT Cosgrave, Ireland's head of government, and in May 1931 Duff was granted an audience with Pope Pius XI, his efforts were opposed internally in the Dublin diocese. The Archbishop of Dublin Edward Joseph Byrne and his successor John Charles McQuaid sought to censor Duff because of the Legion's involvement with the rehabilitation of former prostitutes. McQuaid also did not approve of Duff's interdenominational and inter-religious activities; in the 1930s and 1940s, Duff created the Mercier Society, a study group designed to bring together Catholics and Protestants, as well as the Pillar of Fire, a group designed to promote dialogue between Irish Catholics with Ireland's Jewish community. In communication with banned Irish writers Sean O'Faolain and Peadar O'Donnell, Duff suggested he was far more censored than even they were.

Duff did have some supporters amongst the Catholic hierarchy though; with the backing of Cardinal Joseph MacRory and Francis Bourne of Westminster, the Legion was able to expand rapidly and internationally. In 1928 the Legion established its first praesidium (branch) within the Catholic Church in Scotland. Duff was able to use the occasion of the 1932 Eucharistic Congress as a means to introduce the Legion of Mary to visiting foreign bishops, leading to even further international growth.

He retired from the Civil Service in 1934 to devote all of his time to the Legion of Mary.

In July 1940, an overseas club for African and Asian students studying in Dublin was also created. At that time Ireland was a popular destination for students from Asia and Africa because of its anti-colonialist cultural orientation based on centuries of Irish history. Duff personally funded the purchase of a building for the club using funds from an inheritance. The club lasted until 1976 and would facilitate many notable students, including Jaja Wachuku.

For the rest of his life, with the help of many others, Duff guided the Legion's worldwide extension.

=== Later life ===
In 1965, Pope Paul VI invited Duff to attend the Second Vatican Council as a lay observer. When Duff was introduced to the assembly by Archbishop John Heenan of Liverpool, he received a standing ovation.

Duff made the promotion of devotion to the Sacred Heart of Jesus part of the Legion's apostolate.

== Death and veneration ==
Duff died at 91 on 7 November 1980 in Dublin and was interred in Glasnevin Cemetery.

Today, the Legion of Mary has an estimated four million active members and 10 million auxiliary members in close to 200 countries in almost every diocese in the Catholic Church.

In July 1996, the cause of Frank Duff's beatification was introduced by Cardinal Desmond Connell.

== Works ==
- Can We Be Saints? Reprinted 1998
- Duff, Frank (1956). "Walking with Mary (The spirit of the Legion of Mary)". Glasgow: Glasgow, J.S. Burns. ASIN B0007IXKU2.
