= Book censorship in the Republic of Ireland =

Book censorship was carried out in several instances in Ireland between 1929 and 1998, with all remaining bans from that period having expired by 2010. However, the laws remained on the statute books and a book was banned again in 2016. Censorship was enacted by a 1929 act of the Irish Free State.

== History ==
Following the creation of the Irish Free State in 1922, a Committee on Evil Literature was appointed in 1926, reporting to the Department of Justice. The Censorship of Publications Acts of 1929 followed, and established the Censorship of Publications Board. Books could be banned that were considered to be indecent or obscene, as could newspapers whose content relied too much on crime, and works that promoted the "unnatural" prevention of conception or that advocated abortion. Ireland's culture at the time was strictly religious. Roman Catholicism —then the religion of 93% of the population — was the fundamental philosophy behind the censorship laws. In 1933, President Éamon de Valera felt that the arts in Ireland were to be encouraged when they observed the "holiest traditions", but should be censored when they failed to live up to this ideal.

Among the first 13 books to be banned (announced in the Iris Oifigiúil, in May 1930) were Point Counter Point by Aldous Huxley, The Well of Loneliness by Radclyffe Hall and several books on sex and marriage by Margaret Sanger and Marie Stopes. From 1930 onwards, many books of undoubted literary merit, as well as serious books on reproductive issues and sexual health, were banned. Banned books were listed in the Government publication Iris Oifigiúil, and the list, or a selection, was usually published in the Irish Times. Among Irish books or authors whose book(s) were banned were Liam O'Flaherty (1930), Seán Ó Faoláin (1932), Francis Stuart (1939), Oliver St. John Gogarty (1942), The Tailor and Ansty by Eric Cross (1942), The Gadfly by Ethel Lilian Voynich (1947), Maura Laverty (1948), Walter Macken (1948), Frank O'Connor (1951), Sam Hanna Bell (1952), Brian Cleeve (1952), Benedict Kiely (1954).

The Censorship of Publications Act, 1967, limited the period of prohibition orders of books to twelve years (although books released after this period could be banned again by the Board). The act thus allowed the immediate sale of over 5,000 previously banned books.

Strict censorship has since ceased, and virtually all books banned have been unbanned. A 2007 era listing of banned books showed that none had been banned since 1998.

Contrary to popular belief, James Joyce's Ulysses was technically never banned in Ireland; however, this was because it was never imported and offered for sale, for fear of such a ban and its attendant costs. In 1942, Senator Sir John Keane told the Seanad that 1,600 books had been banned since independence in 1922. He quoted examples of supposed indecency from several books to ridicule the law; prudishly, his extracts were not reported verbatim, but as: "[The Senator quoted from the book.]".

Books containing references to terrorism or which could be considered slander under Irish law can still be banned – one will not be prosecuted for owning or importing them, but their sale is prohibited. This covers books such as The Committee: Political Assassination in Northern Ireland, which has even been pulled from Amazon.com due to its content. However, importing this book and its sale second-hand are still legal.

There are instances of books which were at one time banned in Ireland subsequently not only having the ban overturned but the books in question becoming required reading on the Leaving Certificate syllabus, e.g., Salinger's Catcher in the Rye (banned in October 1951).

The Catholic Index was underpinned by Canon law until it was abolished in 1966. Thereafter Irish censorship of books declined markedly.

In 2010, it was announced that, as the last book had been banned in 1998, no books were currently banned in Ireland as the 12-year limitation had run out on all existing bans.

In March 2016, the Irish Censorship board issued its first ban in 18 years. The book The Raped Little Runaway by Jean Martin was deemed "indecent or obscene" by the board. Justifying its decision, the board pointed to the several instances of rape of a minor in the book.

== List of banned books ==
Some of the banned books include:

Title	Author	Type	Notes
Droll Stories (1832–37)	Honoré de Balzac		Banned for obscene material of a sexual nature in 1953, but lifted 1967.
Brave New World (1932)	Aldous Huxley	Novel	Banned in Ireland in 1932, due to alleged references of sexual promiscuity.
Catcher in the Rye (1951)	J. D. Salinger	Novel	Banned in October 1951.
Borstal Boy (1958)	Brendan Behan	Autobiographical Novel	Banned in 1958. The Irish Censorship of Publications Board was not obliged to reveal its reason but it is believed that it was rejected for its critique of Irish republicanism and the Catholic Church, and its depiction of adolescent sexuality.
The Country Girls (1960)	Edna O'Brien	Novel	Banned by Ireland's censorship board in 1960 for its explicit sexual content.
The Lonely Girl (1962)	Edna O'Brien	Novel	Banned in 1962 after Archbishop John Charles McQuaid complained personally to Justice Minister Charles Haughey that it "was particularly bad".

== See also ==
- Censorship in the Republic of Ireland
- List of books banned by governments
