= Censorship in the Republic of Ireland =

In Ireland, the state retains laws that allow for censorship, including specific laws covering films, advertisements, newspapers and magazines, as well as terrorism and pornography, among others. In the early years of the state, censorship was more widely enforced, particularly in areas that were perceived to be in contradiction of Catholic dogma, including abortion, sexuality and homosexuality. The church had banned many books and theories for centuries, listed in the Index Librorum Prohibitorum.

== Overview ==
Freedom of speech is protected by Article 40.6.1 of the Irish constitution, which says "The right of the citizens to express freely their convictions and opinions" . However the article qualifies this right, providing that it may not be used to undermine "public order or morality or the authority of the State". Furthermore, the constitution explicitly requires that the publication of "seditious, or indecent matter" be a criminal offence. The scope of the protection afforded by this Article has been interpreted restrictively by the judiciary, largely as a result of the wording of the Article, which qualifies the right before articulating it. Indeed, until an authoritative pronouncement on the issue by the Supreme Court, many believed that the protection was restricted to "convictions and opinions" and, as a result, a separate right to communicate was, by necessity, implied into Article 40.3.2.

Under the European Convention on Human Rights Act 2003, all of the rights afforded by the European Convention serve as a guideline for the judiciary to act upon. The act is subordinate to the constitution.

Censorship in the country is primarily managed by three bodies; the Censorship of Publications Board which deals with written media like newspapers, magazines and books (an agency of the Department of Justice, Home Affairs and Migration); the Irish Film Classification Office which deals with film, video and occasionally computer games (also an agency of the Department of Justice, Home Affairs and Migration); and the broadcasting regulator Coimisiún na Meán which deals with electronic media like radio, television and the internet (an agency of the Department of Culture, Communications and Sport).

Due to the country's geographic and cultural closeness to the United Kingdom, Ireland has considerable strong access to the British media. This is especially true in broadcasting media which easily spills over to Ireland, which enables many in the country to watch or listen many major British broadcasters like the BBC and ITV. In due course, regulations regarding censorship in the UK are indirectly enabled in Ireland.

In terms of press freedom, Ireland is noted highly on the Press Freedom Index. The country is ranked Good over the last five years, and is currently in 2024 ranked eighth.

== Current censorship ==
=== Film ===
The Irish Film Classification Office, previously known as the Irish Film Censors Office until 2008, heavily cut films and videos for rental release, or placed high age ratings on them. In 2000 The Cider House Rules received an 18 certificate in Ireland due to its themes of abortion and incest, although in other countries, such as the UK, the film received a 12 certificate.

=== Advertisements ===
Advertisements are regulated by the Advertising Standards Authority, and must be truthful and factually accurate. In addition, adverts for illegal services are not allowed. The ASA is a voluntary industry body which has no statutory powers and has no power to remove a publication from circulation. This power is vested in the Censorship of Publications Board. Given the status of the ASA some advertisers choose to continually ignore its rulings by running controversial advertisements purely to draw attention to their products and services.

=== Newspapers, magazines and news websites ===
Whilst still theoretically censorable, newspapers and magazines are free to publish anything which does not break Ireland's tough libel or contempt of court laws. The Censorship of Publications Board reviews newspapers and magazines referred to it by the Revenue Commissioners and by members of the public. Until the late 1980s a large number of (mainly foreign) newspaper and magazines were banned in Ireland including Playboy and the News of the World. Playboy's ban was lifted in 1995, while on the other hand the British edition of the News of the World was still, theoretically, banned when it ceased publication in 2011. Similarly, the news website The Journal regularly prevents public commenters from commenting in ongoing court cases, as they may break the country's strict contempt of court laws.

The listing of periodicals under permanent banning orders as of 2007 includes many publications which have ceased to be published, as well as ones which are now sold freely without any realistic chance of prosecution, such as naturist magazine Health and Efficiency. A large proportion of the banning orders date from the 1950s or before; and a similar proportion cover true crime publications, a type which were once illegal due to a perceived risk of glorifying or encouraging criminal behaviour. In 2011, softcore pornographic magazine publisher Paul Raymond Publications successfully appealed against the ban on five of their publications; Mayfair, Escort, Club International, Razzle and Men Only, one of which, Razzle has been banned since 1935, and these publications can now be freely sold.

The press in Ireland is however self-regulated by its own ombudsman, the Press Council of Ireland. The Press Council is a voluntary industry body, that regulates all major newspapers, magazines and news websites. However, it has no statutory powers and has no power to remove a publication from circulation.

=== Pornography ===
Pornography that includes any participants being beneath the Irish age of consent [which is 17 years old] is strictly illegal. This includes videos, DVD, film, photographs, digital files, drawings and text descriptions. There are no other laws banning specific types of pornography in Ireland. However, distribution of obscene material by the telephone network can be prosecuted under the Post Office (Amendment) Act of 1951, the Director of Film Classification at the Irish Film Classification Office may ban public display of films considered to be obscene, and the Censorship of Publications Board may prohibit the sale and distribution of books and periodicals if they are found to be obscene. In the 1960s, Roman Catholic Archbishop of Dublin John Charles McQuaid lobbied the Irish government to have pornography banned outright.

The government-controlled IE Domain Registry currently has a ban on all domain names it considers "offensive or contrary to public policy or generally accepted principles of morality". In particular, the domains pornography.ie and porn.ie are known to be banned.

=== Music ===
In general, music is not censored in Ireland although broadcasters follow the ombudsman Coimisiún na Meán broadcasting rules regarding language and suitability when broadcasting on the radio. For example, in 2017 radio station RTÉ Raidió na Gaeltachta removed the track "C.E.A.R.T.A" by the Belfast Irish language rap group Kneecap from an afternoon programme's playlist due to the song's "drug references and cursing".

In the past, references to records or songs being "banned" in Ireland refer to one or more radio stations refusing to play the songs rather than any legislative ban, although before 1989 it may have been a moot point given that the only legal broadcasting stations in Ireland were those operated by state broadcaster RTÉ. In the 1930s there was even a short-lived airplay ban on an entire genre of music known as the "ban on Jazz" (with an exceptionally wide definition of what constituted "jazz"). Such bans only served to further increase listenership to foreign radio stations (such as Radio Luxembourg and the BBC) in Ireland, and led to the growth of Irish pirate radio.

The song "They Never Came Home" on the album Ordinary Man by Christy Moore which was released in 1984, was banned on grounds of contempt of court by a judge of the High Court on 9 August 1985. It wasn't overturned until the album was re-released by his record company in 2004.

In 2003, the Irish national carrier Aer Lingus dropped a playlist of Irish rebel songs that was offered for its passengers, after a complaint from the UUP politician Roy Beggs, saying it was offensive to Northern Irish unionists.

=== Books ===
Like magazines and newspapers, books can be banned by the Censorship of Publications Board which can ban publications based on obscenity or indecency. The most notable ban was the novel The Tailor and Ansty by the author Eric Cross which was questioned in the Seanad by senator Sir John Keane on its banning in 1942. Book bans were significantly reduced when the authority of the Index Librorum Prohibitorum was abolished in 1966. A year later, the ban was changed so it only lasted twelve years instead of indefinitely, although it could be renewed. In 2010, the last series of book bans were finished as the previously bans have completed their twelve-year limitation. Since March 2016 the Censorship of Publications Board has issued a book ban for The Raped Little Runaway by Jean Martin due to repeat references of raping a ten-year-old minor. In February 2017, a man from County Clare was charged with possession of book in question, making the first such charge in twenty years.

While Irish novel Ulysses was censored in the U.S. between 1921 and 1934, and the UK between 1922 and 1936, the Censorship of Publications Board never banned it. When the British government in 1985 censored the publication of the memoirs of the MI5 spy Peter Wright in Spycatcher on the grounds of national security, it was not applicable in Ireland and the controversy made the book a bestseller.

=== Radio and television broadcasting ===
Broadcasting in Ireland is regulated by the Coimisiún na Meán, known as the Broadcasting Authority of Ireland (BAI) until 2023. It is the body that is authorised to regulated what can be broadcast on radio and TV on behalf of the Department of Culture, Communications and Sport. All three major TV companies; RTÉ, Virgin Media Television and TG4 have editorial guidelines. News, current affairs programmes and chat shows are like newspapers, in that they are pretty much free to broadcast on anything, provided they don't break Ireland's strict libel and contempt of court laws. They are also required to be objective and broadcast a range of political viewpoints. Television companies since 2005 voluntary have put a watershed of 9pm, in which programming for a mature audience can be shown. A significant quantity of audio-visual media in Ireland comes directly or indirectly from the United Kingdom, and as such it is subject to British regulation and censorship. British audio-visual media is not regulated by Coimisiún na Meán, but by Ofcom.

In January 2014 in an incident known as Pantigate, during an interview on the RTÉ One talk show The Saturday Night Show, the host Brendan O'Connor was discussing homophobia with well known drag queen Rory O'Neill. O'Neill commented that, in his opinion, the religious think tank the Iona Institute and two conservative journalists, John Waters and Breda O’Brien, were homophobic. The three parties collectively threatened RTÉ with libel action, and forced the broadcaster to remove the clip from the catch-up service RTÉ Player. RTÉ settled the three parties with an 85 thousand euro pre-court settlement. Nevertheless, the settlement itself was harshly criticised by members of Oireachtas, especially civil rights campaigner senator David Norris and MEP Paul Murphy. RTÉ's head of television defended the pay-out stating that it saved RTÉ "an absolute multiple" in the long term.

=== Central Bank of Ireland ===
In July 2009, the Central Bank of Ireland blocked insurers and banks from making any critical statements containing "any references" to them by means either of "public press statements" or un-approved public references, whether "written or oral."

=== Credit Institutions (Stabilisation) Act 2010 ===
The Credit Institutions (Stabilisation) Act 2010 was passed by 78–71 in December 2010 in partial response to the post-2008 Irish banking crisis. Section 60 provides that the Irish government may apply to the courts for an order made under the Act to be heard in private. Section 59 prohibits anyone from publishing the fact that the minister has made an order or direction under the Act; even publication that such a prohibition order has been made is also an offence under the Act. Days after the Act was passed, an order was sought by minister Brian Lenihan Jnr and approved allowing a transfer of over €3.7 billion into Allied Irish Bank, then an insolvent bank. Two Irish Times reporters were expelled from the court by judge Maureen Harding Clark just before the hearing.

=== Oireachtas footage ===
Proceedings of the Dáil Éireann, the Seanad Éireann, and various Oireachtas Committees are broadcast on Oireachtas TV and the Houses of Oireachtas website. Although the copyright of footage is under a version of a Creative Commons licence CC BY 4.0, the copyright does limit on the use of this footage, including a prohibition of its use in the context of political satire or light entertainment. A way to deal around this restriction is by presenting footage of the Oireachtas as stand alone news, and then showing the footage through satire. An example of this is when in December 2009, Green deputy Paul Gogarty used unparliamentary language in the Dáil, by saying the f-word at Labour deputy Emmet Stagg. Due to its wide reporting in the press, the deputy was asked to explain the situation on a chat show which included showings of the incident.

== Editorial control ==
In 2026 Minister for Communications Patrick O'Donovan has requested more government-friendly media coverage.

== Formerly censored topics ==
=== The Troubles: RTÉ and Section 31 of the Broadcasting Authority Act ===
During the Troubles in Northern Ireland, from 1968 to 1994, censorship was used principally to prevent Raidió Teilifís Éireann (RTÉ) interviews with spokespersons for Sinn Féin and for the IRA. Under Section 31 of the Broadcasting Authority Act 1960, the Minister for Posts and Telegraphs could issue a ministerial order to the government-appointed RTÉ Authority not to broadcast material specified in the written order. In 1971 the first order under the section was issued by Fianna Fáil Minister for Posts and Telegraphs Gerry Collins. It instructed RTÉ not to broadcast,

any matter that could be calculated to promote the aims or activities of any organisation which engages in, promotes, encourages or advocates the attaining of any particular objectives by violent means.

Collins refused clarification when RTÉ asked for advice on what this legal instruction meant in practice. RTÉ interpreted the Order politically to mean that spokespersons for the Provisional and Official IRA could no longer appear on air. In 1972 the government sacked the RTÉ Authority for not sufficiently disciplining broadcasters the government accused of breaching the Order. RTÉ's Kevin O'Kelly had reported on an interview that he conducted with the (Provisional) IRA Chief of Staff, Seán Mac Stíofáin, on the Radio Éireann This Week programme. The recorded interview was not itself broadcast. MacStiofáin's voice was not heard. However, he was arrested after the O'Kelly interview and charged with membership of the IRA, an illegal organisation. Soon afterwards, at the non-jury Special Criminal Court O'Kelly was jailed briefly for contempt because he refused to identify a voice on a tape seized by the Gardaí as that of Mac Stiofáin. Mac Stiofáin was convicted in any case. On appeal by O'Kelly to the Supreme Court a fine was substituted as a means of purging O'Kelly's contempt. The fine was paid anonymously and O'Kelly was released.

In 1976, Labour Minister for Posts and Telegraphs Conor Cruise O'Brien amended Section 31 of the Broadcasting Act. He also issued a new Section 31 Order. O'Brien censored spokespersons for specific organisations, including the Sinn Féin political party, rather than specified content. That prevented RTÉ from interviewing Sinn Féin spokespersons under any circumstances, even if the subject was unrelated to the IRA campaign in Northern Ireland conflict. On one occasion that led to the interruption of a call-in show about gardening on radio because a caller was a member of Sinn Féin. The changes eroded liberal interpretations by RTÉ of its censorship responsibilities, afforded by the original 1971 Order, and encouraged a process of illiberal interpretation.

Also in 1976, O'Brien attempted to extend censorship to newspaper coverage of the 'Troubles' by targeting in particular The Irish Press; In an interview with Washington Post reporter Bernard Nossiter, O'Brien identified Press Editor, Tim Pat Coogan, as someone who might be prosecuted under a proposed amendment to the Offences Against the State Act. O'Brien cited pro-republican Letters to the Editor as coming under the terms of the legislation for which the editor could be made legally liable. Coogan, who was immediately warned of O'Brien's intentions by Nossiter, then published the Nossiter-O'Brien interview (as did The Irish Times). Due to public opposition the proposed provisions were amended to remove the perceived threat to newspapers. The 1973-77 Fine Gael/Labour Coalition Government also tried to prosecute the Irish Press for its coverage of the maltreatment of republican prisoners by the Garda "Heavy Gang", with the paper winning the case.

The United Kingdom operated similar rules between 1988 and 1994 covering eleven republican and loyalist organisations, but they were less severe than the Section 31 Order. For instance, British broadcasters could dub Sinn Féin speeches and interviews with an actor's voice, or subtitle footage. That was not possible in Ireland where O'Brien's Section 31 Order, which remained in place until 1994, specifically banned 'reports of interviews' with spokespersons for censored organisations. Moreover, British broadcasters were more liberal than RTÉ in defining when a person was a spokesperson for a censored organisation. They held that an MP like Sinn Féin President Gerry Adams or a Sinn Féin councillor could be interviewed about constituency business or in their private capacity. RTÉ would not allow this under any circumstances, a stance that caused a crisis in RTÉ in the early 1990s. In addition, the British censorship rules did not apply at election time, whereas they operated at all times in Ireland.

Under severe pressure from successive governments, from approximately 1977 RTÉ extended Section 31 to censor all Sinn Féin members, not merely the Sinn Féin spokespersons specified in the Section 31 Order. This extension of the Order came to a head in the early 1990s. Sinn Féin member Larry O'Toole was not permitted to talk on RTÉ about a strike in Gateaux, a cake factory in Finglas, north Dublin, where O'Toole worked. He was informed in writing by RTÉ that his Sinn Féin membership was the reason for the censorship. O'Toole challenged what he contended was RTÉ self-censorship in the High Court. After the court found in O'Toole's favour in August 1992, RTÉ appealed the ruling that liberalised its Section 31 regime. Consequently, RTÉ were accused of appealing to be censored. RTÉ then lost in the Supreme Court in March 1993.

In 1991, European Commission of Human Rights upheld the ban in Purcell v. Ireland, though not unanimously. The Section 31 broadcasting ban lapsed on 19 January 1994 because it was not renewed by Minister for Arts, Culture and the Gaeltacht Michael D. Higgins, eight months prior to the August 1994 IRA ceasefire. The last person censored under the lapsing Order in January 1994 was Larry O'Toole, who was banned from appearing in a joint RTÉ/Channel Four programme on the Northern Ireland conflict, chaired by Channel Four's John Snow. The Channel Four production team wished to speak to O'Toole about his court victory. RTÉ would not permit this as O'Toole had been chosen as a candidate in European elections to be held five months later. RTÉ said O'Toole was therefore a Sinn Féin spokesperson, irrespective of the capacity in which he was to be interviewed or the proposed interview's distant relationship with a future election.

=== Abortion and birth control ===
Until the early 1990s, discussing abortion in any way, including the provision of impartial information, was disallowed, and any publication providing information on the medical treatment would be confiscated. In the 1980s, the Irish Family Planning Association and the Trinity College Dublin and University College Dublin students' unions were successfully sued by the Society for the Protection of Unborn Children for publishing telephone numbers for abortion clinics in the United Kingdom. On one occasion British newspaper The Guardian was withdrawn by its Irish distributors for a day to pre-empt a threatened ban due to the inclusion of an advertisement for a UK abortion clinic in that day's issue (despite the advert having appeared on a number of prior occasions without incident).

In May 1992, Proinsias De Rossa leader of Democratic Left, subverted this ban by reading the offending telephone numbers into the Dáil record; because of his absolute privilege as a member of the Oireachtas, he avoided prosecution.

In the wake of the X Case, the fourteenth amendment of the Constitution of Ireland approved in November 1992 removed the constitutional prohibition. Regulation of access to information to abortion was put on a statutory basis by the Regulation of Information (Services Outside the State For Termination of Pregnancies) Act 1995. This was repealed by the Health (Regulation of Termination of Pregnancy) Act 2018.

=== Blasphemy ===
Until 2018, blasphemy was prohibited by Article 40.6.1°.i. of the 1937 Constitution. The common law offence of blasphemous libel, applicable only to Christianity and last prosecuted in 1855, was ruled in 1999 to be incompatible with the Constitution's guarantee of religious equality. Since banning blasphemy was mandated by the Constitution, abolishing the offence required a referendum. Since it was deemed by the government of the time that a referendum solely for that purpose "would rightly be seen as a time wasting and expensive exercise", the lacuna was filled in 2009 by a new offence of "publication or utterance of blasphemous matter", against any religion, under the Defamation Act 2009, section 36. The law included the offence of blasphemous libel. It was never enforced.

The advocacy group Atheist Ireland responded to the enactment by announcing the formation of the "Church of Dermotology" (named after Dermot Ahern, the minister who introduced the 2009 law).^{[51]} On the date on which the law came into effect, it published a series of potentially blasphemous quotations on its website and vowed to challenge any resulting legal action.^{[52]} Scientist Richard Dawkins described the new law as "wretched, backward and uncivilised".

After the 2015 Charlie Hebdo shooting, Ali Selim of the Islamic Cultural Centre of Ireland suggested that the blasphemy provision of the Defamation Act 2009 should be applied to any media outlet reproducing cartoons depicting Muhammad as part of the "Je suis Charlie" campaign.^{[53]}

The text of the 2009 Act defined the crime where: he or she publishes or utters matter that is grossly abusive or insulting in relation to matters held sacred by any religion, thereby causing outrage among a substantial number of the adherents of that religion, and (b) he or she intends, by the publication or utterance of the matter concerned, to cause such outrage.

- The judge would need to be satisfied the matter is "abusive and insulting" as distinct from opinion.
- Judicial interpretation of "held sacred" and "any religion" could render the Act unenforceable.
- A defendant's lawyer would argue the definition of "grossly", "thereby causing", "outrage" and "substantial number".
- Article s.36 (3) provides that – "it shall be a defence to proceedings for an offence under this section for the defendant to prove that a reasonable person would find genuine literary, artistic, political, scientific, or academic value in the matter to which the offence relates.
- Further, a "religion" is further defined in s.36 (4); it – does not include an organisation or cult— (a) the principal object of which is the making of profit, or (b) that employs oppressive psychological manipulation— (i) of its followers, or (ii) for the purpose of gaining new followers.
- s.36 could be held to be in breach of 44.2.1° of the Constitution The State shall not impose any disabilities or make any discrimination on the ground of religious profession, belief or status.

In October 2014, Minister of State Aodhán Ó Ríordáin gave the official government response to a report on the blasphemy issue by the Constitutional Convention, announcing that it had decided to hold a referendum on the issue.^{[71]}

On 26 October 2018, a constitutional amendment was approved by a margin of 64.85% to 35.15% which removed the offence of blasphemy from the Constitution. The provisions of the Defamation Act 2009 were repealed upon the commencement of the Blasphemy (Abolition of Offences and Related Matters) Act 2019 on 17 January 2020.

=== Mail ===
Censorship of mail in Ireland goes back to, at least, the 1660s and possibly earlier. Both overt and covert censorship of Irish mail took place, mainly in England and sometimes using warrants, from then through the 19th century. The Irish Civil War saw mail raided by the IRA, marked as censored and sometimes opened. This was the first recorded such action within the new independent state. The National Army also opened mail and censorship of irregulars' mail in prisons took place.

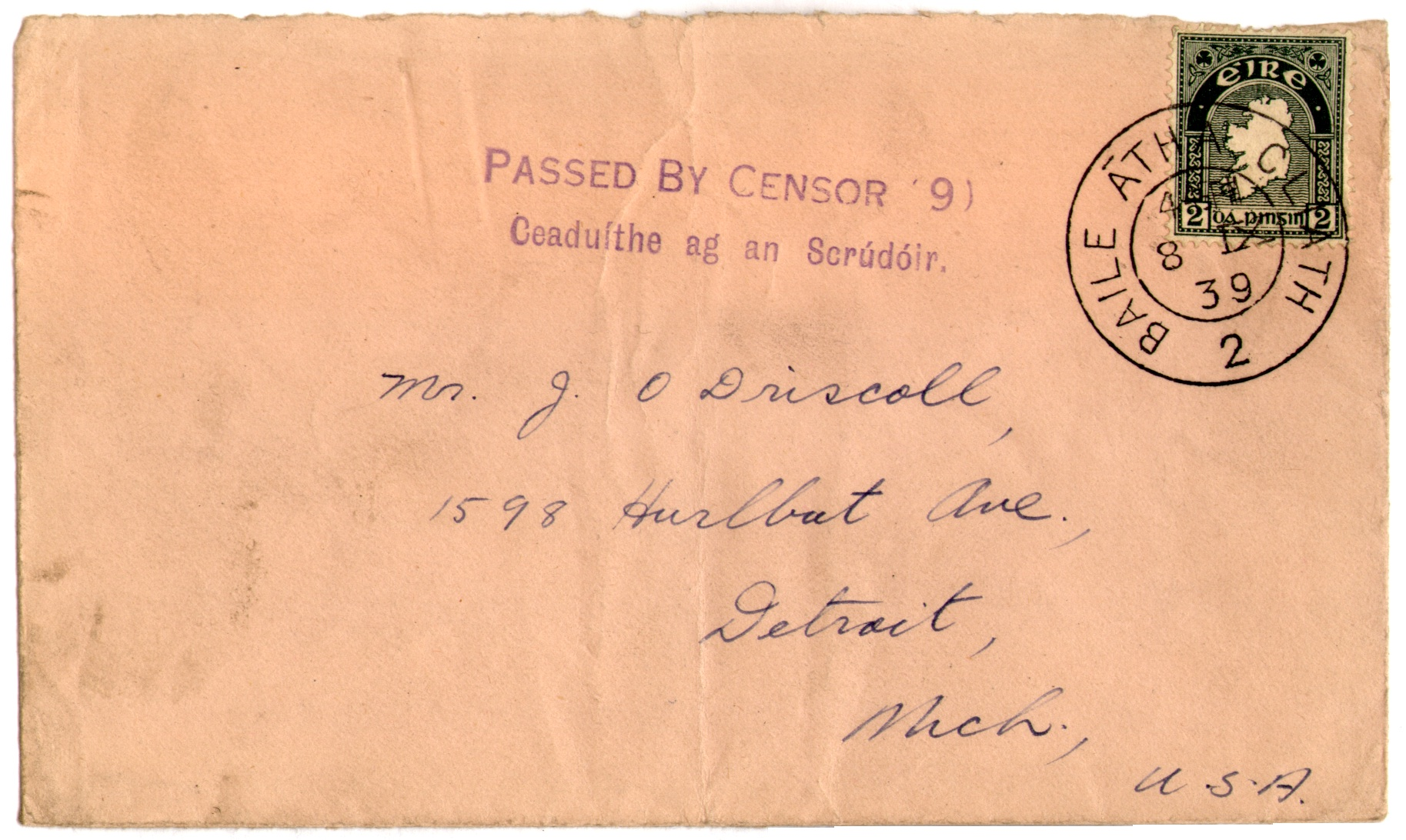
Envelope from Dublin to USA showing a bilingual Irish censor handstamp used 8 September 1939, just six days after the enabling legislation was enacted

During the 1939–1945 Emergency extensive postal censorship took place under the control of the Department of Defence whose powers were conferred by the Emergency Powers Act 1939. Civilian mail was controlled by the approximately 200 censors who worked in Dublin's Exchequer Street and who had all been vetted by the G2 Directorate of Intelligence and the Gardaí. Using the Black List and White List to target certain mail, the small staff were unable to effect 100% censorship; however, continental European mail was all reviewed, as was all incoming and outbound airmail. Following the overthrow of France and the Low Countries in May 1940, the British instigated full terminal mail censorship but the Irish were unable to look at more than about 10% due to the enormous staff this would have required. Covert censorship of mail between Northern Ireland and the south was effected by warrants obtained by G2, who also obtained warrants from the Minister for Justice for internal mail oversight.

The military internees, British, German and a few of other nationalities, held in the Curragh Camp had their mail censored, even local mail, though they are known to have posted their letters outside the camp to try to evade the camp oversight. IRA internees' mail was also censored under the Offences against the State Act that had been in place since June 1939.

The Border Campaign led to the internment of IRA members, again under the Offences against the State Act, and their mail was overtly censored between 1957 and 1960 most often with an Irish language censor mark reading Ceadaithe ag an gCinsire Mileata applied to the outside of the letter and also to the sheets contained within. In the 1980s mail from IRA members imprisoned in Limerick and likely also Portlaoise prisons has been recorded as censored but there is no record of civilian mail censorship since 1945.

== Unusual omissions ==
Since the 1990s, Ireland has rapidly developed from socially conservative, deeply religious Catholic-dominated state into a modern European, secular and liberal nation. Nevertheless, this has created a situation where legislation and regulation regarding certain areas of censorship hasn't caught up with the necessary requirements needed and as such this leads to various unusual omissions.

=== Music videos ===
Under the Video Recordings Act 1989, works that are concerned with religion, music or sport may be exempt from classification, thus music videos are exempt from film classification, whereas in the UK, they must be classified. Broadcasters usually use their discretion and obey the British classifications and showing-time restrictions. Ireland receives all of the UK-licensed music channels, which are subject to British music video laws; with the only Irish regulated broadcasters regularly showing music videos were Channel 6 or City Channel. However, for several years TV3 ran a late-night music programme, which quite often showed uncensored music videos containing large amounts of nudity.

=== Computer games ===
Unlike most other countries, the Film Classification Office have little involvement in computer game censorship. This led to an unusual situation where in 1997 the British-owned retailer GAME sold the British censored version of Carmageddon, whilst domestically owned retailers sold the uncut versions directly imported from the United States. Games may only be banned if the IFCO judges that it is unfit for viewing, which has happened once to date, with the banning of Manhunt 2 on 18 June 2007, over two weeks before its launch date of 6 July.

Ireland is a member of PEGI, but places no legal powers on its age recommendations. Retailers may attempt to enforce them at their discretion.

=== Sex shops ===
Due to Ireland's old conservative censorship laws on pornography and the country's social conservatism, dedicated sex shops didn't exist until the establishment of Utopia in February 1991 in the town of Bray, County Wicklow. Since then, Ireland unusually doesn't have any kind of licensing system or rules governing the sale of pornography or sex toys. Compared to the United Kingdom, where if a retailer who wishes to sell any kind of pornographic material such as magazines and DVDs, is required by law to be licensed by the local council with a sex establishment licence. By contrast, Irish retailers can sell any adult material provided it is legal. For example, the Irish branch of the second-hand retailer CeX openly sells second-hand pornographic DVDs. Also where in Great Britain, the shop windows of such retailers must be frosted or covered up as required under Indecent Displays (Control) Act 1981, no such requirements exist in Ireland. Any rules governing shop displays are more due to self censorship by the retailer, or guidelines governed by the retailer's landlord. The only legislation is the Indecent Advertisements Act 1889, which prohibits the display of anything indecent, that affixed to an object that is visible from the street.

There have been calls by both local residents and the then industry trade body, the Irish Association of Adult Shops to establish such a licensing system in Ireland. This is mainly so to restrict the development of such establishments near schools. As of 2026, no such licensing system exists.

== Irish statutes on censorship ==
- The Censorship of Films Act 1923 was an act "to provide for the official censoring of cinematographic pictures and for other matters connected therewith". It established the office of the Official Censor of Films and a Censorship of Films Appeal Board (and see William Magennis). It was amended by the Censorship of Films (Amendment) Act 1925, in connection with advertisements for films. It was amended by the Censorship of Films (Amendment) Act 1930 to extend the legislation to "vocal or other sounds" accompanying pictures.
- The Committee on Evil Literature was appointed in 1926 to report on the effectiveness of the censorship laws. It concluded that the then-current censorship laws were inadequate, and that the government had a duty to ban "morally corrupting" literature.
- The Censorship of Publications Act 1929 was an act "to make provision for the prohibition of the sale and distribution of unwholesome literature and for that purpose to provide for the establishment of a censorship of books and periodical publications, and to restrict the publication of reports of certain classes of judicial proceedings and for other purposes incidental to the matters aforesaid". It established the Censorship of Publications Board. A book caught by the act was one that "in its general tendency indecent or obscene ... or ... advocates the unnatural prevention of conception or the procurement of abortion or miscarriage or the use of any method, treatment or appliance for the purpose of such prevention or such miscarriage".
- The Emergency Powers Act 1939 dealt with the preservation of the State in time of war and contained provisions relating to the censorship of communications, including mail, newspapers and periodicals
- The Censorship of Publications Act 1946 repealed a large part of the 1929 act and was "to make further and better provision for the censorship of books and periodical publications". Periodicals caught by the act included issues that "have devoted an unduly large proportion of space to the publication of matter relating to crime".
- The Censorship of Publications Act 1967 provided for prohibition orders made on the grounds of indecency or obscenity to expire after a period of twelve years. A further prohibition order could then be made by the Censorship of Publications Board in respect of the same book.
- The Health (Family Planning) Act 1979 deleted references to "the unnatural prevention of conception" in the Censorship of Publications Act 1929 and the Censorship of Publications Act 1946.
- The Video Recordings Act 1989 regulates the broadcast and the sale of videos
- The Regulation of Information (Services Outside the State for Termination of Pregnancies) Act 1995 modified the effect of the Censorship of Publications Acts 1929 to 1967 in respect of certain information likely to be required by a woman to avail herself of "services provided outside the State for the termination of pregnancies". However, the information in question must not advocate or promote the termination of pregnancy.
- The Defamation Act 2009 which defines such offences.
- The Health (Regulation of Termination of Pregnancy) Act 2018 repealed
  - (a) sections 16 and 17 (1) of the Censorship of Publications Act 1929;
  - (b) sections 7 (b) and 9 (1)(b) of the Censorship of Publications Act 1946;
  - (c) section 10 of the Health (Family Planning) Act 1979;
  - (d) the Regulation of Information (Services outside the State for Termination of Pregnancies) Act 1995.
- The Blasphemy (Abolition of Offences and Related Matters) Act 2019 which
  - (a) amended section 7 (2)(a)(ii) of the Censorship of Films Act 1923;
  - (b) amended section 3 (2) of the Censorship of Films (Amendment) Act 1925;
  - (c) repealed sections 36 and 37 of the Defamation Act 2009.
