= May McGee =

Irish women's rights activist (1944–2025)

Mary McGee
- McGee in 1972
- Born: Mary Grimes; 1944; Skerries, County Dublin, Ireland
- Died: 28 October 2025 (aged 81); Dublin, Ireland
- Known for: Court case against Irish government for restricting her access to contraceptives
- Spouse: Shay McGee (m. 1968–2024)
- Children: 6
- Awards: Trinity Praeses Elit Award

Mary "May" McGee (née Grimes; 1944 – 28 October 2025) was an Irish women's rights activist who took the Government of Ireland to court for restricting her access to contraceptive materials. Her success in the McGee v The Attorney General case at the Supreme Court of Ireland paved the way for an eventual liberalisation in the country's laws on birth control.

== Early life ==
McGee was born near Skerries, County Dublin, in 1944, the second of a family of seven children. She met her husband, Seamus, or Shay, when they were both 14 and they married in June 1968. Her husband, a fisherman, died in 2024.

The couple's first four children were born in quick succession in 23 months between 1968 and 1970, Martin, Gerard and twins Sharon and Sylvia. Suffering pre-eclampsia and other problems during the pregnancies, almost dying after her second and being in a coma for four days after her third, she was warned by her doctor, James Loughran, by coincidence a campaigner for women's reproductive rights, that a further pregnancy could put her life in danger. At that time, she was 27 and the couple was living in a mobile home in Loughshinny, County Dublin.

== Legal action ==
Loughran, a member of the then-new Irish Family Planning Association, prescribed McGee a diaphragm and spermicide jelly, the latter of which the couple attempted to obtain from the United Kingdom. However, their shipment was seized by Irish customs authorities. At that time, under Section 17 of the Irish Criminal Law Amendment Act 1935, it was illegal to import contraceptives and the McGees were warned they could face prosecution. Although the contraceptive pill was increasingly available in Ireland, McGee could not use it because of her medical condition. Following an appeal by the couple at the High Court in 1972 (McGee v The Attorney General and the Revenue Commissioners), with legal support from Donal Barrington and Seán MacBride, the case eventually reached the country's Supreme Court in December 1973, with the judges ruling by 4:1 in her favour. In the 1972 hearing her husband, asked whether he would be pleased for his wife to use contraception, said: "I'd prefer to see her using contraceptives than be placing flowers on her grave".

The verdict was handed down with Judges Séamus Henchy, Frank Griffin, Gardner Budd and Brian Walsh in support and William FitzGerald dissenting. The judgement emphasised that the prohibition of the sale and importation of contraceptives made their use almost legally impossible, because to use contraceptives one would have to seek their importation with the prospect of facing a criminal conviction. The majority also held that the legislation violated the right to marital privacy.

== Subsequent events ==
The week after their Supreme Court victory the McGees went to Mass in Skerries where they were publicly criticised by the priest. The family walked out and McGee never returned.

Subsequent changes to the law to reflect the Supreme Court decision were slow. A bill introduced to Parliament in 1979 by the Minister for Health, Charles Haughey, sought to appease both sides by only making contraception available through a prescription for "bona fide" family planning, an approach he famously described as "an Irish solution to an Irish problem". A prescription for "emergency" contraception would be needed until 2017.

McGee had two more children before her husband had a vasectomy in 1981.

== Recognition ==
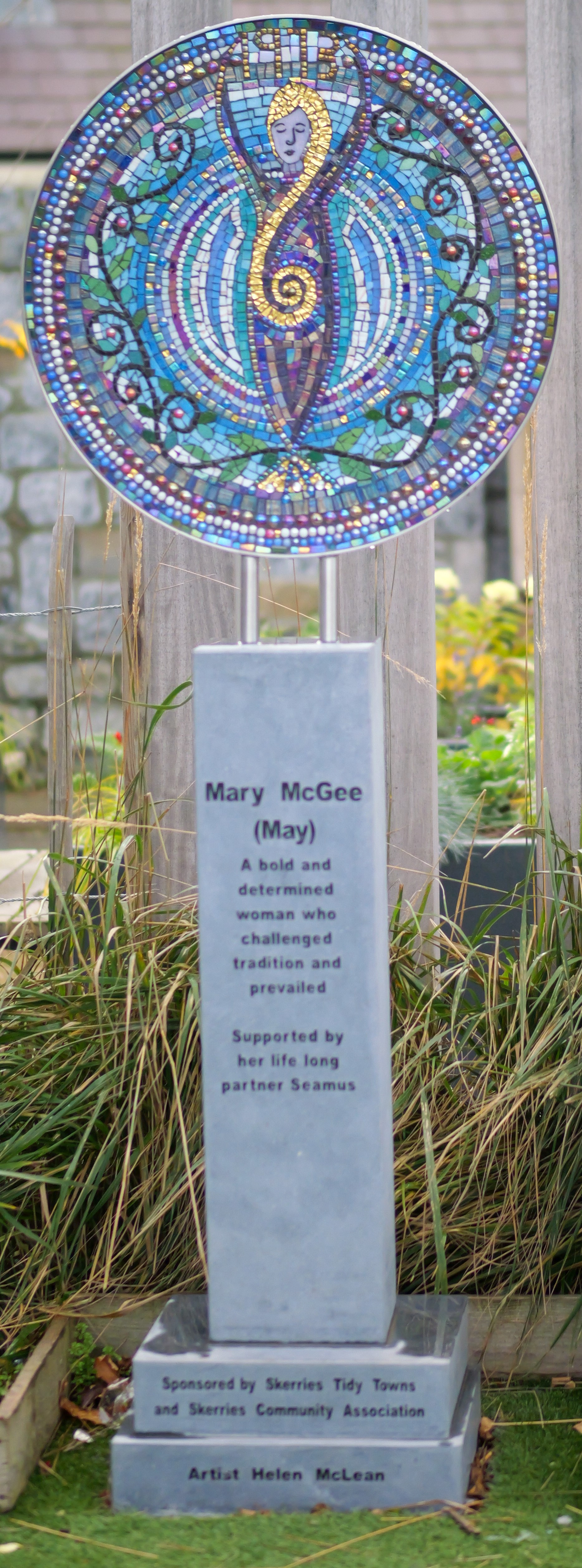
Sculpture commemorating Mary McGee

In 2023 McGee received the Trinity Praeses Elit Award from the Trinity College Dublin Law Society. This award had been founded by the former president of Ireland Mary Robinson, and was awarded to McGee in recognition of her "immense contribution to Irish law and society".

On the 50th anniversary of the Supreme Court decision, the director of the National Women's Council of Ireland stated:

I want to commend the unfathomable bravery and fortitude of May McGee in taking this case, in an Ireland that was rife with misogyny, and very much still under the thumb of the Catholic Church. While it was deeply unjust that the McGees had to have their private lives subjected to such public scrutiny, their personal fight for rights has undoubtedly improved the lives of every woman living in Ireland since, and we owe them a debt of gratitude. As is often the case in this country, the personal was forced to become the political in order to effect meaningful change.

A sculpture was unveiled in September 2025 in Floraville Park in the centre of Skerries, in recognition of her legacy. The piece was a mosaic by Helen McLean. McGee attended the ceremony, just weeks before her death, as did some of the family of the doctor who prescribed the contraceptives, as well as members of McGee's legal team who indicated that at the time they had not realised the importance of the legal case for Irish women.

== Death ==
McGee died on 28 October 2025 at Beaumont Hospital, Dublin at the age of 81. Her husband had died in 2024.
