= James Loughran (doctor) =

Irish general practitioner

James Loughran (29 July 1925 – 31 May 2023) was an Irish general practitioner and a founding member of the movement that led to the establishment of the Irish Family Planning Association (IFPA).

== Early life and education ==
Born in Dundalk, County Louth, Loughran was the second of three children. After his mother's death during his adolescence, Loughran studied medicine at University College Dublin, graduating in 1949.

== Career ==
Loughran worked in hospitals in London before returning to Ireland, where served as a locum on Arranmore and later as a dispensary doctor in Ballina, County Mayo.

In 1964, Loughran moved to Skerries, County Dublin, and established a general practice. In 1969, he was among the eight founding volunteers of the organisation that later became the Irish Family Planning Association (IFPA). IFPA opened its first family planning clinic at Merrion Square, Dublin, followed by additional clinics at Mountjoy Square in 1971 and Synge Street. The organisation was officially named the IFPA in 1973.

Loughran faced opposition for his work in family planning, including raids by the Gardaí for contraceptives and condemnation from the Catholic Church, which publicly criticised his activities. He and his family also provided support to young unmarried pregnant women, offering them accommodation and assistance. Additionally, Loughran, along with Drs. Paddy and Mary Randles, advocated for the abolition of corporal punishment.

In 1971, Loughran co-authored Family Planning: A Guide for Parents and Prospective Parents. The publication was initially banned by the Censorship of Publications Board in 1976 but became available again after a court challenge in 1977.

In 1973, Loughran supported his patient May McGee in a legal case (McGee v The Attorney General) that challenged the Irish Criminal Law Amendment Act (1935) regarding the importation of contraceptives. Loughran had prescribed McGee a diaphragm to be used with spermicide as her previous pregnancies has nearly killed her. Spermicide had to be imported and was seized by Customs under the 1935 law. The Supreme Court of Ireland reversed the High Court's dismissal of the case, contributing to the eventual legalisation of contraceptives in Ireland.

== Personal life ==
Loughran and his wife, Margaret (Peggy) Glynn, lived in Skerries, County Dublin with their four sons. They briefly resided in Sandymount in the late 1970s before returning to Skerries, where Loughran continued his medical practice and managed a family planning clinic in Dublin city center.

In his later years, he resided in an apartment in Skerries and worked on his memoirs until his health declined following a stroke in 2020. Loughran died in 2023.

== Bibliography ==
- Family Planning: A Guide for Parents and Prospective Parents (1971)
