= Irish Problem =

Irish Problem or Irish problem may refer to:

- Irish Question, late-19th-/early-20th–century UK political debate about the constitutional status of Ireland
- The Troubles, conflict in Northern Ireland during the late 20th century
- "An Irish solution to an Irish problem", political catchphrase
- The discrimination and persecution of Irish Americans

== See also ==
- Category:Controversies in Ireland
