= Secularism in the Republic of Ireland =

Period of sociopolitical and cultural change in Ireland

Secularism in the Republic of Ireland has been described as a "quiet revolution", comparable to the Quiet Revolution in Quebec. The term "quiet revolution" has been used to encompass a number of significant social and political movements related to secularism and secularisation, which have occurred in the late 20th and early 21st century. It has been described as a period where "the people led, and the politicians followed". Since the passing of a 1972 amendment with overwhelming public support, Ireland has had a secular constitution, although a high degree of religious influence over laws, education, and state business still persisted in the decades which followed, diminishing only in more recent times. In an assessment of the Irish state's overall secularity, Humanists International gave Ireland a mixed score (2.8 points out of a maximum of 5 for violations of freedom of thought), finding "systematic discrimination" against non-religious people in government, education, and society.

Former Taoiseach Leo Varadkar spoke of the country's contemporary era using the term "Quiet Revolution" following Ireland's historic repeal vote of the country's constitutional ban on abortion in 2018. This particular event which repealed the Eighth Amendment was labelled the tipping point. Other instances of secularised agenda and practice among the Irish public, figures, and the government have accumulated in the country to reflect the contemporary era of attitudinal change. One of these instances was in 2011 when then-Irish Taoiseach Enda Kenny made a parliamentary condemnation speech of the Vatican's response to clerical child abuse allegations during the Commission of Investigation into the Catholic diocese of Cloyne. Kenny's words; "the dysfunction, the disconnection, the elitism that dominate the culture of the Vatican today", were met with nation-wide support in public, political and clerical domains.

The Constitution of Ireland says that "no law may be made either directly or indirectly to endow any religion". However, in practice, some religious groups are legally and financially endowed by the state in the provision of some state-funded services, including education, where almost 90% of state-funded primary schools have Catholic "patronage". An article by Humanists International, published in 2020, compared the constitution's requirement of neutrality on religious questions with the practice, in the Dáil and Seanad, of beginning all sessions with a prayer. The same article queried whether hospitals, like schools, under religious patronage could discriminate against non-religious people by prioritising religious patients. The constitution also has some contradictory requirements on the question of secularism and equal treatment of different religious and philosophical convictions. For example, the President is required to take a religious oath, and a non-religious alternative is not provided for - "effectively preclud[ing] conscientious atheists and agnostics from holding" this role. The same lack of non-religious provision applies in criminal justice, too; all witnesses and jurors must make a religious oath and cannot instead make a secular affirmation in open court (as they can in the United Kingdom).

== History ==
=== Roman Catholic Church ===
The laws governing the Republic of Ireland, as well as Ireland's socio-cultural principles, had until the late 20th century been heavily influenced and dictated by the Roman Catholic Church. Long before and throughout pre-modern and modern history, a majority of Irish citizens were Catholic.

Roman Catholicism as a religion values particular older practices and has impacted on Ireland's society and culture. The Church had extreme control of Irish society, through forms including its prohibition of followers to read from a list of banned literature, and through its influence on the constitution. For example, within the Health (Family Planning) Act 1979, the Catholic Church commanded the rule that prescription was necessary in order for access to contraception, rather than allowing citizens the right and free ability to access such human services. Prior to prescription-based access, people did not possess the right to access contraception under law. Under "pro-life" conscious, the Catholic Church supported the Eighth Amendment of the Constitution Act of 1983, which recognised the equal right to life of the pregnant woman and the unborn.

The Irish Education Act 1831 derives from the Catholic Church, which influenced the teachings and philosophies in the public education system in Ireland until the post-modern era. The church has effective influence on primary school education today. Historically, in relation to the constitution and the general population, the Church maintained strong religious influence and subsequent control in the general order and operation of the Republic of Ireland. In more recent times, both quantitative and qualitative data shows that the country and its people are becoming secularized and are promoting ideologies of progressive and liberal natures. In 1973, Fine Gael supported a proposal to remove the Roman Catholic Church's status of "special position" in the constitution so that Ireland would become a secular state, which the voters approved.

=== Secularization ===
During the 21st century, census data has revealed decreases in religious activity in the Republic of Ireland. Christianity, dominated by the Roman Catholic Church remains the largest in Ireland, with 69% of citizens identifying as Catholic as of 2022. The next largest group are non-believers – people who declare that they are not religious – which accounts for 14% of the population as of 2022. In comparison to data collected in 2016, these figures show a clear positive trend in the decline of religious gravity in the country. The census data from only 6 years earlier reports almost 79% of the population identifying as Catholic and only 10% as not religious. As acknowledged by scholar Louise Fuller in her piece, Contemporary Catholicism in Ireland: a critical appraisal, 2010, many of those who then identified as Catholic in Ireland did not consider the Church's message relevant to their everyday practice. The census statistics acknowledge the growing existence of other religious attitudes in Ireland. The data represents the accommodation of other religions and their expression of religious freedom, as well as ideologies separate from religion in the Republic of Ireland.

== Notable events ==
Street art during Irish abortion referendum (Photo taken in Dublin in June 2018)

The term "quiet revolution" embodies within it socio-cultural and socio-political events, movements and revolutions which have occurred in the late 20th and early 21st century. The following are claimed to be aspects that make up the "quiet revolution" in the Republic of Ireland, oftentimes involving "an Irish solution to an Irish problem":

=== New Age movement ===
The postmodern New Age movement, which developed in the 1970s, reflects an eclectic change in the way many people associate with religion and spirituality. New Age spiritualities are forms of religiosity, yet they reflect both secularization and "post-secularization". These co-exist in Ireland, as increased separation of religion from public life and from social institutions reflects secularization, and new age religions that are developing reflect a post-secular era of modernity in Ireland.

=== Feminist movement ===
Feminism in Ireland has involved much advocating and success for women's rights in the Republic of Ireland. The 2018 overturn of the Eighth Amendment in order to legalize abortion is one of the largest outcomes of this movement, exemplifying the (mostly Catholic identifying) population's secularized and liberalized attitudes in contemporary Ireland. Other issues which have undergone changes in policy and law under the banner of feminism include employment, marriage and divorce, politics and reproductive rights.

=== Sexual revolution ===
The sexual revolution has seen the millennials of Ireland behave in a liberated, expressionist manner in relation to their sexual development. The Catholic custom of being married and bearing children in Ireland no longer occurs as stringently as it did. Men and women are becoming sexually active earlier than at any other period in history, they are more likely to be single, and the attitudes towards commercial sex, prostitution and pornography have widely changed to be accepted. The laws limiting access to contraceptives and family planning services gradually reformed over the late 20th century and early 21st century to allow the public free admission to purchase them. The Health (Family Planning) (Amendment) Act of 1993 saw the provision of sales to the public, which is legislation today. Over 50% of votes for the Fifteenth Amendment of the Constitution Act referendum of 1995 to remove the constitutional prohibition on divorce meant the right for divorce was signed into law in 1996, despite the Catholic Church's strong disinclination towards the amendment.

=== LGBT rights ===
In 1993 homosexual acts were decriminalized in Ireland. In 2015, LGBT rights activism brought about an amendment to the Constitution of Ireland in terms of marriage laws. The Thirty-fourth Amendment of the Constitution (Marriage Equality) Act 2015 meant that the prohibition of same-sex marriage was abolished and marriage between two persons without distinction as to their sex was permitted.

=== Blasphemy law ===
The publication or utterance of blasphemous matter was an offence specified by the Constitution of Ireland as an exception to general guarantee of the right of the citizens to express freely their convictions and opinions. In Corway v Independent Newspapers (1999), the Supreme Court held that the common law crime of blasphemous libel related to an established church and could not have survived the enactment of the Constitution. They also held that it was impossible to say what the offence of blasphemy consisted of.

The matter came to public attention, in May 2017, when it was announced that English comedian Stephen Fry, along with broadcaster RTÉ, were under criminal investigation for blasphemy under the Act, following a complaint from a member of the public about comments made by Fry in a 2015 broadcast interviewed with veteran Irish broadcaster Gay Byrne. The case was dropped after Gardaí confirmed that they had not been able to locate a sufficient number of offended people.

In June 2018, Minister for Justice and Equality Charles Flanagan announced that the government would hold a referendum to simply remove the reference to the offence of blasphemy from the Constitution.

In October 2018, citizens voted overwhelmingly to repeal Ireland's blasphemy law, effecting the Thirty-seventh Amendment of the Constitution of Ireland.

=== Baptism barrier ===
In 2018, the Irish Government legislated to end the so-called 'baptism barrier', which allowed religious affiliation in the form of Catholic baptism to be used as criteria in admitting pupils to primary schools.

However, the so-called baptism barrier remains in place for secondary schools, and religious discrimination is still lawful for minority faiths at both primary and secondary level. Ireland remains one of only four countries in the OECD (alongside the UK, Estonia, and Israel) which permitted religious discrimination in admission to state-funded school places.

== Notable figures ==
=== Leo Varadkar ===
Taoiseach Leo Varadkar used the term "quiet revolution" in reference to changes in Ireland's social and cultural norms. He was the leader of Fine Gael from 2017 and campaigned for policies related to equality of opportunity. Varadkar was Ireland's first openly gay Taoiseach. He was also openly non-religious in office.

=== Enda Kenny ===
Enda Kenny has played a prominent political role in Ireland since 1975. In 2011 when he was Taoiseach, Kenny publicly condemned the Catholic Church in matters related to clerical child abuse and the values which dominate the culture of the Vatican. As reported by the media, the content of the Cloyne Report and Kenny's reaction speech caused controversy and acrimony amongst Irish citizens. Kenny's reaction in the Dáil Éireann marks a significant point as part of "Ireland's journey away from being a mono-Catholic state into a 21st century European republic”.

=== Garret FitzGerald ===
Although largely unsuccessful, Garret FitzGerald is notable for being the first Taoiseach to advocate for a more liberal version of Irish society and create what he called the non-sectarian nation of "Tone and Davis". His attempt to introduce divorce was defeated in a referendum, although he did liberalise Ireland's contraception laws. The controversial Anti-abortion amendment, which was stated to recognise the 'Right to Life of the Unborn, with due regard to the Equal Right to Life of the Mother' was added to the Irish constitution, against FitzGerald's advice, in a national referendum. Although begun by the previous Fianna Fáil administration, FitzGerald later said his decision to carry on with the referendum and resulting change to the constitution was one of his greatest regrets.

== Reactions ==
Ireland's progressive changes in policy, described in some sources as a "quiet revolution", have caused upheaval amongst groups who have been actively contesting amendments of the constitution in Ireland for decades. For example, some female commentators have said that the term "quiet revolution" brushes off women's "screaming, shouting and singing for abortion rights" in their campaigning over a number of decades. Members of the feminist movement have stated that the revolution is not over, with new human rights movements starting including the cervical cancer scandal, the treatment of sexual abuse victims, clerical child abuse (which is addressed openly in then-Taoiseach Enda Kenny's condemnatory speech regarding the Cloyne Report, 2011) and the homelessness crisis.

In relation to abortion in Ireland, the Catholic Church continues to oppose abortion, yet archbishop of Dublin, Diarmuid Martin, is one of few clergymen who acknowledge that the Church must negotiate ways of existing in Ireland's newly secular society. The decline of institutional Church authority and observance reflects the decline of faith amongst the populace. Archbishop Martin suggests that the concept of pro-life should incorporate "Jesus's loving care for human life at any stage” or circumstance, including support for women who are in difficult or painful situations. In opposition to the idea of the Church renewing its commitment to supporting life is the backlash and outrage of the Catholic institution. He acknowledges that the stringency of this religious pro-life principle results in the Church losing their moral voice amongst the nation. The existence of both traditional theology and renewed ideology within the Catholic institution creates friction and inconsistencies, which ebbs church authority further and causes social policy to change.

Following the 2018 abortion referendum in the Republic of Ireland, public campaigning increased in Northern Ireland for complete rights to abortion. Secularized practices in the Republic have influenced the North to follow suit. For example Sinn Féin, which advocates for "Europe-wide measures that promote and enhance human rights, equality and the all-Ireland agenda", advocated for same-sex marriage in Northern Ireland. The party has also advocated for updates to abortion legislation, in Northern Ireland, covering certain limited scenarios.
