= Collop (unit) =

Measure of land sufficient to graze one cow

A collop (Irish: cológ) is a measure of land sufficient to graze one cow.

== History ==
In Irish tradition, a collop is defined as the amount of land deemed capable of producing enough to support one family, or the number of cattle that the family could rear by pasture on it. It was the basis for the division of common land in the western parts of Ireland in the 18th and early 19th centuries. As in the Rundale system, the collop was scattered over several different fields, so that good and bad land was equally divided.

In Eric Cross's The Tailor and Ansty, Timothy "the Tailor" Buckley describes a collop as "an old count for the carrying power of land", noting that it was the grazing of one cow, or two yearling heifers, or six sheep, or twelve goats, or six geese and a gander, while a horse would require three collops. He describes it as a superior method of reckoning land to the acre, noting a man whose holding of 4,000 acres of barren land produces scarcely enough to feed four cattle.

In Ireland, a collop can also refer to the calf on a leg, from the Irish colpa, and by extension a slice of meat or a large portion of food. The day before Shrove Tuesday was known as Collop Monday when food such as bacon and eggs would be eaten in abundance before lent.
