= Censorship of Publications Board (Ireland) =

Independent government-appointed board

The Censorship of Publications Board is a formally independent but government-appointed board established by the Censorship of Publications Act 1929 to examine books and periodicals that are for sale in Ireland. It is governed by the Censorship of Publications Acts of 1929, 1946 and 1967. The Board has the authority to prohibit any book or periodical that they find to be obscene. This makes it illegal to buy, sell or distribute that publication in Ireland. The Board prohibited a large number of publications in the past, including books by respected authors. However, since the 1990s it has not prohibited publications very often.

== Establishment ==
On 2 October 1925 the Minister for Justice, Kevin O'Higgins stated in Dáil Éireann that the existing censorship laws were sufficient to deal with the sale and distribution of obscene literature, and that it was not the State's duty to decide what was proper for the Irish public to read. However, public pressure caused O'Higgins to appoint a Committee on Evil Literature to determine whether it was necessary to extend the government's existing censorship powers so that public morality could be safeguarded.

The committee, initially consisting of a professor of English literature, two members of parliament, a Church of Ireland clergyman and a Roman Catholic priest, heard submissions from individuals, organisations and institutions, including religious and social institutions. Its report, which expressed dissatisfaction with the existing laws, was presented to the minister on 28 December 1926. One problem was that the vast majority of the publishers of offensive material operated outside Ireland, leaving only individual booksellers and distributors liable to prosecution. Their prosecution did not have any real impact on the availability of objectionable material. Another problem was that the powers of customs and postal authorities to seize this material were ill-defined and seizure was thus ineffectual. The Committee concluded that it was the Irish state's duty to prevent the circulation of publications that were considered to be obscene and morally corrupting. The Committee proposed the introduction of new legislation and the establishment of a censorship board to advise the minister on which publications should be prohibited.

== The Board ==
The Censorship of Publications Act 1929 established the Censorship of Publications Board. The Censorship of Publications Board can examine any book or periodical that is for sale in Ireland. A publication found to be obscene can be prohibited, making its buying, selling or distribution in Ireland illegal. A prohibition can be appealed to the Censorship of Publications Appeal Board.

The Censorship of Publications Board and the Censorship of Publications Appeal Board have five members each, serving five-year terms unpaid. The members of both boards are appointed by the Minister for Justice, Home Affairs and Migration, but both boards are independent authorities and no minister has power over their decisions.

=== Rules ===
The Censorship of Publications Board examines any book or periodical referred to it by a Customs and Excise officer or by a member of the public. It can also examine any such publication on its own initiative. If the Board finds that a publication is obscene, it can be prohibited for a period of time. During this period any buying, selling or distribution of the publication in Ireland is banned.

Every member of the board must read the publication in question before deciding whether to prohibit it. For a book to be prohibited, at least three members of the Board must agree with the decision and only one member can dissent. If a prohibition is passed, it comes into effect as soon as it is announced in Iris Oifigiúil, Ireland's official gazette.

A book can be prohibited by the Censorship of Publications Board if they consider it to be indecent or obscene. A periodical can be prohibited if it is considered to be frequently or usually indecent or obscene, or if the Board is of the opinion that an unduly large proportion of space in the periodical is given to matters related to crime. A book or periodical may also be prohibited if the Board considers that it advocates abortion or ways of carrying out abortions. Most of the publications considered by the Board have been reported because of obscenity. When considering a book, the Board measures its literary, scientific and historical merit and takes note of its general tenor, the language in which it is written, and its likely circulation and readership.

A prohibition order on a book lasts for a period of twelve years. A first prohibition order on a periodical is for a period of three, six or twelve months, depending on how often it is published. A second or subsequent prohibition order on a periodical causes it to be permanently banned. A prohibition order can be appealed against by the author, editor or publisher of the book, the publisher of the periodical or any five members of the Oireachtas. A person convicted of possessing prohibited publications is liable for a fine of €63.49 or six months imprisonment.

== History ==
=== Censorship of Publications Act 1929 ===
The laws enacted by the Censorship of Publications Act, 1929 were introduced in an era of political isolationism and cultural and economic protectionism. Catholicism, the religion of 93% of the population, was the fundamental philosophy behind the censorship laws.

A main aim of the new legislation was to prevent the introduction of "unwholesome" foreign influences such as materialism, consumerism and immorality. Specifically, this meant works that were considered to be indecent or obscene, newspapers whose content relied too much on crime, and works that promoted the "unnatural" prevention of conception or that advocated abortion. Irish writers who were found offensive were officially regarded as agents of decadence and social disintegration who were striking at the roots of family life and moral decency. For example, Father P.J. Gannon thought that the Act was "but a simple measure of moral hygiene, forced upon the Irish public by a veritable spate of filth never surpassed". He thought that all literature must provide "noble ground for noble emotion". President Éamon de Valera felt that the arts in Ireland were to be encouraged when they observed the "holiest traditions", but should be censored when they failed to live up to this ideal.

Although the new laws were typical of censorship laws in many other countries in the 1920s and 1930s, they were implemented with an eagerness which gradually alienated and embittered many Irish writers. It caused some writers to leave the country. The author Mervyn Wall explains that during the 1930s there was 'a general intolerant attitude to writing, painting and sculpture. These were thought dangerous, likely to corrupt faith and morals...One encountered frequently among ordinary people bitter hostility to writers...Obscurantism had settled on the country like a fog, so of course anyone who had eyes to see and the heart to feel, was rebellious.' The Academy of Letters established by William Butler Yeats attempted to fight censorship with solidarity among writers, but it achieved little in this field. The fight against literary censorship was fought mainly by isolated figures. Seán Ó Faoláin, perhaps the most vociferous critic of the censorship laws, wrote: 'Our Censorship...tries to keep the mind in a state of perpetual adolescence in the midst of all the influences that must, in spite of it, pour in from the adult world.'

Among the first 13 books to be banned (announced in the Iris Oifigúil, in May 1930) were Point Counter Point by Aldous Huxley, The Well of Loneliness by Radclyffe Hall and several books on sex and marriage by Margaret Sanger and Marie Stopes. Surprisingly, none of James Joyce's writings were ever banned by the Board, while copies of his works were burnt by the British Customs, and Ulysses was banned in the U.S. for several years.

=== Emergency Powers Act 1939 ===
The Emergency Powers Act 1939 contained provisions for the censorship of newspapers and periodicals during World War II.

=== Censorship of Publications Act 1946 ===
In 1942 Eric Cross' book The Tailor and Ansty was banned by the Board. The book was a collection of stories and sayings from an old country tailor called Timothy Buckley and his wife Anastasia that the author had recorded. Although they were exactly the type of Irish people romanticised by de Valera, their real-life language was too broad and racy for the Censorship Board. After the book was banned, three priests forced Buckley to go on his knees and burn the book in his own fireplace.

In November 1942 there was an important debate about the censorship system in the Oireachtas. Sir John Keane moved that the Censorship Board be reconstituted. Three banned publications in particular were debated. Sir John Keane was against their censorship, while Professor William Magennis was in favour. Keane read passages from The Tailor and Ansty. The Chairman of the Senate instructed that these passages were deleted from the public report of the debate.

The Censorship of Publications Act, 1946 made "further and better provision" for the censorship of publications. Periodicals that had a large amount of matter related to crime were liable to be banned. The Act also established the Appeals Board. The first application made to the Appeals Board involved Brian Merriman's Irish language book The Midnight Court, which had been translated into English by Frank O'Connor. The appeal was dismissed without a hearing for the appealing parties.

Many important works of literature continued to be banned by the Board, including East of Eden by John Steinbeck, The Heart of the Matter by Graham Greene and The African Queen by C. S. Forester. Other authors banned included Theodore Dreiser, F. Scott Fitzgerald, Robert Graves, Ernest Hemingway, D. H. Lawrence, Wyndham Lewis, Thomas Mann, John Cowper Powys, Somerset Maugham and Evelyn Waugh. Irish writers who were censored included Austin Clarke, Benedict Kiely, Edna O'Brien, Kate O'Brien, Frank O'Connor and Seán Ó Faoláin. In 1950, Robert Graves described the Irish censorship laws as 'the fiercest literary censorship this side of the Iron Curtain.'

=== Arts Council ===
The Arts Council of Ireland, an autonomous body established by the government to promote, fund and advise the government on the arts, was created in 1951. It was initially headed by Father O'Sullivan, a Catholic priest. The Council took a strong anti-censorship stance and awarded innovative young artists, musicians and writers as winners of the Macaulay Prize, a fellowship, including Noel Sheridan, Seóirse Bodley, Brian Friel and John McGahern.

McGahern was awarded the Macauley Prize for his first novel The Barracks. He took a year's leave of absence from his position as a teacher in a Dublin primary school to take up the fellowship. However, the Censorship Board banned his second novel The Dark because of its themes of parental and clerical child abuse in June 1965 and he was not allowed to resume his job. The 'McGahern case' became a cause célèbre and was a significant factor in encouraging the Fianna Fáil government to again amend the censorship law.

=== Censorship of Publications Act 1967 ===
Brian Lenihan, the Minister for Justice, sponsored the Censorship of Publications Act, 1967. This act limited the period of prohibition orders of books to twelve years (although books released after this period could be banned again by the Board). The act thus allowed the immediate sale of over 5,000 previously banned books.

=== Amendments to the 1967 Act ===
In 1976, the Censorship of Publications Board banned the Irish Family Planning Association's booklet Family Planning – A Guide for Parents and Prospective Parents – the Board considered the booklet "indecent or obscene". The Health (Family Planning) Act, 1979 deleted references to "the unnatural prevention of conception" in the 1929 and 1949 Acts, thus allowing publications with information about contraception to be distributed in Ireland.

The Regulation of Information (Services Outside the State for the Termination of Pregnancies) Act 1995 modified the 1929, 1946 and 1967 Acts to allow publications with information about "services provided outside the State for the termination of pregnancies". However, no publications that advocated or promoted abortions were permitted.

=== Since 2000 ===
On 11 August 1999, the entertainment listings magazine In Dublin was banned for six months because it was found to 'have been usually or frequently indecent or obscene.' It was investigated after complaints from the public regarding advertisements in the magazine for brothels posing as health studios. However, the Board did not suggest that the magazine's publishers were aware that they were brothels. The High Court lifted the ban, stating that its publishers should have been given the opportunity to state their case before the Board before the ban was implemented.

On 18 May 2006, Lee Dunne's novel Paddy Maguire is Dead, a semi-autobiographical novel about a writer's descent into alcoholism, was released in Ireland after being banned for thirty-four years. The book was originally published in the United Kingdom in 1972, but was banned in Ireland on its release because it was thought to be indecent and obscene. The next six of his novels were also banned, making Dunne the most banned author in Ireland. He was unable to get a new book published in Ireland until the late 1980s.

Between 2000 and January 2018 a total of 34 periodicals and 11 books were referred to the board, of which 7 publications (all in 2003) were prohibited, and one book:The Raped Little Runaway, for containing "numerous explicit descriptions of the rape of a child", the first book banned since 1998.

== Criticisms ==
The Censorship of Publications Act 1967 remains in force. Some current criticisms of the board include the fact that its meetings are held in secret, that all complaints must be considered by the board (for example, the Bible had to be considered when it was submitted in 1988), and that the board operates generally on the basis of standards and criteria that are vague and ill-defined. A thoroughly researched critical study by Michael Adams, Censorship: The Irish Experience, was published in 1968 by the University of Alabama Press.

== See also ==
- Censorship in the Republic of Ireland
- Book censorship in the Republic of Ireland
