= Clann Éireann =

Political party in the Irish Free State (1926–27)

- Chairman: William Magennis
- General Secretary: Pádraic Ó Máille
- Founded: 25 January 1926
- Dissolved: 28 August 1927
- Split from: Cumann na nGaedheal
- Ideology: Irish Republicanism

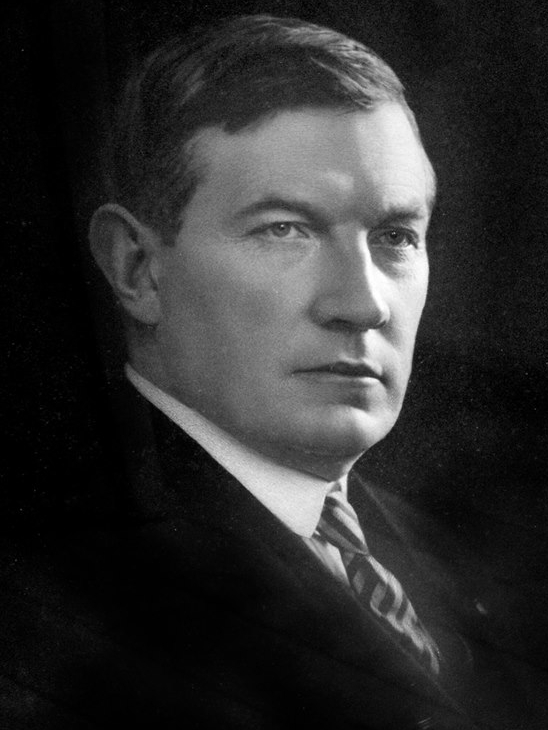
Pádraic Ó Máille

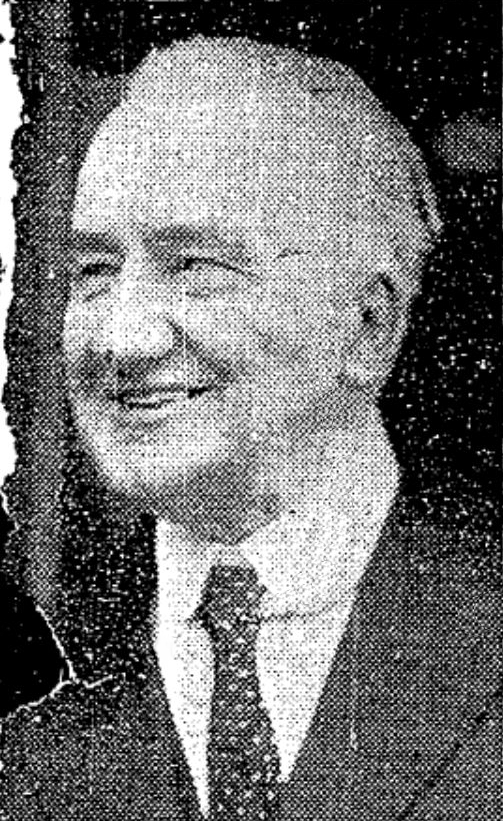
William Magennis

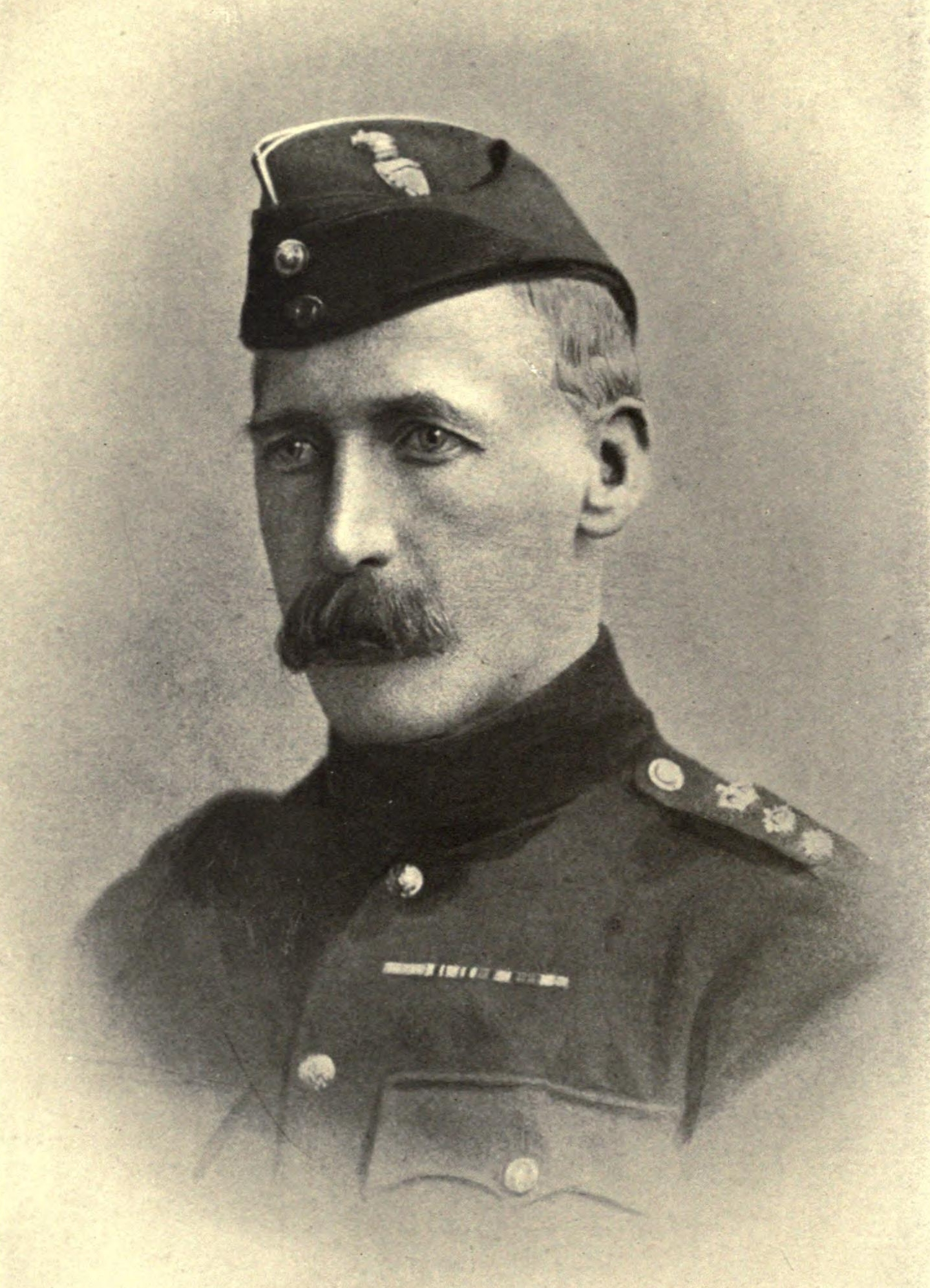
Maurice George Moore

Ó Máille, Magennis and Moore were amongst the most prominent members of the party

Clann Éireann (Irish: [ˌklˠaːn̪ˠ ˈeːɾʲən̪ˠ]; English: "Family of Ireland"), also known as the People's Party, was a minor republican political party in the Irish Free State. The party was founded on 25 January 1926 as a result of a split from the ruling Cumann na nGaedheal party, to protest against the Boundary Commission report, which permanently demarcated the border between the Free State and Northern Ireland. Clann Éireann was the leading representative of constitutional republicanism in Dáil Éireann until the success of Fianna Fáil at the June 1927 general election.

The party chairman was Professor William Magennis, Teachta Dála (TD) for the National University. The secretaries included Pádraic Ó Máille TD for Galway. Other prominent members of the party included Maurice George Moore, who at the time was a member of the senate, and Christopher Byrne, who was a sitting TD for Wicklow who was one of those who had resigned from Cumann na nGaedheal over the Boundary issue.

The party demanded for Ireland "one and indivisible as of right the full status of a sovereign State. We aim at restoring the unity of her territory and the union of all her people under one central supreme government". The party advocated the abolition of the Oath of Allegiance to the British King. It also called for lower taxes and less legislation. In policies like trade protectionism and the abolition of the Oath of Allegiance, it agreed with the agenda of Sinn Féin leader Éamon de Valera. An attempt to lure de Valera and his followers into the party failed. After de Valera created the Fianna Fáil party in March 1926, Clann Éireann grew closer to that group.

The party attracted little support and it failed to win any seats in Dáil Éireann at the June 1927 general election. Its seven candidates only attracted a few thousand first preference votes. Seven of them were last in their constituencies and forfeited their deposits. On 28 August 1927, the party issued a statement supporting Fianna Fáil, and ceased political activity.
