= The Illustrated Police News =

British weekly newspaper, 1864 to 1938

- Front cover from 1871 depicting the Eltham Murder
- Type: Weekly newspaper
- Format: Tabloid
- Founded: 1864
- Ceased publication: 1938
- Headquarters: London

The Illustrated Police News was a weekly illustrated newspaper which was one of the earliest British tabloids. It featured sensational and melodramatic reports and illustrations of murders and hangings and was a direct descendant of the execution broadsheets of the 18th century.

== History ==
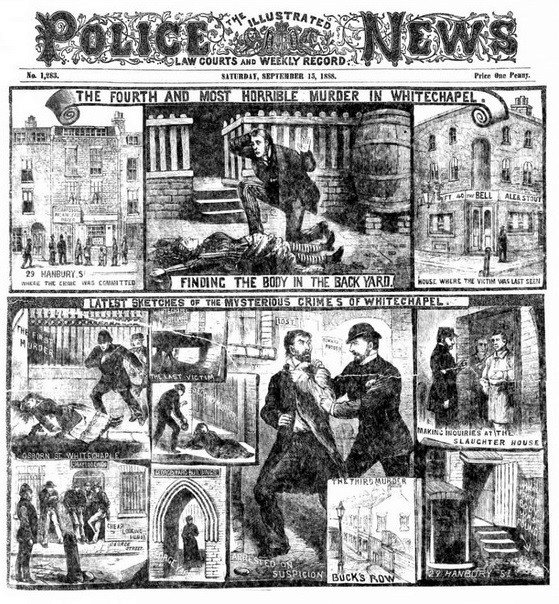
15 September 1888 edition of The Illustrated Police News depicting the discovery of the body of the second canonical Jack the Ripper victim, Annie Chapman

The Illustrated Police News, first published in 1864, was inspired by The Illustrated London News, which had been launched in 1842 and revealed that newspapers with illustrations could achieve high sales. It appeared in literature as early as Chapter 14 of Charles Dickens' 1864-1865 Our Mutual Friend, in which Sloppy states "I used to give Mrs Higden the Police-news in different voices".

Its standards of illustration and tone were reminiscent of an earlier publication, The Newgate Calendar, and the popular "penny dreadfuls". It gained a reputation for sensationalism during the Jack the Ripper murders of 1888.

Around the turn of the 20th century The Illustrated Police News ran numerous articles dealing with the "alien immigration question" that promoted xenophobic attitudes and paranoia amongst its mostly working-class readership.

Due to its detailed descriptions of violent and some-times disturbing crimes, it was banned in Ireland by the Committee on Evil Literature in 1926. The Illustrated Police News ceased publication in 1938.
