= McGee v The Attorney General =

Irish constitutional case on marital privacy

McGee v. Attorney General
- Coat of arms of Ireland
- Court: Supreme Court of Ireland
- Full case name: Mary McGee v. The Attorney General and the Revenue Commissioners
- Decided: 19 December 1973
- Citation: [1974] I.R. 284

Case history
- Appealed from: High Court (O'Keeffe P.), 31 July 1972

Court membership
- Judges sitting: FitzGerald C.J., Walsh, Budd, Henchy and Griffin J.J.

Case opinions
- Decision by: Walsh, Budd, Henchy and Griffin J.J.
- Dissent: FitzGerald C.J.

Keywords
- Contraception; Privacy

McGee v The Attorney General [1973] IR 284 is a landmark judgment of the Irish Supreme Court in 1973 on marital privacy. By a decision of 4 to 1, the court conferred upon spouses a broad right to privacy in marital affairs.

== Background ==
May McGee was a 27-year-old mother of four, including twins, at the time of the case. McGee's second and third pregnancies were complicated by severe cerebral thrombosis. Also during her pregnancies she suffered from a stroke and temporary paralysis. Her condition was such that she was advised by her physician that if she would become pregnant again her life would be endangered. She was then instructed to use a diaphragm and spermicidal jelly that was prescribed to her. However, section 17 of the Criminal Law Amendment Act 1935 prohibited the importation of these devices and they were seized by customs. McGee and her husband Shay decided to challenge the law.

== Ruling ==
The Supreme Court ruled by a 4 to 1 majority in favour of May McGee, after determining that married couples have the constitutional right to make private decisions on family planning.

== Commemoration ==
A mosaic celebrating May McGee and her legal challenge was unveiled in August 2025 in Floraville Gardens at Skerries, County Dublin.

== See also ==
- Griswold v. Connecticut
