= Committee on Evil Literature =

1926 Irish Censorship Enquiry

The Committee on Evil Literature was a committee set up by the Irish Free State's Department of Justice in 1926 to look into censorship of printed matter.

After independence in 1922, the authorities of the Irish Free State came under increasing pressure to ban materials considered obscene or liable to corrupt public morals. In October 1925, the Minister for Justice, Kevin O'Higgins, told Dáil Éireann that existing obscenity laws were sufficient and the government had no right to further interfere with people's personal freedom. He received heavy criticism for these remarks and mounting public pressure persuaded him, on 12 February 1926, to appoint a departmental committee, the Committee on Evil Literature, to consider and report "whether it is necessary or advisable in the interest of the public morality to extend the existing powers of the State to prohibit or restrict the sale and circulation of printed matter".

== 1926 committee ==
The committee of three laymen and two clergymen, one Roman Catholic and one Church of Ireland, met at 24 Kildare Street, Dublin, between February and December 1926 to hear and consider submissions from a variety of sources, including the Garda, secular and religious organisations and members of the public, and reported to O'Higgins on 28 December. Its findings were that existing laws were inadequate to deal with obscene material and that the state had a duty to enforce controls on the production and distribution of obscene and "morally corrupting" literature. It also recommended the establishment of a censorship board.

The opinions of the committee, and those who submitted evidence to it on what should be banned, ranged very widely. Publications that the Roman Catholic Church considered to be obscene included the newspapers News of the World, The People, Sunday Chronicle and Daily Mail, and the magazines Vogue, Woman's Weekly, Woman's World, Illustrated Police News and most girls' picture papers. The objection to the more populist newspapers appears to have been that their detailed reporting of murders and other violent crimes depraved the readers. All birth control literature was also considered to be obscene. Other examples of obscene literature submitted to the committee ranged from photographs of dancers to advertisements for depilatory cream.

The Committee on Evil Literature ceased to exist once its report was completed and presented to the Minister for Justice on 28 December 1926.

== 1929 Censorship of Publications Board ==
The Censorship of Publications Board was established under the Censorship of Publications Act 1929, and the scope of its work was expanded by two further acts in 1946 and 1967.

== See also ==
- Censorship in the Republic of Ireland
- Index Librorum Prohibitorum
