= Irish Family Planning Association =

Irish charity

The Irish Family Planning Association (IFPA) is an Irish charity working to enable people to make informed choices about sexuality and reproduction. The organisation promotes the right of all people to sexual and reproductive health information as well as dedicated, confidential and affordable healthcare services.

== Early history ==
The availability of contraception was illegal in the Irish Free State (later Ireland) from 1935 until 1980, when it was legalised with strong restrictions, later loosened.

Ireland's first family planning clinic, the Fertility Guidance Company Ltd (later to change its name to the IFPA), was established by seven volunteers in Merrion Square, Dublin, in 1969. Among the founder-members were Michael Solomons, a gynaecologist, Dermot Hourihane, a pathologist, James Loughran, Joan Wilson, and Robert Towers (editor of the Irish Medical Times). The organisation sidestepped the law by providing contraception for free and clients then making a "donation". In September 1970 doctors at the clinic begin fitting IUDs for the first time in the Irish Republic.

By the end of 1970 the association was holding six clinics a week. They had acquired eleven doctors including another gynaecologist, Rosemary Jordan, sixteen lay workers, an extra nurse, a financial administrator, a waiting list of three to four weeks, and had seen 1180 new patients. There was difficulty in obtaining contraceptives; Joyce Neill, Chairwoman of the Northern Ireland Family Planning Association, helped by arranging that doctors who lived near the border would drive across into Donegal and post contraceptives to Dublin.

In 1970 Dr. Michael Solomons was invited by two professors at Trinity College to lecture on family planning to medical students as part of their pharmacology courses. It was the first time that an Irish medical school had included the subject as a part of the curriculum.

== Historical developments ==
On 22 May 1971, with the support of the IFPA, a group of Irish feminists travelled to Belfast by rail and made their return to Dublin laden with contraceptive devices as a statement on the illogicality of the law. The event caused a sensation in the media in Ireland and spurred public debate on the topic.

In December 1971 Family Planning – A Guide for Parents and Prospective Parents, a booklet written by three members of the IFPA Education Committee, Drs. Loughran, Nowlan, and Towers, was published. It became extremely popular and thousands of copies were distributed over the following years.

In late 1975 the Galway Family Planning Association was set up, which was at the centre of a highly publicised controversy involving the Fine Gael TD Fintan Coogan, Fianna Fáil mayor Mary Byrne and Deirdre Manifold, convenor of a public rosary crusade, on one side, and staff and medical students of what was then known as University College Galway (UCG) on the other. Amongst those supporting the presence of a family-planning clinic were Michael D. Higgins, then a lecturer, and Eamon Gilmore, then a graduate student. Members of the student union claimed that Opus Dei had co-ordinated the opposition to the clinic. The clinic opened on Raleigh Row on 21 July 1977, with Tuam GP Dr John Waldron becoming one of the first volunteer doctors.

In November 1976, the Censorship of Publications Board banned the IFPA's booklet Family Planning – A Guide for Parents and Prospective Parents - the Board considered the booklet "indecent or obscene". Victor Bewley, Maurice E. Dockrell TD and Senator Evelyn Owens headed an appeal fund to go to court where the ban was rescinded.

In 1978 the Health (Family Planning) Bill was introduced by Charles Haughey. This bill limited the provision of contraceptives, by medical prescription only and by a pharmacist, to bona fide "family planning or for adequate medical reasons". This was largely interpreted to mean that only married couples were legally entitled to access contraception. Chairperson of the IFPA, Dr Andrew Rynne, was the first person to be prosecuted under this law, for selling condoms to a patient in 1983 (on a weekend, when the pharmacies were closed).

In 1988 the Irish Supreme Court barred family-planning clinics from telling pregnant women that lawful abortions are available in England. At that time about 5,000 Irish women were travelling abroad each year to have abortions.

In 1991, the IFPA was fined IR£700 for selling condoms in the Virgin Megastore in Dublin, in contravention of the legislation which restricted sale of contraceptives to pharmacies and other approved outlets.

The X Case was a 1992 Irish Supreme Court judgment which established the right of Irish women to an abortion if a pregnant woman's life was at risk because of pregnancy, including the risk of suicide. On the strength of this ruling, the IFPA set up a non-directive pregnancy counselling service in partnership with the British Pregnancy Advisory Service.

In 2005 the IFPA sued Ireland's government at the European Court of Human Rights on behalf of three women who traveled overseas that year for abortions: an Irish woman who had four previous children placed in state care, an Irish woman who didn't want to become a single mother, and a Lithuanian woman living in Ireland who was in remission from a rare form of cancer. The IFPA supported the women on the right to privacy under article 8 ECHR. In 2010 the court found that Ireland had violated the Convention by failing to provide an accessible and effective procedure by which a woman can have established whether she qualifies for a legal abortion under current Irish law. The court ordered Ireland to pay the Lithuanian woman €15,000 ($20,000) in damages and said Irish doctors must be given clear legal guidance on the eligibility rules for abortions. In an 11-6 verdict, the 17 Strasbourg judges said Ireland was wrong to keep the legal situation unclear and said the Irish government had offered no credible explanation for its failure.

In 2010 the IFPA was awarded the Pearl of Wisdom Award, which is given by the European Cervical Cancer Association to individuals and groups that have made exceptional efforts to prevent cervical cancer in their communities.

The most recent statistics show that 4,149 Irish women had abortions in Britain in 2011. This is a ten-year low at a time where the birth rate is at a historic high.

== Departments ==
The IFPA has the following departments:

- Medical Department, which runs family planning clinics.
- Counselling Department, which offers professional crisis-pregnancy counselling.
- Education & Training Department, which provides specialist training courses.
- Advocacy & Communications Department, which deals with media, public relations and policy.

== International affiliations ==
The IFPA is affiliated with:

- International Planned Parenthood Federation
- United Nations Population Fund
- The European NGOs for Sexual and Reproductive Health and Rights, Population and Development
- The European Parliamentary Forum on Population and Development

== Publications ==
The Irish Journey - Women's Stories of Abortion. IFPA, Dublin, 2000.

== See also ==
- Contraception in the Republic of Ireland
- A, B and C v Ireland
