= William Magennis =

Irish politician and academic (1867–1946)

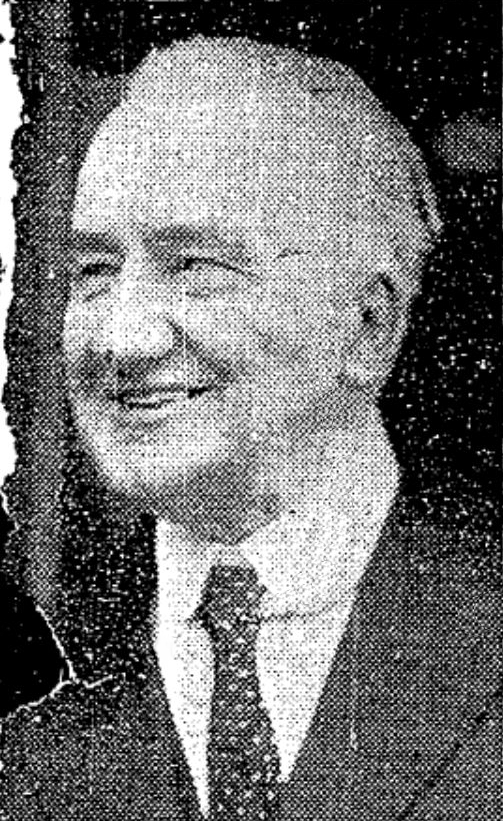
- Magennis in 1946

Senator
- In office 27 April 1938 – 30 March 1946
- Constituency: Nominated by the Taoiseach

Teachta Dála
- In office June 1922 – June 1927
- Constituency: National University

Personal details
- Born: 18 May 1867 County Down, Ireland
- Died: 30 March 1946 (aged 78) Dublin, Ireland
- Party: Independent
- Other political affiliations: Cumann na nGaedheal; Clann Éireann
- Spouse: Jane Magennis
- Education: University College Dublin

William Magennis (18 May 1867 – 30 March 1946) was an Irish politician and university professor.

== Early and personal life ==
Born in Belfast, he was educated at Belvedere College, Dublin, and University College Dublin (UCD). In 1893 he was called to the Bar. He was professor of philosophy at Carysfort College and he held the Chair of Metaphysics at UCD.

== Political career ==
Magennis was first elected to Dáil Éireann as an Independent Teachta Dála (TD) for the National University constituency at the 1922 general election. He was elected as a Cumann na nGaedheal TD for the same constituency at the 1923 general election.

In 1926, he was one of the founders of a new political party called Clann Éireann. The party advocated the abolition of the Oath of Allegiance to the British King, called for lower taxes and less legislation and was critical of the 1925 Boundary Commission agreement. The party attracted little support and it did not win any seats at the June 1927 general election, including the loss of Magennis's seat. He was nominated by the Taoiseach to the 2nd Seanad in 1938 and served as an independent member until his death in 1946.

== Views on censorship of films and books ==
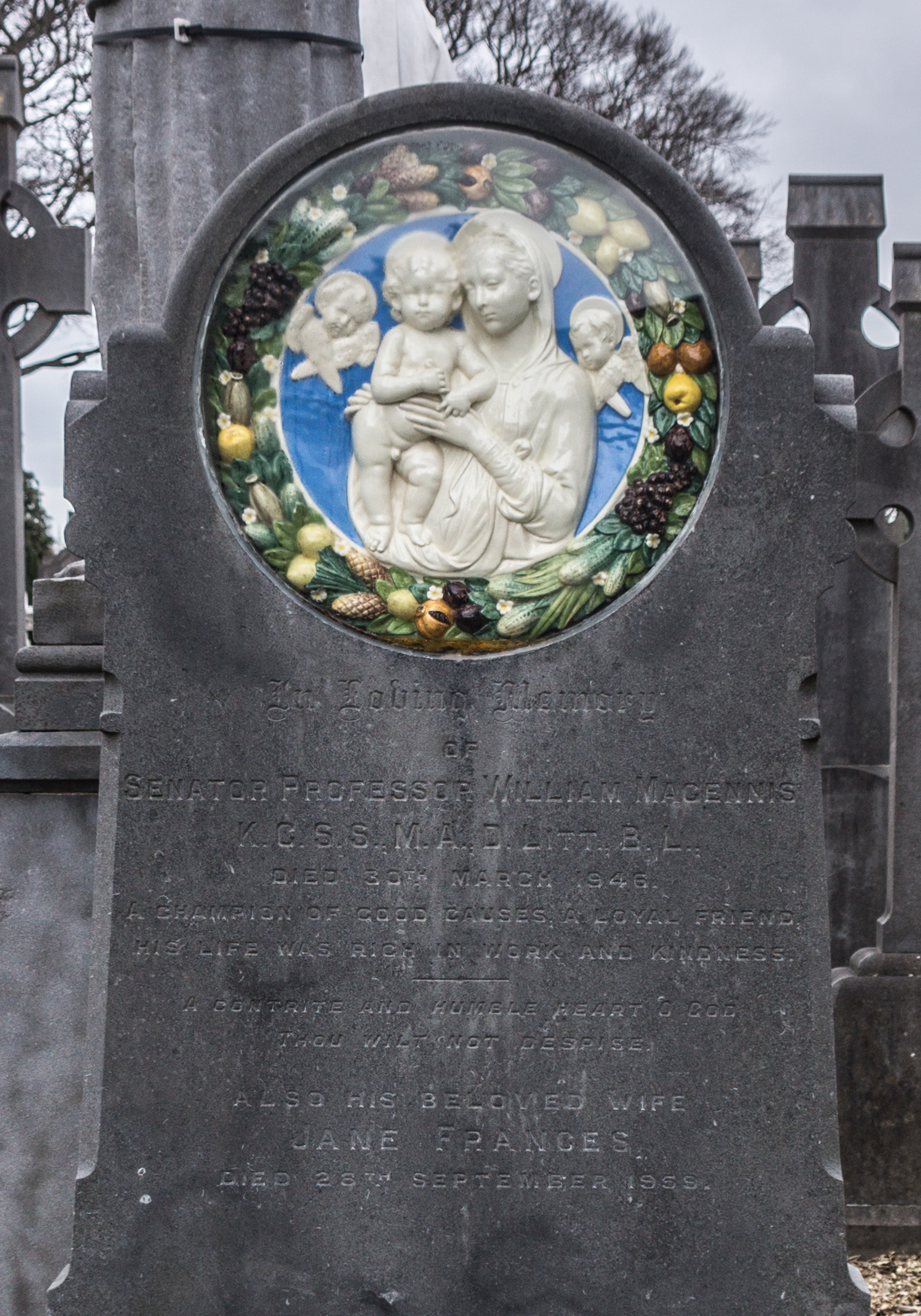
Magennis's gravestone in Dublin

Speaking during the debate of the 1923 Censorship of Films Act, which was one of the first pieces of significant legislation to be passed by the Irish Free State. Magennis declared: "Purity of mind and sanity of outlook upon life were long ago regarded as characteristic of our people. The loose views and the vile lowering of values that belong to other races and other peoples were being forced upon our people through the popularity of the cinematograph".

In 1942 Magennis spoke against the publication of obscene books such as The Tailor and Ansty, adding that his moral standards "... do not date back to Queen Victoria's days; they date back to Moses. The standards under which we operate go back to 1,500 years or so before Christ. If the Senator cares to accuse us of being old-fashioned, I am pleading guilty: I am so old-fashioned as to take my standards of life and conduct from Mount Sinai and not from Seán This and Seán That, whose books have been banned."

In the ensuing debates it emerged that, while Magennis disapproved of sodomy, he did not know what it was. His opponent Senator John Keane pointed out that two men embracing in Land of Spices did not amount to sodomy, adding: "I think he might have used something less strong".

Dáil	Election	Deputy (Party)	Deputy (Party)	Deputy (Party)	Deputy (Party)
1st	1918	Eoin MacNeill (SF)	1 seat under 1918 Act		
2nd	1921	Eoin MacNeill (SF)	Ada English (SF)	Michael Hayes (SF)	William Stockley (SF)
3rd	1922	Eoin MacNeill (PT-SF)	William Magennis (Ind.)	Michael Hayes (Note: Michael Hayes served as Ceann Comhairle from 9 September 1922 to 29 January 1932.) (PT-SF)	William Stockley (AT-SF)
4th	1923	Eoin MacNeill (CnaG)	William Magennis (CnaG)	Michael Hayes (CnaG)	3 seats from 1923
4th	1923 by-election	Patrick McGilligan (CnaG)	William Magennis (CnaG)	Michael Hayes (CnaG)	3 seats from 1923
5th	1927 (Jun)	Patrick McGilligan (CnaG)	Arthur Clery (Ind.)	Michael Hayes (CnaG)	3 seats from 1923
6th	1927 (Sep)	Patrick McGilligan (CnaG)	Michael Tierney (CnaG)	Michael Hayes (CnaG)	3 seats from 1923
7th	1932	Patrick McGilligan (CnaG)	Conor Maguire (FF)	Michael Hayes (CnaG)	3 seats from 1923
8th	1933	Patrick McGilligan (CnaG)	Conor Maguire (FF)	Helena Concannon (FF)	3 seats from 1923
8th	1936	Patrick McGilligan (CnaG)	(Vacant)	Helena Concannon (FF)	3 seats from 1923
