= Eric Cross (writer) =

Irish writer

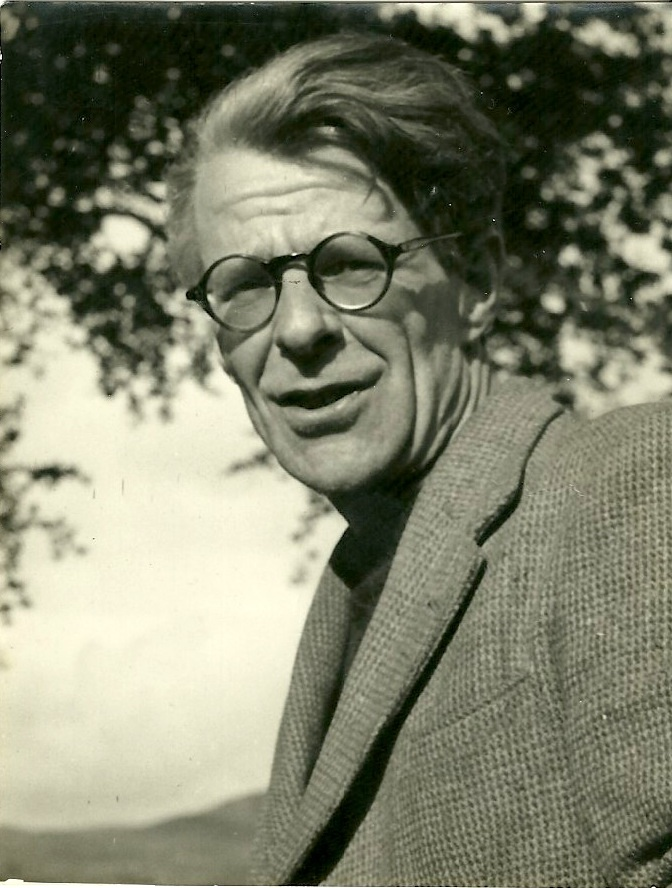
- Born: 1903/1905; Newry, County Down, Ireland
- Died: 5 September 1980; County Mayo

Eric Cross (1903/1905 – 5 September 1980) was an Irish writer and broadcaster.

== Early life and family ==
Eric Cross was born in Newry, County Down in 1903 or 1905. His father was a British civil servant, James Cross. Cross was an only child, though his Irish Times obituary stated that he was survived by a sister. He stated in 1976 that he had no memory of County Down and very few memories of his father. He recalled his childhood with his mother, and that she had been a nurse in South Africa. Cross attended numerous schools in northern England from age 10. He entered Manchester University where he studied medicine for 6 months before transferring to study chemistry in London.

== Career ==
After Cross graduated, he authored a chemistry textbook, and worked in biochemical industry for 15 years. The writer Benedict Kiely alleged that Cross was working on projects related to chemical warfare, and decided to leave to become a writer. Cross moved to Ireland in 1936, first living in Dublin. He supposedly bought a caravan and horse, taking 6 weeks to travel to Gougane Barra, County Cork, where he lived in the caravan. He ate at a local hotel.

He published The Tailor and Ansty, in The Bell in 1942 as a collection of stories and sayings from an old country tailor and seanchaí called Timothy Buckley and his wife Anastasia that Cross had recorded. This was later issued as an expanded book with a foreword by Frank O'Connor. He had first met the couple in the 1920s, and it is thought he moved to Gougane Barra to live close to them. It was well received critically, but was denounced by the catholic dean of Cork and who also accused Cross of being a freemason. The book was banned by the Censorship Board on 28 September 1942 during the government of Éamon de Valera possibly due to the uncensored references by the couple to animal reproduction. Some neighbours were furious and Buckley was forced by three priests to go on his knees and burn the book in his own fireplace. Following the liberalisation of the censorship laws in the 1960s, Cross' book was the first to have the ban rescinded. In 1968, P. J. O'Connor adapted it for the stage, and it was performed in the Peacock Theatre. It has been restaged a number of times since.

Cross invented a method of making turf as durable as coal, and created "magnastone" a new substance with the appearance of marble. In 1968, he published Map of time, a world history with a focus on Ireland from 400 AD. During World War II, Cross devised a method for making knitting needles from bicycle wheel spokes, and made platform shoes using the rejected bungs of Beamish porter barrels. He moved to Cloona Lodge, near Westport, County Mayo in 1953, where he taught the children of Joseph and Sonia Kelly.

Cross was one of the contributors of spoken essays to the RTÉ Radio series Sunday Miscellany and short stories for the BBC. Silence is Golden, a selection of stories and essays by Cross, appeared in 1978.

== Death and legacy ==
Cross lived a secluded life in County Mayo. He died on 5 September 1980. Sean O'Faolain compared Cross' book to other Irish rural literature classics, including The islandman and Twenty years a-growing. Vivian Mercier had less praise, and since its publication it has received little critical attention.

== See also ==
- Jude the Obscure
