= Sir John Keane, 5th Baronet =

Irish barrister and politician (1873–1956)

Sir John Keane, Bt
- Keane in 1920

Senator
- In office 27 April 1938 – 21 April 1948
- Constituency: Nominated by the Taoiseach

Senator
- In office 11 December 1922 – 12 December 1934

Personal details
- Born: 3 June 1873 Cappoquin, County Waterford, Ireland
- Died: 30 January 1956 (aged 82) Dublin, Ireland
- Party: Independent
- Spouse: Eleanor Hicks Beach (m. 1907)
- Children: 4
- Education: Royal Military Academy Woolwich
- Profession: Barrister, Soldier

Sir John Keane, 5th Baronet, DSO (3 June 1873 – 30 January 1956) was an Irish barrister and politician.

== Early life ==
Keane was the son of Sir Richard Keane, 4th Baronet and Adelaide Vance, daughter of John Vance MP. He was educated at Clifton College and Royal Military Academy Woolwich. He succeeded his father as 5th Baronet in 1892 and was appointed High Sheriff of County Waterford for 1911–1912. He was a member of Seanad Éireann and a director of Bank of Ireland becoming Governor (chairman) from 1941 to 1943.

== Military career ==
Keane was commissioned into the Royal Field Artillery as a second lieutenant on 17 June 1893, and was promoted to lieutenant on 17 June 1896. He served in South Africa during the Second Boer War, during which he was promoted to captain on 18 June 1900. For his service in this war he was mentioned in despatches (London Gazette 10 September 1901) and received the Queen's South Africa Medal. In October 1902, Keane was seconded as staff officer and appointed aide-de-camp to Sir Henry Arthur Blake, Governor and Commander-in-Chief of Hong Kong.

During World War I, he was mentioned in despatches, awarded the Distinguished Service Order (London Gazette 14 January 1916) and the French Legion of Honour (London Gazette 14 July 1917). He ended the war as a Lieutenant-Colonel in the Royal Tank Corps.

== Senate career ==
Before the creation of the Irish Free State in 1922, Keane had worked with the IAOS, served on Waterford County Council and was a member of the All-for-Ireland League that supported Home Rule.

In 1922, Sir John was nominated by the President of the Executive Council to Seanad Éireann of the Irish Free State, and served until 1934. In 1923 his home at Cappoquin House was burned by anti-government forces in the Irish Civil War, which he then rebuilt. He later served in the reconstituted Seanad Éireann established by the Constitution of Ireland, serving from 1938 to 1948 on the nomination of the Taoiseach. It has been said that, by this time, he was "widely regarded as the quintessence of intelligent ex-unionism".

In 1925 he was a major opponent of the Shannon hydroelectric scheme, describing it as "the poisonous virus of nationalisation".

=== Censorship of publications ===
In 1942 he was involved in the first occasion on which the Seanad censored itself. On 18 November 1942, Sir John moved: "That, in the opinion of Seanad Éireann, the Censorship of Publications Board appointed by the Minister for Justice under the Censorship of Publications Act, 1929, has ceased to retain public confidence, and that steps should be taken by the Minister to reconstitute the board." and sparked four days of fierce debate, carrying over to 2, 3, and concluding on 9 December 1942.

He quoted extensively from one book The Tailor and Ansty by Eric Cross, which was banned in Ireland soon after its first publication in that year. The Editor of Debates prudishly excluded the quotation from the Official Report; the entry states only: "The Senator quoted from the book". He taunted William Magennis for thinking that two men embracing in another book amounted to sodomy.

At the end of the debate and much discussion in the public press, his point made, Sir John sought leave to withdraw the motion. The question "That leave be given by the Seanad to withdraw the motion, item No. 2, on the Order Paper" was put and negatived. The question on the main motion was then duly put and declared negatived. However Senators claimed for a division, and the motion was defeated: For 2 votes - Sir John Keane and Joseph Johnston - Against 34 votes.

== Family ==
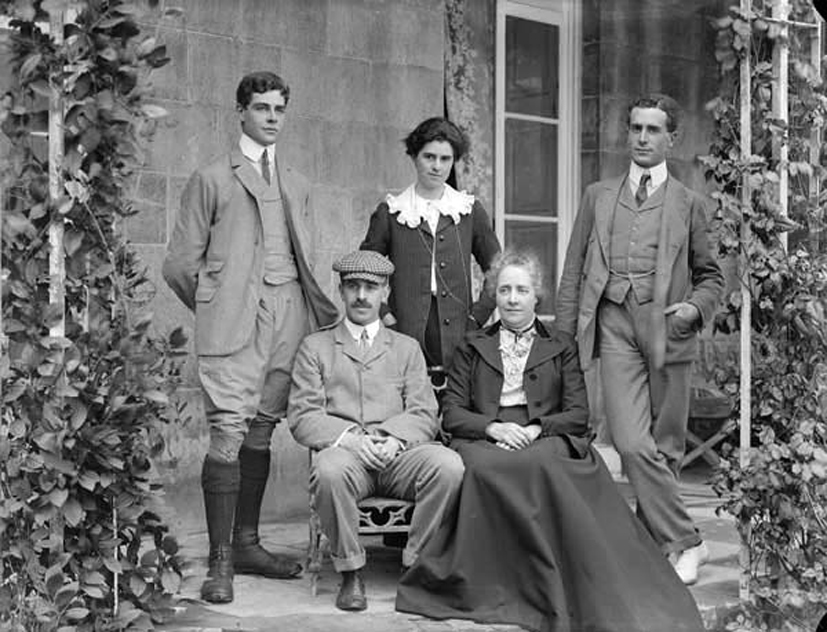
Sir John Keane, seated left, pictured with his family.

In 1907, he married Lady Eleanor Hicks Beach, the eldest daughter of Michael Hicks Beach, 1st Earl St Aldwyn and his second wife Lady Lucy Fortescue, with whom he had one son and three daughters.

== National Portrait Gallery ==
The UK's National Portrait Gallery includes three photographic portraits of Sir John Keane taken by Bassano's studio on 30 March 1920.

Baronetage of Ireland
Preceded by Richard Francis Keane	Baronet (of Cappoquin); 1892–1956	Succeeded by Richard Michael Keane
