= The Tailor and Ansty =

1942 book by Eric Cross

- First edition
- Author: Eric Cross
- Illustrator: Robert Gibbings
- Language: English
- Genre: Biography
- Set in: Ireland
- Published: 1942
- Publisher: Chapman & Hall
- Publication place: Ireland
- Media type: Print: clothbound Octavo
- Pages: 210
- Dewey Decimal: 398
- LC Class: DA925 .C73

The Tailor and Ansty is a memoir by Eric Cross about the life of the Irish tailor and storyteller, Timothy Buckley or Tadhg Ó Buachalla in Irish (1860–1945), and his wife Anastasia ("Ansty" or Ainstí in Irish) Buckley (née McCarthy, (1872–1947)) who lived in Garrynapeaka near Gougane Barra in County Cork. The memoir was first serialised in Seán Ó Faoláin's periodical, The Bell, then published in book form in 1942. It was banned by the Censorship of Publications Board because of its depiction of premarital cohabitation, and its sexual frankness.

== Senate debate ==
The Tailor and Ansty was the subject of four days' debate in December 1942 in Seanad Éireann, Ireland's upper house, in which Buckley was accused of being "sex-obsessed", and his wife of being a "moron". It was said that they were examples of the "sores of moral leprosy" that could "undermine Christianity".

Parts of the Seanad debate were struck from the record because they contained quotes from the book made by Sir John Keane, to determine if they were really obscene or not. Keane also made the point that an opponent, Professor Magennis, did not know what sodomy was. The wider debate concerned the activities of the then "Free State Board of Book Censors", and Keane's motion was defeated on a vote by 34–2.

In his introduction to the 1964 edition, the author Frank O'Connor wrote that Magennis "was a windbag with a nasty streak of malice" and that reading the Senate proceedings was "like a long, slow swim through a sewage bed."

The local clergy arrived at the Buckleys' home, and forced them to burn their copy of the book. Frank O'Connor, who had become an authority on the issue, said that a boycott had been arranged against the couple.

The ban on the book remained in place for 20 years. Before it was reprinted in 1962, copies were unavailable and even the author himself had no copy of it.

== Adaptations ==
The book was adapted for the stage in 1968 by P.J. O'Connor, with Eamon Kelly and Brid Lynch playing the Tailor and his wife.

In 2004, Ronan Wilmot and Nuala Hayes revived the play with Ronan Wilmot playing the Tailor and Nuala Hayes playing Ansty, respectively.

In October 2004, Cónal Creedon wrote a radio adaptation, which was broadcast by Raidió Teilifís Éireann (RTÉ), with a cast of readers headed by Niall Toibin. This production was rebroadcast in May 2007.
