= An Irish solution to an Irish problem =

Idiom in politics denoting shoddiness of a policy

In Irish political discourse, "an Irish solution to an Irish problem" is any official response to a controversial issue which is timid, half-baked, or expedient, which is an unsatisfactory compromise, or sidesteps the fundamental issue.

== Earlier usage ==
The idea had been commonly held that Ireland's problems should be addressed by solutions developed in Ireland, rather than based on foreign models; this was sometimes expressed using some variant of the anaphora "an Irish solution to an Irish problem". Examples of the rhetorical device include:

- Eamonn Cooney said about unemployment in 1931: "There is no Irish attitude being adopted towards Irish problems. As the leader of this Party has stated, there is an Irish solution for these problems."
- The president of the Irish Medical Association said of the Mother and Child Scheme in 1954: "if we want a health service we will not get it by aping the Socialists, Monarchists or Communists of other countries. We believe that there is an Irish solution to an Irish problem."
- Tom O'Higgins said about health insurance in 1956: "May I express the hope that we will try more consistently to bring about an Irish solution to our own problems without seeking merely to apply here something they have done successfully or otherwise elsewhere?"
- Conor Cruise O'Brien said about the Northern Ireland troubles in 1970: "Unless one can see it as an Irish quarrel, it is not possible to bring about an Irish solution for it or even to begin moving towards that."
- Patrick Hillery said about EEC accession in 1971: "Different applicants have different problems. The Irish solution to the Irish problem is what we should look for. The Norwegian solution would not suit us as well as our own. Neither would the British solution."
- Ajai Chopra, the head of the IMF's mission to Ireland, described the 2010 intervention of the EU-IMF-ECB troika as a lifeline that presents 'an Irish solution to Irish problems.'

The same device has been used in other countries. Sargent Shriver called the Opportunities Industrialization Center "an American solution to an American problem" in 1967; Hillary Clinton described her 1993 health care plan as "an American solution for an American problem by creating an American health care system that works for America." In 1977, Hector Laing of United Biscuits cautioned against applying its work practices at its American subsidiary Keebler Company by calling them "a British solution to a British problem."

== Health (Family Planning) Act 1979 ==
Contraception had been prohibited in the Republic of Ireland since 1935. However, the Supreme Court ruled in 1973 that married couples had a constitutional right to privacy which encompassed family planning. In 1974, Minister for Justice Patrick Cooney introduced a bill to accommodate this, but it was defeated on a free vote in which Taoiseach Liam Cosgrave was among those opposing it. Fianna Fáil came to power after the 1977 election, and Charles Haughey became Minister for Health. He introduced a bill — subsequently the Health (Family Planning) Act 1979— to allow contraceptives to be available, only by medical prescription, "for the purpose, bona fide, of family planning or for adequate medical reasons". Physicians and pharmacists who had moral objections would not be obliged to write or fill such prescriptions.

Introducing the second reading of the bill in Dáil Éireann on 28 February 1979, Haughey concluded:

I hope Deputies will accept that this Bill is the result of careful and earnest consideration of a difficult situation and that it is a sincere attempt to meet that situation in a reasonable and acceptable manner. There is very little support for a situation in which all forms of artificial contraceptives could be ... freely available ... We must, on the other hand, [follow] the Supreme Court decision in the McGee case ... It is not easy to devise legislation which satisfies both these criteria. ...

I recognise that this legislation will not satisfy everybody. There is no legislation which would. There are diametrically opposing views sincerely held on practically every aspect of this issue. ...

This legislation opens no flood-gates, ...

It provides that who find the provisions unacceptable need not involve themselves in any way. This Bill seeks to provide an Irish solution to an Irish problem. I have not regarded it as necessary that we should conform to the position obtaining in any other country.

I commend the Bill to Deputies on the basis that it will be found acceptable by and meet the wishes of the great majority of sensible responsible citizens.

—

Haughey was using the phrase "an Irish solution to an Irish problem" in the same approbatory sense as before. In the ensuing Dáil debate, Fianna Fáil TDs Kit Ahern and Niall Andrews quoted Haughey's description approvingly in supporting the Bill. However, liberal opponents of the 1979 Act quoted Haughey's words ironically and derisively in subsequent criticism, bringing a permanent change to the meaning of the phrase. Noël Browne said:

The Minister made the remarkable statement that this Bill was an Irish solution to an Irish problem. That was one of the unwisest statements of all made about the Bill. Some Deputies said that the Bill is more concerned with protecting the political interests of Fianna Fáil than it is with protecting women from unwanted pregnancies. ... This is the Catholic Irish republican solution to the Irish problem in the Twenty-six Counties

—

The Minister said the Bill was guided by certain principles and I suppose that is what he meant when he described it as an Irish solution to an Irish problem; a Roman Catholic solution to an Irish problem.

—

Barry Desmond said:

Nobody knows more of the fundamental inbuilt hypocrisy in this Bill than the Minister for Health. The fact that we know it means that we dodge it and come back to the Minister with the stock response "An Irish Bill for the Irish situation." Irish women have some unique aspects of sexuality unknown in other European countries. Irish men possess unique aspects of sexuality unknown to other males in Europe. Therefore, we must have a uniquely Irish solution to the problem.

—

Finally he coined for all time the unique comment that this Bill "seeks to provide an Irish solution to an Irish problem". This stretches too far the extent of my personal credulity.

—

Jim O'Keeffe said:

The Minister, in introducing the Bill, said he sought an Irish solution to an Irish problem. In my opinion this Bill is tinged with hypocrisy and loaded with double-think and is no credit to this House or the party who produced it. ... Of course, there may be a way out—again, an Irish way out, a typically Irish solution to an Irish problem. If the doctor is prepared to issue a prescription and to go through the pretence that the prescription is for medical purposes and not for family planning purposes, that would be a way round the problem. But, if this is so, why should we have this sham and pretence?

—

John Kelly said:

If I am contradicted on that and told by the Minister that I am not doing this Bill full justice, that his Irish solution for an Irish problem is meant to be taken more seriously, I am tempted to reply that the peculiarly Irish nature of the solution lies in the fact that many people on the Minister's side will be content with the appearance of the law even though there is no reality. That is Irish enough and appeals to a certain stratum of Irish mentality abundantly represented in the Fianna Fáil Party—go through the motions and whether the reality follows in the wake of the motions we need not care; so long as we have a badge in our buttonholes and can speak a few perfunctory words, we shall be taken to have our hearts in the right place whatever the context refers to. I believe that is what is meant here. There is a certain sense in the Minister talking about an Irish solution to an Irish problem. The Irish solution is to appear to solve the problem. The reality is that it will remain exactly the same in a year's time as it has been for the last couple of years. ... I think the Minister was Minister for Justice when the licensing law was changed in 1960 or thereabouts. Up to that time there had been a traffic in bona fides—that was a cynical term—but it was an Irish solution to an Irish problem in a big way. There was an appearance of there being a law in regard to bona fide travellers. The reality was exactly the opposite and so well recognised was the opposite quality to the reality that the bona fide name was actually cynically, but colloquially and without thinking, bestowed on the very establishments which had the benefit of this Irish solution.

—
