= List of judges of the High Court (Ireland) =

The High Court of Ireland is a court which deals at first instance with the most serious and important civil and criminal cases. The High Court is composed of its president, 42 ordinary judges, and additional judges being ex officio the Chief Justice, the President of the Court of Appeal, the President of the Circuit Court, and former chief justices and courts presidents who remain judges.

== Current members ==
| Name | Appointed | Notes |
|---|---|---|
| David Barniville | 2017–2021, 2022– | President since 2022 |
| Paul McDermott | 2012 | |
| Anthony Barr | 2013 | |
| David Keane | 2013 | |
| Max Barrett | 2014 | |
| Brian Cregan | 2014 | Sacked |
| Tony Hunt | 2014 | |
| Carmel Stewart | 2014 | |
| Mary Ellen Ring | 2015 | |
| Tony O'Connor | 2015 | |
| Richard Humphreys | 2015 | |
| Michael Twomey | 2016 | |
| Miriam O'Regan | 2016 | |
| Paul Coffey | 2016 | |
| Leonie Reynolds | 2016 | |
| Eileen Creedon | 2017 | |
| Michael Quinn | 2018 | |
| Garrett Simons | 2018 | |
| John Jordan | 2019 | |
| Alexander Owens | 2019 | |
| Mark Sanfey | 2019 | |
| Mary Rose Gearty | 2019 | |
| Mark Heslin | 2019 | |
| Paul Burns | 2020 | |
| Siobhán Stack | 2021 | |
| David Holland | 2021 | |
| Cian Ferriter | 2021 | |
| Emily Egan | 2021 | |
| Caroline Biggs | 2021 | |
| Karen O'Connor | 2021 | |
| Conor Dignam | 2021 | |
| Siobhán Phelan | 2021 | |
| Marguerite Bolger | 2022 | |
| Rory MacCabe | 2022 | |
| Kerida Naidoo | 2022 | |
| Eileen Roberts | 2022 | |
| Melanie Greally | 2022 | |
| Mícheál O'Higgins | 2023 | |
| Rory Mulcahy | 2023 | |
| Emily Farrell | 2023 | |
| Liam Kennedy | 2023 | |
| Siobhán Lankford | 2023 | |
| Barry O'Donnell | 2023 | |
| Oisín Quinn | 2023 | |
| Conleth Bradley | 2023 | |
| Denise Brett | 2023 | |
| Nuala Jackson | 2023 | |
| David Nolan | 2023 | |
| Patrick McGrath | 2023 | |

== Ex-officio members ==
| Name | Since | Notes |
|---|---|---|
| Donal O'Donnell | 2021 | ex officio as Chief Justice |
| Caroline Costello | 2024 | ex officio as President of the Court of Appeal; Previously a member 2007–2014 |
| Patricia Ryan | 2019 | ex officio as President of the Circuit Court |

== Former members ==
- denotes presidents

| Name | Term of office | Notes |
|---|---|---|
| Timothy Sullivan | 1924–1936 | President 1924–1936 |
| James Creed Meredith | 1924–1936 | |
| Thomas O'Shaughnessy | 1924–1925 | Last Recorder of Dublin |
| William E. Wylie | 1924–1936 | |
| William John Johnston | 1924–1939 | |
| James Murnaghan | 1924–1925 | |
| Henry Hanna | 1925–1943 | |
| John O'Byrne | 1926–1940 | |
| Conor Maguire | 1936–1946 | President 1936–1946 |
| George Gavan Duffy | 1936–1951 | President 1946–1951 |
| William Black | 1939–1942 | |
| Martin Maguire | 1940–1954 | |
| Kevin Haugh | 1942–1961 | |
| Andrew Kingsbury Overend | 1943–1947 | |
| Cahir Davitt | 1945–1966 | President 1951–1966 |
| Kevin Dixon | 1946–1959 | |
| T. C. Kingsmill Moore | 1947–1951 | |
| Charles Casey | 1951–1952 | |
| Gardner Budd | 1951–1965 | |
| Richard McLoughlin | 1952–1969 | |
| George D. Murnaghan | 1954–1979 | |
| Thomas Teevan | 1954–1971 | |
| Brian Walsh | 1959–1961 | |
| John Kenny | 1961–1975 | |
| Séamus Henchy | 1962–1972 | |
| Seán Butler | 1966–1980 | |
| Aindrias Ó Caoimh | 1966–1974 | President 1966–1974 |
| Alfred D. Pringle | 1969–1974 | |
| Frank Griffin | 1971–1973 | |
| Thomas Finlay | 1972–1985 | President 1974–1985 |
| John Gannon | 1973–1990 | |
| Tom O'Higgins | 1973–1974 | |
| Kenneth Deale | 1974 | |
| Liam Hamilton | 1974–1994 | President 1985–1994 |
| Weldon Parke | 1974–1976 | |
| Thomas A. Doyle | 1974–1984 | |
| James G. McMahon | 1975–1986 | |
| Herbert R. McWilliam | 1976–1985 | |
| Declan Costello | 1977–1998 | President 1995–1998 |
| James A. D'Arcy | 1977–1986 | |
| Ronan Keane | 1979–1996 | |
| William Ellis | 1979–1983 | |
| Donal Barrington | 1979–1989 | |
| Mella Carroll | 1980–2005 | First female High Court judge |
| Roderick O'Hanlon | 1981–1995 | |
| Edward Walsh | 1981–1982 | |
| Henry Barron | 1982–1997 | |
| Francis Murphy | 1982–1996 | |
| Kevin Lynch | 1984–1996 | |
| Séamus Egan | 1984–1991 | |
| Robert Barr | 1985–2002 | |
| Gerard Lardner | 1985–1993 | |
| John Blayney | 1986–1992 | |
| John McKenzie | 1986–1991 | |
| Richard Johnson | 1987–2009 | President 2006–2009 |
| Frederick Morris | 1990–2001 | President 1998–2001 |
| Vivian Lavan | 1991–2011 | |
| Declan Budd | 1991–2011 | |
| Susan Denham | 1991–1992 | |
| Feargus Flood | 1991–2000 | |
| Paul Carney | 1991–2015 | |
| Hugh Geoghegan | 1992–2000 | |
| Dermot Kinlen | 1993–2002 | |
| Harry Whelehan | 1994 | President 1994 |
| Brian McCracken | 1995–2002 | |
| Mary Laffoy | 1995–2013 | |
| Peter Shanley | 1996–1998 | |
| Catherine McGuinness | 1996–2000 | |
| Thomas C. Smyth | 1996–2008 | |
| Michael Moriarty | 1996–2018 | |
| Diarmuid O'Donovan | 1996–2007 | |
| Peter Kelly | 1996–2014, 2015–2020 | President 2015–2020 |
| Philip O'Sullivan | 1997–2006 | |
| Kevin C. O'Higgins | 1997–2008 | |
| John Quirke | 1997–2012 | |
| Matthew P. Smith | 1998–2004 | |
| Cyril C. Kelly | 1998–1999 | |
| Nicholas Kearns | 1998–2004, 2009–2015 | President 2009–2015 |
| Fidelma Macken | 1998–1999, 2004–2005 | |
| Aindrias Ó Caoimh | 1999–2004 | |
| Iarfhlaith O'Neill | 1999–2014 | |
| Joseph Finnegan | 1999–2001 | President 2001–2006 |
| Roderick Murphy | 2000–2013 | |
| Liam McKechnie | 2000–2010 | |
| Daniel Herbert | 2000–2014 | |
| Paul Butler | 2000–2018 | |
| Henry Abbott | 2002–2017 | |
| Éamon de Valera | 2002–2014 | |
| Mary Finlay Geoghegan | 2002–2014 | |
| Michael Peart | 2002–2014 | |
| Barry White | 2002–2014 | |
| Paul Gilligan | 2003–2018 | |
| Seán O'Leary | 2003–2006 | |
| Sean Ryan | 2003–2014 | First President of the Court of Appeal |
| Frank Clarke | 2004–2012 | |
| John MacMenamin | 2004–2012 | |
| Elizabeth Dunne | 2004–2013 | |
| Michael Hanna | 2004–2023 | |
| Kevin Feeney | 2005–2013 | |
| Peter Charleton | 2006–2014 | |
| Maureen Harding Clark | 2006–2014 | |
| John Cooke | 2008–2013 | |
| Brian McGovern | 2006–2018 | |
| John Hedigan | 2007–2016 | |
| George Birmingham | 2007–2014 | |
| John Edwards | 2007–2014 | |
| Garrett Sheehan | 2007–2014 | |
| Bryan MacMahon | 2007–2011 | |
| Patrick J. McCarthy | 2007–2018 | |
| Mary Irvine | 2007–2014, 2020–2022 | President 2020–2022 |
| Daniel O'Keeffe | 2008–2013 | |
| Gerard Hogan | 2010–2014 | |
| Kevin Cross | 2011–2021 | |
| Michael White | 2011–2021 | |
| Iseult O'Malley | 2012–2015 | |
| Colm Mac Eochaidh | 2012–2017 | |
| Marie Baker | 2013–2018 | |
| Carroll Moran | 2014–2015 | |
| Raymond Fullam | 2014–2017 | |
| Caroline Costello | 2014–2018 | |
| Aileen Donnelly | 2014–2019 | |
| Mary Faherty | 2014–2019 | |
| Robert Haughton | 2014–2019 | |
| Seamus Noonan | 2014–2019 | |
| Donald Binchy | 2014–2020 | |
| Teresa Pilkington | 2014–2020 | |
| Bernard Barton | 2014–2021 | |
| Bronagh O'Hanlon | 2014–2021 | |
| Robert Eagar | 2014–2022 | |
| Deirdre Murphy | 2014–2023 | |
| Margaret Heneghan | 2015–2017 | |
| Isobel Kennedy | 2015–2018 | |
| Úna Ní Raifeartaigh | 2016–2019 | |
| Charles Meenan | 2017–2023 | |
| Senan Allen | 2018–2022 | |
| Tara Burns | 2018–2023 | |
| Brian O'Moore | 2019–2023 | |
| Nuala Butler | 2020–2022 | |
| Niamh Hyland | 2019–2024 | |
| Michael MacGrath | 2018–2024 | |
| Denis McDonald | 2018–2024 | |
| Brian Cregan | 2014-2026 | |

== See also ==
- List of judges of the Supreme Court of Ireland
- List of judges of the Court of Appeal of Ireland
