= List of judges of the Supreme Court of Ireland =

- Liosta Breithiúna Chúirt Uachtarach na hÉireann
- Established: 29 December 1937
- Jurisdiction: Ireland
- Authorised by: Constitution of Ireland, Article 34
- Judge term length: Until aged 70, 7 years for Chief Justice
- Number of positions: 10 and 2 ex officio members
- Website: www.supremecourt.ie

The Supreme Court of Ireland is the highest judicial authority in Ireland. The following is a list of current and former judges of the court.

== Current members ==
Name	Appointed	Notes
Donal O'Donnell	March 2010	Chief Justice since October 2021
Iseult O'Malley	October 2015	
Séamus Woulfe	July 2020	
Gerard Hogan	October 2021	
Brian Murray	February 2022	
Maurice Collins	November 2022	
Aileen Donnelly	June 2023	
Niamh Hyland	April 2026	
Brian O'Moore	April 2026	
Caroline Costello	July 2024	ex officio 2024–present
David Barniville	July 2022	ex officio 2022–present

== Former members ==
- denotes Chief Justices

Name	Birth–Death	Term of office	Chief Justice	Notes
Hugh Kennedy	1879–1936	1924–1936	1924–1936	First Chief Justice
Gerald Fitzgibbon	1866–1942	1924–1938	—	
Charles O'Connor	1854–1928	1924–1925	—	Last Master of the Rolls 1912–1924
Timothy Sullivan	1874–1949	1924–1946	1936–1946	ex officio as President of the High Court 1924–1936
James Murnaghan	1881–1973	1925–1953	—	
James Geoghegan	1886–1951	1936–1950	—	
Conor Maguire	1889–1971	1936–1961	1946–1961	ex officio 1936–1946
James Creed Meredith	1875–1942	1936–1942	—	
William John Johnston	1868–1940	1939–1940	—	
John O'Byrne	1884–1954	1940–1954	—	
William Black	1879–1967	1942–1951	—	
George Gavan Duffy	1882–1951	1946–1951	—	ex officio 1946–1951
Cecil Lavery	1894–1973	1950–1966	—	
Cahir Davitt	1894–1986	1951–1966	—	ex officio 1951–1966
T. C. Kingsmill Moore	1893–1979	1951–1966	—	
Cearbhall Ó Dálaigh	1911–1978	1953–1973	1961–1973	
Martin Maguire		1954–1961	—	
Kevin Haugh	1901–1969	1961–1969	—	
Brian Walsh	1918–1998	1961–1990	—	
Gardner Budd	1904–1976	1966–1975	—	
William Fitzgerald	1906–1974	1966–1974	1973–1974	
Aindrias Ó Caoimh	1912–1994	1966–1974	—	ex officio 1966–1974
Richard McLoughlin	1902–1972	1969–1972	—	
Séamus Henchy	1917–2009	1972–1988	—	
Frank Griffin	1918–2016	1973–1991	—	
Thomas Finlay	1922–2017	1974–1994	1985–1994	ex officio 1974–1985
Tom O'Higgins	1916–2003	1974–1985	1974–1985	
John Kenny		1975–1982	—	
Weldon Parke	1912–1981	1976–1981	—	
Anthony J. Hederman	1921–2014	1981–1993	—	
Niall McCarthy	1925–1991	1982–1992	—	
Liam Hamilton	1928–2000	1985–2000	1994–2000	ex officio 1985–1994
Hugh O'Flaherty	1937–2026	1990–1999	—	
Séamus Egan	1923–2004	1991–1995	—	
John Blayney	1925–2018	1992–1997	—	
Susan Denham	1945–	1992–2017	2011–2017	First woman appointed, first woman Chief Justice
Harry Whelehan	1944–	1994	—	ex officio 1994
Declan Costello	1926–2011	1995–1998	—	ex officio 1995–1998
Donal Barrington	1929–2018	1996–2000	—	
Ronan Keane	1932–	1996–2004	2000–2004	
Francis Murphy		1996–2002	—	
Kevin Lynch	1927–2013	1996–1999	—	
Henry Barron	1928–2010	1997–2003	—	First Jewish member
Frederick Morris	1929–	1998–2001	—	ex officio 1998–2001
John L. Murray	1943–2023	1999–2015	2004–2011	
Catherine McGuinness	1934–	2000–2006	—	
Adrian Hardiman	1951–2016	2000–2016	—	
Hugh Geoghegan	1938–2024	2000–2010	—	
Nial Fennelly	1942–	2000–2014	—	
Joseph Finnegan	1942–2023	2001–2012	—	ex officio 2001–2006
Brian McCracken	1934–	2002–2006	—	
Nicholas Kearns	1946–	2004–2015	—	ex officio 2009–2015
Fidelma Macken	1942–	2005–2012	—	
Richard Johnson	1937–2019	2006–2009	—	ex officio 2006–2009
Liam McKechnie	1951–	2010–2021	—	
Frank Clarke	1951–	2012–2021	2017–2021	
John MacMenamin	1952–	2012–2022	—	
Mary Laffoy	1945–	2013–2017	—	
Sean Ryan	1948–	2014–2018	—	ex officio 2014–2018
Peter Kelly	1950–	2015–2020	—	ex officio 2015–2020
Mary Finlay Geoghegan	1949–	2017–2019	—	
Mary Irvine	1956–	2019–2022	—	ex officio 2020–2022
Marie Baker	1954–	2019–2024	—	
Elizabeth Dunne	1956–	2013–2026	—	
Peter Charleton	1956–	2014–2026	—	

== See also ==
- List of judges of the High Court of Ireland
- List of judges of the Court of Appeal of Ireland
