= Sinn Féin Funds case =

Irish court case

Buckley and Others v. Attorney General and Another
- Coat of arms of Ireland
- Court: Supreme Court of Ireland
- Full case name: Margaret Buckley, Séamus Mitchell, Séamus O'Neill, Padraig Power, Mairéad McElroy, Séamus Russell, Diarmuid Ó Laoghaire, Seán Poole, Joseph Fowler and Seán Ua Ceallaigh, on behalf of themselves and all other Members of the Sinn Féin Organisation established in the year 1905 and reconstituted in the year 1917 v. The Attorney General of Éire and Charles Stewart Power
- Decided: 31 July 1947
- Citation: [1950] 1 IR 67

Case history
- Prior action: Application by the Attorney General to the High Court in accordance with the Sinn Féin Funds Act 1947 to dismiss an action taken by the plaintiffs.
- Appealed from: High Court

Court membership
- Judges sitting: Murnaghan, Geoghegan, O'Byrne, Black and Martin Maguire JJ.

Case opinions
- The passing of legislation by the Oireachtas to stay an ongoing court case was an unconstitutional interference by the Oireachtas with the operation of the Courts in a purely judicial domain and the Sinn Féin Funds Act 1947 was also incompatible with personal property rights contained in Art. 43 of the Constitution.
- Decision by: Murnaghan J.
- Concurrence: Geoghegan, O'Byrne, Black and Martin Maguire JJ.

Keywords
- Constitution; Oireachtas; Personal property rights; Pending action; Interference; Justiciability; Separation of powers; Sinn Féin Funds Act 1947

The Sinn Féin Funds case (Buckley and Others v. Attorney General and Another) was a 1942–1948 Irish court case in which the Sinn Féin party claimed ownership of funds deposited with the High Court in 1924 which had belonged to the Sinn Féin party before 1923. The Sinn Féin Funds Act 1947, which attempted to halt the court case and assign the funds to Bord Cistí Sinn Féin, was ruled unconstitutional by the Supreme Court in an important judgement on separation of powers and private property rights. The original action was subsequently decided against Sinn Féin, on the basis that the pre-1923 party was separate from the 1940s party. Most of the disputed funds were consumed by legal costs.

== The funds ==
Sinn Féin was established in 1905 as an Irish nationalist political party. In 1917, it was reconstituted under leader Éamon de Valera with a more radical separatist agenda, incorporating members and ideas from the Irish Volunteers who had organised the 1916 Easter Rising. It set about raising funds for its campaign of civil disobedience, which by 1919 escalated into the Irish War of Independence when Sinn Féin proclaimed an Irish Republic independent of the United Kingdom of Great Britain and Ireland. Sinn Féin funds were for party-political purposes and were smaller than and separate from the Dáil loans, which the Republic treated as government bonds to fund its administration and its army, the IRA. The party's Central Fund was held in bank accounts controlled by its honorary treasurers, Eamonn Duggan and Jennie Wyse Power. The war ended with a truce in July 1921, followed by the Anglo-Irish Treaty in December, which provided for an Irish Free State. Sinn Féin split over the terms of the treaty, leading to the Irish Civil War of 1922–1923, won by the supporters of the Free State over those who sought to maintain the Irish Republic.

On either 9 December 1921 or 17 January 1922, the Sinn Féin standing committee resolved to make de Valera the party's sole trustee. At the February 1922 Ardfheis, the officer board became the standing committee. The party was in abeyance from the general election in June 1922, when it rubber-stamped the nomination of a combined slate of pro- and anti-treaty candidates in a failed attempt to stop the descent into civil war. In October 1922, after the Civil War had started, de Valera, who was anti-Treaty, wrote asking Duggan and Wyse Power, who were pro-Treaty, to transfer the funds to him in conformance to the old standing committee's resolution. They refused to comply unless the new officer board/standing committee ordered them to do so. The officer board/standing committee met on 26 October 1922; pro-Treaty members had an eight–five majority and the board voted not to allow further expenditure without its approval. It never met again.

After the 1923 ceasefire, supporters of the Free State Executive Council founded the Cumann na nGaedheal party and anti-Treaty activists reconstituted Sinn Féin. In February 1924 Duggan and Wyse Power, taking legal advice from Timothy Sullivan, lodged the balance of the Central Fund in a trust in the High Court (Note: Technically the court was the "High Court of Justice in Southern Ireland", created in 1921 and preserved as a transitional measure by the 1922 constitution until the Courts of Justice Act 1924 created a new High Court. The latter court was likewise preserved by the 1937 constitution throughout the period when the Sinn Féin Funds case was before it.) under the provisions of the Trustee Act 1893 (56 & 57 Vict. c. 53); the balance was £8,663 12s. 2d. (£8,663.61, equivalent to £367,750 in 2021), from which administrative costs were deducted.

== 1942–1946 proceedings ==
The Sinn Féin party lost support when Fianna Fáil was founded in 1926 by its most prominent members, including de Valera; it stopped contesting elections after September 1927. In 1938 it ceded symbolic control of the notionally still-extant Irish Republic to the IRA Army Council. The party periodically proclaimed its right to the funds deposited in the High Court but took no legal action and was small enough to be ignored by the authorities.

When Eamonn Duggan died in 1936, Jennie Wyse Power became sole trustee of the Sinn Féin funds. Wyse Power died in 1941, and her son, Charles Stewart Power, a judge, inherited the position of trustee. It would be impossible to reimburse the funds to the original donors. Power suggested to Éamon de Valera, then Taoiseach, that the money could be used to support needy veterans of the revolutionary period. While de Valera began planning enabling legislation to effect this, Power approached surviving members of the pre-Treaty standing committee of Sinn Féin for their consent, and all but one agreed. Power also consulted most of those involved in the 1923 re-establishment of Sinn Féin, who had joined Fianna Fáil in 1926, and whose contention that the 1923 party was not a continuation of the pre-Treaty party is described by historian Agnès Maillot as "rewriting history" to serve their own ends.

The leaders of the contemporary Sinn Féin became aware of the proposals, and on 19 January 1942, brought a High Court action by originating plenary summons against Power and the Attorney General seeking a declaration that the funds were the property of the party, and the payment of the funds to its honorary treasurers. By this time the funds amounted to £18,200 19s. 6d., invested in Irish Free State 4% Conversion Loan, 1950–70 (£13,041 1s. 5d.), Irish Free State Second National Loan (£4,927 14s. 8d.), and cash (£616 3s. 9d.).

The proceedings were formally called Margaret Buckley, Séamus Mitchell, Séamus O'Neill, Padraig Power, Mairéad McElroy, Séamus Russell, Diarmuid Ó Laoghaire, Seán Poole, Joseph H. Fowler and Seán Ua Ceallaigh, on behalf of themselves and all other Members of the Sinn Féin Organisation established in the year, 1905, and reconstituted in the year, 1917 Plaintiffs v. The Attorney General of Éire and Charles Stewart Power Defendants. The plaintiffs were respectively the president, vice-presidents, honorary treasurers, honorary secretaries, two members of the standing committee and one ordinary member of Sinn Féin.

There was no further action from the plaintiffs for several years and the respondents applied to have the case dismissed. On 21 November 1945 the High Court gave Sinn Féin a month to proceed and notice of trial was issued on 19 December 1945. In October 1946 the hearing was fixed for 26 November. On 11 November, the plaintiffs sought an order that their original solicitor, William Boyle Fawsitt, release to their new solicitor, Peadar Cowan, papers which he was holding in lien for unpaid fees; the High Court refused and the case was adjourned pending an appeal of this decision to the Supreme Court.

== Sinn Féin Funds Act 1947 ==
The Sinn Féin Funds Act 1947 was an act of the Oireachtas introduced in the 12th Dáil by the Taoiseach, Éamon de Valera, on 11 March 1947. His justification was that "unless there is action taken by the Legislature, these funds will be frittered away in legal costs". The Act provided for a seven-person board, Bord Cistí Sinn Féin, with a chairman nominated by the Chief Justice and the others by the Government. De Valera had first confirmed that the Chief Justice, Conor Maguire, was willing to make the nomination. The act directed the High Court to pay the Sinn Féin funds to the board; it could also accept donations from others. The board could invest its funds in the same manner as Post Office savings, and could make payments to needy veterans of Irish republican paramilitary groups in 1916–1921. It would be dissolved when its funds were exhausted. Section 10 of the act purported to stay the proceedings started in 1942, and to require the High Court to dismiss the action upon an ex parte application from the Attorney General. The act was signed into law on 27 May 1947.

On 10 June 1947, Aindrias Ó Caoimh, junior counsel for the Attorney General, made an ex parte application under Section 10 of the act to dismiss the case. George Gavan Duffy, the President of the High Court, was already convinced the act was unconstitutional, and told all the court's judges to refer the case to him if it was assigned to them. Mr Justice Kevin Dixon duly did so, recusing himself because in 1942, before being made a judge, he had assisted the then Attorney General in the case. Ó Caoimh was taken aback when Gavan Duffy rejected the application on the ground that Section 10 of the act violated the Constitution of Ireland, in two ways: it violated the separation of powers, in that the legislature was attempting to prevent the judiciary hearing a case as provided under Articles 34 to 37 of the Constitution; and it violated Article 43's protection of private property, by requisitioning the funds without sufficient cause. Ó Caoimh argued that s.5 of the Erasmus Smith Schools Act 1938 and s.1(1) of the Accidental Fires Act 1943 similarly restricted legal proceedings; Gavan Duffy responded that the 1938 act was made by mutual agreement between the litigants, and that he would regard the 1943 provision as likewise unconstitutional. Judgment was not reserved; instead Gavan Duffy immediately read out a ruling he had written the day before hearing. On 23 June, the Attorney General's appeal was heard in the Supreme Court, before judges James Murnaghan, James Geoghegan, John O'Byrne, William Black and Martin Maguire, with senior counsel John A. Costello and Seán MacBride appearing for Sinn Féin. Conor Maguire recused himself because of his prior involvement in the legislative process. The Supreme Court's judgment, delivered by O'Byrne on 31 July 1947, upheld both grounds of the High Court ruling. Although the constitution prohibits the publication of dissenting opinions, Gerard Hogan states that William Black may have disagreed with the verdict.

The courts' reasoning in the Sinn Féin Funds case has not been called into question as regards separation of powers; however, as regards private property, John M. Kelly and others have pointed out that it is difficult to reconcile with the 1957 ruling in Attorney General v Southern Industrial Trust.

== 1948 proceedings ==
After the Sinn Féin Funds Act had been found unconstitutional, the original 1942 case recommenced. It was adjourned after the February 1948 general election to allow Sinn Féin to appoint new counsel, because Costello and MacBride were now ministers in the new coalition government. It was heard in the High Court between 18 March 1948 and 19 November 1948. The testimony and supporting documentation of the case, which remain an important primary source for historians of the 1917–1926 period, are now divided among the National Archives of Ireland, National Library of Ireland, and Irish Military Archives. De Valera gave evidence on 20 April on Sinn Féin's structure while he was its leader. It was pointed out that he now contradicted what he had said in 1929: "Those who continued on in the organisation which we left can claim exactly the same continuity that we claimed up to 1925". The ruling, by T. C. Kingsmill Moore on 26 October 1948, was against Sinn Féin, on the basis that the organisation as reconstituted in 1923 was "not in any legal sense a continuation" of the party that had "melted away" in 1922, to which the funds had belonged. An ardfheis held on 16 October 1923 to revive Sinn Féin was, Kingsmill Moore said, "not properly constituted according to the Rules [existing prior to 1922] and its actions and resolutions can have no validity in preserving the continuity of the organisation".

Lawyers in Buckley v. Attorney General
Party	Solicitors	Barristers (Note: Attorney General's fees in guineas are given in parentheses.)		
Party	Solicitors	High Court (1948)	Supreme Court (1947)	Earlier hearings (1942–46)
Sinn Féin	Peadar Cowan	Charles Casey; Desmond Bell; Padraig O'Donoghue.	John A. Costello; Casey; Seán MacBride; O'Donoghue	J. M. Fitzgerald; M. J. Ryan; Roger O'Hanrahan.
Attorney General	Chief State Solicitor's Office	Richard McLoughlin (1066 gn.); Richard McGonigal (1039 gn.); Aindrias Ó Caoimh (695 gn.).	McLoughlin; McGonigal; Ó Caoimh; N. Barron; Thomas Conolly	Cearbhall Ó Dálaigh (63 gn.); Kevin Dixon (10 gn.); Conolly (4 gn.)
Charles Stewart Power	Corrigan & Corrigan	Michael Binchy; George Murnaghan; Thomas Bacon.	(not represented)	Art O'Connor; Edward J. Kelly; Cecil Lavery.

Kingsmill Moore awarded legal costs to the defendants in his 26 October judgment, and to the plaintiffs on 19 November after application, in both cases to be paid out of the Sinn Féin Funds themselves. In March 1947 the value of the funds had been £21,917 15s. 4d.; by October 1950 it was reduced to £1,704 8s. 1d., with TDs decrying the amount paid to lawyers. Although the costs of the 1947 Supreme Court case (£830 15s. 6d.) were paid from the government's Central Fund, those of the 1942–1948 High Court case, paid from the Sinn Féin Funds, amounted to £10,145 16s. for the plaintiff (Sinn Féin) and £13,707 5s. 1d. for the defendants. The Irish Times reported in 1959 that the account balance was still lying unclaimed in the High Court.

== Sources ==
Primary sources

- Court reports:
  - 1947 constitutionality judgment: "Buckley and Others v. the Attorney-General and Another" (RTF). Irish Reports. 1: 67–84. 1950 – via Supreme Court.
  - October 1948 ownership judgment: "Buckley and Others v Attorney General and Power (No. 2)". Irish Law Times Reports. 84: 9 et seq. 1950.
  - November 1948 costs ruling: McDermott, Laurence S. (1950). "Buckley and Others v. Attorney General and Power (No. 2)". Irish Jurist Reports. 16: 49–51. JSTOR 44506376.
- Statutes:
  - Accidental Fires Act 1943, s. 1 (No. 8 of 1943, s. 1). Enacted on 20 April 1943. Act of the Oireachtas. Retrieved from Irish Statute Book on 4 May 2021.
  - Erasmus Smith Schools Act 1938, s. 5: Ending litigation (No. 1P of 1938, s. 5). Enacted on 13 April 1938. Act of the Oireachtas. Retrieved from Irish Statute Book on 6 May 2021.
  - Sinn Fein Funds Act 1947 (No. 13 of 1947). Enacted on 27 May 1947. Act of the Oireachtas. Retrieved from Irish Statute Book on 11 October 2015.
- Oireachtas debates:
  - "Sinn Féin Funds Bill, 1947: Debates". Bills. Oireachtas.

Secondary sources

- Feeney, Brian (2002). Sinn Féin: A Hundred Turbulent Years. O'Brien Press. ISBN 9780862787707.
- Golding, G. M. (1982). George Gavan Duffy, 1882–1951: a Legal Biography. Blackrock, County Dublin: Irish Academic Press. ISBN 978-0-7165-0207-4 – via Internet Archive.
- Hogan, Gerard (1997). "The Sinn Fein Funds Judgment Fifty Years On" (PDF). Bar Review. 2 (9). Bar Council of Ireland: 375–381. ISSN 1393-3426. Archived from the original (PDF) on 26 November 2020.
- Laffan, Michael (2 December 1999). The Resurrection of Ireland: The Sinn Féin Party, 1916–1923. Cambridge University Press. ISBN 9781139426299.
- Maillot, Agnès (30 June 2015a). "L'État Libre, l'Eire et la subversion du Sinn Féin, 1926–1948". Études irlandaises (in French). 40 (1): 43–57. doi:10.4000/etudesirlandaises.4447. ISSN 0183-973X.
