= Dundon v Governor of Cloverhill Prison =

Irish Supreme Court case

- Coat of arms of Ireland
- Court: Supreme Court of Ireland
- Full case name: Dundon -v- The Governor of Cloverhill Prison
- Decided: 19 December 2019
- Citation: [2005] IESC 83; [2006] 1 IR 518

Case history
- Appealed from: High Court
- Appealed to: Irish Supreme Court

Court membership
- Judges sitting: Denham J.Geoghegan J.Fennelly J., Hardiman J, Murray C.J

Case opinions
- Decision by: Denham J.
- Concur/dissent: Fennelly J. Geoghegan J. Denham J.

Keywords
- European Union; Extradition; Warrants; Procedural Law; Appeal; Murder; Injunction

Dundon v Governor of Cloverhill Prison, [2005] IESC 83, [2006] 1 IR 518, was an Irish legal case in which the Supreme Court rejected an appeal against extradition to the United Kingdom by Irish citizen Kenneth Dundon. The case is important in Irish law as Kenneth Dundon was the first man to be extradited under the European Arrest Warrants Act 2003 in Ireland.

== Background ==
On the night of 8 October 2003, the appellant Kenneth Dundon went to the flat of Christopher Jacobs in Hoxton, North London. Dundon's wife Anne McCarthy was staying in the flat with Jacobs at this particular time. Dundon was armed with a knife and proceeded to stab Jacobs in the face and neck, causing him to choke to death on his own blood. McCarthy claims to have witnessed the murder and told police that it was her husband who harmed Jacobs. Dundon was later arrested in London, but denied the allegations made by his wife. He was released on bail, and pending further investigation by the police he moved home to Limerick, Ireland. On 29 January 2004, a European Arrest Warrant (EAW) was issued against Dundon by the Thames Magistrates Court in England. The warrant was 'endorsed for execution' by the High Court in Dublin on 2 February 2004. He was subsequently arrested in Limerick on 11 February 2004, facing the charge of murder.

On 11 February 2004, Dundon was brought before the High Court and remanded in 'custody pursuant to s. 13(5) of the Act of 2003, to 27 February 2004, being the date fixed for the purposes of s. 16'. On 27 February the application under s. 16 was opened and adjourned, and Dundon remained in custody throughout March 2004, and a resumed hearing date was fixed on 25 March 2004. The Supreme Court upheld the High Court order on 16 March 2005. In the High Court, O'Caoimh J gave a reserved judgement on 14 May 2004, deciding that Dundon was to be surrendered to Thames Magistrates Court.

On 5 May 2005, O'Sullivan J. of the High Court, argued that the Applicant was detained in accordance with the law.

== Holding of the Supreme Court ==
The appeal to the Supreme Court arose on 6 May 2005 when Dundon claimed he was in unlawful custody because time limits established under the European arrest warrant scheme were breached and he therefore should be released. This argument was based on two documents, the Council Framework Decision and the EAW Act of 2003. Dundon submitted that the High court 'erred in its interpretation' and 'failed to draw a reasonable interpretation' of these articles. He further submitted his grounds for appeal on the basis that the High Court was mistaken in its decision to surrender him due to the decision not being 'taken within the stipulated time limits' of the documents.The Applicant argued that he 'continued to be lawful in the absence of an express provision requiring his release.' The grounds for appeal were heard on 26 July 2005 by the Supreme Court, but further documents were required alongside submissions and judgement was reserved on 4 October 2005.

Concluding Judgments

This was delivered on 19 December 2005 by Denham J, who agreed that the appeal would fail and the original decision by the High Court must be upheld. The Council Framework Decision suggested that the decision 'on the request be made within 60 days, which time limit could be extended for a further 30 days'. The 2003 Act urges the matter to be dealt with in a specific time frame, and requires the High Court to inform the Central Authority and the issuing judicial authority that an order has not been made within the time limit. Denham J. argued that the court had a 'duty to ensure that there are fair procedures, which encompass all issues going to due process' which includes issues such as allocating time to 'obtain undertakings from the issuing judicial authority' or 'enabling time to appeal' which occurred in this case. Denham J. further highlighted that the rights of the applicant were 'preserved' but the expected time limits were 'exceeded'. The Judge argued that there was no conflict between the Council Framework Decision and the EWA Act of 2003. He further stipulated to the Court the time limit is of 60 days with a further 30 days for the making up of a 'surrender order', but he suggested that this is merely a 'strongly worded recommendation' in the 2003 Act. Furthermore, the due process remains subject to ensuring fairness and access to the courts which includes the right to appeal. Also, with no mandated time limit of prior to the 'final order' it was decided by the Court that the applicant was not being unlawfully detained. The Court acknowledged that the Applicant exercised all his rights of access to the courts in full including his right to contest the issue and appeal.

Concurrences

Geoghegan J commented that the case had highlighted " serious issues relating to the effectiveness and enforcement of the European arrest warrant" within the jurisdiction of Ireland and that he would:

Agree with counsel for the Appellant that where there is an ambiguity in legislation as to whether the Oireachtas intended in a given instance detention or freedom, there is a prima facie presumption in favour of an interpretation involving freedom. But just because some particular aspect is not expressly spelled out in an Act, it does not necessarily mean that there is an ambiguity as far as interpretation is concerned.

In view of the duty on the courts to interpret the Act in light of its whole context and subsections, Geoghegan J ultimately agreed with the High Court decision. Finally Fennelly J. concurring with the previous judges, stated that he did 'not believe that the Appellant can derive any right to be released at the end of the sixty-day period from either the Act of 2003 or from the Framework Decision.' Furthermore, he clarified that:

The European Arrest Warrant is itself a novel instrument. It was adopted in the wake of the devastatingly tragic events of 11th September 2001. The drafting is extraordinarily loose and vague, particularly in the manner in which offences are defined. The Court, on this appeal, has to consider an Act of the Oireachtas which implements a Framework Decision adopted pursuant to the provisions of Title VI of the Treaty on European Union (TEU). However, Ireland has not made the declaration which is necessary under Article 35 of the TEU before the Court of Justice can exercise the interpretative jurisdiction envisaged by that article.

Hence, Supreme Court decided this question without any guidance from the Court of Justice.

Conclusion

Denham J. concluded that the time limit issue did not arise in this case, and the appeal was dismissed by the entire Supreme Court composition.

== See also ==
- List of Irish Supreme Court Cases
- Supreme Court
- High Court
- European Arrest Warrant
- Treaty of the European Union
- Oireachtas
- Thames Magistrate Court
- List of Judges in the High Court of Ireland
- List of Judges in the Supreme Court of Ireland
- Procedural Law
