= Fyffes Plc v DCC Plc =

Irish Supreme Court case

- Coat of arms of Ireland
- Court: Supreme Court of Ireland
- Full case name: Fyffes Plc v DCC Plc, S&L Investments Ltd, James Flavin and Lotus Greene Ltd
- Decided: 27 January 2005
- Citation: [2005] 1 IR 59; [2005] IESC 3; [2005] 1 ILRM 357
- Transcript: https://www.bailii.org/ie/cases/IESC/2005/3.html

Case history
- Appealed from: High Court
- Appealed to: Supreme Court of Ireland

Court membership
- Judges sitting: Geoghegan J., Fennelly J., McCracken J.

Case opinions
- The court ruled that disclosure of privileged documents to a third party does not always destroy or waive the privilege over expert advice obtained in connection with litigation and pending criminal prosecution for insider dealing.
- Decision by: Fennelly J.

Fyffes Plc v DCC Plc [2005] IESC 3; [2005] 1 IR 59; is an Irish Supreme Court case where the Court considered the plaintiffs allegations that the defendants had impliedly waived their privilege over expert advice obtained in connection with litigation and pending criminal prosecution for insider dealing. The case has been construed as one that raises questions surrounding "corporate governance" in Ireland. It is considered important in Irish legal history because the court ruled that disclosure of privileged documents to a third party does not always destroy or waive the privilege itself.

== Background ==
Fyffes Plc is a fresh fruit produce company based in Dublin, Ireland. It was owned by the McCann family, who were involved in the business since 1902. DCC Plc is also an Irish company specialising international sales, marketing, and support services. James (Jim) Flavin founded DCC Plc in 1976, and became the chief executive and deputy chairman of the company. He was also a director at Fyffes Plc. S&L Investments Ltd and Lotus Green were both subsidies of DCC Plc.

A financial year in Fyffes Plc ran from 1 November until 31 October. They would announce their results every 6 months. The preliminary results for the full financial year, ended on 31 October 1999 and were reported on 14 December 1999.

It was understood that the profits 'before tax and exceptional items had been €82.9 Million, which was an increase over 1998 by 5.1%. Due to this boost in profits that the report stated Fyffes was confident for the year 2000, which would have been considered a year of "further growth."

However, in November, the company's figures were below budget and performance when compared to the previous year. On 25 January 2000, a document was spread amongst directors such as Jim Flavin at Fyffes Plc, including the "actual trading performance for the first two months of the 1999 financial year (November and December)." It forecast a disastrous year for the company and their trading performances, and the company had lost €2.5 million in the first quarter of that financial year. The prediction was that the company was now going to be €13.7 million worse off than the previous year.

Jim Flavin allegedly arranged for all of the DCC Plc shares in Fyffes (10.5%) to be sold on 3, 8 and 14 February when the share price was increasing from 3.29 to 3.90. This occurred five weeks before any profit warnings from Fyffe's. The Irish Stock Exchange and the London Stock Exchange launched investigations towards the end of 2001, and this was reported to the Director of Public Prosecutions (DPP).

The main argument Fyffe's made was that the share sales were illegal because Flavin was in possession of 'price sensitive information' by default of being a director. Subsequently, he was aware of the poor financial performance of the documents sent out. The appellant claimed damages against the respondent under Part V of the Companies Act 1990, for alleged "insider dealing". This was unlawful under both Section 111 and Section 109 of the Criminal Justice Act.

Fyffes took a case up against DCC Plc in the High Court and lost the action. Laffoy J argued that the defendants were "not in possession of price-sensitive information" and did not act unlawfully in February 2000 when DCC sold shares in the company worth €106 million, making a profit of €85 million.

== Holding of the Supreme Court ==
Fyffe's Plc challenged a High Court judgment on 27 January 2005. The lower court denied an application under Order 31 Rule 18 of the Superior Courts Rules to review sensitive information papers supplied to the respondents. 'The Respondents got expert opinions from a number of people, and it is common practice before this Court that the many reports and papers providing such advice would, in the regular course of events, be entitled to privilege. MacCracken J determined whether 'that privilege has been lost or waived' in this appeal. Insider trading was covered by Part V of the Companies Act 1990.

The Stock Exchange submitted the insider trading case to the DPP in November 2001, according to the media. They also said that DCC wrote to the stock exchange regarding this. The media also reported that DCC sought to tell the stock market that they had no price-sensitive information. The respondent argued they were allowed to engage the Stock Exchange and DPP when their inquiry began in 2001. To minimise commercial consequences if convicted of insider trading, they sought to persuade the DPP not to prosecute. The stock exchange's DPP report was also criticised for lacking information.

Hence, DCC did not commit a crime by disclosing material that had been left out and may have impacted the Stock Exchange's report to the DPP. The respondent argued that limited ownership of private or privileged materials does not imply any loss of privilege. Fyffe Plc responded that the respondent firms actively intended to influence the stock Exchange in 'criminal proceedings by furnishing these documents', which might affect the DPP's decision not to charge them. MacCracken J. disregarded the functus officio argument. Under Section 115, the stock exchange must transmit all documents to the DPP. He stated that "there still remained a function to be performed by the stock exchange."

"Fyffes main objection to this procedure appears to be that in effect they were giving the information and documents to the Stock Exchange on the basis that the information would be passed on to the Director of Public Prosecutions if the news was good, but not if the news was bad," MacCracken J stated. It was suggested that the Stock Exchange was reviewing the reports. "The confidentiality agreement" between DCC and the Stock Exchange in their correspondences does not apply to any papers or information the Stock Exchange is lawfully compelled to provide to the DPP, the judge argued. The stock exchange may inform the DPP of investigations and findings.

The judge did not find any substance in the argument that the respondent could have potentially benefited from disclosing confidential documents to the Stock Exchange and thus influenced their decision. Nevertheless, the court made it clear that to show the respondents influenced the decision, Fyffes would need to challenge the issue 'without the benefit of the documents'. Fyffes requested that the respondent's waiver of confidentiality be taken away.

MacCracken J did not consider the respondents to have acted improperly by providing the materials to the Stock Exchange instead of the DPP. However, he admitted that DCC had an advantage in revealing the materials. He contrasted this case to Goldberg v NG and Ors to show the key difference. NG initiated the civil, criminal, and regulatory investigations in Goldberg. Fyffes' view did not influence the Stock Exchange's decisions. In this case, the restricted disclosure of essential papers was not unjust, thus the Court did not discuss it. The general norm applies only if the disclosing party and the recipient of the materials are connected for malicious intentions.

Fennelly J found that the respondent's only aim was to prevent the criminal investigation from going ahead by influencing the stock exchange, who then can persuade the DPP. It is not part of the court’s function to comment on the general desirability of such behaviour. The respondents did have an advantage, but that does not automatically put Fyffes in an unfavourable position.

Finally the appeal in this case was dismissed by both MacCracken J and Fennelly J. They both agreed the respondents did not commit an act that would waive privilege.

== See also ==
- List of Irish Supreme Court Cases
- Supreme Court
- High Court
- Fyffes Plc
- DCC Plc
- Insider Trading
- Stock Exchange
- Companies Act 1990
- List of Judges in the High Court of Ireland
- List of Judges in the Supreme Court of Ireland
- Procedural law
