= MJELR v Rettinger =

Irish Supreme Court case

Minister for Justice, Equality & Law Reform v Rettinger
- Coat of arms of Ireland
- Court: Supreme Court of Ireland
- Full case name: MJELR -v- Rettinger
- Decided: 23 July 2010
- Citation: [2010] IESC 45; [2010] 3 IR 783

Case history
- Appealed from: High Court
- Appealed to: Supreme Court

Court membership
- Judges sitting: Denham J, McCarthy J, O'Flatherty J, Egan J, Hardiman J

Case opinions
- Case considered disallowing an extradition over human rights issues.
- Decision by: Denham J.

Keywords
- Personal Rights; Human Rights; Unlawful detention; Application for release; ECHR; European Arrest Warrant; Extradition

MJELR v Rettinger [2010] IESC 45, [2010] 3 IR 783, was a case in which the Irish Supreme Court ruled that to resist the application of a European Arrest Warrant on the basis that it would result in treatment contrary to Article 3 of the European Convention on Human Rights (ECHR), the wanted individual must offer substantial grounds to believe that he or she would be exposed to a real risk of such treatment.

== Background ==
On 23 September 2008 a Regional Judge at the District Court at Krakow issued a European Arrest Warrant for Robert Rettinger in Poland. on 10 June 2009 it was approved by the High Court of Ireland. He was arrested on 13 August 2009 and was taken into custody. It was argued that the Rettinger had committed the offence of burglary in Poland, and had served 203 days of pre-trial detention in Poland, but was now required to serve the balance of his two-year sentence.

From 13 August, the appellant was in custody in Ireland. The High Court judgement on this case was delivered on 7 May 2010 and on 20 May the High Court granted a 'certificate of leave to appeal' to the Supreme Court.

Under section 16(12) of the European Arrest Warrant Act 2003 the appellant must provide "evidence capable of establishing substantial grounds for believing that he would be exposed to a real risk of being subjected to treatment contrary to Article 3 were he to be surrendered", and that, "he will suffer treatment contrary to Article 3, or is it sufficient for him to show that, on the balance of probabilities, there is a real risk that he will suffer such treatment?"

The High Court Judge Peart J. stated in his judgement that Rettinger's evidence was insufficient and that:

[I]t is not known at this stage even which prison or other detention centre the respondent may be required to spend time if surrendered. Speculation as to what conditions he may have to experience in some prison somewhere in Poland, even if supported by the criticisms and shortcomings which have been identified in various reports and even cases before the European Court of Human Rights is insufficient to enable the respondent's objection to surrender to succeed.

== Holding of the Supreme Court ==
Mr. Robert Rettinger appealed the decision of the High Court in the Supreme Court on 23 July 2010. Mr. Rettinger's argument was that the Judge in the High Court 'erred in law' and failed to recognise the weight of the risk he would face if extradited back to Poland. In failing to do this, Mr. Rettinger would suffer a breach of his rights under Article 3 of the European Convention on Human Rights if extradited.

Section 37 of the European Arrest Warrant 2003 states that a person shall not be surrendered if:

(1) A person shall not be surrendered under this Act if—(a) his or her surrender would be incompatible with the State's obligations under

- (i) the Convention,
- (ii) the Protocols to the Convention
- or (iii) were the person to be surrendered to the issuing state— (II) he or she would be tortured or subjected to other inhuman or degrading treatment.

The third article of the ECHR sets out that 'No one shall be subjected to torture or to inhuman or degrading treatment or punishment'.

The Supreme Court set out 'the principles to be addressed by the courts in an executing Member State when considering an allegation that there would be inhuman or degrading treatment experienced by the respondent, if surrendered to the issuing state.' Fennelly J. stated that the Court was obliged to refuse an application a European Arrest Warrant if 'there are reasonable grounds for believing that' the person sought would be subjected to 'inhuman or degrading treatment'. The Judge argued that this would be the first time for the Court to consider 'the standard of proof which it and consequently the High Court must apply in European Arrest Warrant cases when a person facing surrender complains of the danger of being subjected, if surrendered, to inhuman or degrading treatment in the issuing Member State'. Fennelly J stated that the High Court judge did not question the appellants right to argue against his surrender when there was a true risk of his rights being breached under the ECHR, and furthermore the existing case law did not address the issue for the Court. Fennelly suggested that the 'entire application should be remitted to the High Court for reconsideration in the light of the appropriate standard of proof, as explained by this Court'.

Conclusion

Both Fennelly J and Denham J, after considering the case, allowed the appeal on the basis that the matter would be remitted to the High Court judge who was requested to apply an appropriate test for considering the risk to the appellant's rights if extradited.

== Subsequent developments ==
- Fred Muwema v Facebook Ireland Limited [2018] IECA 104 Mr. Justice Michael Peart referred to this case when the Judge was considering evidence that has to be 'adduced to support the assertion of the real risk of a breach of the constitutional right relied upon'.

== See also ==
- List of Irish Supreme Court Cases
- Supreme Court
- High Court
- European Arrest Warrant
- European Convention of Human Rights
- Extradition
- Oireachtas
- Poland
- Procedural law
- List of Judges in the High Court of Ireland
- List of Judges in the Supreme Court of Ireland
