= Frank Griffin =

Frank Griffin may also refer to:

- Frank Griffin (English footballer) (1928–2007), English football winger
- Frank Griffin (director) (1886–1953), American film director, writer and actor
- Frank Griffin (Australian footballer) (1886–1965), Australian rules footballer
- Frank Griffin (judge) (1919–2016), justice of the Supreme Court of Ireland
- Frank Hastings Griffin (1886–1974), American inventor
