= Siobhán Stack =

Irish barrister, High Court judge nominee

The Hon. Ms. Justice Siobhán Stack

Judge of the High Court
- Incumbent
- Assumed office March 2021
- Nominated by: Government of Ireland
- Appointed by: Michael D. Higgins

Personal details
- Born: Limerick, Ireland
- Education: University College Cork; University of Cambridge; King's Inns

Siobhán Stack is an Irish judge and lawyer who has served as a Judge of the High Court since March 2021. She was previously a barrister and academic.

== Early life ==
Stack is from County Limerick. She studied law at University College Cork, obtaining BCL and LLM degrees, and graduated from the University of Cambridge with an LL.M. degree. She subsequently studied at the King's Inns in order to become a barrister.

== Legal career ==
She first worked as a law lecturer at University College Dublin, before qualifying as a barrister in 1995. She commenced practice in 1996 and became a senior counsel in October 2013. Her practice encompassed judicial review, asylum law, European Union law and law relating to the European Convention on Human Rights. She has frequently appeared on behalf of the Irish government and has acted for defendants in the Special Criminal Court. She was counsel for Eamonn Harrison in his extradition hearing in connection with the Essex lorry deaths and counsel for the Minister for Justice in the Supreme Court of Ireland in constitutional proceedings taken by Ali Charaf Damache. She represented Ireland at a hearing of the European Court of Justice in relation to the European Arrest Warrant in 2016.

In 2019, High Court judge Richard Humphreys made critical comments of Stack and another barrister in his published opinion in a case they appeared in. In the case's appeal to the Supreme Court, Supreme Court Justice Marie Baker said the comments were "on any view offensive and humiliating" and that they "have no place in a judgement".

Outside of legal practice, she contributed to summaries of court decisions in The Irish Times and to a text on asylum law, in addition to acting as professional practice editor of the Irish Journal of European Law. She has guest lectured in asylum law at the King's Inns.

== Judicial career ==
Stack was nominated to become a judge of the High Court in March 2021, following the retirement of Bernard Barton. She made her declaration of office on 26 March 2021.

She has presided over cases involving personal injuries, injunctions, constitutional law, trustee law and judicial review.
