= Carmel Stewart =

Irish barrister, High Court judge since 2014

The Hon. Ms. Justice Carmel Stewart

Judge of the High Court
- Incumbent
- Assumed office 30 October 2014
- Nominated by: Government of Ireland
- Appointed by: Michael D. Higgins

Judge of the Circuit Court
- In office 12 April 2012 – 30 October 2014
- Nominated by: Government of Ireland
- Appointed by: Michael D. Higgins

Personal details
- Born: Carmel Stewart; 1957 (age 68–69) Tuam, County Galway, Ireland
- Spouse: Noel Grehan (m. 1995)
- Education: University College Galway; King's Inns

Carmel Stewart (born 1957) is an Irish judge and lawyer who has served as a Judge of the High Court since October 2014. She previously served as a Judge of the Circuit Court from 2012 and 2014.

== Early life ==
Stewart was born in Tuam, County Galway, in 1957. She attended the Presentation Convent in Tuam. She finished her Leaving Certificate in 1975 and began studying law at University College Dublin. She decided to leave UCD and worked until she began studying in University College Galway in 1980. She graduated with BA and LLB degrees. She undertook studies to become a barrister at the King's Inns.

== Legal career ==
She was called to the Bar in 1987 and became a senior counsel in 2008. She devilled with Catherine McGuinness in her first year as a barrister. She specialised in constitutional and public law, including family law, adoption and wards of court.

She appeared in several cases involving abortion in the Republic of Ireland. She acted for the Irish Family Planning Association in an action against Youth Defence. She represented the applicants in A, B and C v Ireland in the European Court of Human Rights in 2009.

She acted as Vice Chairperson of the Employment Appeals Tribunal and was a member of the Mountjoy Prison Visiting Committee between 1996 and 1999. She was a board member of the National College of Art and Design

She was a board member and director of the Free Legal Advice Centres and a chairperson of the Family Lawyers Association. She was a member of the Labour Party and a member of the party executive.

== Judicial career ==
=== Circuit Court ===
Stewart became a Judge of the Circuit Court in April 2012. She was assigned to the Dublin circuit. She presided over cases involving criminal law and family law.

=== High Court ===
In October 2014, she was elevated to the High Court. She frequently hears trials at the Central Criminal Court involving serious criminal offences, including rape and murder. She also hears cases involving vulnerable people, deportation, injunctions, and the Criminal Assets Bureau.

She has presided over cases involving ISIL and the Hutch–Kinahan feud. In October 2018, she discharged a jury after a ten-day trial after barrister Paul Anthony McDermott had explained the defence of provocation in the context of an unrelated trial on an edition of RTÉ's Prime Time.

She was appointed a part-time commissioner of the Law Reform Commission in September 2015. She was appointed for a five-year term to replace Marie Baker.

== Personal life ==
She is married to Noel Grehan.
