= Judge Biggs =

Judge Biggs may refer to:

- Asa Biggs (1811–1878), judge of the United States District Court for the Albemarle, Cape Fear and Pamptico Districts of North Carolina
- Caroline Biggs (fl. 1990s–2020s), judge of the High Court of Ireland
- John Biggs Jr. (1895–1979), judge of the United States Court of Appeals for the Third Circuit
- Loretta Copeland Biggs (born 1954), judge of the United States District Court for the Middle District of North Carolina
