= Ryan v Governor of Midlands Prison =

Irish Supreme Court case

- Coat of arms of Ireland
- Court: Supreme Court of Ireland
- Citations: [2014] IESC 54, [2014]

Court membership
- Judges sitting: Finlay CJ, McCarthy J, O'Flatherty J, Egan J, Hederman J

Ryan v Governor of Midlands Prison [2014] IESC 54 was a case in which the Irish supreme court ruled that, ordinarily, a Court order detaining a convicted individual that is not prima facie invalid should only be challenged through an appeal of the conviction or an application for judicial review rather than through an application for release under the constitutional principle of habeas corpus.

== Background ==
In July 2010 the Circuit Criminal Court sentenced Ryan to two concurrent sentences of six years imprisonment for the illegal possession of firearms in accordance with s 27 (a) of the Firearms Act 1964. Ryan applied to the Minister for Justice for one third remission under rule 59(2) of the prison rules 2007 where it states ‘ the minister may grant greater remission of sentence in excess of one quarter, but not exceeding one third thereof where a prisoner has shown further good conduct by engaging in structured activity and the minister is satisfied that, as a result the prisoner is less likely to re-offend and will be better able to integrate into the community.’ This would put his release date under the rule as May 2014 rather than November 2014. The Minister for Justice refused Ryan’s application under article 40 of the Constitution. Article 40.4.2 of the constitution states that regarding "Complaints being made by or on behalf of any person to the High Court or any judge thereof alleging that such person is being unlawfully detained, the High Court and any and every judge thereof to whom such complaint is made shall forthwith inquire into the said complaint". Ryan then made a habeas corpus application to the High Court challenging the legality of his continued detention. The Governor of Midlands prison produced a valid order for detention for Ryan. Ryan then proceeded to argue that the Minister’s decision was procedurally flawed. In the High Court Barrett J held that Ryan had established that his detention was not in accordance with the criteria of Article 40 of the Constitution and ordered for Ryan to be released immediately. The Governor of the prison appealed to the Supreme Court on the grounds that the Minister’s decision could not be challenged under Article 40 of the constitution but rather only done by judicial review.

== Holding of the Supreme Court ==
When the case was appealed to the Supreme Court Denham J took the view which was similar to the previously expressed case of FX v clinical director of the central mental hospital [2014] IESC 1 where in paragraph 65 of the judgement it states, "In such circumstances where an order of the court does not show any invalidity on its face, the route of the constitution and immediate remedy of hebeas corpus is not the appropriate approach."

Another case which was used by Denham J to show the position of the court would be that of Roche v Governor of Clover Hill Prison [2014] IESC where Charlton J pointed out that "there are legal structures in place to deal with such commonplace situations and these fall outside the obligation of the High Court to enquire into and to declare that a detained person is either lawfully detained or not." The court would express that the proposition that not every defect or illegality attached to detention will invalidate that detention has long been established.
