= Rory O'Hanlon (Irish judge) =

Irish High Court judge (1923–2002)

Judge of the High Court
- In office March 1981 – 23 May 1995
- Nominated by: Government of Ireland
- Appointed by: Patrick Hillery

Personal details
- Born: Roderick Joseph O'Hanlon; 11 April 1923 Phibsborough, Dublin, Ireland
- Died: 24 March 2002 (aged 78) Blackrock, Dublin, Ireland
- Spouses: Mary Ingoldsby (m. 1954; died 1968); Barbara Keating (m. 1980)
- Education: University College Dublin; King's Inns

Roderick Joseph O'Hanlon (11 April 1923 – 24 March 2002) was an Irish judge and barrister who served as a Judge of the High Court from 1981 to 1995. He was also President of the Law Reform Commission.

He was dismissed by the Irish Government from presidency of the Law Reform Commission in 1992, after commenting that if Ireland's membership of the European Union forced the introduction of abortion to Ireland, the country should withdraw from the bloc. He later sued the Government and won substantial damages.

Post-retirement, O'Hanlon took an active part in campaigning to oppose the divorce referendum of 1995, calling divorce "a grave offence against natural law". During the lead-up to the referendum on the Maastricht Treaty, it was revealed in an interview that he was a member of the secretive Catholic organisation, Opus Dei.

He died in March 2002 after a battle with stomach cancer.

== See also ==
- List of judges of the High Court (Ireland)
