= Paul Anthony McDermott =

English-born Irish lawyer and academic (1972–2019)

Paul Anthony McDermott SC
- Born: 4 February 1972; London, United Kingdom
- Died: 10 December 2019 (aged 47); Dublin, Ireland
- Education: University College Dublin; University of Cambridge; King's Inns
- Occupations: Barrister; Academic; Senior Counsel
- Spouse: Annick
- Children: 2

Paul Anthony McDermott, SC (4 February 1972 – 10 December 2019) was an English-born Irish lawyer and academic. He was a prominent criminal barrister who often prosecuted cases in the Irish superior courts. He was also known as a lecturer in law at University College Dublin and for frequent commentary on legal matters in the Irish media.

== Early life and education ==
McDermott was born in London and studied in St Paul's College, Raheny when his family returned to Ireland. He studied law at University College Dublin, at Gonville and Caius College, Cambridge and at the King's Inns. He held a PhD from UCD. He won the Irish Times Debate for the King's Inns in 1996.

== Career ==
He was called to the bar in 1996 and became a Senior Counsel in 2015.

McDermott was a prominent criminal lawyer. He appeared with Úna Ní Raifeartaigh and Paul O'Higgins in actions taken on behalf of the Director of Public Prosecutions against Seán FitzPatrick arising out of the collapse of Anglo Irish Bank. He successfully represented the State in the High Court in the first Irish case to consider the admissibility of CCTV evidence.

He frequently represented the Data Protection Commissioner, including in the European Court of Justice in 2017 in a case which found that professional exam papers and examiner comments constitute personal data. He often appeared on behalf of the Law Society of Ireland and the Medical Council of Ireland in prosecuting professional malpractice cases. He also worked with the Central Bank of Ireland in inquiries, including into Quinn Insurance and the misselling of tracker mortgage products by Irish banks.

He taught criminal law at University College Dublin and the law of evidence at the Law Society of Ireland. He co-authored a text on Irish criminal law with Peter Charleton and Marguerite Bolger and co-authored a book on the law of contract in Ireland with his brother James McDermott. He wrote a regular column for The Sunday Times for over 10 years.

McDermott frequently appeared on Irish television and radio as a commentator on legal matters. He often appeared on Morning Ireland, Today with Seán O'Rourke, RTÉ News: Six One, and Newstalk on legal topics such as criminal and constitutional law. He received attention for his analysis and comments on the referendum to establish the Court of Appeal and the referendum to repeal the Eighth Amendment. In 2017, a murder trial at the Central Criminal Court was collapsed by the judge after the jury heard comments McDermott made describing the defence of provocation in an unrelated discussion on Prime Time.

== Personal life and death ==
McDermott was married to Annick and had two sons. He died on 10 December 2019 after an illness. The Minister for Justice and Equality Charles Flanagan said he paid tribute to him as a "talented barrister, popular lecturer & entertaining newspaper columnist". Micheál P. O’Higgins, the Chairman of the Bar Council of Ireland, said he was "unparalleled" in his "ability to explain complex legal subjects and distil them for better public understanding". The Irish Times concluded that he was "destined" to join the judiciary. His funeral took place in Newman University Church on 14 December 2019 and was attended by the President Michael D. Higgins, the Chief Justice Frank Clarke and the Attorney General Séamus Woulfe.
