= Michael Tuomey =

Michael Tuomey may refer to:

- Michael Tuomey (geologist)
- Michael Tuomey (politician)

== See also ==
- Michael Twomey (disambiguation)
