= Gilligan v Ireland =

Irish Supreme Court case

John Gilligan v Ireland & Others
- Coat of arms of Ireland
- Court: Supreme Court of Ireland
- Full case name: John Gilligan (Appellant) v Ireland, The Attorney General, The Minister for Justice, Equality and Defence and the Governor of Portlaoise Prison (Respondents)
- Decided: 14 October 2013
- Citation: [2013] IESC 45; [2013] 2 IR 745; [2014] ILRM 153
- Transcript: https://www.bailii.org/ie/cases/IESC/2013/S45.html

Case history
- Appealed from: High Court
- Appealed to: Supreme Court

Court membership
- Judges sitting: Denham C.J, Murray J, Fennelly J, Clarke J, MacMenamin J

Case opinions
- Section 13 of the Criminal Law Act 1976 allows judges to apply the principle of proportionality in sentencing. This section provides that only in certain circumstances will an offender on conviction receive a consecutive sentence.
- Decision by: MacMenamin J
- Concurrence: Denham C.J, Murray J, Fennelly J, Clarke J

Keywords
- Sentencing, Constitution of Ireland, Personal Rights, Mandatory regime, Criminal Law Act 1976, Consecutive Sentence, Equal treatment, Serious offences

Gilligan v Ireland [2013] IESC 45; [2013] 2 IR 745; [2014] ILRM 153 is an Irish Supreme Court case where the constitutionality of section 13 of the Criminal Law Act 1976 was challenged. This statutory provision related to the sentencing of those who commit a further crime while in prison. The section primarily says that any sentence of imprisonment imposed should be consecutive to the sentence being served. It was argued that John Gilligan was subject to discrimination because of this mandatory scheme. Significantly, this case also put forward the concept of proportionality and the sentencing power given to the judiciary.

Ultimately, the Supreme Court dismissed the appeal, as they did not find the provision to be unconstitutional or discriminatory in any manner. The Supreme Court in this instance agreed with the High Court decision and found that the section challenged was a relevant part of the 1976 Act. It said that the section intended to advance a rational and legitimate goal. In addition, there should be no question as to the role prescribed by the Constitution relating to the administration of justice. Therefore, on these grounds the Supreme Court did not find in favour of Mr Gilligan.

== Background ==
The plaintiff (John Gilligan) was serving a 20 year sentence for drug related offences and was found in possession of a mobile phone while in prison on two different occasions. As a result he was required to serve two separate 6 and 8 month sentences consecutively after the term of his first offence. The case originated in the High Court where the Court considered the sentencing power of the judiciary and a challenge made by Mr Gilligan as to the constitutionality of section 13 of the Criminal Law Act 1976. This provision states that the sentences were to be served consecutively on the basis of which Gilligan was given his sentence in the High Court. The question raised was whether section 13 was outside the remit of the separation of powers doctrine.

Mr Gilligan essentially argued that he was being denied equality of treatment. The counsel on his behalf made reference to Articles 40.1, 40.3.1 and 40.3.2 of the Irish Constitution to support his claim that he was subject to discrimination. Section 13 (2) of the 1976 Act created an exception in cases of life sentences and Mr Gilligan argued that because he was not allowed to avail of this exception, he was being denied equality of treatment. He also questioned the validity of article 2 of the 1976 Act on the basis that the regime is unfair even to those who are given life sentences. In addition he argued that certain sections of the 1976 Act impacted on him more severely than those prisoners who had committed worse crimes. Nevertheless, Roderick Murphy J in the High Court dismissed all his claims and found no fault in the subsections.

The case proceeded on appeal to the Supreme Court and a majority decision was delivered on the 14th of October 2013 by MacMenamin J. The accompanying Supreme Court justices were Murray J, Fennelly J, Clarke J and Chief Justice Susan Denham.

== The Rationale of the Supreme Court ==
The Supreme Court considered other cases relating to the separation of powers doctrine and the idea of proportionality. It can be described as follows: ''the sentence imposed in any individual case must be proportionate to the gravity of the personal circumstances of the offender.'' A reference was made to the case of Buckley v Attorney General. O'Byrne J in that case made a specific reference to Article 6 of the Constitution which relates to the separation of powers. This same principle was applied in the later case of Crotty v An Taoiseach where Finlay C.J observed that: ''[The separation of powers] involves for each of the three constitutional organs not only rights but duties also; not only areas of activity and function, but boundaries to them as well.''

The judgement of the Supreme Court was delivered by MacMenamin J dismissing the appeal which had been brought forward from the High Court. Two separate issues rose before the Court on appeal: Firstly, the sentencing power of the judiciary was questioned because at times the sentencing decision is ''a subjective decision on the part of the judge'' alongside the constitutionality of section 13 of the Criminal Law Act 1976 as said already. It was argued that this impugned provision offended the separation of powers principle because it stipulated that if persons who are already serving a sentence in prison for other offences commit another crime, then these sentences are to run consecutively. The consecutive nature of sentencing mentioned in the statute takes away the discretion given to the judiciary in sentencing matters. Gilligan argued that the three organs of the State, the legislative, the executive and the judiciary are vital and should have separate functions. Gilligan said the requirement in section 13 was an ''encroachment on the sentencing powers of the judiciary.'' It overlooks the right to be sentenced by a trial court in due course of law as well as taking away a judge's power to determine an appropriate sentence given the facts of a case. However, the Court found it difficult to agree with him on this matter. Where the constitutionality of provisions enacted after the adoption of the Constitution of 1937 is questioned a double construction rule is applied. Meaning where there are two interpretations of the provision in question, one saying the provision is constitutional and one saying it is unconstitutional, courts must prefer the first one rather than the latter. The Court said Gilligan cannot simply make a case on a hypothesis that he would receive an unfair sentence on appeal. Identifying the respective role of the judiciary in relation to sentencing can be analsyed based on previous case law. The case of Deaton v Attorney General has been widely cited. It helps in identifying the boundary lines between the executive and judicial organs of government and it is authority for the proposition that identifying an appropriate punishment is a function of the administration of justice. Ultimately, the Supreme Court did not find a breach of the separation of powers doctrine in this case. MacMenamin J said that a custodial sentence ''if'' imposed on someone who has committed a crime while already serving in prison for another offence, then the sentence will be consecutive. He said the executive has no role in sentencing whether that is selecting from a range of sanctions or deciding its term. Neither does the executive have a role in the trial process. Hence, the separation of powers doctrine is well guarded. In addition, the Court found that the principle of proportionality was correctly applied and that Gilligan had actually benefited from its application in previous sentencing. He was originally given a 28 year sentence in the Special Criminal Court, but on appeal the sentence was reduced as it was declared disproportionate. Likewise, a consecutive sentence imposed on him for assaulting a prison guard on the basis of Article 13(1) of the 1976 Act was also reduced on appeal.

Furthermore, the Court did not find the provision arbitrary in any manner. In terms of the discrimination, Gilligan argued that he was being discriminated against as the section excludes those serving life sentences. The fact that a prisoner serving life sentence for a more serious crime than his for example murder is not subject to consecutive sentencing is unfair. He also claimed that his sentences are longer than many life sentences. The Court said people sentenced to life are in a different section from those sentenced for a specific time period. This is simply because a life sentence is for life and so while a person can still be tried for committing crimes while serving for life sentence, there are some frailties attached to such sentences. There is a logical reasoning as to why persons sentenced for life fall into an objectively different category than those sentenced for a certain term. This differentiation does not give way for discrimination in any manner. Essentially, the Supreme Court rejected Gilligan's discrimination argument stating that its main reason for existence was that of deterrence. So, it was not unfair. If the sentencing is concurrent rather than consecutive, it would defeat the purposes of giving an additional sentence to a prisoner who has carried out a further crime.

The Court therefore for the reasons discussed above dismissed both grounds of appeal which Mr Gilligan had put forward.

== Conclusion ==
This is an important case as it shows the Supreme Court looking back at previous case law on issues involving impugned sections of legislation and discrimination contrary to equality before the law laid out in the Constitution. Gilligan was due to be released from Portlaoise prison in February 2013 where he had been serving a 20 year sentence for drug trafficking. However, once he received two additional sentences for possession of a mobile device he lodged appeals against the District Court decisions. The judgement in Gilligan v Ireland & Others demonstrates that the Court carried out the correct constitutional function of sentencing and applied the principle of proportionality rightly. Additionally it was found that the impugned provision was neither arbitrary nor discriminatory in its effect as its intention was that of advancing a legitimate goal.

== Subsequent Developments ==
The Law Reform Commission has commented on constitutional and sentencing proportionality as follows:

''The doctrine of constitutional proportionality requires that the mandatory sentencing provision should be rationally connected to the objective it seeks to achieve and it should not be arbitrary. Secondly, the provision should impair the rights of the accused as little as possible and thirdly, there should be proportionality between the mandatory provision and the right to trial in due course of law.''

One case which made reference to Gilligan v Ireland was Scott Purdue v The Director of Public Prosecutions. Reference was made to the judgment of MacMenamin J in Gilligan relating to the principle of proportionality and how each sentence must be proportionate to the nature of the offence. With regard to this extract by MacMenamin J. the Court in Purdue found that the portion of the sentence given by the District Judge to Mr Purdue could not stand. Another case which made reference to the judgment in Gilligan was the case of Wayne Ellis v Minister for Justice and Equality & Others. It considered the separation of powers between the Oireachtas and the judiciary. It also dealt with s.13 of the Criminal Law Act 1976. Reference was made to how the challenge in Gilligan was rejected.
