= Sanfey =

Sanfey is a surname. Notable people with the surname include:

- James Sanfey (1922–2000), Irish politician
- Mark Sanfey (fl. 1987), Irish judge
