= Siobhán Phelan =

Irish barrister, High Court judge

The Hon. Ms. Justice Siobhán Phelan

Judge of the High Court
- Incumbent
- Assumed office 6 December 2021
- Nominated by: Government of Ireland
- Appointed by: Michael D. Higgins

Personal details
- Education: Trinity College Dublin; McGill University; King's Inns

Siobhán Phelan is an Irish judge and lawyer who has served as a Judge of the High Court since December 2021. She formerly practised as a barrister and was the chair of the Free Legal Advice Centres.

== Early life ==
Phelan studied law at Trinity College Dublin. She studied at the Paris 2 Panthéon-Assas University as part of the Erasmus Programme. She completed an LLM degree at the Institute of Comparative Law at McGill University’s Faculty of Law in 1994. Her thesis on the topic of legal aid was supervised by Roderick A. Macdonald.

== Legal career ==
She was called to the Bar in 1995 and became a senior counsel in 2015. Her practice encompassed judicial review, immigration law, competition law, constitutional law, the law of tort, environmental law, Garda compensation and equality law.

She has acted as the Director of Public Prosecutions. She represented the Green Party in unsuccessful action against RTÉ during the 2016 Irish general election and Green Party TD Patrick Costello's constitutional challenge regarding the Comprehensive Economic and Trade Agreement in 2021. The Health Service Executive appointed her and Conor Dignam to represent the unborn child in PP v. HSE in 2014. She acted for Angela Kerins in her action against the Public Accounts Committee. She advised the Olympic Council of Ireland during the 2016 Summer Olympics ticket scandal. She was one of two writers of an amicus curiae submission to the High Court on behalf of the Irish Human Rights Commission for Marie Fleming's challenge to laws prohibiting assisted suicide.

She was a director of the Free Legal Advice Centres from 1992 and was elected to replace Iseult O'Malley as its chair in 1997. She was a winner of the People of the Year Awards in 2004 for her contribution to FLAC.

== Judicial career ==
The Irish government agreed to nominate her to become a judge of the High Court in November 2021. She was appointed on 6 December 2021.
