= Francis Murphy (judge) =

Irish judge

Judge of the Supreme Court
- In office 15 April 1996 – 19 October 2002
- Nominated by: Government of Ireland
- Appointed by: Mary Robinson

Judge of the High Court
- In office 12 February 1982 – 15 April 1996
- Nominated by: Government of Ireland
- Appointed by: Patrick Hillery

Francis Dominick Murphy is a former Irish judge and barrister who served as a Judge of the Supreme Court from 1996 to 2002 and a Judge of the High Court from 1982 and 1996. He was also the chair of the group which produced the Ferns Report in 2005.

== Early life ==
Murphy became a senior counsel in 1969. In addition to practice, he taught as a professor at the King's Inns. He served a term as chairman of the Bar Council of Ireland. He became a bencher of the King's Inns in 1975.

== Judicial career ==
=== High Court ===
He became a judge of the High Court in 1982. He was in charge of insolvency matters in the High Court during the 1990s and oversaw the insolvency process related to The Irish Press. Murphy served on an advisory committee to the Law Reform Commission.

=== Supreme Court ===
Murphy was appointed to the Supreme Court of Ireland in April 1996. He acted at various points as presiding judge in the Court of Criminal Appeal.

In 2000, he conducted an inquiry into Donnchadh O'Buachalla, a judge of the District Court, over allegations of bias in overseeing the grant of a licence to operate the Jack White's Inn pub to Catherine Nevin, who was a friend of O'Buachalla's. He found there while there were errors of judgement, there was no abuse of the legal process.

In the Supreme Court's decision in Maguire v. Ardagh, arising out of an Oireachtas inquiry into the death of John Carthy, he was one of two judges to dissent. The majority found that the Oireachtas could not inquire into a Garda operation. Murphy and the Chief Justice Ronan Keane held that the Oireachtas did have such power.

He retired in October 2002. His position was filled by Brian McCracken.

== Post-judicial career ==
Murphy was appointed to chair the Irish Financial Services Appeals Tribunal in 2007. He chaired the Residential Institutions Review Committee until November 2019.

=== Ferns Report ===
In 2002, he was appointed to chair a three-person non-statutory commission to review historic allegations of sexual abuse in the Roman Catholic Diocese of Ferns. The need for the inquiry was prompted by a preliminary report by George Birmingham. The Ferns Report was published in 2005 and was strongly critical of the handling of allegations by the Catholic Church.

=== Revenue Powers Group ===
Charlie McCreevy appointed him to chair a Revenue Powers Group in 2003 to make recommendations on the powers of the Revenue Commissioners, particularly in relation to its investigative powers related to tax evasion. Its report was published in February 2004. It recommended that the Revenue Commissioners be given additional powers.
