= Richard Humphreys (judge) =

Irish barrister and politician, High Court judge since 2015

The Hon. Mr. Justice Richard Humphreys
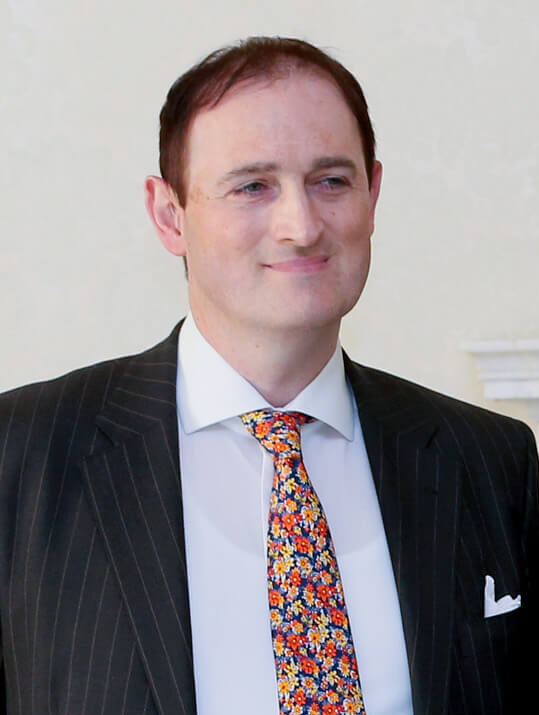
- Humphreys in 2015

Judge of the High Court
- Incumbent
- Assumed office 1 October 2015
- Nominated by: Government of Ireland
- Appointed by: Michael D. Higgins

Personal details
- Party: Labour Party
- Other political affiliations: Fine Gael
- Education: University College Dublin; Trinity College Dublin; King's Inns

Richard Humphreys is an Irish judge and lawyer who has served as a Judge of the High Court since October 2015. He was previously a barrister, legal academic, political adviser, and was a member of Dún Laoghaire–Rathdown County Council for the Labour Party.

== Early life ==
Humphreys attended St Michael's College, Dublin, graduating in 1984. He received BCL and LLM law degrees from University College Dublin in 1988 and 1989 respectively. While a student at UCD, Humphreys was the auditor of the L&H society between 1986 and 1987. During his term in charge of the society, it hosted the World Universities Debating Championship.

He subsequently attended the King's Inns and obtained a PhD in law from Trinity College Dublin.

== Legal career ==
He was called to the Bar in 1991 and became a senior counsel in 2009. He practised primarily in the area of public law, specifically Constitutional law, judicial review and immigration law. He twice appeared for Sinn Féin in constitutional challenges. He also appeared in media law and defamation cases.

Humphreys was a lecturer at UCD and University College Cork between 1990 and 1993, and also taught at the law faculties of TCD and NUI Galway. He was a member of the Balance in Criminal Law Review Group and the chairperson of the Statute Law Expert Advisory Group.

While a government adviser, he attended talks in 1996 which contributed to the Good Friday Agreement. He has since written two texts on the agreement, United Ireland and the border between Northern Ireland and the Republic of Ireland.

== Political career ==
As a teenager, Humphreys was a member of Young Fine Gael, before becoming a member of the Labour Party.

He worked as a legal adviser to the Labour Party for two decades. He became a legal adviser to Mervyn Taylor at the Department of Equality and Law Reform in January 1993, holding that position until 1997.

He was elected to Dún Laoghaire–Rathdown County Council at the 2009 local elections as a county councillor for the Stillorgan local electoral area. He was re-elected in 2014, serving until his retirement from politics in May 2015. In 2010, he proposed a motion to offer to hold an event to welcome Queen Elizabeth II.

== Judicial career ==
Humphreys was appointed to the High Court in October 2015, by the Fine Gael and Labour Party coalition government.

In an immigration case ruling in 2016, he followed a 2008 ruling of Judge Mary Irvine that the unborn had constitutional rights that should be considered by the Minister for Justice, and took the view that this conclusion was reinforced by Article 42A of the Constitution of Ireland. The Supreme Court of Ireland in 2018 reversed this reasoning but upheld the order that the Minister was obliged to consider the rights that would accrue on birth of the child. He has also heard numerous judicial review cases, including decisions of the Department of Justice and Equality and the Department of Education and Skills. In 2018, he ordered the State Examinations Commission to expedite its decision on an appeal to the awarding of Leaving Certificate points.

Humphreys was appointed to the Law Reform Commission as a part-time commissioner for a five-year term in October 2020. The same month, the Supreme Court gave judgment on an appeal against two 2019 judgments by Humphreys in an immigration case; while upholding his "lucid, reasoned, elegant and intelligent" judgment, Justice Marie Baker criticised "quite remarkable and personally insulting comments" he had made about counsel for both sides.

He is the judge in charge of the Strategic Infrastructural Development Judicial Review List of the High Court.
