= Emily Egan =

Irish Court of Appeal judge, barrister

The Hon. Ms. Justice Emily Egan

Judge of the Court of Appeal
- Incumbent
- Assumed office 29 June 2026
- Nominated by: Government of Ireland
- Appointed by: Catherine Connolly

Judge of the High Court
- In office 5 October 2021 – 28 June 2026
- Nominated by: Government of Ireland
- Appointed by: Michael D. Higgins

Personal details
- Education: Trinity College Dublin; University of Oxford; King's Inns

Emily Egan is an Irish judge and lawyer who has served as a Judge of the High Court since October 2021 and who was appointed to the Court of Appeal on 29 June 2026. She previously practiced as a barrister in which she specialised in medical law, public law, and regulatory law.

== Early life ==
Egan studied law at Trinity College Dublin from where she graduated with an LL.B. degree in 1991. She later obtained a BCL degree from the University of Oxford.

== Legal career ==
Prior to commencing legal practice, Egan was a research assistant at the Law Reform Commission. She was called to the Irish bar in 1994 and became a senior counsel in 2010. Her practice involved medical law, public law and regulatory law.

She acted for regulators in High Court cases including the Information Commissioner, Environmental Protection Agency, An Bord Pleanála, and the Independent Radio and Television Commission. In 2021, she acted for An Bord Pleanála in a case taken against it by An Taisce to prevent the development of a cheese factory by Glanbia.

She has represented hospitals at inquests and other proceedings arising out of medical cases including the Children's Health Ireland at Crumlin, the Health Service Executive, the Rotunda Hospital and Cork University Hospital. She acted for Quest Diagnostics in multiple cases arising out of the CervicalCheck cancer scandal. She has been a legal assessor to the Medical Council of Ireland, the Pharmaceutical Society of Ireland, the Nursing and Midwifery Board of Ireland and the Teaching Council.

The Attorney General of Ireland appointed Egan (with senior counsel Frank Clarke) to represent the public interest at the Moriarty Tribunal in 1998.

She was the chairperson of a group of barristers working pro bono with the Bar Council of Ireland and the Ana Liffey Drug Project which drafted a bill to legislate for supervised injection sites. Features of the draft bill became part of the Misuse of Drugs (Supervised Injecting Facilities) Act 2017. In 2017, she presented an overview of certain constitutional aspects of abortion in the Republic of Ireland at the Citizens' Assembly.

== Judicial career ==
Egan was one of five people nominated to the High Court in September 2021. She was appointed on 5 October 2021.
