= Kerida Naidoo =

Irish barrister, High Court judge

The Hon. Mr. Justice Kerida Naidoo

Judge of the High Court
- Incumbent
- Assumed office 21 February 2022
- Nominated by: Government of Ireland
- Appointed by: Michael D. Higgins

Personal details
- Education: Trinity College Dublin; King's Inns

Kerida Naidoo is an Irish judge and lawyer who has served as a Judge of the High Court since February 2022. He was formerly a barrister.

== Early life ==
Naidoo obtained a BA from Trinity College Dublin and attended the King's Inns. He was the auditor of the College Historical Society between 1990 and 1991. He appeared on the RTÉ TV series Challenging Times representing the King's Inns in 1994.

== Legal career ==
He was called to the Irish Bar in 1995 and became a senior counsel in 2015. He was heavily involved in criminal trials, appearing for the prosecution and for defendants.

He was counsel for the Director of Public Prosecutions in cases involving murder, health and safety offences, sexual offences, weapons offences, kidnap, robbery, and drugs offences. Naidoo was the prosecuting barrister in the trial of a man convicted of vandalising Argenteuil Basin with a Single Sailboat (a painting by Monet). He appeared for the DPP in the first prosecution of the offence of coercive control in Ireland. He acted for the Office of the Director of Corporate Enforcement in High Court proceedings connected with its investigation into the Football Association of Ireland.

He defended county councillor Kieran Mahon in his trial for the false imprisonment of Joan Burton, where the jury returned a not guilty verdict.

He was a member of a working group on judicial review from 2001 for the Law Reform Commission.

== Judicial career ==
Naidoo was nominated to become a judge of the High Court in January 2022. He was appointed in February 2022.
