= Michael Twomey =

Michael Twomey may refer to:

- Michael Twomey (actor) (1933–2017), Irish actor
- Michael Twomey (judge), Irish High Court judge
- Michael Twomey (politician), Irish politician who was a member of Seanad Éireann in 1938
- Michael W. Twomey, American medievalist
- Mick Twomey, Australian rules footballer
