= Caroline Biggs =

Irish barrister, High Court judge

The Hon. Ms. Justice Caroline Biggs

Judge of the High Court
- Incumbent
- Assumed office 5 October 2021
- Nominated by: Government of Ireland
- Appointed by: Michael D. Higgins

Personal details
- Education: University College Dublin; King's Inns

Caroline Biggs is an Irish judge and lawyer who has served as a Judge of the High Court since October 2021. She previously practised as a barrister where she specialised in criminal law.

== Early life ==
Biggs attended University College Dublin from where she graduated with a BCL degree in 1995.

== Legal career ==
She was called to the Irish bar in 1997 and became a senior counsel in 2009. She specialised in criminal law, appearing both for defendants and on behalf of the Director of Public Prosecutions. She acted in cases involving drug offences, assault, sexual offences, tax offences and homicide.

In 2018, she was appointed to chair a group of representatives from government departments and bodies to respond to recommendations on addressing child abuse.

== Judicial career ==
Biggs was nominated to the High Court in September 2021. She was one of five new judges created to deal with the increase in legal cases as the COVID pandemic eased. Other appointees were Marguerite Bolger, Emily Egan, Cian Ferriter and David Holland. She was appointed on 5 October 2021.
