= Melanie Greally =

Irish judge

The Hon. Ms. Justice Melanie Greally

Judge of the High Court
- Incumbent
- Assumed office 29 November 2022
- Nominated by: Government of Ireland
- Appointed by: Michael D. Higgins

Judge of the Circuit Court
- In office 27 November 2014 – 29 November 2022
- Nominated by: Government of Ireland
- Appointed by: Michael D. Higgins

Personal details
- Education: University College Dublin; King's Inns

Melanie Greally is an Irish judge and lawyer who has served as a Judge of the High Court since November 2022. She previously served as a Judge of the Circuit Court from 2014 and 2022.

== Early life ==
Greally attended University College Dublin, from where she obtained a BCL degree in 1989.

== Legal career ==
After attending the King's Inns, she was called to the Bar in 1991. She appeared in criminal trials acting as prosecution barrister and defence counsel. She acted in High Court cases for the Minister for Justice in cases involving arrest warrants.

== Judicial career ==
=== Circuit Court ===
Greally became a judge of the Circuit Court in November 2014 and was assigned to the Dublin circuit in July 2015.

She has heard cases involving assault, money laundering, theft, dangerous driving, sexual offences and fraud. She was the presiding judge in the unsuccessful prosecution of Paul Murphy and others for the charge of false imprisonment of Joan Burton.

=== High Court ===
She was nominated and appointed to the High Court in November 2022.
