= Mícheál O'Higgins =

Irish barrister, High Court judge

The Hon. Mr. Justice Mícheál O'Higgins

Judge of the High Court
- Incumbent
- Assumed office 4 April 2023
- Nominated by: Government of Ireland
- Appointed by: Michael D. Higgins

Personal details
- Education: University College Dublin; King's Inns

Mícheál P. O'Higgins is an Irish judge and lawyer who has served as a Judge of the High Court since April 2023. He was formerly a barrister and chair of the Council of the Bar of Ireland.

== Early life ==
O'Higgins obtained a BCL degree from University College Dublin in 1988.

== Legal career ==
He was called to the Bar of Ireland in 1990 and became a senior counsel in 2008. His practice focused on public law and criminal law cases.

He acted for the Garda Commissioner at the Disclosures Tribunal and for Michael Fingleton in action taken by the liquidators of Irish Nationwide Building Society.

He was elected chair of the Council of the Bar of Ireland in July 2018 and served a two-year term.

== Judicial career ==
He was nominated for appointment to the High Court in January 2023 and appointed in April 2023.

== Personal life ==
He is married to Paula and has four children.
