= PP v. HSE =

Irish High Court case

- Court: High Court of Ireland
- Full case name: P.P v. Health Service Executive
- Decided: 26 December 2014
- Transcript: transcript

Court membership
- Judges sitting: Kearns P., Baker J., Costello J.

Keywords
- Abortion

P.P v. Health Service Executive was a 2014 case in the Irish High Court to rule on whether a pregnant woman (anonymised as "N.P.") who was brain dead ought to be kept on life support until the foetus was viable and could be delivered. The woman's next of kin wished her life support to be switched off but medical staff were unsure whether this would violate the foetus' right to life, which was guaranteed by the Eighth Amendment of the Constitution of Ireland. The case was brought against the Health Service Executive (HSE) by N.P.'s father "P.P."

== Timeline ==
On 27 November 2014, a woman, twelve to fourteen weeks pregnant, was admitted to hospital with headaches and nausea. Two days later, she suffered a fall and was later found to be unresponsive. On 3 December, she was declared clinically brain dead. The cause was a large cerebellar cystic lesion causing acute hydrocephalus and compression of the brain stem. She was placed on life support against her family's wishes. Her parents and partner supported turning off the life support machines. Her two young children did not recognise her when they visited her, and were upset at her appearance.

On 15 December 2014, her father applied to the High Court for life support to be turned off. Nicholas Kearns, the President of the High Court, fast-tracked P.P.'s application for his daughter to be made his ward, which took effect on 23 December. On 22 December Kearns decided that the case was important enough for three judges to hear it: himself, Marie Baker, and Caroline Costello.

The case was heard on 24 December. Four senior counsel were heard: Mary O'Toole for the plaintiff, Gerry Durcan for the respondent, Cormac Corrigan representing the interests of the woman, and Conor Dignam representing the interests of the unborn child. Seven doctors gave evidence.

On 26 December 2014, the court ruled that the life support machine could be turned off. None of the counsel appealed the verdict.

The woman was taken off life support on 27 December, and buried on 29 December 2014. In September 2015, an inquest jury returned an open verdict into the cause of her death.

In November 2016, the family commenced legal action against the HSE, claiming medical negligence.

== Ruling ==
In ruling for life support to be switched off, the court held that the woman's right to dignity and her family's wishes could take precedence because the chances of the foetus being born alive were infinitesimal. The court rejected an argument that the Eighth Amendment applied only to Irish abortion law and thus ought not to be invoked in a non-abortion case. The ruling also stated "when the mother who dies is bearing an unborn child at the time of her death, the rights of that child, who is living, and whose interests are not necessarily inimical to those just expressed, must prevail over the feelings of grief and respect for a mother who is no longer living." This left open the possibility of an opposite verdict in a hypothetical similar case further into a pregnancy.

Women's Link Worldwide gave the High Court judgment the "Bronze Gavel" for promoting gender equality at its 2015 "Gender Justice Uncovered" awards.

== See also ==
- Eighth Amendment of the Constitution of Ireland
- Abortion in the Republic of Ireland
- A, B and C v Ireland
- Death of Savita Halappanavar
- Ms Y
- Protection of Life During Pregnancy Act 2013
