= Bronagh O'Hanlon =

Irish barrister and High Court judge

Bronagh O’Hanlon

Judge of the High Court
- In office 8 January 2014 – 12 November 2021
- Nominated by: Government of Ireland
- Appointed by: Michael D. Higgins

Personal details
- Born: 13 November 1951 (age 74) Tralee, County Kerry, Ireland
- Spouse: Seamus Cannon
- Education: Trinity College Dublin; King's Inns

Bronagh O'Hanlon (born 1951) is a retired Irish judge who served as a judge of the High Court from 2014 to 2021.

== Early life ==
O'Hanlon studied at Trinity College Dublin and the King's Inns. She was called to the Bar in 1989 and became a senior counsel in 2005. Her practice primarily consisted of civil litigation and family law matters. She is a former chairperson of the Family Lawyers Association of Ireland. She was a panel member under the Garda Síochána Disciplinary Regulations.

== Judicial career ==
She was appointed to the High Court in January 2014. Her case load included many cases involving personal injuries, medical negligence, and family law matters. She has also heard cases seeking injunctive relief and bail cases.

She approved the first service of documents in Ireland via LinkedIn in a liquidation case in 2014.

O'Hanlon retired as a judge on 13 November 2021. In January 2022 the Minister for Defence, Simon Coveney, appointed her to chair an independent review into issues of sexual misconduct, bullying and harassment in the Defence Forces.

== Personal life ==
O'Hanlon is married to Seamus Cannon. She can speak fluent Irish and French.

She is also a relative of Dr Rory O'Hanlon, Caoimhghín Ó Caoláin and the Paddy O'Hanlon.
