= Frank Griffin (Australian footballer) =

Australian rules footballer

Personal information
- Full name: Patrick Francis Griffin
- Born: 16 June 1886; Pyalong, Victoria
- Died: 24 February 1965 (aged 78); Wangaratta, Victoria
- Original team: Caulfield / Pyalong

Playing career^{1}
Years	Club	Games (Goals)
1909–10	St Kilda	2 (0)
- ^{1} Playing statistics correct to the end of 1910.

Patrick Francis Griffin (16 June 1886 – 24 February 1965) was an Australian rules footballer who played with St Kilda in the Victorian Football League (VFL).
