= Conor Dignam =

Irish barrister, High Court judge

The Hon. Mr. Justice Conor Dignam

Judge of the High Court
- Incumbent
- Assumed office 6 December 2021
- Nominated by: Government of Ireland
- Appointed by: Michael D. Higgins

Personal details
- Education: Trinity College Dublin; King's Inns

Conor Dignam is an Irish judge and lawyer who has served as a Judge of the High Court since December 2021. He was formerly a barrister.

== Early life ==
Dignam studied political science at Trinity College Dublin, graduating in 1992. He subsequently obtained a diploma in legal studies and trained to be a barrister at the King's Inns.

== Legal career ==
He was called to the Bar in 1996 and became a senior counsel in 2011. He practiced in the area of public law, with specialisations in child and health law.

The Health Service Executive appointed Dignam and Siobhán Phelan to represent interests of an unborn child in PP v. HSE in 2014. He acted for the Garda Síochána, Nóirín O'Sullivan and Martin Callinan at the Disclosures Tribunal.

He chaired an inquiry into the Leas Cross scandal in 2010 and was commissioned to write an investigative report arising out of the 'Grace' case.

Outside of practice, he was appointed a board member of Community Law & Mediation in 2020 and was the vice chair of the Bar Council of Ireland. He served as chair of the Bar Council's human rights committee and was a Bar Council representative on the Superior Courts Rules Committee.

== Judicial career ==
Dignam was one of three people nominated by the government in November 2021 to be appointed judges of the High Court. He was appointed on 6 December 2021.
