= Rory Mulcahy =

Irish barrister, High Court judge

The Hon. Mr. Justice Rory Mulcahy

Judge of the High Court
- Incumbent
- Assumed office 4 April 2023
- Nominated by: Government of Ireland
- Appointed by: Michael D. Higgins

Personal details
- Education: Trinity College Dublin; Queen's University Belfast; University College Dublin; King's Inns

Rory Mulcahy is an Irish judge and lawyer who has served as a Judge of the High Court since April 2023. He was formerly a barrister.

== Early life ==
Mulcahy obtained a law degree from Trinity College Dublin in 1994. He subsequently obtained a master's degree in human rights law from Queen's University Belfast and a diploma in arbitration from University College Dublin and attended the King's Inns.

== Legal career ==
He was called to the Bar in 1998 and became a senior counsel in 2014. His practice encompassed regulatory law, company law, planning law and construction law. He frequently acted for the Medical Council of Ireland in fitness to practise inquiries.

His board memberships have included the Irish MS Society. He was a panel member of the Dispute Resolution Authority from 2005.

== Judicial career ==
He was appointed to the High Court in April 2023.

== Personal life ==
Mulcahy is married with three children.
