= Niall McCarthy (judge) =

Irish judge (1925–1992)

Judge of the Supreme Court
- In office 1 November 1982 – 1 October 1992
- Nominated by: Government of Ireland
- Appointed by: Patrick Hillery

Personal details
- Born: 25 May 1925 Cork, Ireland
- Died: 2 October 1992 (aged 67) Seville, Spain
- Cause of death: Car accident
- Spouse: Barbara McCarthy (m. 1941)
- Children: 4
- Education: University College Dublin; King's Inns

Niall McCarthy (25 May 1925 – 2 October 1992) was an Irish judge who served as a Judge of the Supreme Court from 1982 to 1992.

== Early life and career ==
McCarthy was born in Cork in 1925. He was the son of a district court judge. He was educated at Clongowes Wood College, the Christian Brothers in Dún Laoghaire, and later at University College Dublin. He was called to the Bar in 1945 and the inner Bar in 1959. He was chairman of the Bar Council of Ireland from 1980 until his appointment to the Supreme Court in 1982. A renowned barrister of his day, his work included representing Charles Haughey in the Arms Trial and to act for Gulf Oil in the Whiddy Island Disaster (1979) and for the owners of the Stardust fire venue (1981): he was the country's advocate of choice for two decades.

== Judicial career ==
On the Supreme Court, to which he was appointed on 1 November 1982, McCarthy seen as a consistently liberal voice. Though a firm respecter of the separation of powers, he was entirely without deference to the executive and sometimes took government and legislature severely to task. He berated the Government for its "inexcusable" failure to introduce appropriate laws with regard to abortion. He was affectionately known by his colleagues as "God".

He sat in 238 reported cases and a much larger number of unreported cases. Judicial writing is often dry, but the advocate's panache occasionally surfaced: in McGarry v. Sligo County Council [1991] 1 Irish Reports 99, the case which prevented the Carrowmore megalithic tombs complex from being turned into a pithead, he quoted a Yeats verse and heartily endorsed a Swedish archaeologist's rhetorical question, 'Do the Irish have no pride?’

In Norris v. Attorney General [1984] I. R. 36, heard only a few months after McCarthy's appointment, his dissenting judgment is a tour de force of classic liberalism. He noted that under the law as it then stood, the male homosexual suffered legal sanctions not visited upon 'the venal, the dishonest, the corrupt and the like'. He expounded a notably broad theory of the legal standing necessary to raise particular constitutional issues and firmly rejected the view, analogous to American 'originalism', that the mores prevailing when the constitution was adopted in 1937 are determinative of a contemporary constitutional challenge. He plangently asserted the right to privacy, at the end of perhaps the most important and influential dissenting judgment for fifty years.

In Trimbole v. Governor of Mountjoy Prison [1985] I. R. 550, McCarthy firmly rejected the view that a state (in that case, a garda) illegality might lead to judicial rebuke but should not interfere with the result of the case. The authorities, he said, 'must not be permitted to think' along those lines. On the contrary, such conduct: will result in the immediate enforcement, without qualification, of the constitutional rights of the individual concerned whatever the consequences may be. If the consequences are such as to enable a fugitive to escape justice then such consequences are not of the court's creation; they spring from the police illegality.

In the X Case [1992], a case on abortion, he eschewed the narrow ground that found favour with some others and baldly declared 'to go to another State to do something lawfully done there cannot ... admit of a restraining order'. He pointed to the obvious need for legislation to reconcile the separate rights acknowledged in the eighth (abortion) amendment to the constitution: 'The failure of the Legislature to enact the appropriate legislation is no longer just unfortunate; it is inexcusable'. The amendment itself was, McCarthy said, 'historically divisive of our people'.

On 21 August 1992, just weeks before his sudden death, McCarthy delivered a coruscating dissent in Attorney General v Hamilton [1993] 2 I. R. 250, the case that upheld the Reynolds government's claim to absolute confidentiality for cabinet discussions. This was in the context of the Hamilton tribunal enquiries into the issue of export credit insurance: McCarthy appended to his judgment the civil service note of what Reynolds had said the government had decided on that topic. Though McCarthy was in the minority (with Mr Justice Séamus Egan), the absolute confidentiality found to attach was removed by the twelfth amendment to the constitution of 1997.

On 1 October 1992, Niall McCarthy and his wife were killed in a motor accident near Seville in Spain whilst he was a sitting judge.
