= Raymond Fullam =

Irish judge

Judge of the High Court
- In office 30 October 2014 – 11 March 2017
- Nominated by: Government of Ireland
- Appointed by: Michael D. Higgins

Judge of the Circuit Court
- In office 8 October 2007 – 30 October 2014
- Nominated by: Government of Ireland
- Appointed by: Mary McAleese

Personal details
- Born: 1947 (age 78–79) Tralee, County Kerry, Ireland
- Education: University College Dublin; King's Inns

Raymond Fullam (born 1947) is a retired Irish judge who served as a Judge of the High Court from 2014 to 2017 and a Judge of the Circuit Court from 2007 to 2014.

== Early life ==
Fullam was born in 1947 and is from Tralee. He studied at University College Dublin, obtaining degrees in arts and commerce.

He was called to the Bar in 1977 and became a senior counsel in 1995. He practiced on the eastern and Dublin circuits. He was prosecutor for County Kildare between 1983 and 1991. Fullam also qualified as a chartered accountant.

He appeared in cases involving tax law, personal injuries and judicial review.

In addition to his practice, he was a lecturer at the King's Inns in revenue law was a member of the GAA Drugs Appeal Board.

== Judicial career ==
=== Circuit Court ===
Fullam was appointed to the Circuit Court in October 2007. He was not assigned to a particular circuit. He heard some cases in Tralee, Donegal and Wicklow.

He presided over criminal cases involving sexual assault, forgery, dangerous driving, health and safety law offences, drugs offences, assault and fraud.

=== High Court ===
He was elevated to the High Court in October 2014. His appointment arose out of vacancies created by the establishment of the Court of Appeal.

He was the judge in cases involving child law, personal injuries, the proceeds of crime, bankruptcy and judicial review. Fullam heard aspects of the legal case taken by Rory McIlroy against Horizon Sports Management, his former management team.

He retired from the bench in March 2017.
