= Brian Walsh (judge) =

Irish judge (1918–1998)

Judge of the European Court of Human Rights
- In office 11 December 1980 – 9 March 1998
- Nominated by: Government of Ireland
- Appointed by: Council of Europe

Judge of the Supreme Court
- In office 2 May 1961 – 14 April 1990
- Nominated by: Government of Ireland
- Appointed by: Éamon de Valera

Judge of the High Court
- In office 11 March 1959 – 1 May 1961
- Nominated by: Government of Ireland
- Appointed by: Seán T. O'Kelly

Personal details
- Born: 23 March 1918 Dublin, Ireland
- Died: 9 March 1998 (aged 79) Dublin, Ireland
- Spouse: Noreen Joyce (m. 1944)
- Children: 5
- Education: University College Dublin; King's Inns

Brian Walsh (23 March 1918 – 9 March 1998) was an Irish judge who served as a Judge of the Supreme Court from 1961 to 1990, a Judge of the European Court of Human Rights from 1980 to 1998 and a Judge of the High Court from 1959 to 1961.

Walsh was described as "one of Ireland's greatest judges" and the "outstanding legal reforming mind of his generation" by Prof. J. J. Lee. Walsh was seen as a reforming judge who sat on such key cases as Byrne v. Ireland (1972) - unconstitutionality of state immunity in tort; McGee v. The Attorney General (1974) - right to marital privacy and contraceptives; Crotty v An Taoiseach (1987) - ratification of EU treaties.

He was one of the dissenting minority in the case at the European Court of Human Rights that ruled in 1981 that the United Kingdom had breached the Convention in the matter of Northern Ireland's law criminalising homosexual acts.

Outside the bench, Walsh was the president of the Law Reform Commission from 1975 to 1985 and led the Irish delegation to the Anglo-Irish Law Enforcement Commission.

He attended Belvedere College and University College Dublin where he studied legal and political science before completing an MA in economics.
