= Michael Twomey (judge) =

Irish judge

The Hon. Mr. Justice Michael Twomey

Judge of the High Court
- Incumbent
- Assumed office 26 January 2016
- Nominated by: Government of Ireland
- Appointed by: Michael D. Higgins

Personal details
- Education: University College Cork; University College Dublin; Law Society of Ireland

Michael Twomey is an Irish judge and lawyer who has served as a Judge of the High Court since January 2016. He was previously a solicitor with an expertise in partnership law.

== Education ==
Twomey went to school in County Waterford. He was educated at University College Cork where he obtained a BCL degree in 1987 and obtained an LL.M. degree in 1988. His master's degree was in family law.

He obtained a PhD from University College Dublin in 2001 with a thesis on "The law relating to partnership in Ireland".

== Legal career ==
He qualified as a solicitor in 1990 in a commercial law firm in Dublin. After qualification, he worked for the European Commission to advise on intellectual property law. He then returned to Dublin to study and lecture.

He set up his own practice advising principally on partnership law. The firm was based in Ballsbridge, and among his clients were accountancy and law firms and an Irish rock band. He also advised on chancery law and commercial law.

He is an accredited mediator. He is a Bencher of the King's Inns since 2016.

He was written two editions of a book on partnership. He has been a visiting researcher at Harvard Law School. He has lectured in Trinity College Dublin and the Law Society of Ireland.

== Judicial career ==
Twomey was appointed to the High Court in January 2016. He is a member of the Commercial Court. He has heard cases involving insolvency law, judicial review, company law, medical law, family law, and personal injuries. He is critical of high awards of damages in compensation cases.

He has been the presiding judge in disputes between the solicitor Gerald Kean and EBS d.a.c., Garrett Kelleher and the National Asset Management Agency, the Quinn family and Irish Bank Resolution Corporation, and an action arising out of schemes by Bernie Madoff.

In 2017, he temporarily sat as a Judge of the Court of Appeal. He was the judicial assessor for ruling on nominations for the 2018 Irish presidential election.
