= William John Johnston =

Irish barrister and judge (1868–1940)

Judge of the Supreme Court
- In office 7 March 1939 – 17 January 1940
- Nominated by: Government of Ireland
- Appointed by: Douglas Hyde

Judge of the High Court
- In office 5 June 1924 – 7 March 1939
- Nominated by: Government of Ireland
- Appointed by: Tim Healy

Personal details
- Born: 18 January 1868 Magherafelt, County Londonderry, Ireland
- Died: 29 November 1940 (aged 72) Dublin, Ireland
- Spouse: Kathleen King (m. 1894)
- Children: Denis
- Education: Queen's University Belfast; King's Inns; Gray's Inn

William John Johnston (18 January 1868 – 29 November 1940) was an Irish barrister and judge who served as a judge of the Supreme Court from 1939 to 1940 and a Judge of the High Court from 1924 to 1939.

Born on 18 January 1868 near Magherafelt in County Londonderry, he was the eldest son of the seven children of James Johnston and his wife, Sarah (née Davidson). He was educated at Methodist College Belfast, and Queen's College, Belfast. He also studied at King's Inns and Gray's Inn.

He stood as a Liberal Home Rule candidate for South Londonderry at the December 1910 general election but was defeated by the Liberal Unionist MP John Gordon. He became a member of the Pembroke Urban Council in 1911. He was the editor of The New Irish Jurist from 1899 to 1905 and of The Irish Law Times from 1906 to 1911.

He was appointed county court judge of Monaghan and Fermanagh in 1911 and Monaghan and Louth in 1921. He was a High Court judge from 1924 to 1939, and from 1939 to 1940 served as a judge of the Supreme Court. He later became the Commissioner of Charitable Donations and Bequests.

1894 he married Kathleen King; they had one child, Denis Johnston, born in 1901. William John Johnston died in Dublin on 29 November 1940, aged 72.

== Works ==
- The Law of Local Government in Ireland
- The Labourers Acts; Land Purchase and the Act of 1903
- contributions in The Law Quarterly Review and other reviews

== Sources ==
- "Johnston, His Honour Judge" . Thom's Irish Who's Who . Dublin: Alexander Thom and Son Ltd. 1923 – via Wikisource.
