= Weldon Parke =

Irish judge (1912–1981)

Judge of the Supreme Court
- In office 4 July 1976 – 7 June 1981
- Nominated by: Government of Ireland
- Appointed by: Cearbhall Ó Dálaigh

Judge of the High Court
- In office 24 June 1974 – 3 July 1976
- Nominated by: Government of Ireland
- Appointed by: Erskine H. Childers

Personal details
- Born: 19 April 1912 Dublin, Ireland
- Died: 7 June 1981 (aged 69) Killiney, Dublin, Ireland
- Education: University College Dublin; King's Inns

Weldon Roycroft Cecil Parke (19 April 1912 – 7 June 1981) was an Irish judge who served as a Judge of the Supreme Court from 1976 to 1981 and a Judge of the High Court from 1974 to 1976.
