= Mark Sanfey =

Irish barrister, High Court judge since 2019

The Hon. Mr. Justice Mark Sanfey

Judge of the High Court
- Incumbent
- Assumed office 2 December 2019
- Nominated by: Government of Ireland
- Appointed by: Michael D. Higgins

Personal details
- Education: Trinity College Dublin; King's Inns

Mark Sanfey, born 1960/1961, is an Irish judge and lawyer who has served as a Judge of the Court of Appeal of Ireland since May 2026. He was appointed to the Court of Appeal after 7 years service as a High Court Judge. He previously practiced as a barrister specialising in insolvency and bankruptcy law.

== Early life ==
Sanfey was educated at Trinity College Dublin and trained to be a barrister at the King's Inns.

== Legal career ==
He became a barrister in 1987 and became a senior counsel in 2004. Sanfey specialised in aspects of insolvency law while in practice, including cases involving examinership, bankruptcy, receivership, and liquidation. He represented the former chair of Anglo Irish Bank Seán FitzPatrick in bankruptcy proceedings in 2010.

His practice also extended to other commercial litigation, including contractual disputes. He appeared for Michelle Rocca in 2015 in the High Court relating to a land dispute with her neighbour.

He acted for businessman Richard Lynn at the Mahon Tribunal.

Outside of practice, he was a founding member of the Construction Bar Association of Ireland, for which he was chairman between 2013 and 2018. In 1991, he co-authored "Bankruptcy Law and Practice in Ireland", with a second edition published in 2010.

== Judicial career ==
Sanfey was appointed to the High Court of Ireland in December 2019. He has heard cases involving bankruptcy, insolvency law, injunctions, judicial review, and professional misconduct. He replaced Denis McDonald as the High Court's designated judge hearing personal insolvency matters. As of 2021, he is the judge appointed to oversee arbitration cases in the High Court.
