= Bernard Barton (judge) =

Irish barrister (1951–2026)

Judge of the High Court
- In office 3 April 2014 – 10 March 2021
- Nominated by: Government of Ireland
- Appointed by: Michael D. Higgins

Personal details
- Born: Bernard Joseph Barton; 1951 Limerick, Ireland
- Died: 6 August 2026 (aged 74–75)
- Spouse: Anne Marie Barton
- Children: 4
- Education: University College Dublin; King's Inns

Bernard Joseph Barton (1951 – 6 August 2026) was an Irish judge who served as a Judge of the High Court from 2014 to 2021.

== Early life and education ==
Barton was born in Limerick, Ireland in 1951. He was educated in Glenstal Abbey School, University College Dublin, the Irish Management Institute and the King's Inns.

== Legal career ==
Barton became a barrister in 1977 and a senior counsel in 1997. His practice as a barrister was focused on tort, contract and personal injury litigation. He also lectured in the King's Inns.

== Judicial career ==
Barton was appointed to the High Court in April 2014. Barton heard a variety of criminal and civil matters in the High Court. He heard cases including proceedings involving extradition, examinership, judicial review, employment law, and personal injuries.

In 2020, Barton became the judge in Charge of the Jury List of the High Court.

He heard several notable defamation cases. In 2018 he was the trial judge for Paudie Coffey against the Kilkenny People, Paddy McKillen against the Irish Daily Mail, and Maurice McCabe against The Irish Times. He presided over Denis O'Brien against The Sunday Business Post and Gerald Kean against the Irish Daily Star in 2019.

Barton issued an arrest warrant for a juror who failed to return to court during a defamation case in July 2019.

He retired as a judge in March 2021.

== Personal life and death ==
Barton was married to Anne Marie with whom he has four children. He was a member of the Military and Hospitaller Order of Saint Lazarus of Jerusalem and a former Grand Prior of the Grand Priory of Ireland. Prior to his appointment to the High Court, he was a member of Fine Gael. Barton died after a short illness on 6 August 2026.
