= Séamus Egan (judge) =

Irish judge

Judge of the Supreme Court
- In office 3 May 1991 – 30 November 1995
- Nominated by: Government of Ireland
- Appointed by: Mary Robinson

Judge of the High Court
- In office 29 June 1984 – 3 May 1991
- Nominated by: Government of Ireland
- Appointed by: Patrick Hillery

Personal details
- Born: 1 December 1923 Dublin, Ireland
- Died: 23 January 2004 (aged 80) Dublin, Ireland
- Spouse: Ada Leahy (m. 1951)
- Children: 7
- Education: University College Dublin; King's Inns

Séamus Francis Egan (1 December 1923 – 23 January 2004) was an Irish judge and barrister who served as a Judge of the Supreme Court from 1991 to 1995 and a Judge of the High Court from 1984 to 1991.

== Early life ==
Egan was born in 1923 in Dublin to James Egan and Christian O'Donnell. After attending Blackrock College, he completed a degree at University College Dublin; King's Inns followed to qualify as a barrister.

== Legal career ==
He was called to the bar in 1945 and became a senior counsel in 1962. He spent the early part of his career practising on the Western Circuit.

Between 1963 and 1964, he acted for Gladys Ryan in the case of Ryan v. The Attorney General, challenging the constitutionality of the fluoridation of water in Ireland. Though she was unsuccessful, the case established the right to bodily integrity under the Constitution of Ireland and developed the principles of unenumerated rights. In 1979, he represented Francis McGirl who was acquitted of the murder of Louis Mountbatten.

== Judicial career ==
=== High Court ===
He made his judicial declaration of office to become a judge of the High Court on 2 July 1984.

In addition to his duties in the High Court, he began presiding over trials in the Special Criminal Court in 1988.

=== Supreme Court ===
Egan was appointed to the Supreme Court of Ireland in 1991. He was one of five judges who decided the X Case in 1992, allowing the appeal of the girl, and in 1995 he issued a dissenting opinion in Re. a Ward of Court where he held that the removal of a tube providing food to a woman would be equivalent to killing her. He also wrote a dissent in a case involving Patricia McKenna challenging the constitutionality of the government's campaigning for the Fifteenth Amendment of the Constitution of Ireland.

He retired on 30 November 1995. He was replaced by Donal Barrington.

=== Hepatitis C Compensation Tribunal ===
Following his retirement, he was appointed to chair the Hepatitis C Compensation Tribunal.

== Personal life ==
Egan was married to Ada Leahy with whom he had seven children. He built a house on Shrewsbury Road which he sold in 1989. He died in January 2004 at the age of 80. His removal was attended by the Chief Justice Ronan Keane, the Attorney General Rory Brady and the aide-de-camp to the President.
