= Marguerite Bolger =

Irish barrister, High Court judge

The Hon. Ms. Justice Marguerite Bolger

Judge of the High Court
- Incumbent
- Assumed office 13 January 2022
- Nominated by: Government of Ireland
- Appointed by: Michael D. Higgins

Personal details
- Born: Kilkenny, Ireland
- Education: Trinity College Dublin; King's Inns

Marguerite Bolger is an Irish judge and lawyer who has served as a Judge of the High Court since January 2022. She previously practiced as a barrister, where she specialised in employment law.

== Early life ==
Bolger is from County Kilkenny. She was born to Elaine Murphy and John Bolger, who was Mayor of Kilkenny in 1999. She attended secondary school at Presentation Secondary School, Kilkenny and later received LLB and MLitt degrees.

== Legal career ==
She was called to the Irish bar in 1993, and became a senior counsel in 2009. She primarily practiced in the area of employment law. She has appeared in cases before the Supreme Court of Ireland and the European Court of Justice. Her clients included both employees and employers, including RTÉ, the Irish Society for Prevention of Cruelty to Animals, An Post, Cork City F.C., and the Central Bank of Ireland.

In August 2021, she was appointed by the Irish government to chair negotiations with hospital consultants about entering into the Sláintecare system.

She has written several legal texts, including the first edition of a book on Irish criminal law with Peter Charleton and Paul Anthony McDermott and the books Sex Discrimination and the Law and Employment Equality Law. Bolger is a former chairperson of the Employment Bar Association of Ireland and served on the executive board of the Irish Council for Civil Liberties. She was re-appointed for a second three-year term as chair of the Panel of Enquiry at Trinity College Dublin in June 2020.

In 2016, her former assistant was convicted in the Circuit Court of stealing €28,000 from her.

== Judicial career ==
Bolger was one of five people nominated to the High Court in September 2021. Her appointment was delayed due to ongoing work on behalf of the State. She was appointed in January 2022.
