= Elizabeth Dunne =

Irish Supreme Court judge (born 1956)

The Hon. Ms. Justice Elizabeth Dunne

Judge of the Supreme Court of Ireland
- In office 27 July 2013 – 24 February 2026
- Nominated by: Government of Ireland
- Appointed by: Michael D. Higgins

Judge of the High Court
- In office 15 November 2004 – 27 July 2013
- Nominated by: Government of Ireland
- Appointed by: Mary McAleese

Judge of the Circuit Court
- In office 1 December 1996 – 15 November 2004
- Nominated by: Government of Ireland
- Appointed by: Mary Robinson

Personal details
- Born: 12 January 1956 (age 70) Roscommon, Ireland
- Spouse: James Dwyer (m. 1984)
- Children: 2
- Education: University College Dublin; King's Inns

Elizabeth Dunne (born 12 January 1956) is a retired Irish judge. She served as a Judge of the Supreme Court of Ireland from July 2013 to February 2026. She previously served as a Judge of the High Court from 2004 to 2013 and a Judge of the Circuit Court from 1996 to 2004.

== Early career ==
Dunne was educated at University College Dublin and received a Bachelor of Civil Law degree and then subsequently studied at the King's Inns. She was called to the Bar in 1977. She had a broad practice, encompassing family, commercial, chancery and banking law and defamation law proceedings.

In 1986, she appeared on The Late Late Show with Harry Whelehan in a simulated court argument to advocate a vote in favour of the Fifteenth Amendment of the Constitution of Ireland. She co-signed a letter in 1983 opposing the Eighth Amendment.

She became a Bencher of the King's Inns in 2004.

== Judicial career ==
=== Circuit Court ===
Dunne was appointed a Judge of the Circuit Court in 1996. She was primarily a judge on the Dublin Circuit Criminal Court. She also heard cases involving personal injuries and employment law.

=== High Court ===
She became a Judge of the High Court in 2004.

Dunne was the chairperson of the Referendum Commission established for the 32nd Amendment Bill 2013 and 33rd Amendment of the Constitution.

=== Supreme Court ===
She served as a judge of the Supreme Court from 2013 to 2026, having been appointed by President Michael D. Higgins, on the nomination of the Government of Ireland in July 2013.

== Personal life ==
She is married to James Dwyer, a barrister. Their two children Daniel and Lucy are both barristers.
