= James Murnaghan =

Judge of the Supreme Court
- In office 3 June 1925 – 26 September 1953
- Nominated by: Government of Ireland
- Appointed by: Tim Healy

Judge of the High Court
- In office 11 March 1924 – 2 June 1925
- Nominated by: Government of Ireland
- Appointed by: Tim Healy

Personal details
- Born: 19 April 1881 Dublin, Ireland
- Died: 7 January 1973 (aged 91) Dublin, Ireland
- Spouse: Alice Davy (m. 1910)
- Children: 3
- Parent: George Murnaghan (father)
- Education: Royal University of Ireland; University College Dublin; King's Inns

James Augustine Murnaghan (19 April 1881 – 20 January 1973) was an Irish judge who served as a Judge of the Supreme Court from 1925 to 1953 and a Judge of the High Court from 1924 to 1925.

He attended University College Dublin and held the degrees of BA and LLD from the Royal University of Ireland. He also attended the King's Inns and was admitted to the degree of Barrister–at–Law in 1903.

He was Professor of Jurisprudence and Roman Law at the School of Law at University College Dublin from 1911 to 1924, where he also taught international law.

He was appointed as a High Court judge in 1924. He served on the bench of the Supreme Court from 1925 to 1953.

He was the son of George Murnaghan, an Irish nationalist MP for Mid Tyrone, and was married to Alice Murnaghan.

In 1973, his widow Alice, established the James Murnaghan Memorial Prize at King's Inns.

He and his wife were avid collectors of paintings, silverware and porcelain. In December 1988, Alice Murnaghan's home was raided by a gang run by Martin Cahill. Items totalling £288,000 in value were stolen, about half were subsequently recovered.
