= William Black (judge) =

Judge of the Supreme Court
- In office 14 November 1942 – 28 February 1951
- Nominated by: Government of Ireland
- Appointed by: Douglas Hyde

Judge of the High Court
- In office 20 July 1939 – 14 November 1942
- Nominated by: Government of Ireland
- Appointed by: Douglas Hyde

Personal details
- Born: 22 September 1879 Holywood, County Down, Ireland
- Died: 11 March 1967 (aged 87) Dalkey, Dublin, Ireland
- Spouse: Julia O'Connor (m. 1910)
- Children: 3
- Education: Trinity College Dublin; King's Inns

William Bullick Black KC (22 September 1879 – 11 March 1967) was an Irish judge and barrister who served as a Judge of the Supreme Court from 1942 to 1951 and a Judge of the High Court from 1939 to 1942.

== Early life and education ==
Black was born in Holywood, County Down, in 1879. Black's father, James, was a Methodist minister. He was educated at Methodist College Belfast and later at Trinity College Dublin.

== Career ==
Black attended the King's Inns, Dublin, where he qualified as a barrister. At King's Inns, he won a number of debating and oratorical prizes before he was called to the Bar in 1901.

Black was a campaigner for Sinn Féin before later supporting Fianna Fáil.

In 1939, Black was appointed a High Court judge. Then, in 1942, he was made a judge of the Supreme Court of Ireland and served until 1951. He dissented against the ruling in the Corcoran case (1950) and also the 1951 Tilson case that enforced the Ne Temere decree.

The Council of Europe elected Black as Ireland's representative in the European Commission of Human Rights in 1954.

== Personal life ==
He was married to Julia O'Connor with whom he had three children with.
