= Martin Maguire =

Irish judge and barrister (born 1938)

Judge of the Supreme Court
- In office 1954–1961
- Nominated by: Government of Ireland
- Appointed by: Seán T. O'Kelly

Judge of the High Court
- In office 1940–1954
- Nominated by: Government of Ireland
- Appointed by: Douglas Hyde

Personal details
- Born: Dublin, Ireland
- Education: Trinity College Dublin; King's Inns

Martin C. Maguire was an Irish judge and barrister who served as a judge of the High Court from 1940 to 1954, and of the Supreme Court from 1954 to 1961.

== Biography ==
Maguire was educated at MacCartan's College, Monaghan; Blackrock College, Dublin; Trinity College Dublin and King's Inns.

He was called to the Bar in 1911 and became a Senior Counsel in 1925. He was the chairman of the Mining Board between 1932 and 1940. He was elected as a bencher of the King's Inns in 1937.

Maguire was appointed to the High Court in 1940, and to the Supreme Court in 1954, where he served until his retirement in 1961.
