= Frank Griffin (judge) =

Irish judge (1919–2016)

Judge of the Supreme Court
- In office 7 July 1973 – 12 March 1991
- Nominated by: Government of Ireland
- Appointed by: Erskine H. Childers

Judge of the High Court
- In office 9 February 1971 – 7 July 1973
- Nominated by: Government of Ireland
- Appointed by: Éamon de Valera

Personal details
- Born: 12 March 1919 Dartry, Dublin, Ireland
- Died: 5 June 2016 (aged 97) Dublin, Ireland
- Spouse: Helen Griffin (m. 1935; died 1999)
- Children: 6
- Education: University College Dublin; King's Inns

Frank James Griffin (12 March 1919 – 5 June 2016) was an Irish judge who served as a Judge of the Supreme Court from 1973 to 1991 and a Judge of the High Court from 1971 to 1973.

Griffin was a Judge-in-Residence at University College Dublin in the Sutherland School of Law. From 1991 to 1996, he served as President of the Council of the Royal Victoria Eye and Ear Hospital. His son, Gerry Griffin, serves as judge on the Irish Circuit Court. He died in 2016, at the age of 97.
