= Marie Baker =

Irish Court of Appeal judge since 2018

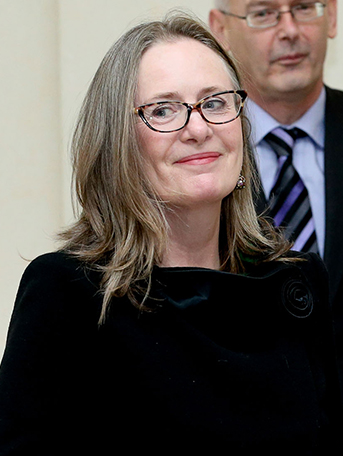
- Baker in 2014

Judge of the Supreme Court
- In office 2 December 2019 – 15 April 2024
- Nominated by: Government of Ireland
- Appointed by: Michael D. Higgins

Judge of the Court of Appeal
- In office 28 June 2018 – 2 December 2019
- Nominated by: Government of Ireland
- Appointed by: Michael D. Higgins

Judge of the High Court
- In office 8 January 2014 – 28 June 2018
- Nominated by: Government of Ireland
- Appointed by: Michael D. Higgins

Personal details
- Born: 6 February 1954 (age 72) Dublin, Ireland
- Education: University College Cork; King's Inns

Marie Baker (born 6 February 1954) is an Irish judge who served as a Judge of the Supreme Court from 2019 to 2024, a Judge of the Court of Appeal from 2018 to 2019, and a Judge of the High Court from 2014 to 2018.

== Early career ==
Baker was educated at University College Cork, where she received BA, MA and BCL degrees. She later attended and studied at the King's Inns and became a barrister in 1984 and a senior counsel in 2004. Her practice predominantly focused on commercial law, conveyancing, family law and litigation. She specialised on cases involving the National Asset Management Agency towards the end of her career as a barrister. She was a member of the Study Group on Pre-nuptial Agreements, which reported to the Minister for Justice, Equality and Law Reform in 2007. She has previously acted as a part-time commissioner of the Law Reform Commission and lectured in several areas of law.

== Judicial career ==
=== High Court ===
She was appointed to the High Court in January 2014. She sat in on a three-judge division of the High Court in December 2014 in the case of PP v. HSE.

=== Court of Appeal ===
Baker was elevated to the Court of Appeal in June 2018. She holds a statutory position as the designated judge for the purpose of two acts: the Interception of Postal Packets and Telecommunications Messages (Regulation) Act 1993 and the Communications (Retention of Data) Act 2011. In this role she produces an annual report for the Oireachtas. She also communicates with the Taoiseach in relation to privacy and interception of communications issues.

=== Supreme Court ===
She was appointed to the Supreme Court in December 2019. Her appointment followed the retirement of Susan Denham in 2018. Her first sitting on the court occurred on 16 January 2020, marking the first time four women had sat together on the Supreme Court.

Baker is the Assigned Judge for the Irish courts to supervise the use of personal data while courts act in their judicial capacity.

== Electoral Commission ==
Baker also serves as chairperson of the Electoral Commission of Ireland. Chief Justice Donal O'Donnell appointed her to that position when the commission was established in 2023.
