= Frank Clarke (judge) =

Chief Justice of Ireland from 2017 to 2021

Chief Justice of Ireland
- In office 28 July 2017 – 10 October 2021
- Nominated by: Government of Ireland
- Appointed by: Michael D. Higgins
- Preceded by: Susan Denham
- Succeeded by: Donal O'Donnell

President of the Law Reform Commission
- Incumbent
- Assumed office 23 July 2022
- Nominated by: Government of Ireland
- Preceded by: Mary Laffoy

Judge of the Supreme Court
- In office 15 March 2012 – 10 October 2021
- Nominated by: Government of Ireland
- Appointed by: Michael D. Higgins

Judge of the High Court
- In office 15 November 2004 – 15 March 2012
- Nominated by: Government of Ireland
- Appointed by: Mary McAleese

Personal details
- Born: 10 October 1951 (age 74) Walkinstown, Dublin, Ireland
- Spouse: Jacqueline Hayden (m. 1977)
- Children: 2
- Education: University College Dublin; King's Inns

George Bernard Francis Clarke (born 10 October 1951) is an Irish barrister and judge who has served as President of the Law Reform Commission since July 2022. He previously served as Chief Justice of Ireland from 2017 to 2021. Clarke had a successful career as a barrister for many years, with a broad commercial and public law practice. He was the chair of the Bar Council of Ireland between 1993 and 1995. He was appointed to the High Court in 2004, and he became a judge of the Supreme Court in February 2012. After retiring from the bench, he returned to work as a barrister. He is also currently the President of the Irish Society for European Law.

Across his career as a barrister and a judge, he has been involved in many seminal cases in Irish legal history.

== Early life and education ==
Clarke was born on 10 October 1951, in Walkinstown, Dublin. He is the son of a customs officer who died when he was aged eleven; his mother was a secretary. He was educated at Drimnagh Castle Secondary School, a Christian Brothers secondary school in Dublin. He won the Dublin Junior High Jump Championship in 1969. He studied Economics and Maths at undergraduate level in University College Dublin, while he concurrently studied to become a barrister at King's Inns. He was the first of his family to attend third-level education and was able to attend university by receiving grants. While attending University College Dublin, he lost an election to Adrian Hardiman to become auditor of the L&H.

He joined Fine Gael after leaving school. He was a speechwriter for Taoiseach Garret FitzGerald and election agent for George Birmingham; he then subsequently himself, ran for election to Seanad Éireann. He campaigned against the Eighth Amendment of the Constitution of Ireland in 1983 and favour of the unsuccessful Tenth Amendment of the Constitution in 1986. He chaired a meeting of family lawyers in 1995 supporting the successful second referendum on divorce.

== Legal career ==
He was called to the Bar in 1973 and the Inner Bar in 1985. He practised commercial, constitutional and family law. Two years after commencing practice he appeared as junior counsel for the applicant in State (Healy) v Donoghue before the Supreme Court, which established a constitutional right to legal aid in criminal cases.

Clarke represented Michael McGimpsey and his brother Christopher in a challenge against the constitutionality of the Anglo-Irish Agreement, which was ultimately unsuccessful in the Supreme Court in 1988.

He appeared for the plaintiff with Michael McDowell and Gerard Hogan in Cox v Ireland in 1990, where the Supreme Court first introduced proportionality into Irish constitutional law and discovered the right to earn a livelihood. He represented Seán Ardagh and the Oireachtas Subcommittee formed after the death of John Carthy in a constitutional case which limited the powers of investigation of the Oireachtas, which led to the unsuccessful Thirtieth Amendment of the Constitution. In an action taken by tobacco companies to challenge the legality of bans on tobacco advertising, he appeared for the State.

Clarke was twice appointed by the Supreme Court for Article 26 references. He argued on behalf of the Law Society of Ireland in a referral regarding the Adoption (No. 2) Bill 1987. He was appointed by the Supreme Court to appear to argue on behalf of the rights of the mother in In re Article 26 and the Regulation of Information (Services outside the State for Termination of Pregnancies) Bill 1995. In 1994, President Mary Robinson requested him to provide her with legal advice on the presidential prerogative to refuse to dissolve Dáil Éireann.

He was external counsel to the Commission to Inquire into Child Abuse and represented the Flood Tribunal in its case against Liam Lawlor and the State in Charles Haughey's challenge to the legality of the Moriarty Tribunal. He and George Birmingham also appeared for Fine Gael at the Flood Tribunal, and he represented the public interest at the Moriarty Tribunal. He was a legal advisor to an inquiry into Deposit interest retention tax conducted by the Public Accounts Committee, along with future judicial colleagues Paul Gilligan and Mary Irvine.

He was Chairman of the Bar Council of Ireland from 1993 to 1995. Between 1999 and 2004, he acted as chair of Council of King's Inns. He was a professor at the Kings' Inns between 1978 and 1985. He was appointed an adjunct professor at University College Cork in 2014. He has also been an adjunct professor at Trinity College Dublin.

Clarke acted as a chair of the Employment Appeals Tribunal while still in practice. He was also a steward of the Turf Club and was the chairman of Leopardstown Racecourse. He was due to take over as senior steward of the Turf Club but did not do so due to his appointment to the High Court.

Clarke was appointed as a High Court judge in 2004. He was appointed to the Supreme Court on 9 February 2012 and served as Chief Justice from July 2017 until his retirement upon reaching the statutory retirement age of 70 on 10 October 2021.

Following his retirement from the judiciary, Clarke resumed his practice as a barrister and is currently a member of the Bar of Ireland. Under the rules of the Bar of Ireland, he cannot appear before a court of equal or lesser jurisdiction to that on which he sat as a judge. Since he was the most senior judge in Ireland, he could not appear in any court there. He can appear in the EU courts. However, he has indicated that he intends to focus on mediation and arbitration work.

== Judicial career ==
=== High Court ===
He was appointed a Judge of the High Court in 2004. He was chairman of the Referendum Commission for the second Lisbon Treaty referendum in 2009. As a High Court judge he gave a ruling, on the Leas Cross nursing home case against RTÉ, that the public interest justified the broadcasting of material that otherwise would have been protected by the right to privacy. He frequently presided over the Commercial Court during his time at the High Court. He was involved in the establishment of two High Court lists in Cork, Chancery and a Non-Jury List.

During his eight years there, he heard a broad range of civil cases in the High Court. He was the judge in cases involving injunctions, personal injuries, judicial review, immigration law, constitutional law, intellectual property law, land law, insolvency law and tax law.

In 2007, he presided over a dispute involving the lease of Bewley's of Grafton Street and unsuccessful claims by Catherine Murphy and Finian McGrath over the composition of electoral constituency boundaries. Beginning in 2009 he oversaw the examinership process of Liam Carroll's Zoe Developments Group and separately an action involving the Irish branch of HSBC related to Bernie Madoff. He sat in a three-judge division of the High Court with Nicholas Kearns and Peter Kelly in 2010 in challenge by Paddy McKillen over the transfer of loans to the National Asset Management Agency. Their decision was overturned in part on appeal to the Supreme Court in Dellway Investment Limited v. NAMA. He presided over hearings arising from an action taken by the Irish Bank Resolution Corporation against Seán Quinn in 2011.

=== Supreme Court ===
Clarke was first appointed to the Supreme Court in March 2012.

=== Judgments ===
Ruadhán Mac Cormaic of The Irish Times said on his appointment as Chief Justice that Clarke has a "reputation for fair-mindedness and authority, and for judgments that were incisive and clear". He also noted that he tended not to share an "absolute pro-defendant" attitude to criminal law matters with some Supreme Court colleagues, while also having the perception of more liberal positions than other judges on surrogacy and social issues.

The judges of the Supreme Court have frequently relied on Clarke to write judgments for the court in cases involving public law. He delivered the judgments of the court in Kerins v. McGuinness and O'Brien v Clerk of Dáil Éireann which clarified the law of parliamentary privilege in Ireland. In 2018 he wrote an opinion on behalf of a seven-judge panel which held that references of "unborn" under the Eighth Amendment of the Constitution of Ireland referred to an unborn child and the rights conferred upon an unborn child were confined to that section. His judgment in Friends of the Irish Environment v Government of Ireland "recharacterized" the approach of the Supreme Court to unenumerated rights, instead considering them "derived rights" under the Constitution of Ireland.

He has contributed significantly to the Supreme Court's 2010s jurisprudence on the rights of persons accused of crimes. Clarke wrote the opinion of a unanimous court in a combined judgment of DPP v Gormley and DPP v White, holding that police questioning cannot begin until an accused person has received legal advice. He was part of the majority in DPP v. JC in 2015 where the court departed from its precedent regarding the exclusionary rule in Ireland, with Clarke devising a new test to assess the constitutionality of evidence obtained by Gardaí.

His judgment in Okunade v. Minister for Justice & Others laid down the test for the courts to grant a mandatory injunction. In 2020, John MacMenamin. Clarke co-authored a judgment in University College Cork v. ESB which presented a new authoritative statement regarding liability in negligence in Ireland. His judgment in Morrissey v. HSE developed the law on the standard of care in clinical negligence cases.

=== Chief Justice of Ireland ===
On 26 July 2017, it was announced that the Government of Ireland had agreed to nominate Judge Clarke for appointment by the President of Ireland as the next Chief Justice of Ireland to succeed Susan Denham on the expiry of her term of office. He was the sole name put forward to the cabinet for consideration. He applied for the position which included a 500-word application. Upon his appointment, he said it was not "unreasonable" to suggest that he was "socially progressive" while acknowledging his oath of judicial independence. He was appointed in July 2017.

Clarke identified his priorities upon appointment to be to increase access to justice and the legal profession, to improve support and training for judges, and to expand the use of technology in the courts. Some of these priorities were realised with the creation of a Judicial Studies Committee with a High Court judge serving as Director of Judicial Studies and the COVID-19 pandemic causing a substantial increase in the use of technology. He oversaw the first live broadcast of the Supreme Court on television in October 2017. The Supreme Court held sittings in Limerick and NUI Galway in 2018 and 2019, the second and third times hearings took place outside of Dublin.

Clarke serves on a judicial advisory committee for appointments of judges and advocates general to the Court of Justice of the European Union.

In his role as Chief Justice, he was involved in the second inauguration ceremony of President Michael D. Higgins on 11 November 2018 at Dublin Castle. He read out the Declaration of Office for Higgins to sign and then presented the president with his seal of office.

==== Golfgate ====
The Supreme Court and Clarke, in particular, came under significant public scrutiny as a result of the Oireachtas Golf Society scandal ("Golfgate"). In August 2021, Séamus Woulfe attended a dinner organised by the Oireachtas Golf Society amid the COVID-19 pandemic, one month after being appointed to the Supreme Court. The Supreme Court asked formed Chief Justice Denham to investigate Woulfe's attendance. After the publication of her report, Clarke sought on several occasions to meet with Woulfe. Eventually Clarke published correspondence between himself and Woulfe where he said in his opinion Woulfe should resign. Woulfe did not resign and began hearing cases in February 2021, following Clarke's suggestion to resolve the dispute informally.

Clarke's handling of Golfgate received widespread commentary and mixed reactions. His options to discipline Woulfe were limited as the judicial council legislation was not fully commenced. The Director General of the Law Society of Ireland said Clarke's actions were a "misstep" and that "irreparable damage" had occurred.

=== Retirement ===
Clarke was required by law to retire on 10 October 2021, his 70th birthday, and in March 2021 the Cabinet began the process of identifying his successor. Donal O'Donnell was selected to replace him. His final day in court was on 8 October 2021, where judges, lawyers and civil servants made a large number of tributes to him. Mary Carolan of The Irish Times said that under his leadership the Supreme Court is "perhaps the most collegial it had been in some time". Following his retirement, he returned to work as a barrister and rejoined the Bar of Ireland, although in line with Bar Council rules, he cannot appear before any court of equal or lesser jurisdiction to the court he sat on, meaning he cannot appear before any Irish court.

In June 2022 he was sworn in as judge of the court of appeal of the Dubai International Financial Centre (DIFC) courts but resigned a few days later following criticism from barrister and Labour Party leader, Ivana Bacik.

Clarke is a board member of the Child Law Project.

== Personal life ==
He has been married to Dr. Jacqueline Hayden since 1977. They sold their house on Sorrento Terrace, facing Dalkey Island, in 2004. They have a son who is a barrister and a daughter who is a carer. He is interested in rugby and horse racing, at one point owning several horses.

Legal offices
Preceded by Susan Denham	Chief Justice of Ireland; 2017–2021	Succeeded by Donal O'Donnell
