= Chief Justice of Ireland =

Head of the judiciary of the Republic of Ireland

- Príomh-Bhreitheamh na hÉireann (Irish)
- Supreme Court of Ireland

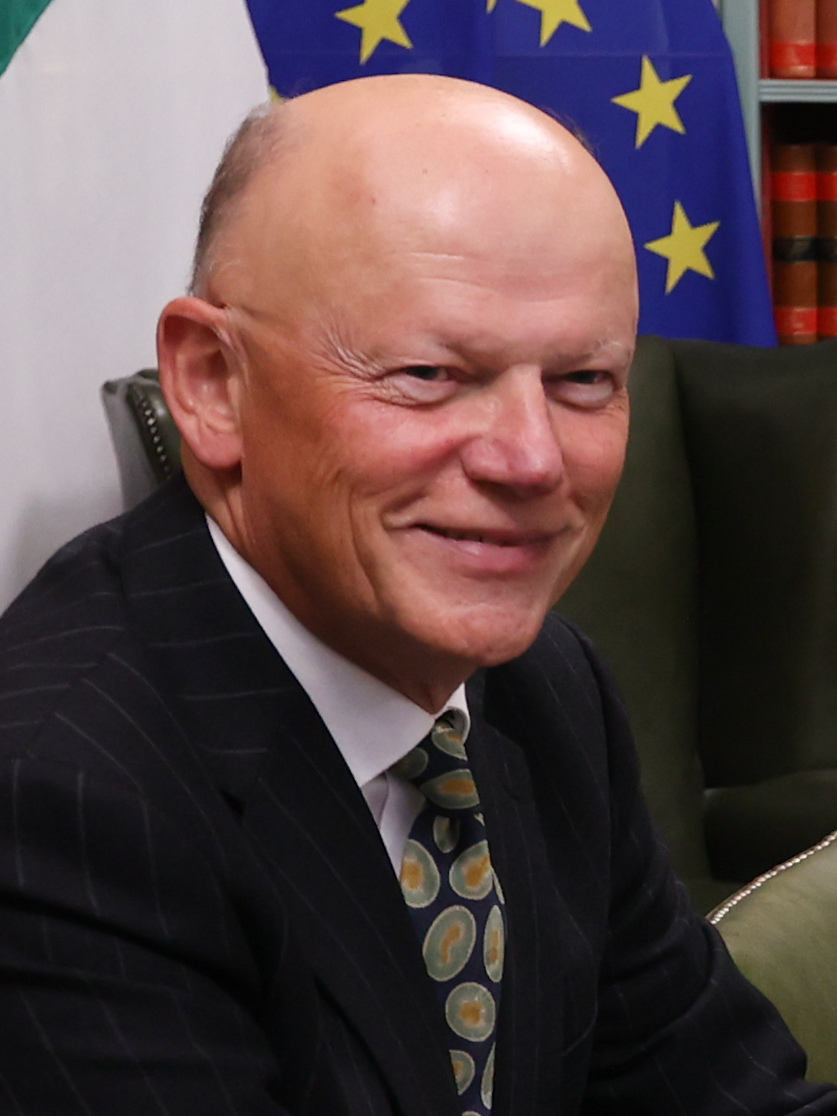
- Incumbent; Donal O'Donnell since 11 October 2021
- Judiciary of Ireland
- Style: The Honourable
- Member of: Supreme Court; Council of State; Presidential Commission; Board of the Courts Service
- Seat: Four Courts
- Nominator: Government
- Appointer: President
- Constituting instrument: Article 34 of the Constitution; Courts (Establishment and Constitution) Act, 1961
- Precursor: Lord Chief Justice of Ireland
- Inaugural holder: Hugh Kennedy
- Formation: 24 June 1924; 102 years ago
- Salary: €295,916

The chief justice of Ireland (Irish: Príomh-Bhreitheamh na hÉireann) is the president of the Supreme Court of Ireland. The chief justice is the highest judicial office and the most senior judge in the Republic of Ireland. The role includes several constitutional and administrative duties, in addition to taking part in ordinary judicial proceedings.

The current chief justice is Donal O'Donnell.

== Background ==
The chief justice of the Supreme Court was created under the Courts of Justice Act 1924. Before 1922 the lord chancellor of Ireland was the highest judicial office in Ireland. Between 1922 and 1924, the lord chief Justice of Ireland was the most senior judge in the Irish Free State. The Supreme Court sits in the Four Courts. When the Supreme Court sits, as it mostly does, in two chambers, the second chamber sits in the Hugh Kennedy Court, named after the first chief justice.

== Appointment and tenure ==
The position of chief justice is filled following the nomination by the cabinet of the Irish government and appointed by the president of Ireland. There is no legislation governing the appointment of the position. Traditionally an informal process took place where the taoiseach, tánaiste, attorney general of Ireland, and minister for justice would privately consult to bring a proposed appointee to cabinet. For the appointment of Frank Clarke, an ad hoc committee composed of the president of the Court of Appeal, the attorney general and the chairperson of the Top Level Appointments Committee was formed to make a recommendation to the government. The committee opened applications and received 500-word statements from candidates outlining their suitability for the role. A shortlist of three judges was proposed.

On appointment, the chief justice is required to make a declaration of office in the presence of the president.

In the event of illness or vacancy of the post, the role of chief justice is exercised by the president of the Court of Appeal.

The term of chief justice lasts for seven years, or until reaching the mandatory retirement age of seventy. While still serving as judges, former chief justices rank fourth in the judicial order of precedence, after the incumbent chief justice and the presidents of the Court of Appeal and the High Court. John L. Murray continued to serve as a judge of the Supreme Court after his seven-year term had concluded.

== Duties and roles ==
The chief justice is the president of the Supreme Court.

=== Judicial function ===
The chief justice often presides in cases involving the constitutionality of legislation and references made by the president following consultation with the Council of State.

=== Constitutional roles ===
Under the Constitution of Ireland, the chief justice occupies ex officio positions. The chief justice is one of three members of the Presidential Commission which acts jointly to perform the duties of the president of Ireland in the event of temporary absence, incapacity or death. The president of the Court of Appeal acts for the chief justice if the position is vacant or the holder unable to act. The chief justice is a member of the Council of State. Former officeholders continue to be members of the Council of State so long as they are "able and willing to act".

The declarations of office made by all Irish judges take place in the presence of the chief justice. If the chief justice is unavailable, the role is deputised by the most senior available Supreme Court judge.

The chief justice is involved in authenticating updated enrolments of the Constitution of Ireland. The chief justice and the taoiseach sign the text in preparation for the president's signature. Enrolments have taken place in 1938, 1942, 1980, 1990, 1999 and 2018.

Although not outlined in the Constitution, the chief justice has a longstanding role in presidential inaugurations in Dublin Castle. The chief justice reads the declaration of office to the president-elect which is repeated back by the president-elect before putting their signature to the declaration.

=== Statutory roles ===
The chief justice is designated multiple roles under legislation. They are responsible for appointing notaries public and commissioners of oaths and exercise jurisdiction over the discipline of solicitors, and for calling barristers to the Outer Bar and the Inner Bar. They nominate the chairperson of the Referendum Commission under s. 2(5) of the Referendum Act 1998 and appoints a judge to chair the Constituency Commission. Following a request from the Minister for Justice, the chief justice nominates a serving judge to hold an inquiry into a designated member of the Garda Síochána Ombudsman Commission.

The chief justice is an ex officio member of the Court of Appeal and the High Court.

The chief justice may issue practice directions for the operations of the courts.

=== Courts administration ===
The chief justice is central to the operation of the judiciary and the courts in Ireland. The chief justice chairs Board of the Courts Service. Frank Clarke identified reforming priorities upon his appointment to the role. The chief justice additionally chairs key positions for judicial administration including the Judicial Appointments Advisory Board, the Judicial Council, the Superior Courts Rules Committee, the Judicial Conduct Committee and the advisory committee on the grant of Patents of Precedence.

Frequently the chief justice represents the judiciary to the government.

== List of chief justices ==
No.	Name	Term of office		Nominated by	Appointed by	Notes
1	Hugh Kennedy	24 June 1924	1 December 1936	W. T. Cosgrave (2nd EC)	Timothy Healy	Previously served as the first Attorney General of Ireland. Died in office.
2	Timothy Sullivan	1 December 1936	1 June 1946	Éamon de Valera (7th EC)	Domhnall Ua Buachalla	Previously served as President of the High Court.
3	Conor Maguire	1 June 1946	11 June 1961	Éamon de Valera (4th Gov.)	Seán T. O'Kelly	Previously served as President of the High Court.
4	Cearbhall Ó Dálaigh (Note: During his legal career, Ó Dálaigh was also known as Carroll O'Daly. See for instance The Irish Law Times and Solicitors' Journal, vol. 103 (1970), p. 289: "The Chief Justice the Hon. Carroll O'Daly".)	16 June 1961	22 September 1973	Seán Lemass (9th Gov.)	Éamon de Valera	Previously served as Attorney General. Resigned as Chief Justice on appointment as a judge of the European Court of Justice following Ireland's accession to the European Union.
5	William FitzGerald	25 September 1973	17 October 1974	Jack Lynch (13th Gov.)	Éamon de Valera	Died in office
6	Tom O'Higgins	17 October 1974	1 October 1985	Liam Cosgrave (14th Gov.)	Erskine H. Childers	Resigned on appointment as a judge of the European Court of Justice.
7	Thomas Finlay	10 October 1985	16 March 1994	Garret FitzGerald (19th Gov.)	Patrick Hillery	Previously served as a President of the High Court.
8	Liam Hamilton	22 March 1994	1 June 2000	Albert Reynolds (23rd Gov.)	Mary Robinson	Previously served as President of the High Court.
9	Ronan Keane	1 June 2000	23 July 2004	Bertie Ahern (25th Gov.)	Mary McAleese	Previously head of the Tribunal of Inquiry into the Stardust fire, and chairman of the Law Reform Commission.
10	John L. Murray	23 July 2004	25 July 2011	Bertie Ahern (26th Gov.)	Mary McAleese	Previously served as Attorney General, and as judge of the European Court of Justice.
11	Susan Denham	25 July 2011	28 July 2017	Enda Kenny (29th Gov.)	Mary McAleese	First woman Chief Justice.
12	Frank Clarke	28 July 2017	10 October 2021	Leo Varadkar (31st Gov.)	Michael D. Higgins	
13	Donal O'Donnell	11 October 2021	Incumbent	Micheál Martin (32nd Gov.)	Michael D. Higgins	Second person to have been appointed as a judge of the Supreme Court directly from practicing at the bar.

== See also ==
- Brehon
- List of judges of the Supreme Court of Ireland
- Lord Chancellor of Ireland
- Lord Chief Justice of Ireland
- Lord Chief Justice of Northern Ireland
- Master of the Rolls in Ireland
