= Law Reform Commission (Ireland) =

Statutory body in Ireland

The Law Reform Commission (Irish: Coimisiún um Athchóiriú an Dlí; also called the Law Reform Commission of Ireland) is a law commission which was established in 1975 to examine the law of the Republic of Ireland.

== Activities ==
The Commission was established on 20 October 1975 under the Law Reform Commission Act 1975. It is an independent body which examines areas of the law and proposes reforms or changes.

According to its website, 70% of its proposals have resulted in the enactment of legislation effecting reforms. The website says that the Commission is currently engaged in its Fifth Programme of Law Reform including the Statute Law Revision Programme.

== Members ==
As of April 2025, the members of the Commission are:

- Frank Clarke, president of the Commission, former Chief Justice of Ireland
- Richard Barrett, former Deputy Director General of the Office of the Attorney General
- Maurice Collins, judge of the Supreme Court
- Dr Andrea Mulligan
- Supreme Court of Ireland, judge of the High Court

== Functions ==
Section 4(1) of the Law Reform Commission Act 1975 provides:

The Commission shall keep the law under review and in accordance with the provisions of this Act shall undertake examinations and conduct research with a view to reforming the law and formulate proposals for law reform.

By section 1,

- "the law" means the law of the State (including any private or public international law) and includes matters of legal practice or procedure, and "law" must be construed accordingly
- "reform" includes, in relation to the law or a branch of the law, its development, its codification (including in particular its simplification and modernisation) and the revision and consolidation of statute law, and kindred words must be construed accordingly.

== See also ==
- Northern Ireland Law Commission
