= List of judges of the Court of Appeal (Ireland) =

List of judges

The Court of Appeal is a court in Ireland that sits between the High Court and Supreme Court and took over the existing appellate jurisdiction of the Supreme Court in 2014. It was established by the Courts of Justice Act 1924.

== Current members ==
Name	Appointed	Notes
Caroline Costello	November 2018	President since July 2024
John A. Edwards	December 2014	
Máire Whelan	June 2017	Attorney General 2011–2016
Patrick J. McCarthy	July 2018	
Isobel Kennedy	November 2018	
Seamus Noonan	November 2019	
Mary Faherty	November 2019	
Robert Haughton	November 2019	
Úna Ní Raifeartaigh	November 2019	
Ann Power	November 2019	
Donald Binchy	March 2020	
Teresa Pilkington	September 2020	
Nuala Butler	October 2022	
Charles Meenan	July 2023	
Tara Burns	July 2023	
Brian O'Moore	October 2023	
Michael MacGrath	July 2024	
Niamh Hyland	July 2024	
Anthony Collins	November 2024	
Denis McDonald	November 2024	
Donal O'Donnell	October 2021	ex officio 2021–present
David Barniville	August 2021	ex officio 2022–present

== Former members ==
- denotes Presidents

Name	Term of office	Notes
Nicholas Kearns	2014–2015	ex officio 2014–2015 as President of the High Court
Susan Denham	2014–2017	ex officio 2014–2017 as Chief Justice of Ireland
Garrett Sheehan	2014–2017	
Mary Finlay Geoghegan	2014–2017	Judge of the Supreme Court 2017-2019
Sean Ryan	2014–2018	First President of the Court of Appeal
Alan Mahon	2014–2018	
Gerard Hogan	2014–2018	Advocate General at the European Court of Justice
Michael Peart	2014–2019	
Peter Kelly	2014–2020	ex officio 2015–2020 as President of the High Court
Mary Irvine	2014–2019; 2020–2022	ex officio 2020–2022 as President of the High Court
John Hedigan	2016–2018	
Frank Clarke	2017–2021	ex officio 2017–2021 as Chief Justice of Ireland
Paul Gilligan	2018	
Marie Baker	2018–2019	Judge of the Supreme Court
Brian McGovern	2018–2020	
Brian Murray	2019–2022	Judge of the Supreme Court
Maurice Collins	2019–2022	Judge of the Supreme Court
Aileen Donnelly	2019–2023	Judge of the Supreme Court
George Birmingham	2014–2024	President from April 2018 to July 2024

== See also ==
- List of judges of the Supreme Court of Ireland
- List of judges of the High Court of Ireland
