= Four Courts =

Major court complex in Dublin, Ireland

The Four Courts
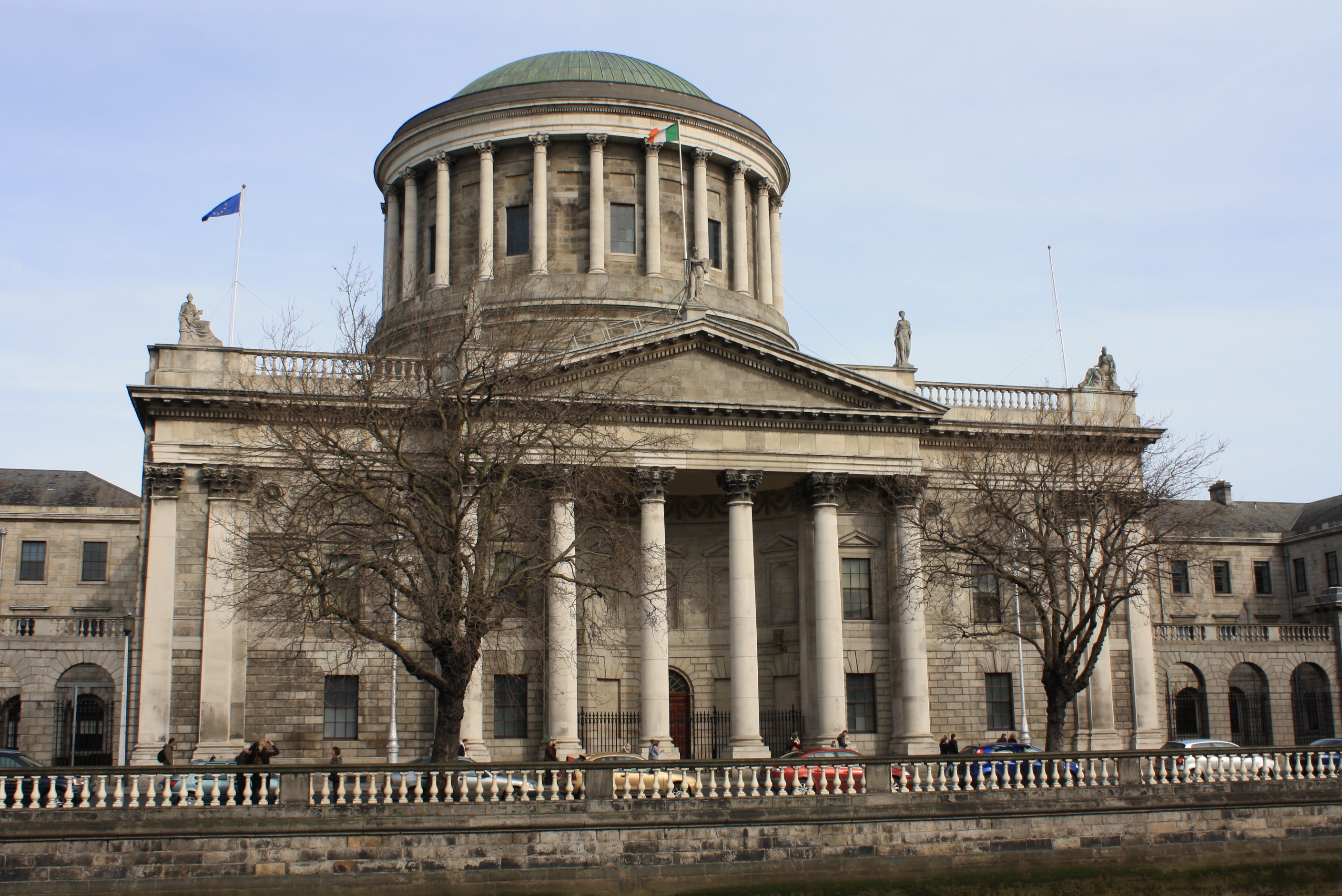
- The Four Courts

- Location within Central Dublin

General information
- Type: Courthouse
- Architectural style: Neoclassical
- Location: Inns Quay, Dublin, Ireland
- Coordinates: 53.3459°N 6.2735°W
- Elevation: 4 m (13 ft)
- Construction started: 1786
- Completed: 1802; 224 years ago
- Client: Kingdom of Ireland

Technical details
- Material: Portland stone, granite, copper, cast iron, timber, steel, stucco, sandstone

Design and construction
- Architects: Thomas Cooley (1776-84); James Gandon (1785-1802); Jacob Owen - Benchers' and Solicitors' building (1835-39)

The Four Courts (Irish: Na Ceithre Cúirteanna) is Ireland's most prominent courts building, located on Inns Quay in Dublin. The Four Courts is the principal seat of the Supreme Court, the Court of Appeal, the High Court and the Dublin Circuit Court. Until 2010 the building also housed the Central Criminal Court; this is now located in the Criminal Courts of Justice building.

== Court structure ==
The building originally housed four superior courts, of Chancery, King's Bench, Exchequer and Common Pleas, giving the building its familiar name.

Under the Supreme Court of Judicature Act (Ireland) 1877, these four courts were replaced by two—the Court of Appeal, presided over by the Lord Chancellor, and the High Court of Justice, headed by the Lord Chief Justice—but the building has retained its historic name.

Under the Courts of Justice Act 1924, courts were established for the new Irish Free State with the Supreme Court of Justice, presided over by the Chief Justice, replacing the Court of Appeal and a reconstituted High Court of Justice, presided over by the President of the High Court, continuing the jurisdiction of the old High Court. The Constitution of Ireland in 1937 provided that courts would be established in a manner provided by the Constitution; this did not in fact occur until the implementation of the Courts (Establishment and Constitution) Act 1961. The Supreme Court and High Court (now dropping "of Justice" from their title) established under this act continued the jurisdiction of the courts established under the 1924 Act.

A new Court of Appeal was established in 2014, following a referendum in 2013, largely taking over the appellate jurisdiction of the Supreme Court and the old Court of Criminal Appeal. Its civil division sits in the Four Courts.

== History ==
Prior to the construction of a dedicated courts building at the beginning of the 17th century, the courts sat in various locations around the city but mainly at Dublin Castle. For a brief period in 1606, the courts moved across the river to their current location; however, they soon moved back to the southside due to pressure from Dublin Corporation.

=== St Michael's Hill structure ===
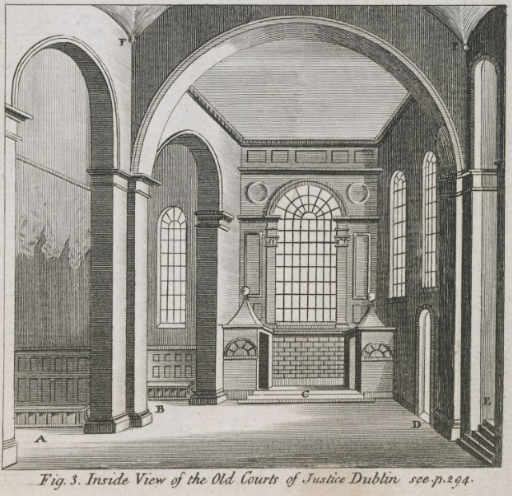
An illustration of the interior of the old four courts building on St Michael's Hill in 1788.

In 1608, a dedicated complex was built adjacent to Christ Church Cathedral, on what is today St Michael's Hill, which housed the four courts until opening of the present building around 1796.

Even after renovation and reconstruction works by William Robinson in 1695, there were constant complaints about the building's condition and location. Later works were supervised by Thomas Burgh from 1705-06 while Hugh Darley was also recorded as working as a stonecutter on the structure in 1749.

The Four Courts Marshalsea was originally also located nearby at that time between Winetavern Street and Fishamble Street. It later moved further east to an area around Bridgefoot Street and Thomas Street.

=== Gandon's building ===
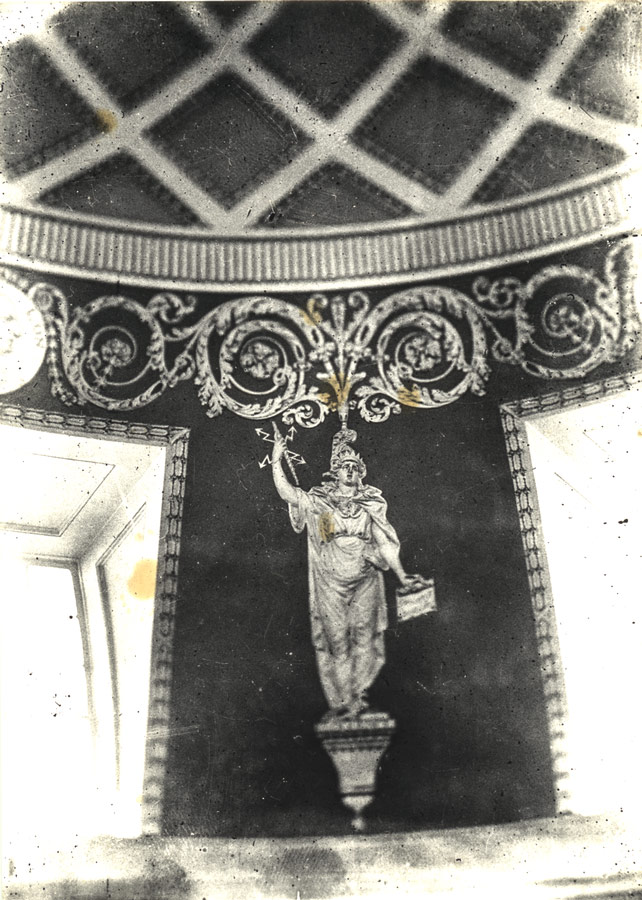
Part of the original Gandon-designed interior decoration of the dome, lost in the 1922 destruction

Work, based on the design of Thomas Cooley for the Public Records Office of Ireland, began in 1776. After Cooley died in 1784, renowned architect James Gandon was appointed to finish the buildings. It was built between 1786 and 1796, while the finishing touches to the arcades and wings were completed in 1802, The lands were previously used by the King's Inns. and before that a 13th-century Dominican Friary St. Saviour's was located on the site, confiscated following the dissolution of the monasteries by Henry VIII.

=== Easter Rising ===
The Four Courts and surrounding areas were held by Commandant Edward Daly's 1st Battalion during the Easter Rising in 1916. Some of the most intense fighting of Easter Week took place in the Church Street, North King Street and North Brunswick Street area. At the end of the week, the Four Courts building itself became the headquarters of the 1st Battalion.

=== Destruction in Civil War ===
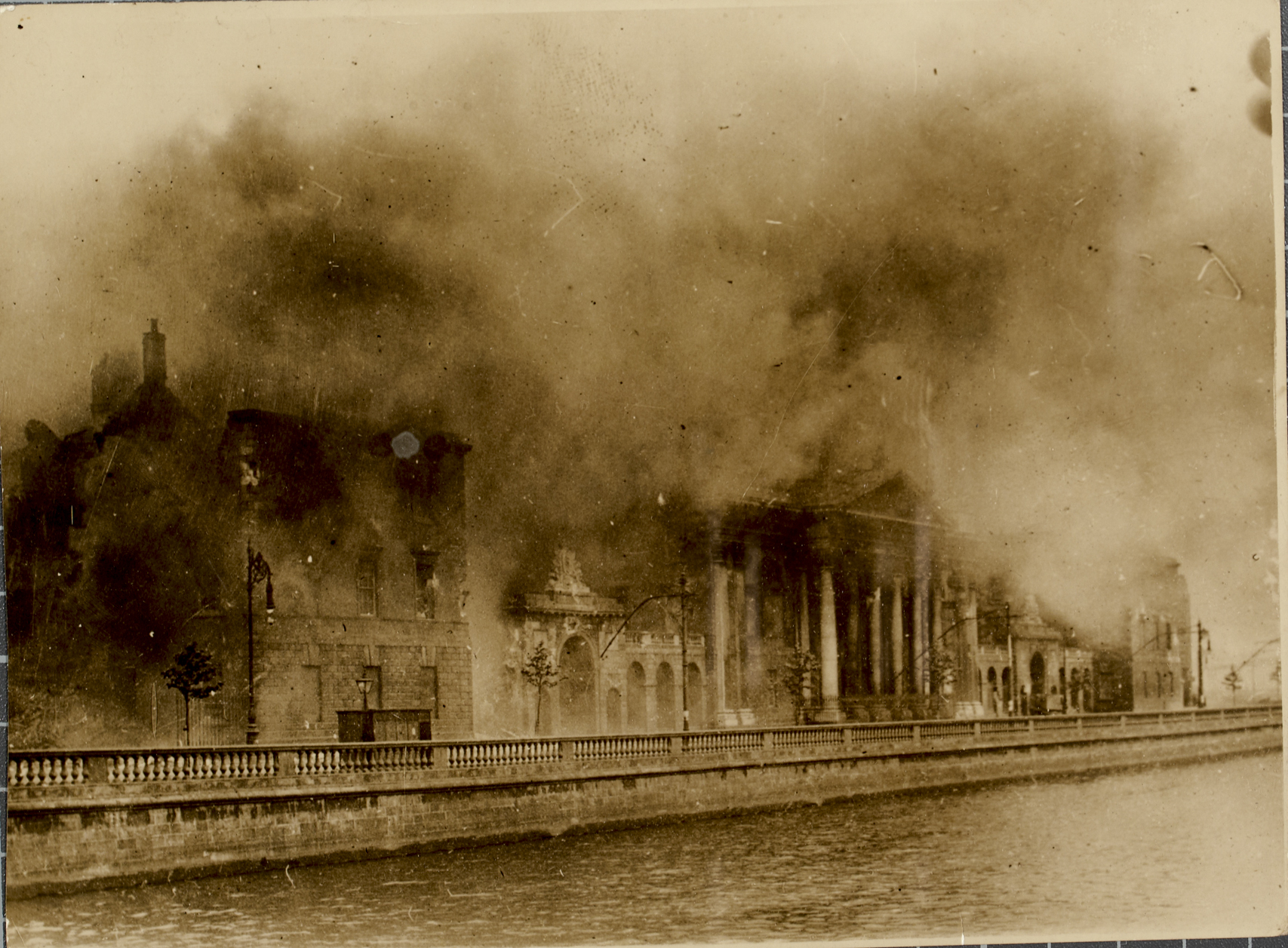
The Four Courts on fire during the Civil War

On 14 April 1922, the courts complex was occupied by IRA forces opposed to the Anglo-Irish Treaty, with Rory O'Connor acting as their spokesman. On 28 June the new National Army attacked the building to dislodge the "rebels", on the orders of the Minister for Defence Richard Mulcahy, authorised by President of Dáil Éireann Arthur Griffith. This attack provoked a week of fighting in Dublin. In the process of the bombardment, the historic building was destroyed. The west wing of the building was obliterated in a huge explosion, destroying the Irish Public Record Office at the rear of the building. Nearly a thousand years of archives were destroyed by this explosion, the ensuing fire, and the water poured onto the fire.

The IRA was accused of mining the records office; however, those present, who included future Taoiseach Seán Lemass, said that, while they had used the archive as a store of their ammunition, they had not deliberately mined it. They suggest that the explosion was caused by the accidental detonation of their ammunition store during the fighting.

=== Reopening in 1932 ===
For a decade after the destruction of the Civil War, the courts sat in the old viceregal apartments in Dublin Castle. In 1932, a rebuilt and remodelled Four Courts was opened. However, much of the decorative interior of the original building had been lost and, in the absence of documentary archives (some of which had been in the Public Records Office and others of which were among the vast amount of legal records lost also), and also because the new state did not have the funds, the highly decorative interior was not replaced.

=== Further development ===
The Office of Public Works added a modern two-storey extension to the roof of the old Public Records Office in the late 1960s. They also built River House on Chancery Street, overlooking the courts.

=== Criminal courts ===
Prior to 2010, both civil and criminal trials were heard in the Four Courts, which was also the location of the Court of Criminal Appeal. When the Criminal Courts of Justice building, near the Phoenix Park, opened in January 2010, all criminal trials were transferred there. The Four Courts remain in use for civil matters.

== Plans for Supreme Court building ==
There are plans to relocate the Supreme Court to a new purpose-built building near the Four Courts.

== Gallery ==
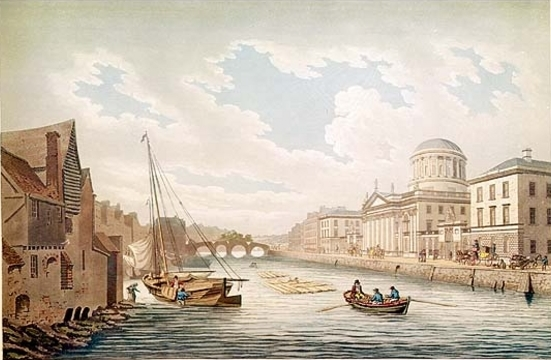
The Four Courts as painted by James Malton in 1799

Engraving by Thomas Ellis Owen, after W. H. Bartlett, 1837

Painting by Alphonse Dousseau in the 1800s

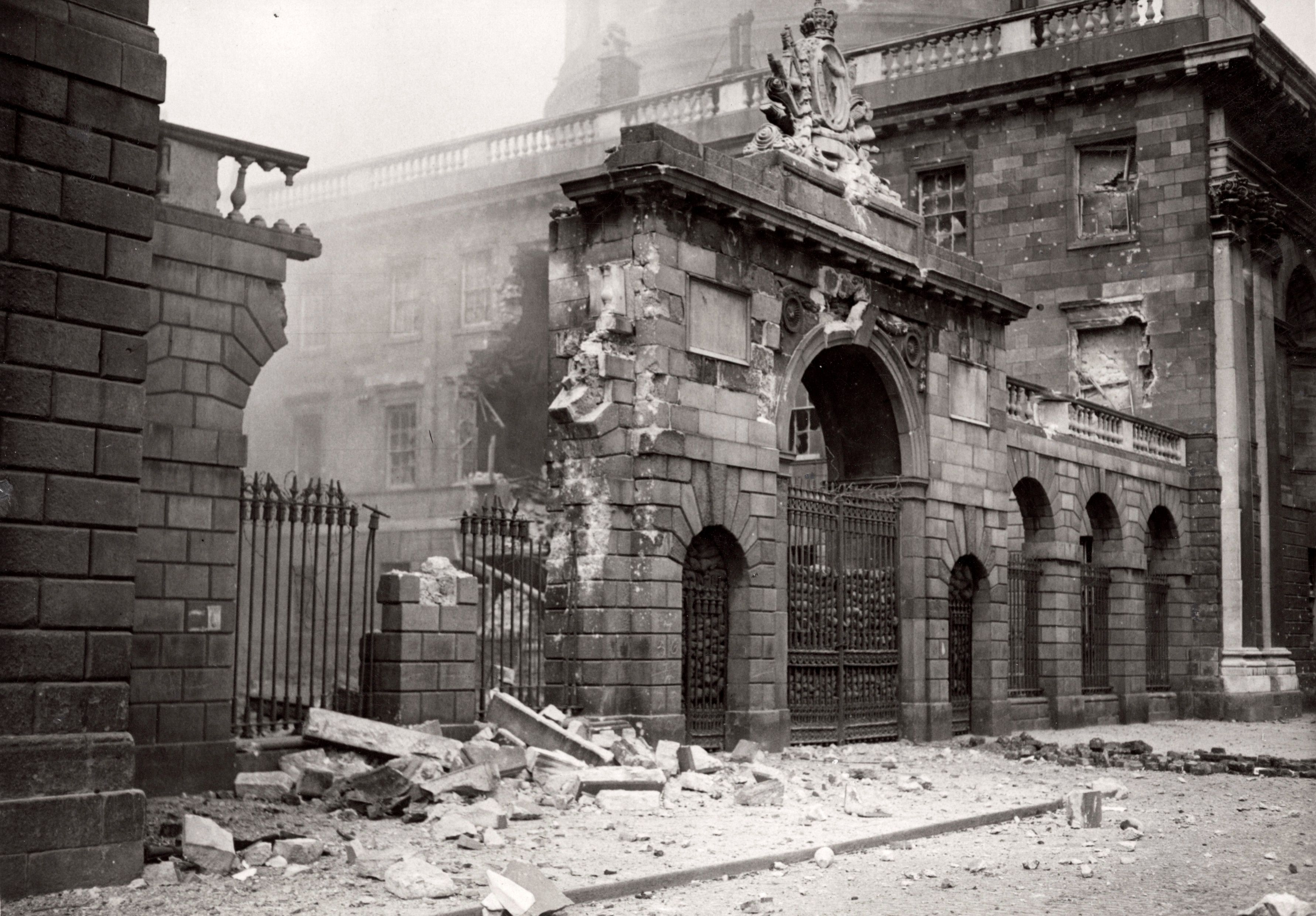
Damage inflicted on the building in 1922 during the Irish Civil War

A woman crossing O'Donovan Rossa Bridge next to the building in 1982

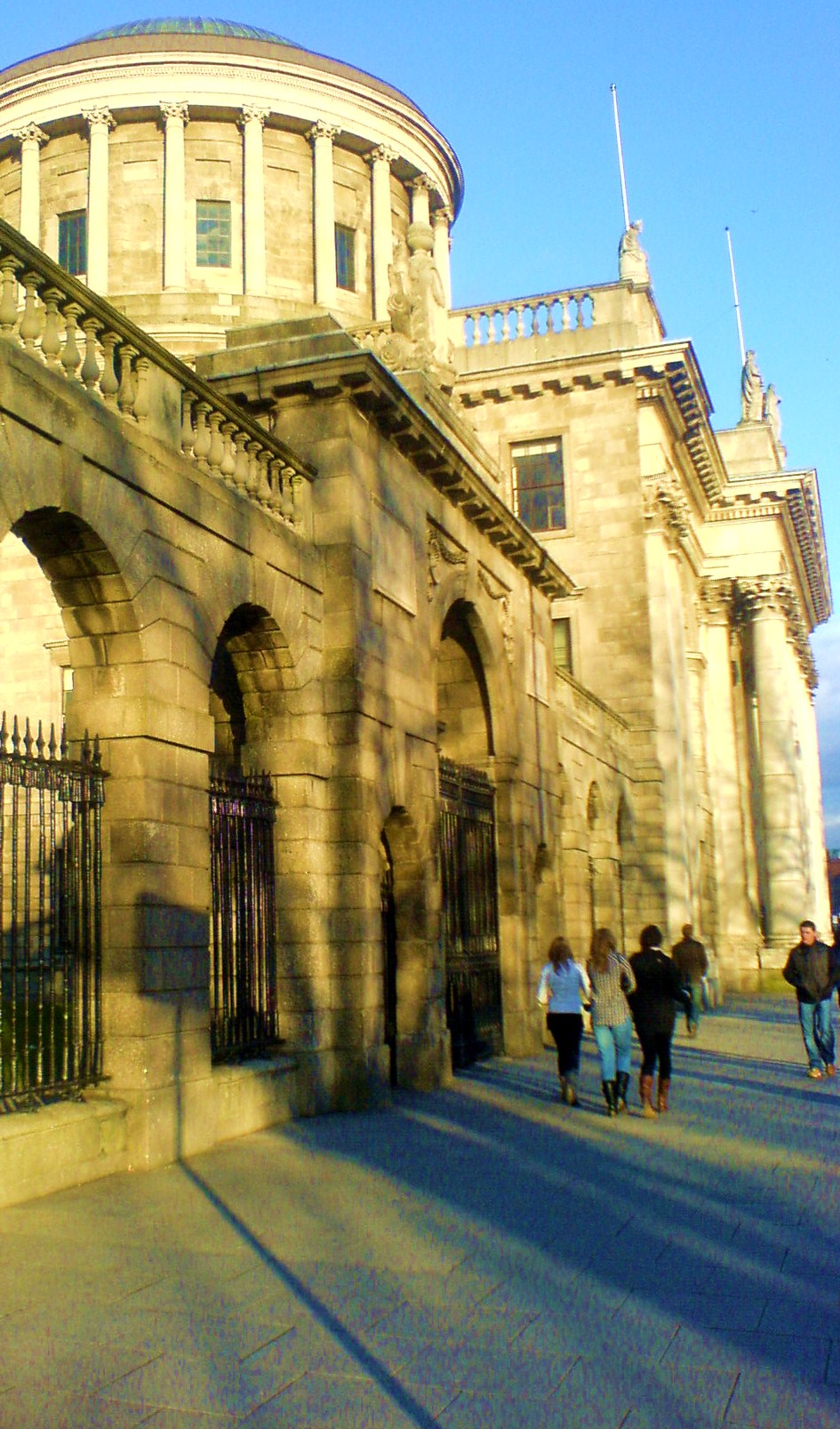
The Four Courts at Inns Quay

== See also ==
- Courts of the Republic of Ireland
- Law of the Republic of Ireland
- 18th-century Western domes
