= Grace v An Bórd Pleanála =

Irish Supreme Court case

Grace and anor v An Bord Pleanala
- Coat of arms of Ireland
- Court: Supreme Court of Ireland
- Decided: 24 February 2017
- Citation: [2017] IESC 10

Court membership
- Judges sitting: Clarke J, O'Malley J, O'Donnell J, MacMenamin J, Laffoy J, Dunne J, Charleton J

Case opinions
- Legislation can only “regulate” but importantly cannot “exclude” an appeal to the Supreme Court
- Decision by: Clarke J and O'Malley J.

Keywords
- Constitution; Environmental Law; European Union Law; Standing

Grace and anor v An Bórd Pleanála & ors[2017] IESC 10 is an Irish Supreme Court case in which the Court clarified the criteria for ''standing'' (sufficient connection to support participation in a case) in relation to judicial review of environmental concerns.

== Background ==
In 2014, An Bórd Pleanála (the respondent in the appeal) was granted planning permission for a wind farm in County Tipperary. Ms. Grace and Mr. Sweetman (the appellants in the appeal) objected to the development of a wind farm in an area known to be a habitat of hen harriers, a species protected under European Union law. The appellants applied to the High Court for an order of certiorari (court process to seek judicial review) quashing that decision on grounds that the respondent failed to carry out an adequate environmental impact assessment as required by the Habitats Directive and the Planning and Development Act 2000 (the 2000 Act).

The central question before the court was whether the Irish rules relating to "standing in environmental matters" had to be revised in light of recent jurisprudence from the Court of Justice of the European Union (CJEU).

== Holding of the High Court ==
The High Court held that the appellants did not have standing to challenge the respondent’s decision and that the Environmental Impact Assessment was adequate. The appellants applied to the High Court for a certificate, so as to appeal the decision on "standing" before the Court of Appeal and to make reference to the European Court of Justice, on whether the assessment was adequate. The High Court refused both applications.

The appellants applied for leave to appeal to the Supreme Court directly from the High Court on the basis of Article 34.5.4 of the Irish Constitution. Such direct appeals are referred to as "leapfrog appeals" Leave to appeal was granted.

== Holding of the Supreme Court ==
A joint written judgment was delivered by Clarke J and O'Malley J, with whom the rest of the Supreme Court concurred.

In the Supreme Court, the appellants sought three reliefs:

“(a) Whether the jurisprudence of this Court on the question of standing in environmental matters requires to be revised in the light of recent judgments of the Court of Justice and, if so, the application of any such revised jurisprudence to the facts of this case;

(b) Whether the jurisprudence of this Court concerning the absence of an entitlement to appeal against a refusal of leave to appeal by the High Court in environmental matters requires to be revised in the light of the new constitutional architecture consequent on the adoption of the 33rd Amendment and the jurisprudence of the ECJ and, if so, the application of such revised jurisprudence to the facts of this case; and

(c) Should it prove both appropriate and necessary in the light of the finding of the Court on issues (a) and (b) whether a substantive appeal against the decision of the High Court should be allowed by this Court on either or both of the grounds in respect of which the applicants sought leave to appeal before the High Court.”

The court noted that following the 33rd Amendment to the Irish Constitution, the "ordinary right of appeal from the High Court ... became a right to appeal to the Court of Appeal". However, Article 34.5.4 of the Irish Constitution also provides for leapfrog appeals directly to the Supreme Court from the High Court. The court went on to note that legislation (such as the 2000 Act) that precluded an appeal to the Supreme Court without a certificate of the High Court "can only “regulate” but importantly cannot “exclude” an appeal to this Court." Under the new scheme under Article 34.5.4 of the Irish Constitution, leave to appeal directly to the Supreme Court without a certificate can be granted if the court is "satisfied that a general issue of public importance arises or that the interests of justice require an appeal to this Court." The court went on to note that

"any measure which prevents (rather than regulates) the exercise by this Court of its entitlement, under the 33rd Amendment, to consider whether a case meets that constitutional threshold must be considered to be an impermissible exclusion of the right of appeal to this Court. No express relevant measure has been introduced since the 33rd Amendment. Precisely what form of measure might be considered an exclusion rather than a regulation does not, therefore, fall for consideration in this case."

The Supreme Court held that the appellants was entitled to appeal to the Supreme Court after successfully persuading the court that they satisfied the criteria mentioned above. Nevertheless, the court also noted that if there is a possibility for an appeal to the Court of Appeal instead of the Supreme Court, the former must be chosen. If a party wishes to argue that a leave to appeal was incorrectly refused by a High Court, then they can invite the Supreme Court to determine whether the constitutional threshold has been met or not. High Court judges when looking at such cases should keep in mind the new regime as per Article 34.5.4, but also remember that the Court of Appeal is still the normal route for appeals from the High Court.

The Supreme Court then went on to consider the point with respect to standing. The court noted that standing to bring challenges to environmental issues such as those in the case raises questions about standing under national and European Union law (as per Article 11 of the Directive 2011/92/EU). Article 11 confers on people, an entitlement to "question the procedural or substantive validity of certain decisions made in the environmental field." As a result, the court went on to note that "[t]here is no dispute but that the decision to grant permission in respect of the wind farm which is subject to challenge in these proceedings comes within the ambit of the type of decision which is subject to the provisions of Article 11."

In assessing standing under Article 11, courts should look at whether the person(s) bringing the challenge falls within two categories - "sufficient interest" or "maintaining the impairment of a right, where administrative procedural law of a Member State requires this as a precondition". The latter had never been a requirement in Ireland and so the court concluded that it would be more appropriate to analyse this case in light of whether the appellants had established that they have a sufficient interest in the project or not. The general principle to assess if a person has standing is by establishing that if the environmental project in question goes ahead, the person bringing the challenging will be adversely affected as there is "personal prejudice or injury to the interests of individual objectors".

The appellants in this case did not participate in the planning board for the proposed wind farms. However, this cannot automatically render their standing as invalid. Standing issues in Ireland are given a reasonably liberal approach by taking into consideration that depending on how large scale a project is and how much it interferes with a person's surroundings, the level of interest of that person in objecting to the development can vary. So, the scale of the project and its proximity to a challenger is important. Persons can also have standing if their objective is to safeguard nature or a particular amenity of the area. So standing in Irish environmental cases is generally assessed by taking into account whether the development will significantly affect a particular amenity or interests of the challenger. When required, given the facts of a case, courts should also have regard to the legitimate interests of the challenger in pursuing the application. The Supreme Court took special note of the fact that the place where this development is proposed to take place is protected by European Union law.

The Supreme Court ruled that Ms Grace did have standing even though she did not participate in the decision-making or planning process of the wind farm. Her counsel explained that this was the case because she was not aware of the plan until after the permission was granted. Also, she lives less than one kilometre away from the proposed development and she had been active in a number of environmentally focused groups. By taking into account the location of this development and the possible effects of it going ahead, the Supreme Court found Grace to have the necessary standing. The Supreme Court went on to note that it did not consider it necessary, in the circumstances, to reach a conclusion on Mr. Sweetman's standing.

With respect to the leapfrogging appeal, the Supreme Court concluded that it was not necessary to consider this point as appellant has "an independent possibility of appealing directly to this Court under Article 34.5.4" of the Irish Constitution.

Finally, the Supreme Court referred certain issues of European Union Law to the Court of Justice of the European Union.
