= George Birmingham =

Irish judge and former politician (born 1954)

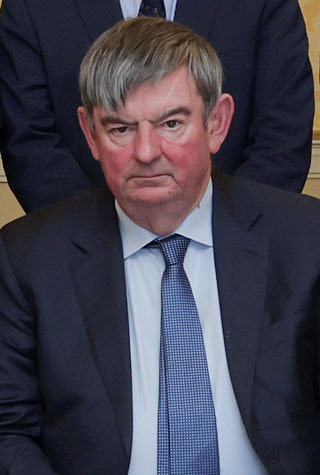
- Birmingham in 2024

President of the Court of Appeal
- In office 4 April 2018 – 24 July 2024
- Nominated by: Government of Ireland
- Appointed by: Michael D. Higgins
- Preceded by: Sean Ryan
- Succeeded by: Caroline Costello

Judge of the Court of Appeal
- In office 24 October 2014 – 24 July 2024
- Nominated by: Government of Ireland
- Appointed by: Michael D. Higgins

Judge of the High Court
- In office 5 June 2007 – 24 October 2014
- Nominated by: Government of Ireland
- Appointed by: Mary McAleese

Minister of State
- 1986–1987: European Affairs
- 1983–1986: Education
- 1982–1986: Labour

Teachta Dála
- In office June 1981 – June 1989
- Constituency: Dublin North-Central

Personal details
- Born: 3 August 1954 (age 72) Clontarf, Dublin, Ireland
- Party: Fine Gael
- Education: Trinity College Dublin; King's Inns

George Martin Birmingham (born 3 August 1954) is a retired Irish judge who served as President of the Court of Appeal from 2018 to 2024, a Judge of the Court of Appeal from 2014, and a Judge of the High Court from 2007 to 2014. He also served as a Teachta Dála (TD) for the Dublin North-Central constituency from 1981 to 1989 and as a Minister of State from 1982 to 1987.

== Early life ==
Birmingham was born in Dublin in 1954. He was educated at St Paul's College, Raheny, Trinity College Dublin and King's Inns, where he qualified as a barrister. He was called to the bar in November 1976.

His early legal career involved representing clients in commercial, criminal, and labour law matters.

== Political career ==
=== First elections ===
Birmingham was elected to the national executive of Fine Gael in December 1976. He proposed a successful motion at the 1978 Fine Gael Ardfheis for the party to seek a referendum on divorce. He was first elected to office at the 1979 Dublin Corporation election, topping the poll in the Raheny ward. He was first elected to Dáil Éireann at the 1981 general election as a Fine Gael TD for the Dublin North-Central constituency. He was competing against Charles Haughey, Vincent Brady and Noël Browne. He was the Fine Gael spokesperson for urban affairs in 1982.

=== Minister of State ===
Between 1982 and 1987, he served as a Minister of State under Taoiseach Garret FitzGerald. In December 1982 he was appointed as Minister of State at the Department of Labour with responsibility for youth affairs, with additional duties as Minister of State at the Department of Education with responsibility for Co-ordination of Education and Training from December 1983.

In 1983, in the Dáil, he defended the wording of the proposed Eighth Amendment of the Constitution of Ireland on behalf of the government, specifically to ensure that the Supreme Court of Ireland could not discover an unenumerated right to abortion.

In February 1986, he was appointed as Minister of State at the Department of Foreign Affairs with special responsibility for European Affairs and Development cooperation. He was succeeded as Minister of State for Youth Affairs by Enda Kenny. The government had considered creating a cabinet-level rank of Minister for European Affairs for Gemma Hussey to coordinate EEC affairs, but instead opted to appoint Birmingham to a Minister of State position, becoming the first Minister of State for European Affairs. Some EEC business was delegated by the Minister for Foreign Affairs to Birmingham. In the course of a visit to Irish aid projects in priority countries for Irish aid, Lesotho, Zambia, Tanzania, and Lusaka, he met with representatives of the ANC, the first Irish Minister to do so

=== Return to opposition ===
At the 1987 general election, Birmingham was re-elected to the Dáil despite he and constituency colleague Richard Bruton together polling only achieving 24% of the vote combined. Fine Gael lost office, and Birmingham was appointed party spokesperson for Labour by Alan Dukes in 1987 and subsequently Education in 1988. He proposed that injunctions restraining strikes should be not be held ex parte and that unofficial strikes should be banned. In March 1988, he introduced the Statute of Limitations (Amendment) Bill 1988, an unsuccessful private members' bill, into the Dáil, to change the time limits for personal injuries.

Birmingham lost his Dáil seat at the 1989 general election.

== Legal career ==
He resumed his career as a barrister in 1989, becoming a senior counsel in 1999. He practised extensively in criminal law, prosecuting on behalf of the Director of Public Prosecutions. He represented injured fans about the Lansdowne Road football riot. He appeared for the DPP in the trials of Michael McKevitt in the Special Criminal Court in 2003 and Linda and Charlotte Mulhall in 2006.

He served as chairperson of the Censorship of Publications Appeals Board. He was appointed to chair the Advisory Group on Criminal Law and Procedure in 1996 by Minister for Justice Nora Owen.

Birmingham was the sole member of the Commission of Investigation into the Dean Lyons case. He conducted a preliminary investigation for the government before the Ferns Report into allegations of clerical sex abuse in the Roman Catholic Diocese of Ferns.

== Judicial career ==
On 3 May 2007, it was announced that he had been selected to become a High Court judge. He became a Judge of the High Court in June 2007.

In October 2014, he became one of the first appointees as Judge of the Court of Appeal on its establishment. George Birmingham served as the Irish representative on Consultative Council of Judiciary (CCJE) and was elected to the Bureau, the leadership group of that body. He is a former president of the Association of Judges of Ireland (AJI)

=== President of Court of Appeal ===
On 24 April 2018, the Government of Ireland nominated Birmingham to be President of the Court of Appeal. As President of the Court of Appeal, he is an ex officio member of the Supreme Court.

Birmingham's nomination attracted political controversy, in light of his time as a Fine Gael TD and Minister of State during the 1980s.

In 2018, he noted the difficulty posed to the court in not having enough judges to hear appeals. There was a change in legislation in 2019 to increase the number of judges to speed up the appellate process, increasing the number of Court of Appeal judges to fifteen.

Birmingham retired from his judicial role in July 2024. In October it was announced that from December he would become the Independent Examiner of Security Legislation.

Dáil	Election	Deputy (Party)	Deputy (Party)	Deputy (Party)	Deputy (Party)
13th	1948	Vivion de Valera (FF)	Martin O'Sullivan (Lab)	Patrick McGilligan (FG)	3 seats 1948–1961
14th	1951	Vivion de Valera (FF)	Colm Gallagher (FF)	Patrick McGilligan (FG)	3 seats 1948–1961
15th	1954	Vivion de Valera (FF)	Maureen O'Carroll (Lab)	Patrick McGilligan (FG)	3 seats 1948–1961
16th	1957	Vivion de Valera (FF)	Colm Gallagher (FF)	Patrick McGilligan (FG)	3 seats 1948–1961
16th	1957 by-election	Vivion de Valera (FF)	Frank Sherwin (Ind.)	Patrick McGilligan (FG)	3 seats 1948–1961
17th	1961	Vivion de Valera (FF)	Frank Sherwin (Ind.)	Patrick McGilligan (FG)	Celia Lynch (FF)
18th	1965	Vivion de Valera (FF)	Michael O'Leary (Lab)	Luke Belton (FG)	Celia Lynch (FF)
19th	1969	George Colley (FF)	Michael O'Leary (Lab)	Luke Belton (FG)	Celia Lynch (FF)
20th	1973	George Colley (FF)	Michael O'Leary (Lab)	Luke Belton (FG)	Celia Lynch (FF)
21st	1977	Vincent Brady (FF)	Michael O'Leary (Lab)	Michael Keating (FG)	3 seats 1977–1981
22nd	1981	Vincent Brady (FF)	Charles Haughey (FF)	Noël Browne (SLP)	George Birmingham (FG)
23rd	1982 (Feb)	Vincent Brady (FF)	Charles Haughey (FF)	Richard Bruton (FG)	George Birmingham (FG)
24th	1982 (Nov)	Vincent Brady (FF)	Charles Haughey (FF)	Richard Bruton (FG)	George Birmingham (FG)
25th	1987	Vincent Brady (FF)	Charles Haughey (FF)	Richard Bruton (FG)	George Birmingham (FG)
26th	1989	Vincent Brady (FF)	Charles Haughey (FF)	Richard Bruton (FG)	Ivor Callely (FF)
27th	1992	Seán Haughey (FF)	Derek McDowell (Lab)	Richard Bruton (FG)	Ivor Callely (FF)
28th	1997	Seán Haughey (FF)	Derek McDowell (Lab)	Richard Bruton (FG)	Ivor Callely (FF)
29th	2002	Seán Haughey (FF)	Finian McGrath (Ind.)	Richard Bruton (FG)	Ivor Callely (FF)
30th	2007	Seán Haughey (FF)	Finian McGrath (Ind.)	Richard Bruton (FG)	3 seats from 2007
31st	2011	Aodhán Ó Ríordáin (Lab)	Finian McGrath (Ind.)	Richard Bruton (FG)	3 seats from 2007
32nd	2016	Constituency abolished. See Dublin Bay North			
