= Nuala Butler =

Irish barrister, Judge since 2020

The Hon. Ms. Justice Nuala Butler

Judge of the Court of Appeal
- Incumbent
- Assumed office 17 October 2022
- Nominated by: Government of Ireland
- Appointed by: Michael D. Higgins

Judge of the High Court
- In office 8 October 2020 – 17 October 2022
- Nominated by: Government of Ireland
- Appointed by: Michael D. Higgins

Personal details
- Education: University College Dublin; King's Inns

Nuala Butler is an Irish judge who has served as a Judge of the Court of Appeal since October 2022. She previously served as a Judge of the High Court from 2020 to 2022.

== Early life ==
Butler was educated at Mount Anville Secondary School, followed by University College Dublin, from where she graduated with a BCL degree in 1984 and an LL.M. degree in 1989. She obtained a BL degree from the King's Inns.

== Legal career ==
She qualified as a barrister and was called to the Bar in 1986, becoming a senior counsel in 2003. She practised on the Dublin and Eastern circuits.

Butler frequently appeared in matters involving judicial review and planning and environmental law on behalf of the government, An Bord Pleanála and other public bodies. She was appointed by the Supreme Court of Ireland to argue against the constitutionality of part of the Planning and Development Bill 1999 (with Paul Gallagher and James Connolly) in a reference made by President Mary McAleese under Article 26 of the Constitution. She further practiced in areas of law including defamation law, constitutional law, child law, election law, and asylum law.

She appeared in several tribunals of inquiry during her career. She represented the public interest at the McCracken Tribunal, the Attorney General of Ireland at the Smithwick Tribunal and the Garda Síochána at the Morris Tribunal. She acted as legal adviser to an Oireachtas committee on the content of the Thirty-sixth Amendment of the Constitution of Ireland.

Outside of her practice as a barrister, she was a member of the Employment Appeals Tribunal between 1989 and 1992 and was chairperson of the Mining Board from 1999 to 2002. Between 2016 and 2019, she chaired the Incorporated Council for Law reporting in Ireland.

== Judicial career ==
=== High Court ===
Butler was appointed a judge of the High Court in October 2020. Her appointment followed a vacancy created by the appointment of Teresa Pilkington to the Court of Appeal.

She has heard cases involving insolvency law, probate law, employment law, breach of privacy, judicial review and injunctions. In September 2021, she held in an action taken by Patrick Costello that ratifying the Comprehensive Economic and Trade Agreement would not be contrary to the Irish constitution.

=== Court of Appeal ===
Butler was nominated to replace David Barniville on the Court of Appeal in July 2022. Her appointment led to the Court of Appeal being the first court in Irish history to have a majority of women. She was appointed in October 2022.
