= Brian Murray =

Brian Murray may refer to:

- Brian Murray (actor) (1937–2018), South African actor and director
- Brian Murray (governor) (1921–1991), Governor of Victoria, Deputy Chief of the Royal Australian Navy
- Brian Murray (Gaelic footballer), Donegal player
- Brian Murray (hurler) (born 1984), Limerick player
- Brian Murray (judge), Irish judge and former barrister
- Brian Murray (politician), American state legislator in the Massachusetts House of Representatives.

== See also ==
- Brian Doyle-Murray (born 1945), actor
- Bryan Murray (disambiguation)
