= Patrick McCarthy (judge) =

Judge of the Irish Court of Appeal

The Hon. Mr. Justice Patrick McCarthy

Judge of the Court of Appeal
- Incumbent
- Assumed office 27 July 2018
- Nominated by: Government of Ireland
- Appointed by: Michael D. Higgins

Judge of the High Court
- In office 21 May 2007 – 26 July 2018
- Nominated by: Government of Ireland
- Appointed by: Mary McAleese

Personal details
- Born: Patrick James McCarthy Cork, Ireland
- Education: University College Cork; King's Inns

Patrick James McCarthy is an Irish judge who has served as a Judge of the Court of Appeal since July 2018. He previously served as a Judge of the High Court from 2007 to 2018.

McCarthy obtained a BCL degree from University College Cork and attended the King's Inns. He became a barrister in 1982 and became a senior counsel in 2000. His practice was focused on the Cork circuit. He frequently acted as prosecuting counsel for the Director of Public Prosecutions in criminal trials. He was also a member of the bars of England, Wales, and Northern Ireland. He was appointed to the Criminal Law Codification Advisory Committee in 2006, to advise on codification of Irish criminal law.

He was appointed to the High Court in May 2007, where he was assigned to the Central Criminal Court. During his term he was critical of proposed government changes to the selection of judicial appointments.

McCarthy became a Judge of the Court of Appeal in July 2018. His appointment was to fill the vacancy on the court left by Judge Alan Mahon.
