= Úna Ní Raifeartaigh =

Irish judge and lawyer

The Hon. Ms. Justice Úna Ní Raifeartaigh

Judge of the European Court of Human Rights
- Incumbent
- Assumed office 2 July 2024
- Nominated by: Government of Ireland
- Appointed by: Council of Europe

Judge of the Court of Appeal
- In office 4 November 2019 – 1 July 2024
- Nominated by: Government of Ireland
- Appointed by: Michael D. Higgins

Judge of the High Court
- In office 13 September 2016 – 4 November 2019
- Nominated by: Government of Ireland
- Appointed by: Michael D. Higgins

Personal details
- Relations: Lochlainn O'Raifeartaigh (father); Cormac O'Raifeartaigh (brother)
- Education: University College Dublin; King's Inns

Úna Ní Raifeartaigh is an Irish judge and lawyer who has served as a Judge of the European Court of Human Rights since July 2024. She previously served as a Judge of the Court of Appeal from 2019 to 2024 and a Judge of the High Court from 2016 to 2019.

Before her elevation to judicial office, she practised as a senior counsel and she was also a legal academic. Her academic and legal expertise is in criminal law and the law of evidence.

== Early life ==
Ní Raifeartaigh was born to Lochlainn O'Raifeartaigh and Treasa Donnelly. She attended University College Dublin and the King's Inns, graduating from UCD with a BCL degree in 1988. She was a research assistant at the Law Reform Commission from 1988 to 1991. She held the position of Reid Professor of Criminal Law at Trinity College Dublin from 1991 to 1995, a position formerly held by Mary McAleese and Mary Robinson.

== Legal career ==
She became a barrister in 1993 and a senior counsel in 2009. Her practice mostly focused on criminal law. She frequently appeared for the Director of Public Prosecutions in prosecuting cases on behalf of the State and was the highest paid barrister for the State in 2015. She was prosecution counsel in cases against Seán FitzPatrick relating to Anglo Irish Bank, Sharon Collins in hiring a hitman to kill her partner, Mark Nash regarding the Grangegorman killings, and Linda and Charlotte Mulhall, She was also involved in prosecutions in the Special Criminal Court, including a trial related to the Omagh bombing. She worked with Kevin Feeney to collect evidence, examine witnesses and present evidence on behalf of the Joint Oireachtas Committee investigating Brian Curtin.

She has also appeared as defence counsel in criminal trials. She represented a religious order at the Commission to Inquire into Child Abuse. She has argued before the European Court of Human Rights.

She is a former director of the Irish Council for Civil Liberties and chairperson of the Private Securities Services Appeal Board.

She has co-authored books on the law of evidence in Ireland and the Special Criminal Court. She is the founder of the Criminal Law Forum.

== Judicial career ==
Ní Raifeartaigh was appointed to the High Court in September 2016. She has heard cases involving matters relating to criminal law, constitutional law, road traffic offences, judicial review, extradition, bail, and land law.

She was the presiding judge in a case brought by Denis O'Brien in 2017 against the Oireachtas, following statements made in Dáil Éireann made by Pearse Doherty and Catherine Murphy regarding his financial affairs. The judge refused reliefs sought by O'Brien against the politicians, finding that there could be no judicial interference in regulating parliamentary privilege in the Irish legislature. She identified a constitutional protection of comments made during Dáil debates. Her judgment was upheld by a unanimous judgment of the Supreme Court delivered by Chief Justice Frank Clarke in March 2019.

She has served as an ad hoc judge for Ireland in the European Court of Human Rights.

She was elevated to the Court of Appeal in November 2019. Her appointment was one of six appointments due to expansion of the number of judges on the Court of Appeal following the enactment of the Courts Act 2019.

She is an adjunct professor at Maynooth University.
