= Paul Gilligan =

Paul Gilligan may refer to:

- Paul Gilligan (judge) (born 1948), Irish judge
- Paul Gilligan (cartoonist), Canadian creator of Pooch Café
