= Michael MacGrath =

Irish barrister, High Court judge since 2018

The Hon. Mr. Justice Michael MacGrath

Judge of the Court of Appeal
- Incumbent
- Assumed office 4 July 2024
- Nominated by: Government of Ireland
- Appointed by: Michael D. Higgins

Judge of the High Court
- In office 23 January 2018 – 4 July 2024
- Nominated by: Government of Ireland
- Appointed by: Michael D. Higgins

Personal details
- Education: University College Dublin; King's Inns

Michael MacGrath is an Irish judge who has served as a Judge of the Court of Appeal since July 2024. He previously served as a Judge of the High Court from 2018 to 2024.

== Early life ==
MacGrath attended University College Dublin from where he received BCL and LLM degrees. He subsequently attended the King's Inns.

== Legal career ==
He was called to the Bar in 1984 and became a senior counsel in 2000. His practice was predominantly focused on civil law and commercial law.

He was counsel for the Barr Tribunal and he represented the Attorney General of Ireland and the public interest at the Moriarty Tribunal.

In addition to his legal practice, he was the chairperson of the Broadcasting Complaints Commission between 2005 and 2009, and was the chair of the Mining Board from 2013.

MacGrath was a tutor in law at University College Dublin. He was the editor of a text on engineering law in 1989. He has acted as the external examiner for Tort law the King's Inns since 2009.

== Judicial career ==
MacGrath was appointed to the High Court in January 2018. He was appointment came following a vacancy created at the retirement of Judge Henry Abbott.

He has presided over cases involving commercial law, regulatory law, judicial review, employment law, and medical negligence.

In the midst of a judicial review hearing in 2019, a lay litigant unsuccessfully attempted to effect a citizen's arrest against him. In 2019, he decided against the Friends of the Irish Environment which sought to challenge governmental policy on climate change and reducing carbon emissions. The decision was appealed to the Supreme Court of Ireland with a hearing in June 2020.

He was elevated as a judge of the Court of Appeal in July 2024, and was appointed by President Michael D. Higgins.

In July 2025 MacGrath was appointed Chair of the Commission of Investigation into the Handling of Historical Child Sexual Abuse in Schools.
