= Maurice Collins (judge) =

Irish judge

The Hon. Mr. Justice Maurice Collins
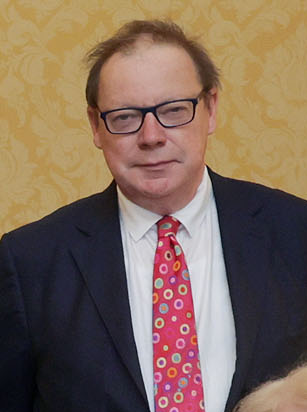
- Collins in 2024

Judge of the Supreme Court of Ireland
- Incumbent
- Assumed office 29 November 2022
- Nominated by: Government of Ireland
- Appointed by: Michael D. Higgins

Judge of the Court of Appeal
- In office 4 November 2019 – 29 November 2022
- Nominated by: Government of Ireland
- Appointed by: Michael D. Higgins

Personal details
- Born: Cork, Ireland
- Spouse: Nora Rice
- Relations: Michael Collins (Granduncle)
- Education: University College Cork; King's Inns

Maurice Gerard Collins is an Irish judge and lawyer who has served as a Judge of the Supreme Court of Ireland since November 2022. He previously served as a Judge of the Court of Appeal from 2019 to 2022.

== Early life ==
Collins is from Clonakilty in County Cork. He is the grandnephew of Michael Collins. He completed a BA in English Literature and Philosophy at University College Cork and later attended the King's Inns.

== Legal career ==
He was called to the Bar in 1989 and became a senior counsel in 2003. He is a former chair of the Incorporated Council for Law Reporting and became a bencher of the King's Inns in 2017.

Collins had a broad practice while at the bar. He frequently represented the State in public law matters. He appeared for the State in a challenge taken by Brian Mohan to the constitutionality of parliamentary gender quota legislation and an action initiated by Jolyon Maugham to try to prevent Brexit through the High Court.

His practice included commercial matters and disputes. He represented parties opposite Rory McIlroy and Dunnes Stores. He also appeared in actions involving medical negligence.

He appeared for Ireland in 2019 in the EU's General Court in appeal to the European Commission's decision arising from the EU illegal State aid case against Apple in Ireland.

== Judicial career ==
=== Court of Appeal ===
He became a Judge of the Court of Appeal in November 2019. His appointment arose out of a vacancy was created due to the retirement of Michael Peart.

=== Law Reform Commission ===
Collins was appointed to the Law Reform Commission as a part-time commissioner for a five-year term in October 2020.

=== Supreme Court ===
Collins was nominated and appointed to the Supreme Court of Ireland in November 2022.

== Personal life ==
He is married to Nora Rice. They are patrons of the National Gallery of Ireland.
