= Niamh Hyland =

Irish barrister, Justice of the Supreme Court since 2026

The Hon. Ms. Justice Niamh Hyland
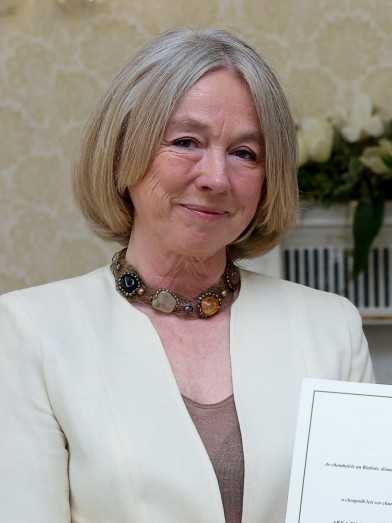
- Hyland in 2026

Judge of the Supreme Court of Ireland
- Incumbent
- Assumed office 22 April 2026
- Nominated by: Government of Ireland
- Appointed by: Catherine Connolly

Judge of the Court of Appeal
- In office 4 July 2024 – 22 April 2026
- Nominated by: Government of Ireland
- Appointed by: Michael D. Higgins

Judge of the High Court
- In office 2 December 2019 – 4 July 2024
- Nominated by: Government of Ireland
- Appointed by: Michael D. Higgins

Personal details
- Born: Niamh Margaret Hyland
- Spouse: Nick Kelly (m. 1997)
- Relations: John M. Kelly (father-in-law)
- Education: Trinity College, Dublin; Magdalen College, Oxford; King's Inns

Niamh Margaret Hyland is an Irish judge who has served as a Judge of the Supreme Court since April 2026. She previously served as a Judge of the Court of Appeal from 2024 to 2026 and a Judge of the High Court from 2019 to 2024.

== Education ==
Hyland received her secondary school education at Newpark Comprehensive School. She obtained an LL.B. degree from Trinity College, Dublin at the University of Dublin and was elected a Scholar of Trinity College in 1987. She achieved a BCL master's degree from the University of Oxford, attending Magdalen College. She later attended the King's Inns.

== Legal career ==
She began her career as the Jean Monnet Professor of European Union law at Trinity College Dublin. She then worked in Luxembourg as référendaire to Donal Barrington at the Court of First Instance. In 1996, she was appointed by the European Commission Representation in Ireland to provide legal advice on people's EU law rights.

She was called to the Bar in 1994 and commenced practice in 1996. She became a senior counsel in 2012. Her expertise was in aspects of EU and regulatory law, including public procurement, competition law, environmental law and sectoral specialisations in health, finance and telecommunications, and also advised on constitutional and administrative law. She has appeared before the European Court of Justice. Among clients she represented were Esat Telecom, AIG, IKEA, Vodafone, Facebook, Inc. and RTÉ.

In December 2010, she appeared with David Barniville for the Minister for Finance in the High Court regarding the nationalisation of Allied Irish Banks. She represented Michael Lowry in a challenge to his costs arising from the Moriarty Tribunal.

The Central Bank of Ireland employed Hyland as counsel in their inquiry into Irish Nationwide Building Society.

She lectured at legal conferences and delivered a paper to the Citizens' Assembly in January 2018 on referendums in Ireland.

Outside of her practice, she was a member of the Bar Council and served on boards including The Rehab Group and Open Spectrum CLG.

== Judicial career ==
Hyland was appointed to the High Court in December 2019. She has presided over cases involving data protection law, freedom of information law, environmental law, medical negligence, insolvency law, and company law.

She was part of a three-judge division of the High Court with the President of the High Court Mary Irvine, and Denis McDonald in June 2020. The lead plaintiff Ivana Bacik took action against the Taoiseach to ask the court if Seanad Éireann could sit without its nominated members. The three judges held that it could not.

She was elevated as a judge of the Court of Appeal in July 2024, having been appointed by President Michael D. Higgins.

She served as an Appeal Court judge until April 2026 when she was appointed a judge of the Supreme Court by President Catherine Connelly to fill the vacancy created by the retirement of judge Elizabeth Dunne.

== Personal life ==
She was born on 23 September 1966. She is married to singer, filmmaker and former member of The Fat Lady Sings Nick Kelly, who is the son of John M. Kelly.
