= Paul Gilligan (judge) =

Irish judge

Judge of the Court of Appeal
- In office 19 December 2017 – 16 May 2018
- Nominated by: Government of Ireland
- Appointed by: Michael D. Higgins

Judge of the High Court
- In office 22 January 2003 – 19 December 2017
- Nominated by: Government of Ireland
- Appointed by: Mary McAleese

Personal details
- Born: 1948 (age 77–78)
- Spouse: Mary Cantrell (m. 1980)
- Children: 4
- Education: University College Dublin; King's Inns

Paul Gilligan (born 1948) is a retired Irish judge who served as a Judge of the Court of Appeal from 2017 to 2018 and a Judge of the High Court from 2003 to 2017.

He was educated at Blackrock College. He then attended University College Dublin and the King's Inns. Gilligan became a barrister in 1971 and a senior counsel in 1984. He also qualified as mediator. He was a legal advisor to an inquiry into Deposit interest retention tax conducted by the Public Accounts Committee, along with future Supreme Court judges Frank Clarke and Mary Irvine. He represented Charles Haughey at the McCracken Tribunal.

Gilligan was appointed to the High Court in 2003. He managed the Chancery division of the court for several years. He oversaw proceedings related to the occupation and demolition of Apollo House, Dublin, and claims arising out of the Morris Tribunal.

He was a member of the Judicial Appointments Review Committee and served as President of the European Network of Councils for the Judiciary. He advised the judiciary of Bosnia-Herzegovina on the establishment of a judicial council.

He became a Judge of the Court of Appeal in December 2017. A vacancy arose following the appointment of Mary Finlay Geoghegan to the Supreme Court. He retired in May 2018.

He married Mary Cantrell, a solicitor, with whom he has four children.
