= Court of Criminal Appeal (Ireland) =

The Court of Criminal Appeal (Irish: An Chúirt Achomhairc Choiriúil) was an appellate court for criminal cases in the law of the Republic of Ireland. It existed from 1924 until 2014, when it was superseded by the Court of Appeal, which can hear appeals for all types of case.

== Operation ==
The Court of Criminal Appeal heard appeals for indictable offences tried in the Circuit Court, the Central Criminal Court, and the Special Criminal Court. The Court sat in a division of three, with one Supreme Court judge and two High Court judges.

The court could hear appeals by a defendant against conviction, sentence or both. Leave to appeal was only given where there was a disagreement on a point of law, although an exception can be made when new evidence becomes available which could not have been presented before the original court.

The Director of Public Prosecutions could also appeal against a sentence on the grounds that it was unduly lenient.

A further appeal to the Supreme Court only lay when the Court of Criminal Appeal itself or the Attorney General certified that a point of law of exceptional public importance needed to be resolved.

== History ==
=== Before independence ===
The Crown Cases Act 1848 (11 & 12 Vict. c. 78) established a Court for Crown Cases Reserved in each of England and Wales and Ireland. These courts were sometimes called the "Court of Criminal Appeal", but only heard point of law appeals. In England and Wales, a Court of Criminal Appeal was established in 1907, but in Ireland the 1848 court remained in operation.

A Court of Criminal Appeal was temporarily established during the Irish Land War by the Prevention of Crime (Ireland) Act, 1882. This comprised the judges of the Supreme Court of Judicature except for the Lord Chancellor of Ireland. The 1882 Act expired after three years.

=== After independence ===
The Courts of Justice Act 1924 established a new court system under the terms of the 1922 Constitution of the Irish Free State. These included a new Supreme Court and High Court, and a Court of Criminal Appeal comprising judges of those two courts. The courts were re-established in 1961 under the terms of the current (1937) Constitution. The Court of Criminal Appeal was replaced on 5 November 2014 by the Court of Appeal, as mandated by the 33rd Amendment of the Constitution passed in 2013. The Court of Appeal has taken on all hearings of the Court of Criminal Appeals and the Courts-Martial Appeal Court, as well as many backlogged Supreme Court cases.
