= Commission of Investigation into the Handling of Historical Child Sexual Abuse in Schools =

2025 Irish government commission

The Commission of Investigation into the Handling of Historical Child Sexual Abuse in Schools is a commission of investigation established by the Irish Government to investigate the handling by schools, the police and other authorities of concerns of historical child sexual abuse. Arising from the recommendations of the prior Scoping Inquiry into Historical Sexual Abuse in Day and Boarding Schools Run by Religious Orders, the commission was established by statutory instrument in 2025 and Mr Justice Michael MacGrath was appointed by its chair, with the commission becoming known as the MacGrath Commission.
