= Isobel Kennedy =

Irish judge of the Court of Appeal

The Hon. Ms. Justice Isobel Kennedy

Judge of the Court of Appeal
- Incumbent
- Assumed office 13 November 2018
- Nominated by: Government of Ireland
- Appointed by: Michael D. Higgins

Judge of the High Court
- In office 10 February 2015 – 13 November 2018
- Nominated by: Government of Ireland
- Appointed by: Michael D. Higgins

Chair of the Referendum Commission
- In office 29 March 2018 – 11 November 2018
- Appointed by: Eoghan Murphy

Personal details
- Born: Limerick, Ireland
- Education: University College Cork; King's Inns

Isobel Kennedy is an Irish judge who has served as a Judge of the Court of Appeal since November 2018. She previously served as a Judge of the High Court from 2015 to 2018 and Chairperson of the Referendum Commission from March 2018 to November 2018.

Kennedy is from Limerick. She obtained a BCL degree in 1986 from University College Cork and began practising as a barrister in 1988. She specialised in criminal and constitutional law. She served on the Barristers' Professional Conduct Tribunal of the Bar of Ireland and was a member of the Bar Council between 1995 and 1997. She became a senior counsel in 2003. Kennedy acted as a barrister for the Investigation Committee of the Commission to Inquire into Child Abuse.

She became a High Court judge in February 2015. She was nominated following a selection process by the Judicial Appointments Advisory Board. She acted as Judge on the Special Criminal Court until 2018.

Kennedy twice served as chairperson to the Referendum Commission, serving for the referendum to allow the Oireachtas to legislate for abortion and the referendum to remove blasphemy from the Constitution. The referendum on abortion had the highest voter turnout in a referendum since the establishment of the commission. Kennedy recommended in a report to the Oireachtas that the Commission be replaced with "a permanent Electoral Commission".

She became a Judge of the Court of Appeal in November 2018. Kennedy's appointment to the Court of Appeal at the same time as Caroline Costello led to the first Irish court with a gender-balanced number of judges.

She currently serves on the Advisory Committee to the School of Law at the University of Limerick.
