= Aileen Donnelly =

Irish Supreme Court judge

The Hon. Ms. Justice Aileen Donnelly
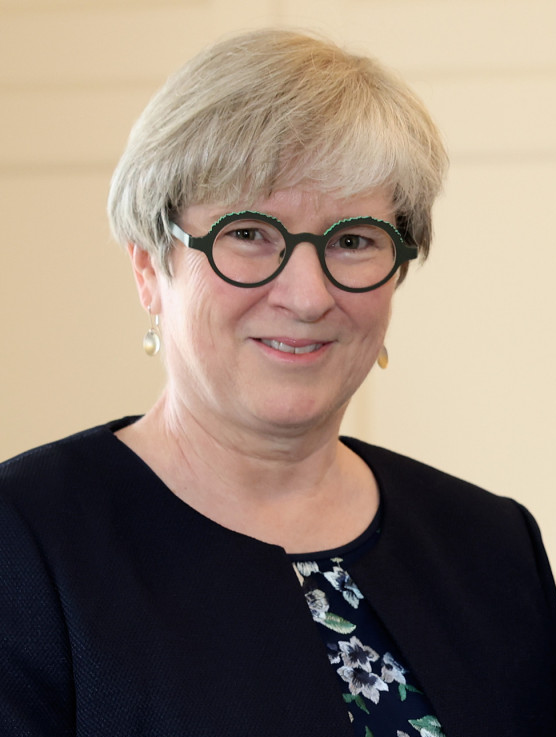
- Donnelly in 2023

Judge of the Supreme Court of Ireland
- Incumbent
- Assumed office 2 June 2023
- Nominated by: Government of Ireland
- Appointed by: Michael D. Higgins

Judge of the Court of Appeal
- In office 17 June 2019 – 2 June 2023
- Nominated by: Government of Ireland
- Appointed by: Michael D. Higgins

Judge of the High Court
- In office 22 September 2014 – 17 June 2019
- Nominated by: Government of Ireland
- Appointed by: Michael D. Higgins

Personal details
- Spouse: Susan Miner (m. 2016)
- Education: University College Dublin; King's Inns

Aileen Donnelly is an Irish judge who has served as a Judge of the Supreme Court of Ireland since June 2023. She previously served as a Judge of the Court of the Appeal from 2019 to 2023 and a Judge of the High Court from 2014 to 2019.

== Legal career ==
Donnelly attended University College Dublin, where she obtained a BCL degree in 1986 and a master's degree in equality studies in 1995. She also attended the King's Inns. In 1988, she was called to the Bar. Between 1996 and 2002, she was a board member and co-chair of the Irish Council for Civil Liberties (ICCL). She was counsel for a complainant in the Commission to Inquire into Child Abuse. In 2004, she was called to the Inner Bar. She has published legal texts on tax law, the law of the European Convention on Human Rights and gender and law.

== Judicial career ==
=== High Court ===
She was appointed a Judge of the High Court in September 2014. She was in charge of High Court extradition cases. Donnelly postponed an order of extradition for a man to Poland in 2018, as a result of the 2015 Polish Constitutional Court crisis. She referred the issue to the Court of Justice of the European Union. Her subsequent decision did not find that there was a specific threat to the accused man's rights to a fair trial. Donnelly's preliminary decision received substantial personal criticism from some Polish media publications, leading to Association of Judges of Ireland and the European Association of Judges writing statements of support for the judge.

=== Court of Appeal ===
Donnelly became a Judge of the Court of Appeal in June 2019. Her appointment followed the elevation of Mary Irvine to the Supreme Court of Ireland.

=== Supreme Court ===
The Irish Government nominated Donnelly for appointment to the Supreme Court of Ireland in May 2023. She was appointed in June 2023.

== Personal life ==
She is the first openly gay member of the High Court, the Court of Appeal and the Supreme Court. She is married to Susan Miner.
