= Brian O'Moore =

Irish barrister, Court of Appeal judge since 2023

The Hon. Mr. Justice Brian O'Moore
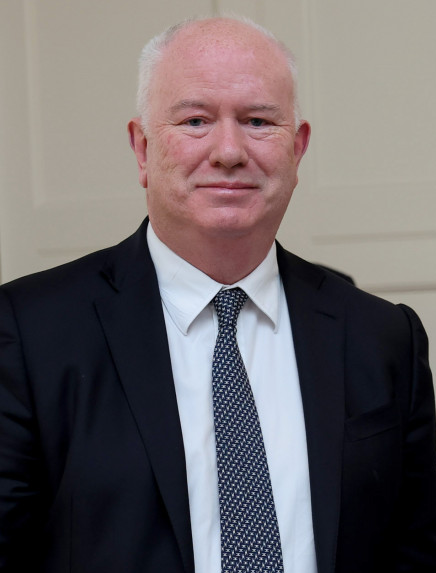
- O'Moore in 2026

Judge of the Supreme Court of Ireland
- Incumbent
- Assumed office 22 April 2026
- Nominated by: Government of Ireland
- Appointed by: Catherine Connolly

Judge of the Court of Appeal
- In office 23 October 2023 – 22 April 2026
- Nominated by: Government of Ireland
- Appointed by: Michael D. Higgins

Judge of the High Court
- In office 2 December 2019 – 23 October 2023
- Nominated by: Government of Ireland
- Appointed by: Michael D. Higgins

Personal details
- Born: Brian Gerard O’Moore
- Education: Trinity College Dublin; King's Inns

Brian Gerard O'Moore is an Irish judge and lawyer who has served as a Judge of the Supreme Court since April 2026. He has also served as President of the European Network of Councils for the Judiciary since June 2026.

O'Moore previously served as a Judge of the Court of Appeal from October 2023 to April 2026 and a Judge of the High Court from 2019 to 2023. Before being appointed to the bench, he practised as a barrister, where he was involved in many significant commercial law cases.

== Early life ==
O'Moore attended secondary school at St Mary's College, Dublin, completing his studies in 1978. He studied Legal Science at Trinity College Dublin, graduating in 1982, and trained to become a barrister at the King's Inns. He became a scholar of Trinity College in 1980.

== Legal career ==
He was called to the bar in 1984 and became a senior counsel fifteen years later in 1999. His practiced focused primarily on commercial law, appearing on issues involving corporate disputes, company law, employment law and intellectual property disputes. Jim Mansfield, Dunnes Stores, Quinn Group, the owners of the Shelbourne Hotel, Treasury Holdings, Comcast, Allied Irish Banks, and Declan Ganley were among his clients.

He represented Pat Kenny in a 2008 High Court case involving a dispute over land. He was a barrister for Larry Goodman and his investment firm Breccia in disputes with the Blackrock Clinic and the Galway Clinic.

Beyond the Irish courts, O'Moore has also appeared for the Irish government at the European Court of Justice, including in Metock v Minister for Justice, Equality and Law Reform.

The precipitation of the post-2008 Irish banking crisis led to many court disputes, with O'Moore appearing in many, including on matters of insolvency law and in cases on behalf of the National Asset Management Agency. He acted for Anglo Irish Bank in November 2009 when a group of New York investors accused the bank of fraud. In December 2009, he acted for the bank's former CEO David Drumm in an action the bank took seeking to recover unpaid loans. He also acted for the Sisk Group and Seán Quinn and his family in defending actions taken by Anglo Irish Bank. During the Quinn proceedings, a son and a nephew of Seán Quinn were jailed for putting assets beyond the reach of the court.

Beyond his commercial practice, he also represented clients in matters involving criminal law, immigration law, and defamation law. He was counsel for Mary Harney and The Irish Times in separate defamation cases. He appeared for James Gogarty at the Flood Tribunal in 1999. He acted for the Attorney General of Ireland to defend an attempt by a group of prisoners in Mountjoy Prison seeking release to vote in the first referendum on the Nice Treaty. and Office of the Director of Corporate Enforcement the other proceedings.

He was appointed the lead counsel for a Central Bank of Ireland inquiry into Irish Nationwide Building Society in 2017.

== Judicial career ==
=== High Court ===
O'Moore was appointed to the High Court in December 2019. He was a judge of the Commercial Court division of the High Court. He has presided over cases involving professional negligence, employment law, company law, insolvency law, judicial review, and injunctions.

=== Court of Appeal ===
O'Moore was appointed to the Court of Appeal in October 2023.

=== Supreme Court ===
In April 2026, O'Moore was appointed to the Supreme Court to fill the vacancy created by the retirement of judge Peter Charleton.
