= John Hedigan =

Irish judge (born 1948)

Judge of the Court of Appeal
- In office 20 July 2016 – 12 October 2018
- Nominated by: Government of Ireland
- Appointed by: Michael D. Higgins

Judge of the High Court
- In office 21 May 2007 – 2 September 2016
- Nominated by: Government of Ireland
- Appointed by: Mary McAleese

Judge of the European Court of Human Rights
- In office 10 November 1998 – 19 April 2007
- Nominated by: Government of Ireland
- Appointed by: Council of Europe

Personal details
- Born: 14 October 1948 (age 77) Dublin, Ireland
- Education: Trinity College Dublin; King's Inns

John Hedigan (born 14 October 1948) is a retired Irish judge who served as a Judge of the Court of Appeal from 2016 to 2018, a Judge of the High Court from 2007 to 2014 and a Judge of the European Court of Human Rights from 1998 to 2007. He is the current Chair of the Irish Banking Culture Board (IBCB).

== Early career ==
Hedigan was educated at Belvedere College, Trinity College Dublin and King's Inns. He was called to the Irish Bar in November 1976. He became a Senior Counsel in 1990.

He became a Bencher of the King's Inns in 2002. He was called to the English Bar in 1986 and to the Bar of New South Wales Australia in 1993.

== Judicial career ==
Hedigan chaired the Civil Service Disciplinary Appeals Tribunal from 1992 to 1994. Hedigan was appointed as a judge of the European Court of Human Rights in November 1998 and served until April 2007. He was subsequently appointed as a judge of the High Court in 2007 and served until his elevation to the new Court of Appeal on its creation in 2016.

He retired from the Court of Appeal in October 2018.
