= Lochlainn O'Raifeartaigh =

Irish physicist

Lochlainn O'Raifeartaigh (/ˈlɒxlɪn oʊˈræfərti/; 11 March 1933 – 18 November 2000) was an Irish physicist in the field of theoretical particle physics. He is best known for O'Raifeartaigh's no-go theorem, the O'Raifeartaigh Theorem, a result in unification theory, and the O'Raifeartaigh Model of supersymmetry breaking.

O'Raifeartaigh was born in Clontarf, Dublin in 1933, and attended St. Joseph's C.B.S. in Fairview and Castleknock College. Most of his scientific career was centred on that city, where he obtained his first degrees at University College Dublin (BA in 1953 and MSc in Mathematical Physics in 1956), and spent from 1968 until his death as Senior Professor at the Dublin Institute for Advanced Studies. He obtained his doctorate from the University of Zurich in 1960, under Walter Heitler. He also visited many institutions, notably Madras, IHES Bures, and the Institute for Advanced Study in Princeton, New Jersey, but it was during an extended stay at Syracuse University (1964-8) that he made the discovery that established his reputation. This result, which became known as O'Raifeartaigh's no-go theorem, showed that it was impossible to combine internal and relativistic symmetries other than in a trivial fashion, thus ending a widespread quest by the particle physics community to achieve this fusion. The O'Raifeartaigh theorem was later generalized to a result known as the Coleman–Mandula theorem.

O'Raifeartaigh's prolific career in theoretical physics was manifested by many fundamental contributions to the application of symmetries in particle physics. In the 1970s he showed that the new supersymmetries could provide a mechanism (O'Raifeartaigh's mechanism) for circumventing his no-go theorem which had assumed only classical Lie group symmetries. In the 1980s he applied non-Abelian gauge theory to the analysis of magnetic monopoles. His interests encompassed the spin-statistics theorem, Kac–Moody and W-algebras, and included early contributions to the theory of non-invariance (dynamical) groups, among much else. His long and productive career in the application of symmetry methods to theoretical physics was acknowledged by the award of the Wigner Medal in August 2000.

Lochlainn is the father of Cormac O'Raifeartaigh, an Irish physicist and of Úna Ní Raifeartaigh, an Irish lawyer who has been a Judge of the High Court and is currently serving as a Judge of the Court of Appeal.

== Notes ==
- O’Raifeartaigh, Lochlainn (1997). The Dawning of Gauge Theory (1st ed.). Princeton University Press. ISBN 0691029784.
