= Bryan Murray =

Bryan Murray may refer to:

- Bryan Murray (actor) (born 1949), Irish actor
- Bryan Murray (ice hockey) (1942–2017), Canadian ice hockey coach and executive

== See also ==
- Brian Murray (disambiguation)
