= Donald Binchy =

Irish judge

The Hon. Mr. Justice Donald Binchy

Judge of the Court of Appeal
- Incumbent
- Assumed office 18 March 2020
- Nominated by: Government of Ireland
- Appointed by: Michael D. Higgins

Judge of the High Court
- In office 30 October 2014 – 18 March 2020
- Nominated by: Government of Ireland
- Appointed by: Michael D. Higgins

Personal details
- Born: 1963 (age 62–63) Waterford, Ireland
- Spouse: Claire Cusack (m. 1999)
- Children: 3
- Education: University College Dublin; Law Society of Ireland

Donald Binchy (born 1963) is an Irish judge and lawyer who has served as a Judge of the Court of Appeal since March 2020. He previously served as a Judge of the High Court from 2014 to 2020. He formerly practiced as a solicitor, and was the President of the Law Society of Ireland between 2011 and 2012.

== Early life and education ==
Binchy was born in Waterford in 1963, but is from Clonmel in County Tipperary. His father Don, was a solicitor who was the President of the Law Society of Ireland from 1990 to 1991. He attended Clongowes Wood College and received a BCL degree from University College Dublin in 1984. He qualified as a solicitor from the Law Society in 1987 and spent two years practising at a commercial firm in Dublin, Cawley, Sheerin, Wynne, practising in the areas of funds and re-insurance law. He subsequently joined the firm founded by his grandfather, Binchy Solicitors, in Clonmel. He was appointed solicitor to Clonmel Corporation in 1995.

In his practice, he specialised in particular in aspects of company and commercial law, in addition to administrative law and planning law.

He became President of the Law Society of Ireland in 2011 to serve a term until 2012. He had previously served on various committees of the Law Society prior to becoming president.

== Judicial career ==
=== High Court ===
Binchy became a High Court judge in October 2014. He was the first solicitor from Clonmel to be appointed to the High Court.

In the bench in the High Court, he heard extradition cases including those arising out of the Essex lorry deaths and the death of Sophie Toscan du Plantier. He also heard applications for injunctions, and a commercial dispute involving Jedward.

In 2015, he granted an injunction against RTÉ taken by Denis O'Brien to prevent the broadcast of details of his personal banking arrangements contained in a news report. He subsequently held that what was said about O'Brien in Dáil Éireann was reportable.

=== Court of Appeal ===
He was elevated to the Court of Appeal in March 2020. A vacancy arose following the appointment of Marie Baker to the Supreme Court of Ireland.

== Personal life ==
He is married to Claire Cusack with whom he has three children.
