= Seamus Noonan =

Irish judge

The Hon. Mr. Justice Seamus Noonan

Judge of the Court of Appeal
- Incumbent
- Assumed office 4 November 2019
- Nominated by: Government of Ireland
- Appointed by: Michael D. Higgins

Judge of the High Court
- In office 22 September 2014 – 4 November 2019
- Nominated by: Government of Ireland
- Appointed by: Michael D. Higgins

Personal details
- Education: Trinity College Dublin; King's Inns

Seamus Noonan is an Irish judge who has served as a Judge of the Court of Appeal since November 2019. He previously served as a Judge of the High Court from 2014 to 2019.

== Early career ==
Noonan is from County Meath. He was educated at Trinity College Dublin, where he received an LLB in 1976. He was called to the bar in July 1977 and became a senior counsel in 2007.

His practice as a barrister primarily consisted of medical negligence and personal injuries law.

While in practice, he was also a decision-maker. He was an accredited mediator, member of the Living Donor Ethics Committee at Beaumont Hospital, Dublin and arbitrator in disputes involving the Society of the Irish Motor Industry.

== Judicial career ==
=== High Court ===
Noonan was appointed to the High Court in September 2014.

He was the Judge-in-Charge of the Judicial Review and Non-Jury Lists. He heard cases in this area involving school expulsions, matters arising out of the Disclosures Tribunal, and planning law appeals. He refused an application taken by Independent News & Media in 2018 seeking to prevent the Office of the Director of Corporate Enforcement from appointing inspectors to investigate the company.

While at the High Court, Noonan also heard cases involving defamation, insolvency, and defamation.

=== Court of Appeal ===
Following the enactment of legislation to increase the number of judges of the Court of Appeal in 2019, Noonan was appointed a Judge of the Court of Appeal in November 2019.

Since November 2019, Noonan has been a member of the Judicial Council's Personal Injuries Guidelines Committee to advise on recommended awards for personal injuries.
