= Cormac O'Raifeartaigh =

Irish physicist

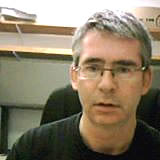
- Education: University College Dublin; Trinity College Dublin
- Scientific career
- Fields: Physics
- Institutions: Waterford Institute of Technology
- Website: antimatter.ie

Cormac O'Raifeartaigh (also known as Cormac O'Rafferty) is an Irish physicist based at Waterford Institute of Technology in Ireland. A solid-state physicist by training, he is best known for several contributions to the study of the history and philosophy of 20th century science, including the discovery that Albert Einstein once attempted a steady-state model of the expanding universe, many years before Fred Hoyle.

O'Raifeartaigh is known to the public as the author of the science blog Antimatter and a monthly science column in The Irish Times. As a science ambassador for Discover Science & Engineering Ireland, he is a frequent participant in scientific debates in the Irish media.

O'Raifeartaigh graduated from University College Dublin in 1988 with a BSc Hons in experimental physics. A PhD in solid-state physics from Trinity College Dublin in 1994 was followed by Marie Curie Research Fellowships at Aarhus University, Denmark and Trinity College Dublin. He currently lectures in physics at Waterford Institute of Technology and is a visiting associate professor at the School of Physics at University College Dublin.

O'Raifeartaigh was elected a Fellow of the Royal Astronomical Society in 2014 and a Fellow of the Institute of Physics in 2016. He is a research associate at the School of Theoretical Physics of the Dublin Institute for Advanced Studies and was a research fellow at the Science, Technology and Society Program at Harvard University in 2010–2011.

Cormac is the youngest son of the late Lochlainn O'Raifeartaigh, an Irish theoretical particle physicist.
