= John A. Edwards =

Irish judge (born 1960)

The Hon. Mr. Justice John A. Edwards

Judge of the Court of Appeal
- Incumbent
- Assumed office 4 December 2014
- Nominated by: Government of Ireland
- Appointed by: Michael D. Higgins

Judge of the High Court
- In office 3 May 2007 – 4 December 2014
- Nominated by: Government of Ireland
- Appointed by: Mary McAleese

Personal details
- Born: John Aloysious Edwards; 3 January 1960 (age 66) Limerick, Ireland
- Education: University College Dublin; Trinity College Dublin; King's Inns

John Aloysious Edwards (born 3 January 1960) is an Irish judge who has served as a Judge of the Court of Appeal since November 2014. He previously served as a Judge of the High Court from 2007 to 2014.

== Early life ==
Edwards attended Castleknock College until 1978. He attended University College Dublin where he obtained a BCL degree and a Diploma in European Studies. He also attended Trinity College Dublin and received qualifications in arbitration. He trained to be a barrister at King's Inns. He is undertaking a PhD.

== Legal career ==
He was called to the Bar in 1983 and became a Senior Counsel in 1998. His practice at the bar was centred on criminal law and judicial review. He frequently appeared for both the Director of Public Prosecutions and defendants in criminal trials, including those involving murder, arson, pornography, fraud, drugs offences, assault, terrorism offences, and sexual offences. He was the State Prosecutor for County Kerry for ten years.

He is an adjunct professor in the School of Law at the University of Limerick and a Fellow of the Chartered Institute of Arbitrators.

== Judicial career ==
Edwards was appointed a High Court judge in May 2007. He was the judge in charge of the Extradition and European Arrest Warrant list from 2011 to 2014.

He was appointed to the Court of Appeal in December 2014.

He has held several positions within his role as judge, including membership of the Superior Courts Rules Committee, the European Association of Judges, and the Second Study Commission of the International Association of Judges. He joined the Association of Judges of Ireland at its foundation in 2011 and served a two-year term as president from November 2017.

He is currently one of three members of the Irish panel of Ad hoc judges at the European Court of Human Rights.
