= Thirty-third Amendment of the Constitution of Ireland =

2013 amendment to establish a Court of Appeal

- 4 October 2013
- Establishment of a Court of Appeal

Results
Choice	Votes	%
Yes	795,008	65.16%
No	425,047	34.84%
Valid votes	1,220,055	98.38%
Invalid or blank votes	20,080	1.62%
Total votes	1,240,135	100.00%
Registered voters/turnout	3,167,484	39.15%

The Thirty-third Amendment of the Constitution (Court of Appeal) Act 2013 is an amendment to the Constitution of Ireland which established a Court of Appeal to sit between the existing High and Supreme Courts for the purpose of taking over most of the appellate jurisdiction of the Supreme Court. The amendment was approved by the electorate in a referendum on 4 October 2013, and then signed into law by President Michael D. Higgins on 1 November 2013.

While the amendment provided for the new court to hear most appeals, it also provided for exceptions that could go directly to the Supreme Court. The Thirty-third Amendment makes appeals from the Court of Appeal to the Supreme Court subject to obtaining the Supreme Court's leave. Such leave would only be granted in cases of general public importance or in the interests of justice. The intent of the amendment was to reduce the work load of the Supreme Court, allowing it to concentrate on a smaller number of more important cases. Before the adoption of the amendment, the Supreme Court had mandatory jurisdiction—civil cases decided by the High Court were directly appealable to the Supreme Court, which had no choice over which appeals it heard.

The bill was passed through both houses of the Oireachtas on 24 July 2013. A referendum was held on 4 October 2013, at which 65.1% voted in favour, on a turnout of 39.15%. The Court of Appeal was created in October 2014 under statutes mandated by the amended Constitution.

== Background ==
The Constitution provided for the establishment of two courts: the Supreme Court and the High Court. Other courts may be established by statute but may not question the constitutionality of legislation. The High Court is a court of first instance with general original jurisdiction, hearing the most important cases in civil law and criminal law (in the latter case sitting as the Central Criminal Court). The High Court also acts as an appellate court for cases initially heard before the Circuit Court, a court of limited jurisdiction.

The Supreme Court hears appeals from the High Court and the Court of Criminal Appeal and, less often, referrals of bills from the President under Article 26 of the Constitution. While the Supreme Court has the final authority to interpret the Constitution, many cases it hears are not constitutional in nature. In 1971 there were five Justices on the Supreme Court and seven on the High Court; in 2009 the respective figures were eight and 36. The number of cases appealed to the Supreme Court has increased faster than the number of justices, resulting in a backlog of several years. In 2006 the then government established a Working Group on a Court of Appeal, chaired by Susan Denham, who was then an ordinary Justice of the Supreme Court and became Chief Justice in 2010. The Working Group's report was published in May 2009.

The 2013 bill was published by Alan Shatter, the Minister for Justice and Equality, on 9 July 2013. It was along the lines of the recommendations of the 2009 Working Group's report.

The bill made one change not related to the new Court of Appeal: removing the "one-judgment rule" which provided that only one opinion could be given by the Supreme Court on constitutional cases. The deletion allowed divergent views, such as in concurring and dissenting opinions, to be published. This change only applies to reviews under Article 34, not review of bills under Article 26.

== Changes ==
The substantive changes to the Constitution were to Article 34, which defines the court system.

Section	Subsection	Existing text	New text	Section of bill effecting
1		Justice shall be administered in courts established by law by judges appointed in the manner provided by this Constitution, and, save in such special and limited cases as may be prescribed by law, shall be administered in public.	No change	
2		The Courts shall comprise Courts of First Instance and a Court of Final Appeal.	The Courts shall comprise: i Courts of First Instance; ii a Court of Appeal; and iii a Court of Final Appeal.	3(a,b)
3	1°-4°	Describes the Courts of First Instance, including the High Court	No change	
4 new)	1°–3°	New section	1° The Court of Appeal shall— i save as otherwise provided by this Article, and ii with such exceptions and subject to such regulations as may be prescribed by law, have appellate jurisdiction from all decisions of the High Court, and shall also have appellate jurisdiction from such decisions of other courts as may be prescribed by law. 2° No law shall be enacted excepting from the appellate jurisdiction of the Court of Appeal cases which involve questions as to the validity of any law having regard to the provisions of this Constitution. 3° The decision of the Court of Appeal shall be final and conclusive, save as otherwise provided by this Article.	3(c,d)
5 [was 4]	1°	The Court of Final Appeal shall be called the Supreme Court.	No change	
5 [was 4]	2°	The president of the Supreme Court shall be called the Chief Justice.	No change	
5 [was 4]	3°	The Supreme Court shall, with such exceptions and subject to such regulations as may be prescribed by law, have appellate jurisdiction from all decisions of the High Court, and shall also have appellate jurisdiction from such decisions of other courts as may be prescribed by law.	The Supreme Court shall, subject to such regulations as may be prescribed by law, have appellate jurisdiction from a decision of the Court of Appeal if the Supreme Court is satisfied that— i the decision involves a matter of general public importance, or ii in the interests of justice it is necessary that there be an appeal to the Supreme Court.	5(2)(a,b)
5 [was 4]	4°	New section	Notwithstanding section 4.1° hereof, the Supreme Court shall, subject to such regulations as may be prescribed by law, have appellate jurisdiction from a decision of the High Court if the Supreme Court is satisfied that there are exceptional circumstances warranting a direct appeal to it, and a precondition for the Supreme Court being so satisfied is the presence of either or both of the following factors: i the decision involves a matter of general public importance; ii the interests of justice.	5(2)(c,d)
5 [was 4]	5° [was 4°]	No law shall be enacted excepting from the appellate jurisdiction of the Supreme Court cases which involve questions as to the validity of any law having regard to the provisions of this Constitution.	No change except renumbering	5(2)(e)
5 [was 4]	5°	The decision of the Supreme Court on a question as to the validity of a law having regard to the provisions of this Constitution shall be pronounced by such one of the judges of that Court as that Court shall direct, and no other opinion on such question, whether assenting or dissenting, shall be pronounced, nor shall the existence of any such other opinion be disclosed.	Deleted	5(2)(f,g)
5 [was 4]	6°	The decision of the Supreme Court shall in all cases be final and conclusive.	No change	
6 [was 5]		Prescribes the oath of office for judges	No change	

The other changes are:

Schedule 2
inserted a transitory article 34A to mandate the establishment of the new Court of Appeal by an ordinary Act of the Oireachtas. (In accordance with one of its own provisions, this article was deleted from the official text of the constitution on 28 October 2014, the day the Court of Appeal was established.)
Schedule 6
scattered consequential amendments to refer to the new Court wherever the Supreme Court and High Court are currently mentioned.
Schedule 7
inserted a transitory article 64 to allow appeals from the High Court pending before the Supreme Court at the creation of the Court of Appeal to be transferred to the new Court. (In accordance with one of its own provisions, this article was deleted from the official text of the constitution on 28 October 2015, one year after the Court of Appeal was established.)
Schedule 8
a consequential amendment which would only have been relevant if the Seanad Abolition Bill had become law. That bill was put to referendum the same day as this bill, and was rejected.

The President of the High Court continues to be an ex officio member both of the Council of State and of the Supreme Court (the latter provision is by statute, not under the Constitution). The President of the new court is also a member of both bodies. The existing Court of Criminal Appeal was merged with the new Court of Appeal. The government plans to reduce the number of Supreme Court judges from ten to five as sitting justices retire.

== Debate ==
The bill was supported by all parties in the Dáil and in the Seanad, including the four largest parties, Fine Gael, Labour, Fianna Fáil, and Sinn Féin, all of which ran low-key campaigns. On 1 October 2013 all four issued a joint statement urging a Yes-vote.

A Referendum Commission was established, as required by law, to oversee the referendum to be held on 4 October 2013. The referendum commission's dedicated website was launched on 5 September 2013.

Alan Shatter expressed concern that the referendum would be overshadowed by the simultaneous referendum proposing abolition of the Seanad. Shatter also criticised RTÉ's coverage of the referendum, suggesting it avoided discussing the issue at all for fear of violating its obligation of neutrality.

Elizabeth Dunne, the High Court judge who chaired the Referendum Commission, expressed concern about the lack of public debate on the Court of Appeal proposal.

In a speech on 27 September, Chief Justice Susan Denham described the current backlog of court cases as "unsustainable" and the referendum as "an invitation for citizens to enable the superior courts to work better"; she did not explicitly advocate a yes vote, because separation of powers required judges to be impartial. Michael Williams, a solicitor opposed to the referendum, felt the speech "stepped across the line" into politics. The Law Society of Ireland, the professional body for solicitors, recommended that its members advise clients to vote yes. The Bar Council of Ireland, the body for barristers, also called for a Yes-vote. The Irish Farmers' Association advised farmers to support the bill to reduce delays in litigation.

Michael Williams wrote in The Irish Times that the Court of Appeal was no substitute for a more fundamental reform of the Irish judicial system, which he said was unlikely as it would challenge the vested interests of lawyers. Mattie McGrath expressed a similar viewpoint and called for a No-vote. While Williams favours removing the one-judgment rule, he criticised the joining of that with the Court of Appeal in a single amendment requiring a single referendum. Seth Barrett Tillman, a lecturer in law at National University of Ireland, Maynooth, considered that, since the Court of Criminal Appeal had been created without a constitutional amendment, the same ought to be possible for a Civil Court of Appeal. Lawyer Paul Anthony McDermott suggested the delays in hearing cases were caused by too many litigants rather than too few judges or courts. Diarmuid Rossa Phelan, a prominent Irish barrister and law professor at the School of Law at Trinity College Dublin, suggested that giving the Supreme Court absolute discretion to select which cases to hear was dangerous and would need to be monitored for mission creep. The Master of the High Court, Edmund Honohan, described the proposal as a "crude device" that would lead to an increase in litigation and in interlocutory appeals, and claimed the Supreme Court's backlog could be cleared by addressing "case management, time management, paper management, submissions and so forth".

The Irish Times noted that "few voices" were "raised against the amendment" and that awareness of the issues was hampered by the prohibition of publicly funded advocacy campaigning; it recommended a Yes-vote. Ruadhan Mac Cormaic, legal affairs correspondent for the Times, reported that many lawyers were privately sceptical that the court would reduce the backlog, and that if its cases were perceived tediously technical it might struggle to recruit high-quality judges.

== Opinion polls ==
An opinion poll on 10–17 September 2013 asked how well voters felt they understood the issue. Of respondents, 6% said "very well", 9% "quite well", 30% "to some extent", 21% "not particularly well" and 33% "not at all".

Likely voting intentions
Date	Source	Polling agency	Sample size	Yes	No	Undecided	Ref
27–28 September 2013	The Irish Times	Ipsos MRBI	1,000	43%	14%	44%	
10–17 September 2013	The Sunday Times	Behaviour & Attitudes	934	59%	16%	25% (Note: 22% don't know; 3% won't vote)	

== Voting card error ==
Dublin City Council apologised after using an out-of-date electoral register file to generate polling information cards; this resulted in 35,000 voters and deceased people receiving incorrect information about where to vote. Cards were regenerated using the correct data.

== Result ==
Thirty-third Amendment of the Constitution Bill 2013
Choice	Votes	%
For	795,008	65.16
Against	425,047	34.84
Total	1,220,055	100.00
Valid votes	1,220,055	98.38
Invalid/blank votes	20,080	1.62
Total votes	1,240,135	100.00
Registered voters/turnout	3,167,484	39.15

Results by constituency
Constituency	Electorate	Turnout (%)	Votes		Proportion of votes	
Constituency	Electorate	Turnout (%)	Yes	No	Yes	No
Carlow–Kilkenny	111,304	37.2%	25,902	14,759	63.7%	36.3%
Cavan–Monaghan	100,434	34.5%	21,050	12,827	62.1%	37.9%
Clare	79,295	38.5%	19,385	10,591	64.7%	35.3%
Cork East	81,534	39.0%	19,367	11,852	62.1%	37.9%
Cork North-Central	74,828	38.6%	17,811	10,599	62.7%	37.3%
Cork North-West	62,118	42.1%	16,076	9,571	62.7%	37.3%
Cork South-Central	90,662	42.3%	24,837	12,986	65.7%	34.3%
Cork South-West	59,813	42.4%	15,764	9,128	63.3%	36.7%
Donegal North-East	58,032	29.2%	9,361	7,270	56.3%	43.7%
Donegal South-West	61,656	30.5%	11,978	6,448	65.0%	35.0%
Dublin Central	55,018	36.9%	13,431	6,571	67.2%	32.8%
Dublin Mid-West	65,093	38.2%	16,194	8,363	65.9%	34.1%
Dublin North	69,488	40.6%	19,258	8,682	68.9%	31.1%
Dublin North-Central	53,884	48.2%	17,325	8,326	67.5%	32.5%
Dublin North-East	58,444	43.6%	16,856	8,366	66.8%	33.2%
Dublin North-West	50,943	36.3%	11,846	6,414	64.9%	35.1%
Dublin South	101,884	46.0%	33,959	12,334	73.4%	26.6%
Dublin South-Central	79,173	38.1%	19,740	10,055	66.3%	33.7%
Dublin South-East	55,442	40.5%	17,020	5,195	76.6%	23.4%
Dublin South-West	69,879	37.9%	17,541	8,700	66.8%	33.2%
Dublin West	62,192	39.7%	16,266	7,728	67.8%	32.2%
Dún Laoghaire	79,207	46.2%	26,209	9,899	72.6%	27.4%
Galway East	82,588	36.1%	18,269	10,907	62.6%	37.4%
Galway West	91,994	35.7%	21,373	10,806	66.4%	33.6%
Kerry North–West Limerick	61,998	37.1%	13,831	8,663	61.5%	38.5%
Kerry South	56,532	39.2%	13,602	8,090	62.7%	37.3%
Kildare North	75,043	41.1%	20,295	10,175	66.6%	33.4%
Kildare South	57,454	38.1%	13,636	7,959	63.1%	36.9%
Laois–Offaly	106,057	37.3%	24,416	14,584	62.6%	37.4%
Limerick	65,186	38.4%	15,062	9,468	61.4%	38.6%
Limerick City	64,909	37.9%	16,061	8,178	66.3%	33.7%
Longford–Westmeath	85,791	36.8%	19,146	11,839	61.8%	38.2%
Louth	102,088	37.9%	24,372	13,783	63.9%	36.1%
Mayo	94,860	37.9%	23,596	11,713	66.8%	33.2%
Meath East	64,440	37.4%	15,466	8,324	65.0%	35.0%
Meath West	62,891	35.8%	13,785	8,372	62.2%	37.8%
Roscommon–South Leitrim	59,006	42.9%	15,197	9,623	61.2%	38.8%
Sligo–North Leitrim	60,228	39.8%	14,631	8,839	62.3%	37.7%
Tipperary North	62,233	42.8%	16,571	9,502	63.6%	36.4%
Tipperary South	56,060	41.7%	15,262	7,673	66.5%	33.5%
Waterford	76,442	40.7%	18,825	11,697	61.7%	38.3%
Wexford	106,329	38.7%	26,478	13,924	65.5%	34.5%
Wicklow	94,932	45.1%	27,958	14,264	66.2%	33.8%
Total	3,167,384	39.2%	795,008	425,047	65.2%	34.8%

== Enactment and implementation ==
The referendum returning officer issued a provisional result certificate of the votes, which was published in Iris Oifigiúil on 8 October 2013. As no petition challenging the results was lodged at the High Court by 15 October, the certificate became final. President Michael D. Higgins signed the bill into law on 1 November 2013, after returning from a state visit to Central America.

Before the new court could come into being, statutory laws regulating its operation must be passed, and judges recruited. Sean Ryan was announced as the President-designate of the new Court on 25 February 2014. The Court of Appeal Act 2014 was introduced as a government bill on 2 July 2014, passed by the Dáil on 15 July and the Seanad on 16 July, and signed by the President on 20 July. On 23 July the government named six High Court judges who would be transferred to the new Court under Ryan. Statutory instruments commenced the 2014 Act in two stages in September and October 2014. The Court of Appeal came into being on 28 October 2014 and its first nine judges were appointed by the President at 6.30 pm the following day.

In September 2016, a paper in The Irish Law Times claimed "the Court of Appeal never had a prayer of solving the problem that was put to the people in this referendum, which was solving the backlog", with 1,814 cases pending at the end of 2015 compared to 2,001 cases at the start. A spokesperson for the court said it would process cases faster when it "finds its rhythm".
