= Robert Haughton =

Irish judge

The Hon. Mr. Justice Robert Haughton

Judge of the Court of Appeal
- Incumbent
- Assumed office 4 November 2019
- Nominated by: Government of Ireland
- Appointed by: Michael D. Higgins

Judge of the High Court
- In office 30 October 2014 – 4 November 2019
- Nominated by: Government of Ireland
- Appointed by: Michael D. Higgins

Personal details
- Education: Trinity College Dublin; King's Inns

Robert Haughton is an Irish judge and lawyer who has served as a Judge of the Court of Appeal since November 2019. He previously served as a Judge of the High Court from 2014 to 2019. He has also additionally served as the Chair of the Constituency Commission.

== Early life ==
Haughton was educated at Trinity College Dublin and the King's Inns. He was called to the Bar in 1979 and became a senior counsel in 2004.

He was the chair of Bloomfield Hospital between 2005 and 2012.

== Judicial career ==
=== High Court ===
Haughton became a High Court judge in October 2014.

In July 2019, he noted that no woman had been appointed an examiner since the process was established in Ireland. The following day Sarah-Jane O’Keeffe became the first female examiner in the State.

=== Constituency Commission ===
He was appointed by the Chief Justice of Ireland to chair the Constituency Commission in July 2016 to review the boundaries of Dáil constituencies and Irish European Parliament constituencies. The committee increased the number of Teachta Dála from 158 and 160 and left the boundaries for European elections unchanged.

He was appointed to review the European Parliament constituencies again in 2018 following the increase in seats allocated to Ireland following Brexit. The committee increased by one the numbers of seats in Ireland South and Dublin.

=== Court of Appeal ===
He was one of seven appointments to the Court of Appeal in November 2019. This followed a change in the law in order to increase the number of judges to sit on the Court of Appeal.
