= European Network of Councils for the Judiciary =

Organisation of the European Union

The European Network of Councils for the Judiciary (ENCJ) (in French, Réseau européen des Conseils de la Justice) is the European organization that unites the councils of the judiciary – national bodies in support of the Judiciary. From June 2024 the chairman is the French judge Madeleine Mathieu. Presidents change every two years.

The ENCJ opts for cooptation of the judiciary and against the influence of parliamentary representatives in the composition of its ranks. It played an important role in the criticism from the European Union on developments in the control of the judiciary from parliament and executive power in countries such as Poland or Hungary.

== Presidents ==
Judges who have served as president of the ENCJ.

President	Country	Term
Madeleine Mathieu	France	June 2024 – present
Dalia Vasarienė	Lithuania	June 2022 – June 2024
Filippo Donati	Italy	June 2020 – June 2022
Kees Sterk	Netherlands	June 2018 – June 2020
Nuria Diaz Abad	Spain	June 2016 – June 2018
Geoffrey Vos	United Kingdom (England and Wales)	2015 – June 2016
Paul Gilligan	Ireland	2013 – 2014
Miguel Carmona Ruano	Spain	2011 – 2012
John Thomas	United Kingdom (England and Wales)	2008 – 2010
Edith Van den Broeck	Belgium	2007 – 2008
Luigi Berlinguer	Italy	2004 – 2007
