= Courts of Justice Act 1924 =

National law of the Irish Free State

Oireachtas
- Long title: AN ACT FOR THE ESTABLISHMENT OF COURTS OF JUSTICE PURSUANT TO THE CONSTITUTION OF SAORSTAT EIREANN AND FOR PURPOSES RELATING TO THE BETTER ADMINISTRATION OF JUSTICE
- Citation: No. 10 of 1924
- Enacted by: Dáil Éireann
- Enacted by: Seanad Éireann
- Assented to: 12 April 1924
- Commenced: 5 June – 16 August 1924

Legislative history

Initiating chamber: Dáil Éireann
- Bill title: Courts of Justice Bill 1923
- Bill citation: Bill 48 of 1923
- Introduced by: William T. Cosgrave
- First reading: 20 September 1923
- Second reading: 25 September 1923
- Committee stage: 10 October – 1 November; 4 December 1923
- Third reading: 11 December 1923

Revising chamber: Seanad Éireann
- Second reading: 16 January 1924
- Committee stage: 25 January – 8 February 1924
- Third reading: 28 March 1924

Related legislation
- Supreme Court of Judicature Act (Ireland) 1877
- Status: Amended

The Courts of Justice Act 1924 (Irish: Acht Cúirteanna Breithiúnais, 1924) was an Act of the Oireachtas (No. 10 of 1924) that established a new system of courts for the Irish Free State (now the Republic of Ireland). Among the new courts was the Supreme Court of the Irish Free State, and the first Chief Justice of the Irish Free State was also appointed under the Act.

Once the Act came into operation, the courts previously established by the Parliament of the United Kingdom (when Ireland was still part of the United Kingdom of Great Britain and Ireland) ceased to exist. In parallel with this process, the revolutionary Dáil Courts system created in 1919 during the War of Independence was also wound up, by Acts passed in 1923 and 1925.

== Background ==
The framework for the 1924 act was the 1922 Constitution of the Irish Free State, which specified two superior courts, the High Court and Supreme Court, and allowed for lower courts. As a transitory measure, the Constitution allowed the pre-independence courts to continue until the new courts were established by statute. The previous superior courts, established for all Ireland by the Supreme Court of Judicature Act (Ireland) 1877 and again for Southern Ireland by the Government of Ireland Act 1920, had largely continued to function during the Irish War of Independence. Lower-level British-aligned courts, such as the assizes and county courts, had been severely disrupted by the rival Dáil Courts of the separatist Irish Republic. During the Irish Civil War, the Provisional Government suspended the Dáil Courts as too sympathetic to its republican opponents, but without entirely reviving the British system. Initially martial law was applied, and later District Courts were created on a temporary basis.

In early 1923, the Executive Council established a committee to advise on the permanent courts system. The members were appointed on the advice of Hugh Kennedy, the Attorney-General. It was chaired by James Campbell, 1st Baron Glenavy, then Cathaoirleach of Seanad Éireann and formerly Lord Chancellor of Ireland. Other members were Kennedy; government-aligned barristers John O'Byrne and Timothy Sullivan; District Court judge Louis Joseph Walsh; pre-independence judges Charles O'Connor and William John Johnston; Dáil Court judges James Creed Meredith and Cahir Davitt; solicitors P. J. Brady and Henry Murphy; and businessman William Hewat. Mícheál Smidic (Michael Smithwick) was secretary. The committee submitted its report in May, which was unanimous although less of a departure from the British model than Kennedy would have preferred.

The Courts of Justice Bill, closely following the Glenavy Committee's recommendations, was introduced in Dáil Éireann on 31 July 1923 but lapsed when the Dáil was dissolved in August for a general election. The bill was reintroduced in the new Dáil on 20 September 1923 and given royal assent by the Governor-General on 12 April 1924.

== Court structure ==
The jurisdiction of all of the courts then sitting in the Irish Free State was transferred to the new courts created by the Act:

- The Court of Appeal was replaced by the Supreme Court of Justice and a Court of Criminal Appeal.
- The High Court of Justice was replaced by a new court with the same name and similar jurisdiction. However, the new court was no longer divided into separate divisions (i.e. the King's Bench and Chancery divisions). The President of the High Court replaced the Lord Chief Justice of Ireland as chief judge of this court.
- The assizes were replaced, in Dublin, by the Central Criminal Court. Outside Dublin they were intended to be replaced by courts of the High Court Circuit, but this was never constituted.
- The jurisdiction of the Quarter Sessions and the county courts was merged into a single Circuit Court of Justice.
- The jurisdiction of the temporary district justices and the divisional magistrates of the Dublin Metropolitan Police Court was merged into a single District Court of Justice, which could also try minor civil matters. The temporary district justices had been introduced in 1923 to replace petty sessions, which had not been held for some years in much of Ireland due to the War of Independence.

The offices of justice of the peace and resident magistrate were permanently abolished. As a result, there would in principle no longer be any lay magistrates in the Irish Free State: all judges would be legally qualified and would work full-time. However, the lay office of peace commissioner was created to exercise some of the functions of magistrates. Section 88(2) of the Act also required that a Peace Commission for a county in the Gaeltacht should "have a knowledge of the Irish language adequate for the transaction of the business of his office in that language".

All criminal prosecutions would now take place in the name of the People at the suit of the Attorney General, rather than The King as had previously been the case.

The Act did not affect the right of appeal from the Free State to the Judicial Committee of the Privy Council in London.

== Judicial appointments ==
Only two judges of the superior courts under the old court system were appointed to the courts established under the 1924 act: Charles O'Connor, who had been Master of the Rolls in Ireland from 1912, was appointed to the Supreme Court, and William Wylie was appointed to the High Court. The rest chose to avail of the act's early-retirement provisions. Of former County Court judges, two were appointed to the High Court and three to the Circuit Court.

== Subsequent developments ==
=== Abolition of the Court of the High Court Circuit ===
The Act established a Central Criminal Court to hear serious criminal cases in Dublin and the neighbouring counties, and made provision for Courts of the High Court Circuit (essentially, the Assizes in renamed form) to do the same outside Dublin. However the commissions for these courts were never sent out, leading to a backlog of defendants committed to trial before the courts but not being tried. Amending legislation (the Courts of Justice Act 1926) abolished the Courts of the High Court Circuit and transferred their jurisdiction to the Central Criminal Court. A serious criminal trial was not again held outside Dublin until the Central Criminal Court sat in Limerick in 2003.

=== Abolition of the right of appeal to the Judicial Committee of the Privy Council ===
The Constitution (Amendment No. 22) Act 1933 abolished the right of appeal from the Supreme Court of the Irish Free State to the Judicial Committee of the Privy Council. The Judicial Committee recognised in Moore vs Attorney General that the Statute of Westminster 1931 had allowed the Irish Free State to do this unilaterally despite abrogating the Anglo-Irish Treaty.

=== After the 1937 Constitution ===
The courts structure established by the 1924 Act remained largely unchanged in the decades after. When the Courts (Establishment and Constitution) Act 1961 established the new courts envisaged by the 1937 constitution, it merely re-established all the existing courts (removing the "of Justice" from their names to disambiguate) with the same jurisdictions as before. A Special Criminal Court was established in 1972 for the trial of certain offences by a three-judge panel rather than by jury. In 2014, a new Court of Appeal was created with appellate jurisdiction from the High Court, after an amendment to the Constitution the previous year.

== See also ==
- Courts of the Republic of Ireland
- Dáil Courts#Winding up

== Sources ==
=== Primary sources ===
Irish Statute Book

- Constitution of the Irish Free State (Saorstát Eireann) Act 1922, First Schedule: Constitution of the Irish Free State
- District Justices (Temporary Provisions) Act, 1923 (as enacted)
- Dáil Eireann Courts (Winding-Up) Act, 1923 (as enacted)
- County Courts (Amendment) Act, 1923 (as enacted)
- The Courts of Justice Act 1924 (as enacted)
  - The Courts of Justice Act 1924 (Commencement, Amendments, SIs made under the Act)
- Constitution of Ireland (as amended to 2019)
- Courts (Establishment and Constitution) Act 1961 (as enacted)

Courts of Justice Bill 1923—indexes of text and debates from the Oireachtas website

- Bill 41 of 1923—includes the text of, and debates on, the 3rd-Dáil bill; and (erroneously) the debates on the 4th-Dáil bill
- Bill 48 of 1923—includes the text of progressive versions of the 4th-Dáil bill (erroneously omitting the debates)

=== Secondary sources ===
- Howlin, Niamh, ed. (13 January 2025). A Century of Courts: The Courts of Justice Act 1924. Dublin: Four Courts Press. ISBN 978-1-80151-169-8.
