= Brian Murray (judge) =

Irish judge

The Hon. Mr. Justice Brian Murray
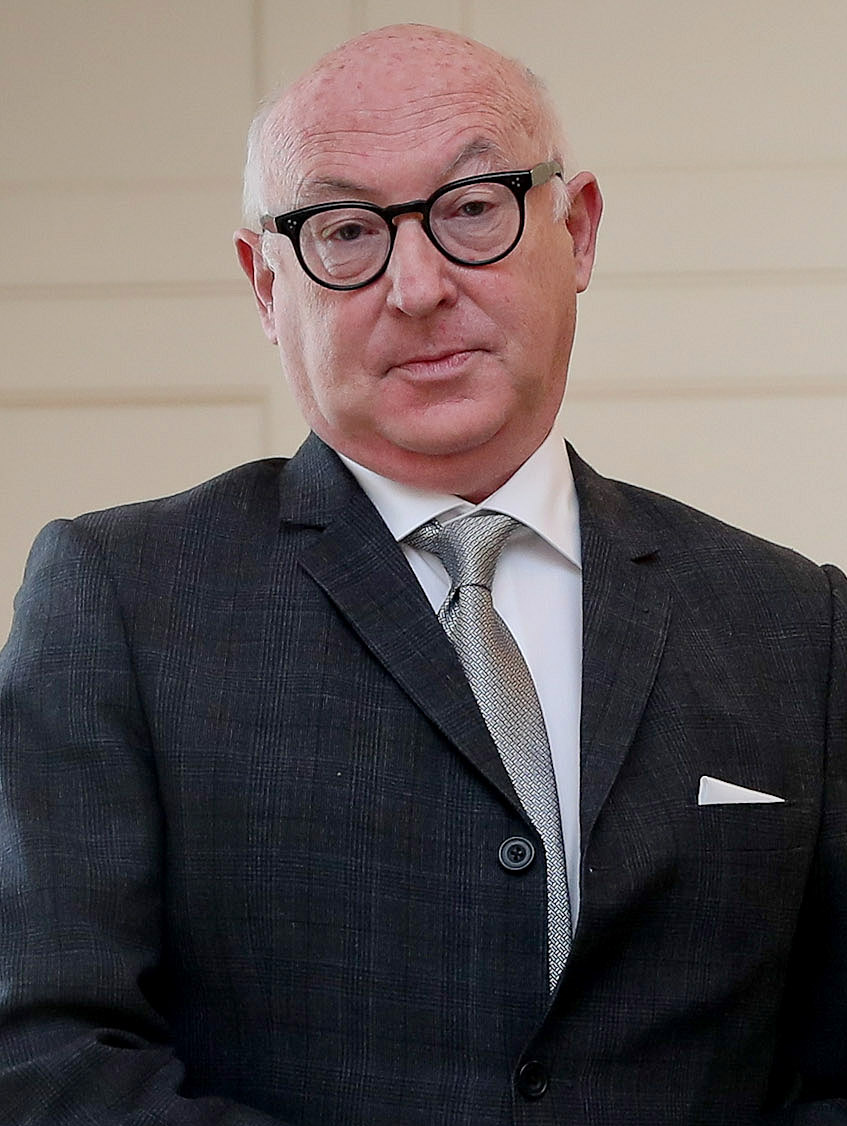
- Murray in 2022

Judge of the Supreme Court of Ireland
- Incumbent
- Assumed office 21 February 2022
- Nominated by: Government of Ireland
- Appointed by: Michael D. Higgins

Judge of the Court of Appeal
- In office 4 November 2019 – 21 February 2022
- Nominated by: Government of Ireland
- Appointed by: Michael D. Higgins

Personal details
- Education: Trinity College Dublin; University of Cambridge; King's Inns

Brian R. Murray is an Irish judge and lawyer who has served as a Judge of the Supreme Court since February 2022. He previously served as a Judge of the Court of Appeal from 2019 to 2022.

Prior to being appointed to the bench, he worked as a barrister practicing in public and commercial law.

== Early life ==
Murray received a BA degree from Trinity College Dublin and completed an LLM at the University of Cambridge. He won the Irish Times Debate in 1984 for the College Historical Society. He subsequently attended the King's Inns. He was called to the Bar in 1989 and became a senior counsel in 2002.

== Legal career ==
Murray practised in the areas of constitutional and commercial law. He represented the State in 2005 in defending a judicial review case taken by the former judge Brian Curtin. He has also appeared for the State and the Data Protection Commissioner in defending actions launched by Max Schrems, the Office of the Director of Corporate Enforcement in a case against Independent News & Media and the Irish Bank Resolution Corporation against members of the Seán Quinn family. He represented Bertie Ahern in the High Court against the Mahon Tribunal in 2008.

He has acted for the State in a first instance hearing taken by Graham Dwyer, the man convicted of the murder of Elaine O'Hara, in the High Court, regarding the applicability of the Data Retention Directive in Irish law. In addition to appearing in the Irish courts, Murray has also acted as counsel for Ireland in the two EU courts, the General Court and the Court of Justice. He acted for Ireland in Ireland v Commission.

He taught jurisprudence at Trinity College Dublin from 1986 to 1987 and again between 1988 and 1989, and subsequently lectured in Company Law between 1989 and 2003. He also lectured at the King's Inns.

He provided advice on the law of abortion at a meeting of the Citizens' Assembly in March 2017, which made recommendations which ultimately resulted in the Thirty-sixth Amendment of the Constitution of Ireland.

== Judicial career ==
=== Court of Appeal ===
Following the enactment of legislation to increase the number of judges of the Court of Appeal in 2019, Murray was appointed a judge of the Court of Appeal in November 2019. He has occasionally acted as a judge of the High Court.

Murray has written judgments for the Court of Appeal in the areas of judicial review, enforcement of debt, insolvency law, the proceeds of crime, media law, tax law, the law of tort, military law, contract law, and civil procedure.

=== Supreme Court ===
Murray was nominated to the Supreme Court of Ireland in January 2022. His appointment was made in February 2022.
