= Criminal Law Codification Advisory Committee =

The Criminal Law Codification Advisory Committee is a legal review committee established in 2006 by Michael McDowell, Minister for Justice, Equality and Law Reform, under the Criminal Justice Act 2006.

== Recommendations ==
The committee is chaired by Prof. Finbarr McAuley. It reported in 2011 making recommendations for codification of a number of provisions of Irish criminal law, namely offences against the person, theft and fraud, criminal damage and public order offences, as well as general concepts related to those four areas. A draft criminal code was published following its work. On publication, Prof. McAuley stated that "The recent publication by Minister for Justice Alan Shatter of the draft criminal code and commentary marks a watershed in Irish criminal law."

== Implementation ==
The draft criminal code prepared by the committee has not as yet been implemented.
