= Sean Ryan (judge) =

Irish judge (born 1948)

President of the Court of Appeal
- In office 28 October 2014 – 29 March 2018
- Nominated by: Government of Ireland
- Appointed by: Michael D. Higgins
- Preceded by: New office
- Succeeded by: George Birmingham

Judge of the Court of Appeal
- In office 28 October 2014 – 29 March 2018
- Nominated by: Government of Ireland
- Appointed by: Michael D. Higgins

Judge of the High Court
- In office 10 December 2003 – 28 October 2014
- Nominated by: Government of Ireland
- Appointed by: Mary McAleese

Personal details
- Born: 27 March 1948 (age 78) Dublin, Ireland
- Spouse: Ruth Ryan (m. 1980)
- Children: 3
- Education: University College Dublin; King's Inns

Sean Ryan (born 27 March 1948) is a retired Irish judge who served as president of the Court of Appeal and a judge of the Court of Appeal from 2014 to 2018, and a judge of the High Court from 2003 to 2014.

As a barrister, he was senior counsel to the inquiry into abuse in the Catholic diocese of Ferns (the Ferns Report), and was chairman of the Compensation Advisory Committee that prepared guidelines on compensation to be paid to abuse survivors at the Residential Institutions Redress Board.

In September 2003, Ryan was selected to head the Commission to Inquire into Child Abuse following the controversial resignation of the previous chair, Judge Mary Laffoy, who claimed her work had been systematically obstructed by the Department of Education. The government appointed him a High Court judge, without seeking a recommendation from the Judicial Appointments Advisory Board, "to guarantee that the integrity and independence of the chairperson will be maintained."

Ryan published the commission's public report on 20 May 2009 and it was immediately hailed as "a work of incalculable value to this country" and praised for its "meticulous gathering of evidence", though "Justice has not been done as many of the abusers will never face the rigours of the law."

In 2014, he was named by the Government as the president designate of the newly established Court of Appeal. He was nominated as president of the court by the Government on 29 October 2014 and appointed by the President of Ireland on the same day.

He retired from the bench in March 2018 given the statutory requirement.
