= Caroline Costello =

Irish judge

The Hon. Ms. Justice Caroline Costello

President of the Court of Appeal
- Incumbent
- Assumed office 24 July 2024
- Nominated by: Government of Ireland
- Appointed by: Michael D. Higgins
- Preceded by: George Birmingham

Judge of the Court of Appeal
- Incumbent
- Assumed office 13 November 2018
- Nominated by: Government of Ireland
- Appointed by: Michael D. Higgins

Judge of the High Court
- In office 22 September 2014 – 13 November 2018
- Nominated by: Government of Ireland
- Appointed by: Michael D. Higgins

Personal details
- Relations: Declan Costello (father); John A. Costello (grandfather)
- Education: University College Dublin; University of Oxford; King's Inns

Caroline Costello is an Irish judge who has served as President of the Court of Appeal since July 2024 and a Judge of the Court of Appeal since November 2018. She previously served as a Judge of the High Court from 2014 to 2018.

Costello graduated with a BA in Classics and History from University College Dublin in 1982. She subsequently attended the University of Oxford and the King's Inns. She became a barrister in 1988 and a senior counsel in 2010. She had a commercial-oriented practice, focusing on commercial law, banking law, and insolvency law.

She was appointed to the High Court in September 2014. She presided over High Court bankruptcy proceedings involving Seán Dunne. She served a term as chair of the judicial wing of INSOL Europe, a federation of insolvency lawyers. In 2018, she made a reference to the Court of Justice of the European Union arising out of an action taken by Max Schrems regarding the EU–US Privacy Shield.

She was appointed a Judge of the Court of Appeal in November 2018. Her appointment to the Court of Appeal along with Isobel Kennedy resulted in the first Irish court with a gender balanced number of judges.

She is the daughter of the former Attorney General of Ireland and President of the High Court Declan Costello and the granddaughter of former Taoiseach John A. Costello.
