= Irish criminal law =

As a common law jurisdiction, Ireland has no single criminal code. Instead, criminal law is set out in a diverse range of statutes and court decisions. Crime is investigated by the police force, the Garda Síochána. Serious offences are prosecuted by the Director of Public Prosecutions in the name of the People of Ireland, and are normally tried before a jury, although terrorist, and increasingly organised crime, trials are held in the juryless Special Criminal Court.

All judges in Ireland are full-time and appointed from legally qualified and experienced solicitors and barristers. There are neither lay magistrates nor elected judges.

The Criminal Justice Act 2006 established a Criminal Law Codification Advisory Committee to advise and report on codification of Irish criminal law.
