= Denis McDonald =

Irish barrister, High Court judge since 2018

The Hon. Mr. Justice Denis McDonald

Judge of the Court of Appeal
- Incumbent
- Assumed office 1 November 2024
- Nominated by: Government of Ireland
- Appointed by: Michael D. Higgins

Judge of the High Court
- In office 18 April 2018 – 31 October 2024
- Nominated by: Government of Ireland
- Appointed by: Michael D. Higgins

Personal details
- Education: Trinity College Dublin; King's Inns

Denis McDonald is an Irish judge and lawyer who has served as a Judge of the Court of Appeal since November 2024. He previously served as a Judge of the High Court from 2018 to 2024. He also previously practised as a barrister with a speciality in commercial law. He was the chair of the Irish Takeover Panel between 2010 and 2018.

== Early life ==
McDonald attended Trinity College Dublin, where he graduated with a law degree in 1984. He received a Barrister-at-Law degree from the King's Inns in 1986.

== Legal career ==
He was called to the Bar in July 1986 and became a senior counsel in October 2000. His practice was focused on commercial law.

He has represented Smart Telecom, Bank of America, Allied Irish Banks, Royal Dutch Shell, and Paddy McKillen. He was involved in several insolvency proceedings during the 1990s, including of the Irish Press, business interests of Larry Goodman and Windmill Lane Studios. He appeared for the administrators of businesses of Seán Quinn in the 2010s. He has acted at the Valuation Tribunal.

He appeared in the High Court for the Mahon Tribunal against The Irish Times and Bertie Ahern. He also appeared in court for the Smithwick Tribunal.

He was the lead counsel for the Competition Authority's case against the Beef Industry Development Society in the Irish courts and the European Court of Justice. The case was important in European Union competition law for determining "by object" restrictions in cartels. He acted for Ireland regarding the EU illegal State aid case against Apple in Ireland.

He represented Brian Curtin in impeachment proceedings before the Oireachtas and the Attorney General of Ireland in a case surrounding defamation proceedings being taken by two of the Birmingham Six.

He became the chairperson of the Irish Takeover Panel in October 2010. He was reappointed again in 2016.

He became a Bencher of the King's Inns in 2017.

== Judicial career ==
His appointment to the High Court was made in April 2018. He has been a member of the Commercial Court since October 2018 and as of 2021 he is the judge in charge of the Commercial Court. He has heard cases involving insolvency, injunctions, personal injuries, child law, judicial review, and constitutional law.

In 2020, he determined an appeal by Perrigo against a decision of the Revenue Commissioners regarding a €1.6 billion tax liability.

He was the judge in charge of personal insolvency matters until 2019. He presided in a personal insolvency case involving Frank McNamara.

A three-judge division of the High Court, in which he was a member with the President of the High Court Mary Irvine and Niamh Hyland, sat in June 2020. Ivana Bacik was the lead plaintiff in an action taken against the Taoiseach to ask the court if Seanad Éireann could sit without the nominated members of Seanad Éireann. The three judges held that it could not.

McDonald was nominated by Taoiseach Simon Harris's government as a judge of the Court of Appeal on the 31st of October 2024 and was appointed by President Michael D. Higgins on the 1st of November 2024.
