= Teresa Pilkington =

Judge of the Irish Court of Appeal, former barrister

The Hon. Ms. Justice Teresa Pilkington

Judge of the Court of Appeal
- Incumbent
- Assumed office 17 September 2020
- Nominated by: Government of Ireland
- Appointed by: Michael D. Higgins

Judge of the High Court
- In office 27 July 2018 – 17 September 2020
- Nominated by: Government of Ireland
- Appointed by: Michael D. Higgins

Personal details
- Education: University College Dublin; King's Inns

Teresa Pilkington is an Irish judge and lawyer who has served as a Judge of the Court of Appeal since September 2020. She previously served as a Judge of the High Court from 2018 to 2020.

== Education ==
Pilkington attended University College Dublin, from where she obtained a BA degree in 1981. She returned to the university in 1997 to obtain an LL.M. degree in commercial law in 1997.

== Legal career ==
She was called to the Bar in 1986 and became a senior counsel in 2012. Her practice focused on property law and probate, construction law, guardianship and charities law.

She was a member of the Property Registration Authority and was appointed to the Irish Financial Services Appeals Tribunal in 2013. She was a member of the Library Committee of the Bar Council.

She frequently lectured on her areas of practice.

== Judicial career ==
=== High Court ===
Pilkington was appointed to the High Court in July 2018. She has heard cases involving defamation, contractual disputes, procurement law, injunctions, bankruptcy, insolvency, company law and judicial review.

In 2018, she rejected an application by Nóirín O'Sullivan to bring defamation proceedings against the Irish Examiner. She oversaw bankruptcy proceedings of Seán Dunne.

She has been a member of the Rules of the Superior Courts Committee.

=== Court of Appeal ===
In August 2020, she was nominated to fill a vacancy on the Court of Appeal following the retirement of Brian McGovern. She was appointed on 17 September 2020.
