= Supreme Court of Ireland =

Highest court in Ireland

- Irish: Cúirt Uachtarach na hÉireann

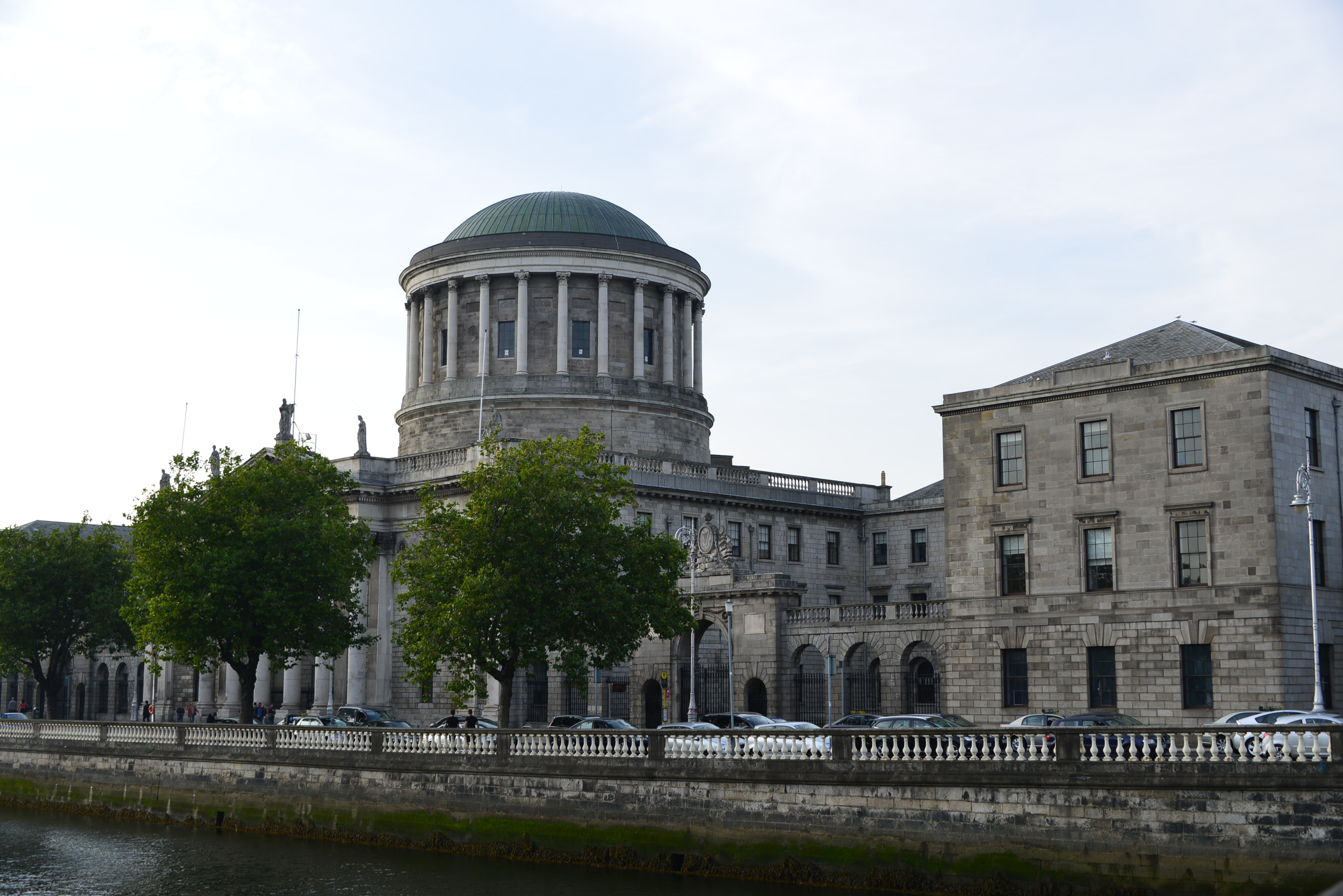
- The Supreme Court sits in the Four Courts in Dublin
- Interactive map of Supreme Court of Ireland
- 53.345899°N 6.273489°W
- Established: 29 September 1961
- Jurisdiction: Ireland
- Location: Four Courts, Dublin
- Coordinates: 53.345899°N 6.273489°W
- Composition method: Appointed by the President, acting on the binding advice of the Government
- Authorised by: Article 34 of the Constitution; Courts (Establishment and Constitution) Act 1961
- Appeals from: Court of Appeal; High Court
- Judge term length: Once appointed, a judge may only be removed by the Oireachtas for stated misbehaviour or incapacity. Mandatory retirement on reaching 70 years of age.
- Number of positions: 10 and 2 ex officio members
- Website: supremecourt.ie

Chief Justice
- Currently: Donal O'Donnell
- Since: 11 October 2021

The Supreme Court of Ireland (Irish: Cúirt Uachtarach na hÉireann) is the highest judicial authority in Ireland. It is a court of final appeal and exercises, in conjunction with the Court of Appeal and the High Court, judicial review over Acts of the Oireachtas (Irish parliament). The Supreme Court also has appellate jurisdiction to ensure compliance with the Constitution of Ireland by governmental bodies and private citizens. It sits in the Four Courts in Dublin.

== Establishment ==
The Supreme Court was formally established on 29 September 1961 under the terms of the 1937 Constitution of Ireland. Prior to 1961, a transitory provision of the 1937 Constitution permitted the Supreme Court of the Irish Free State to continue, though the justices were required to take the new oath of office prescribed by the 1937 Constitution. The latter court was established by the Courts of Justice Act 1924 under the terms of the 1922 Constitution of the Irish Free State. Prior to 1924, a transitory provision of the 1922 Constitution permitted the Supreme Court of Judicature to continue, the latter established in 1877 in the United Kingdom of Great Britain and Ireland. Whereas the 1924 act was a comprehensive revision of the court's foundation preserving little of the 1877 arrangement, the 1961 act was a brief formal restatement in terms of the 1937 Constitution.

== Composition ==
The Supreme Court consists of its president called the Chief Justice, and not more than nine ordinary members. There are two ex officio members: the President of the Court of Appeal who normally sits in the Court of Appeal, and the President of the High Court who normally sits in the High Court. The Supreme Court sits in divisions of three, five or seven judges. Two or more divisions may sit at the same time. When determining whether the President is permanently incapacitated within the meaning of Article 12 of the constitution, ruling on the constitutionality of a bill referred to it by the President under Article 26, or ruling on the constitutionality of any law the court must consist of at least five members.

Judges of the Supreme Court are appointed by the President of Ireland in accordance with the binding advice of the Government (cabinet), who, since 1995, act in turn on the non-binding advice of a judicial advisory board.

=== Current members ===
Name	Image	Appointed	Alma mater	Prior roles	Notes
Donal O'Donnell		March 2010	UCD (B.C.L.), UVA (LL.M), King's Inns		Chief Justice since Oct. 2021
Iseult O'Malley		October 2015	TCD (B.A. (Mod) Legal Science), King's Inns	Judge of the High Court (2012–2015)	
Séamus Woulfe		July 2020	TCD (B.A. (Mod) Legal Science), Dalhousie University (LL.M), King's Inns	Attorney General (2017–2020)	
Gerard Hogan		October 2021	UCD (B.C.L, LL.M, LL.D), Penn Law (LL.M), TCD (PhD), King's Inns	Advocate General of the Court of Justice (2018–2021); Judge of the Court of Appeal (2014–2018); Judge of the High Court (2010–2014)	
Brian Murray		February 2022	TCD, University of Cambridge (LL.M), King's Inns	Judge of the Court of Appeal (2019–2022)	
Maurice Collins		November 2022	UCC (B.A.), King's Inns	Judge of the Court of Appeal (2019–2022)	
Aileen Donnelly		June 2023	UCD (B.C.L., M.Equal.S), King's Inns	Judge of the Court of Appeal (2019–2023); Judge of the High Court (2014–2019)	
Niamh Hyland		April 2026	TCD (LL. B), University of Oxford (LL.M), King's Inns	Judge of the Court of Appeal (2024–2026); Judge of the High Court (2019–2024)	
Brian O'Moore		April 2026	TCD (LL. B), King's Inns	Judge of the Court of Appeal (2023–2026); Judge of the High Court (2019–2023)	

=== Ex officio members ===
Name	Since	Alma mater	Notes
Caroline Costello	July 2024	UCD, King's Inns	President of the Court of Appeal
David Barniville	July 2022	UCD, King's Inns	President of the High Court

=== Former members ===
- List of judges of the Supreme Court of Ireland

== Tenure ==
Under the Courts and Court Officers Act 1995, the retirement age of ordinary judges of the Supreme Court was reduced from 72 years to 70 years. Judges appointed prior to the coming into operation of that Act continued in office until aged 72. The Courts (No. 2) Act 1997 limited the term of office of a person appointed to the post of Chief Justice after the coming into operation of the Act to a period of seven years. A former Chief Justice may continue as a member of the Court until reaching the statutory retirement age.

== Jurisdiction ==
The Supreme Court hears appeals from the Court of Appeal, and as part of the transitional arrangements following the establishment of the Court of Appeal, from the High Court, the Court of Criminal Appeal and the Courts-Martial Appeal Court, where cases have not been transferred from the Supreme Court to the Court of Appeal. The Supreme Court also has jurisdiction to hear leapfrog appeals directly from the High Court in exceptional circumstances.

The Court's power to hear appeals can be severely restricted (as it is from the Court of Criminal Appeal and the Courts-Martial Appeal Court) or excluded altogether, with the exception of appeals concerning the consistency of a law with the constitution. The Supreme Court also hears points of law referred to it from the Circuit Court.

The Supreme Court has original jurisdiction in only two circumstances: when a Bill is referred to it by the President under Article 26 of the Constitution for an opinion on its constitutionality before promulgation, or when the court must determine under Article 12 of the Constitution whether the President has become incapacitated.

The Supreme Court originally had little discretion to determine which cases it hears as requirements to seek the leave of either the trial court or the Supreme Court itself before an appeal could be brought were rare. After the Thirty-third Amendment created the Court of Appeal, however, the Supreme Court's appellate jurisdiction is entirely by leave; the Supreme Court can refuse to hear any appeal (similar to the certiorari process in the Supreme Court of the United States).

== Judicial review ==
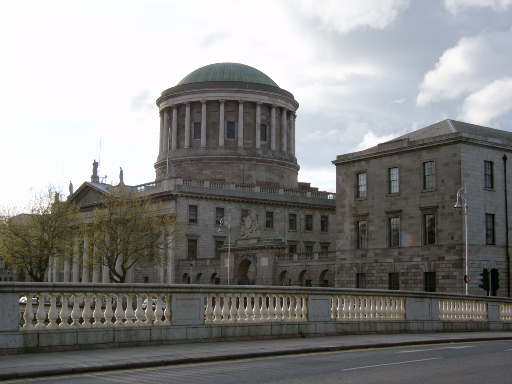
The Four Courts in Dublin.

The Supreme Court exercises, in conjunction with the High Court, the power to strike down laws which are inconsistent with the constitution. The courts also grant injunctions against public bodies, private bodies and citizens to ensure compliance with the constitution. The Irish constitution explicitly provides for the judicial review of legislation. Acts passed after the coming into force of the constitution, are invalid if "repugnant" to the constitution, while laws in force prior to the coming into force of the constitution are invalid if "inconsistent" with the constitution. The constitution also provides, under Article 26, for the judicial review of bills before they are (or would have been) signed into law. The power to refer bills is personally exercised by the President after consulting the Council of State. When the Supreme Court upholds the constitutionality of a bill referred to it under Article 26, its constitutionality can never again be questioned in any court whatsoever.

Supreme Court judges are normally free to deliver their own judgements, whether dissenting and concurring. There is an exception when considering the constitutionality of a bill referred by the President under Article 26 of the Constitution, for which only a single judgment can be delivered. Formerly, the single-judgment rule also applied when considering the constitutionality of an Act of the Oireachtas passed under the 1937 Constitution; this was removed by the 33rd Amendment in 2013. Acts passed prior to 1937 have always permitted multiple judgments. (Note: For example dissenting opinions were given in Norris v. The Attorney General, concerning the constitutionality of ss. 61 and 62 of the Offences Against the Person Act 1861, whereas only a single judgement was given in Buckley v. The Attorney General, concerning the constitutionality of the Sinn Féin Funds Act 1947.)

== Jurisprudence ==
After a slow start in its first two decades of the Constitution, the Supreme Court has expounded a significant constitutional jurisprudence. This slow start was partly because, prior to 1922, the whole of Ireland was a part of the United Kingdom, and Supreme Court judges had been trained in British jurisprudence, which stresses the sovereignty of parliament and deference to the legislature. It was also the case that under the 1922 Constitution there was a right of appeal to the Judicial Committee of the Privy Council which was exercised on a number of occasions.

Nonetheless, from the 1960s onwards, the court has made a number of significant decisions. It has, for example:

- Developed a doctrine of unenumerated rights based on an expansive reading of Article 40.3.1°, with elements of natural law and liberal democratic theory.
- Developed and defended the separation of powers.
- Ruled that major changes to the treaties establishing the European Union may not be ratified by the state unless allowed by a previously passed constitutional amendment.
- Ruled that Articles 2 and 3 (as they stood before 1999) did not impose obligations upon the state that were enforceable in a court of law.
- Discovered a broad right to privacy in marital affairs implicit in Article 41.
- Discovered a right to an abortion where there is a risk to the life of the mother through suicide in Article 40.3.3°.
- Imported the doctrine of proportionality into Irish law.

=== Significant rulings ===
- 1940 – State (Burke) v. Lennon, imprisonment without trial
- 1950 – Buckley v. The Attorney General (also known as the Sinn Féin Funds case) (right to property)
- 1965 – Ryan v. The Attorney General (doctrine of unenumerated rights)
- 1965 – Keaveney v. Geraghty (restrictions on frivolous and vexatious litigants) (re-affirmed in Wunder v. Hospitals Trust (1967))
- 1966 – The State (Nicolaou) v. An Bord Uchtála (constitutional family only that based on marriage)
- 1971 – Byrne v. Ireland (unconstitutionality of state immunity in tort)
- 1974 – McGee v. The Attorney General (marital privacy and contraceptives)
- 1976 – De Búrca v. The Attorney General (equality)
- 1979 – East Donegal Co-operative v. The Attorney General (natural justice)
- 1983 – Norris v. The Attorney General (criminalisation of homosexuality upheld)
- 1987 – Crotty v. An Taoiseach (ratification of European Union treaties)
- 1988 – Attorney General (Society for the Protection of the Unborn Child) v. Open Door Counselling (information relating to abortion)
- 1988 – Webb v. Ireland (non-survival of Crown prerogatives)
- 1992 – Attorney General v. X, more commonly the X case (abortion and risk of suicide)
- 1993 – Attorney General v. Hamilton (separation of powers)
- 1993 – Meagher v. The Minister for Agriculture (European Communities Act)
- 1994 – Heaney v. Ireland (doctrine of proportionality)
- 1995 – In re Article 26 and the Regulation of Information (Services outside the State for Termination of Pregnancies) Bill 1995 (supremacy of written constitution over natural law)
- 1995 – Re a Ward of court (right to die)
- 1995 – McKenna v. An Taoiseach (referendum campaign finance)
- 2001 – Sinnott v. Minister for Education (limitations on right to education)
- 2003 – Lobe and Osayande v. Minister for Justice (deportation of the parents of citizens)
- 2006 – Curtin v. Dáil Éireann (removal of judges)
- 2006 – A. v. The Governor of Arbour Hill Prison (unconstitutionality of a law does not retrospectively invalidate all actions taken under it)
- 2009 – McD v. L (established parental rights for sperm donors)
- 2013 – Marie Fleming v Ireland and the Attorney General (upheld the ban on assisted suicide)
- 2018 – M. v. Minister for Justice (constitutional rights of unborn)
- 2022 – Costello v. Government of Ireland (ratification of CETA)
- 2023 – Heneghan v. Minister for Housing, Planning and Local Government (enactment of the Seventh Amendment of the Constitution of Ireland)

== Sharing of sovereignty ==
Today the Supreme Court shares its authority with two supra-national courts: the European Court of Justice (ECJ) and the European Court of Human Rights (ECtHR). In matters relating to the correct interpretation of European Union law, decisions of the ECJ take precedence over those of the Irish Supreme Court.

The relationship between the Irish courts and the ECtHR is more complicated. The European Convention on Human Rights is a treaty binding on the state in international law. However, as a matter of Irish domestic law, the Convention is enshrined only in statute and does not have the status of constitutional law. Under the terms of the European Convention on Human Rights Act, passed by the Oireachtas in 2003, ordinary statutes must, when possible, be interpreted in line with the Convention. However, in Irish courts, the Convention must give way both to clear legislative intent and to any countermanding requirement of the Constitution. Furthermore, convention provisions cannot be relied upon as separate causes of action.

Supreme Court decisions cannot be appealed, as such, to either court. The ECJ hears cases referred to it by the Irish Courts by way of preliminary ruling and while unsuccessful litigants before the Supreme Court can apply to the ECtHR, the latter court's decision does not have the effect of voiding the Supreme Court's decision. As a matter of Irish domestic law, a decision of the ECtHR does not override acts of the Oireachtas, but instead, it must be brought to the attention of the Oireachtas, which may decide upon legislation or perhaps even a constitutional referendum to implement it.

== See also ==
- List of Irish Supreme Court cases
- Supreme court
- Dáil Courts
- Supreme Court of the Irish Free State
- Judiciary
- History of the Republic of Ireland
- Abortion in the Republic of Ireland
- Philip Sheedy affair
