= Court of Appeal (Ireland) =

Irish superior appellate court

The Court of Appeal (Irish: An Chúirt Achomhairc) is a court in Ireland that sits between the High Court and Supreme Court. Its jurisdiction derives from Article 34.4. It was established in 2014, taking over the existing appellate jurisdiction of the Supreme Court in 2014 and replacing the Court of Criminal Appeal and the Courts-Martial Appeal Court (subject to transitional provisions). Appeals to the Supreme Court are at that Court's discretion.

== Establishment ==
The superior courts provided under the Courts of Justice Act 1924 and the 1937 constitution were the High Court and the Supreme Court. By the 1990s, there was a large backlog of cases in which the Supreme Court was required to hear appeals from the High Court. The Supreme Court heard a greater number of cases than its counterparts in other common law states. A working group which reported in 2009 recommended introducing a new court to hear most appeals of High Court judgments, freeing up the Supreme Court to restrict itself to cases of constitutional importance. This would require amending the constitution to remove the general right to appeal to the Supreme Court and allow that court the discretion to decide which cases to hear itself.

A constitutional amendment along the lines of the 2009 report was approved in a referendum on 4 October 2013. The Court of Appeal Act 2014 gave effect in primary legislation to the new constitutional provision. The Rules of the Superior Courts and schedule of court fees were then amended by statutory instrument. The court came into operation on 28 October 2014.

In February 2014, the government announced that serving High Court judge Sean Ryan would be designated as the president of the new court. On 29 October 2014, the Government nominated Ryan and eight ordinary judges of the Court of Appeal, who were appointed by the President of Ireland on the same day. A ninth ordinary judge, John A. Edwards, was nominated on 11 November 2014, and appointed on 4 December 2014. Nine of the appointees to the new Court were judges of the High Court; one was promoted directly from the Circuit Court.

== Cases ==
On 28 October 2014, the Supreme Court transferred 258 cases to the Court of Appeal. It later transferred more, to a total of about 1,650 cases.

On 10 March 2015, the Court of Appeal overturned a May 2014 High Court ruling that section 2(2) of the Misuse of Drugs Act 1977 was unconstitutional, thus annulling statutory instruments made under section 2(2) which criminalised various designer drugs. The government had made contingency plans for emergency legislation after the High Court ruling, and an Act was rushed through the Oireachtas on 10–11 March 2015. International media reported on the one-day decriminalisation of MDMA and methamphetamine. The ruling was overturned again by the Irish Supreme Court in the following year in Bederev v Ireland.

In September 2016, a paper in The Irish Law Times claimed "the Court of Appeal never had a prayer of solving the problem that was put to the people in this referendum, which was solving the backlog", with 1,814 cases pending at the end of 2015 compared to 2,001 cases at the start. A spokesperson for the court said it would process cases faster when it "finds its rhythm". In October 2017, the court's president said it was "coming to the point of being overwhelmed" by its backlog of cases, with about 600 added annually compared to about 320 dealt with. The Supreme Court offered to take back some of the 650 cases still outstanding from those it had transferred in 2014.

In 2014, before the introduction of the Court of Appeal, the waiting time for appeals from the High Court was five to seven years. In 2018, it averaged one year for appeals to the Supreme Court and two years to the Court of Appeal.

== Composition ==
The Court of Appeal consists of its president, up to 18 ordinary judges, and two ex officio members: the Chief Justice (head of the Supreme Court) and the President of the High Court. The President of the Court of Appeal is ex officio an additional judge of both the Supreme Court and the High Court. The Courts Act 2019 increased the number of ordinary judges from 9 to 15.

=== Current members ===
- denotes President

Name	Since
Caroline Costello	July 2024
John A. Edwards	December 2014
Máire Whelan	June 2017
Patrick J. McCarthy	July 2018
Isobel Kennedy	November 2018
Seamus Noonan	November 2019
Mary Faherty	November 2019
Robert Haughton	November 2019
Úna Ní Raifeartaigh	November 2019
Ann Power	November 2019
Donald Binchy	March 2020
Teresa Pilkington	September 2020
Nuala Butler	October 2022
Charles Meenan	July 2023
Tara Burns	July 2023
Brian O'Moore	October 2023
Michael MacGrath	July 2024
Niamh Hyland	July 2024
Anthony Collins	November 2024
Denis McDonald	November 2024

=== Ex officio members ===
Name	Since	Office
Donal O'Donnell	October 2021	Chief Justice of Ireland
David Barniville	July 2022	President of the High Court
