= List of presidential appointees to the Council of State (Ireland) =

The President of Ireland has the right to appoint a maximum of seven members of the Council of State, which advises the President in exercising certain reserve powers. As well as the seven (or fewer) appointees, the Council has seven ex officio members and a variable number of life members by right of former office. An appointed member's term ends not at the end of that Presidential term, but rather at the beginning of the next one, which will be some weeks later if the previous President has died or resigned. A new or re-elected President may re-appoint members. If an appointed member accedes to one of the positions conferring ex officio membership of the Council, this creates a vacancy which the President may fill via another appointment.

== History ==
The first President, Douglas Hyde, who took office in 1938, did not nominate members till the Council first met in January 1940; all six nominees were Oireachtas members, and not members of the Fianna Fáil government party.

For long, Presidents included senior serving politicians on the Council. Éamon de Valera said during the 1937 debate on the proposed Constitution, "this Council of State ... will ordinarily contain the leaders of the big Parties in the Dáil." Upon Richard Mulcahy's 1971 death, de Valera invited Fine Gael leader Liam Cosgrave to join but Cosgrave declined. Fine Gael objected in 1991 that Mary Robinson had become the first President not to have the Leader of the Opposition in the Council. Robinson had promised to appoint two representatives of the Opposition, but the practice of including the Leader was not a fixed rule. In early 1995, after the Fianna Fáil-led government was replaced by a Fine Gael-led government without a general election, Mary Robinson asked Monica Barnes of Fine Gael to resign from the council of state to allow Mary O'Rourke of Fianna Fáil to be appointed instead to increase the Opposition voice. The Oireachtas Committee on the Constitution issued a 1998 report dealing with the Presidency, which recommended that the President be "empowered to nominate two members of the Dáil who belong to parties other than the party or parties that form the government for the life of that government".

Early Presidents included one or two representatives of minorities; there were several of Anglo-Irish, Protestant, or ex-Unionist backgrounds, and the Jewish Bob Briscoe. In campaigning in the 1990 presidential election, Mary Robinson promised to reform the Council of State. She criticised it for consisting "mainly of senior or retired politicians" and promised to make it "truly representative of the community as a whole". Prior to 1990, Presidents generally reappointed members from the previous term; new members were appointed only when a vacancy arose by a previous appointee's death or accession to ex-officio membership. Patrick Hillery considered new appointees upon assuming office in 1976, and was advised there was no precedent for informing former Councillors of their exclusion; Hillery decided "it would be too hurtful to drop any of the members". Robinson abandoned this practice by appointing seven new members; Mary McAleese did likewise at both her first and second terms. Michael D. Higgins appointed six first-timers and Catherine McGuinness, who had served under Patrick Hillery. For his second term he appointed seven first-timers.

During the 2011 presidential election campaign, candidate Mary Davis, best known for her Special Olympics activism, pledged to nominate a person with intellectual disability to the Council. This proposal attracted some criticism as tokenism, but was endorsed by Fergus Finlay. During a debate on The Late Late Show, candidates were later asked whether they thought Denis O'Brien would be "a suitable person to be on the Council of State". After the victory of Labour Party candidate Michael D. Higgins, the party denied that its leader Eamon Gilmore had suggested nominees to Higgins.

== List ==
Appointee	Term (Note: For example, a value of 3 indicates that the relevant term was the 3rd time the person had been appointed by a President to the Council of State. (A few were ex-officio members of the council on other occasions, which are not included in this count.))	President appointing	Date appointed	Date ceased	Role on appointment; notes	Sources
James Dillon	1	Douglas Hyde	8 January 1940	25 June 1945?	TD, initially for Fine Gael, later Independent	
Robert Farnan	1	Douglas Hyde	8 January 1940	25 June 1945?	Senator nominated by the Taoiseach	
John Keane	1	Douglas Hyde	8 January 1940	25 June 1945?	Independent Senator. Anglo-Irish Baronet.	
Richard Mulcahy	1	Douglas Hyde	8 January 1940	25 June 1945?	Fine Gael TD	
William Norton	1	Douglas Hyde	8 January 1940	25 June 1945?	Labour Party leader	
Michael Tierney	1	Douglas Hyde	8 January 1940	1944	Independent Senator and University College Dublin professor of Greek	
Joseph Blowick	1	Seán T. O'Kelly	22 August 1946	25 June 1952?	Clann na Talmhan leader	
Bernard Forbes	1	Seán T. O'Kelly	22 August 1946	10 September 1948	Anglo-Irish, 8th Earl of Granard. Died in office.	
Richard Mulcahy	2	Seán T. O'Kelly	22 August 1946	25 June 1952?	Leader of the Opposition	
Robert Farnan	2	Seán T. O'Kelly	22 August 1946	25 June 1952?		
Thomas Foran	1	Seán T. O'Kelly	22 August 1946	18 March 1951	Senator nominated by the Taoiseach. Died in office.	
John Keane	2	Seán T. O'Kelly	22 August 1946	25 June 1952?		
William Norton	2	Seán T. O'Kelly	22 August 1946	18 February 1948	Tánaiste, and ex officio member of the Council, after the 1948 general election.	
Seán MacEntee	1	Seán T. O'Kelly	1948	25 June 1952?	Fianna Fáil minister.	
Robert Farnan	3	Seán T. O'Kelly	March 1953	25 June 1959		
John Keane	3	Seán T. O'Kelly	March 1953	30 January 1956	Died in office	
Seán MacEntee	2	Seán T. O'Kelly	March 1953	23 June 1959	Made Tánaiste, and ex officio member of the Council, the day before O'Kelly's term expired	
Richard Mulcahy	3	Seán T. O'Kelly	March 1953	25 June 1959		
William Norton	3	Seán T. O'Kelly	March 1953	2 June 1954	Tánaiste, and ex officio member of the Council, in the 1954–57 government.	
Cecil Stafford-King-Harman	1	Seán T. O'Kelly	1956	25 June 1959	Anglo-Irish, grandson of Edward King-Harman; owned the Rockingham Estate, now Lough Key Forest Park	
William Norton	4	Seán T. O'Kelly	1957	25 June 1959	Tánaiste, and ex officio member of the Council, till after the 1957 general election.	
Patrick Little	1	Seán T. O'Kelly	July 1957	25 June 1959	Fianna Fáil TD	
Maurice E. Dockrell	1	Seán T. O'Kelly	1958?	25 June 1959	Anglo-Irish Fine Gael TD	
Maurice E. Dockrell	2	Éamon de Valera	23 September 1959	25 June 1966?		
Robert Farnan	4	Éamon de Valera	23 September 1959	7 January 1962	Died in office	
Patrick Little	2	Éamon de Valera	23 September 1959	16 May 1963	Died in office	
Richard Mulcahy	4	Éamon de Valera	23 September 1959	25 June 1966?		
William Norton	5	Éamon de Valera	23 September 1959	4 December 1963	Died in office	
Stephen M. O'Mara	1	Éamon de Valera	23 September 1959	11 November 1959	Former Mayor of Limerick. Died in office.	
Domhnall Ua Buachalla	1	Éamon de Valera	23 September 1959	30 October 1963	Former Governor-General of the Irish Free State. Died in office.	
James Dillon	2	Éamon de Valera	March 1960	25 June 1966?	Fine Gael Leader of the Opposition. Replaced Stephen O'Mara.	
Robert Briscoe	1	Éamon de Valera	1962	25 June 1966?	Jewish Fianna Fáil TD. Replaced Robert Farnan.	
Brendan Corish	1	Éamon de Valera	13 January 1964	25 June 1966?	Labour Party leader. Replaced William Norton.	
Honor Crowley	1	Éamon de Valera	13 January 1964	25 June 1966?	Fianna Fáil TD	
Jane Dowdall	1	Éamon de Valera	13 January 1964	25 June 1966?	Fianna Fáil former Senator and Lord Mayor of Cork	
Robert Briscoe	2	Éamon de Valera	13 January 1967	29 May 1969	Died in office	
Brendan Corish	2	Éamon de Valera	13 January 1967	14 March 1973	Became Tánaiste, and ex-officio member of the Council, after the 1973 general election.	
James Dillon	3	Éamon de Valera	13 January 1967	25 June 1973?		
Maurice E. Dockrell	3	Éamon de Valera	13 January 1967	25 June 1973?		
Jane Dowdall	2	Éamon de Valera	13 January 1967	25 June 1973?		
Richard Mulcahy	5	Éamon de Valera	13 January 1967	16 December 1971	Died in office	
Seán MacEntee	3	Éamon de Valera	16 February 1968	25 June 1973?		
Frank Aiken	1	Éamon de Valera	3 July 1969	25 June 1973?	Fianna Fáil TD. Tánaiste, and ex officio member of the Council, till after the 1969 general election. Replaced Bob Briscoe.	
Albert Joseph McConnell	1	Éamon de Valera	2 January 1973	25 June 1973?	Provost of Trinity College Dublin. Replaced Richard Mulcahy.	
Barry Desmond	1	Éamon de Valera	11 April 1973	25 June 1973	Labour Party minister. Replaced Brendan Corish.	
Frank Aiken	2	Erskine Childers	1973	19 December 1974		
Barry Desmond	2	Erskine Childers	1973	19 December 1974		
James Dillon	4	Erskine Childers	1973	19 December 1974		
Maurice E. Dockrell	4	Erskine Childers	1973	19 December 1974		
Jane Dowdall	3	Erskine Childers	1973	19 December 1974	Died on 12 December 1974, before the newly elected President Cearbhall Ó Dálaigh had appointed nominees to the Council.	
Seán MacEntee	4	Erskine Childers	1973	19 December 1974		
Albert Joseph McConnell	2	Erskine Childers	1973	19 December 1974		
Frank Aiken	3	Cearbhall Ó Dálaigh	2 January 1975	3 December 1976		
Barry Desmond	3	Cearbhall Ó Dálaigh	2 January 1975	3 December 1976		
James Dillon	5	Cearbhall Ó Dálaigh	2 January 1975	3 December 1976		
Maurice E. Dockrell	5	Cearbhall Ó Dálaigh	2 January 1975	3 December 1976		
Seán MacEntee	5	Cearbhall Ó Dálaigh	2 January 1975	3 December 1976		
Albert Joseph McConnell	3	Cearbhall Ó Dálaigh	2 January 1975	3 December 1976		
Siobhán McKenna	1	Cearbhall Ó Dálaigh	2 January 1975	3 December 1976	Actress. Replaced Jane Dowdall.	
Frank Aiken	4	Patrick Hillery	24 March 1977	19 May 1983	Died in office	
Barry Desmond	4	Patrick Hillery	24 March 1977	3 December 1983		
James Dillon	6	Patrick Hillery	24 March 1977	3 December 1983		
Maurice E. Dockrell	6	Patrick Hillery	24 March 1977	3 December 1983		
Seán MacEntee	6	Patrick Hillery	24 March 1977	3 December 1983		
Albert Joseph McConnell	4	Patrick Hillery	24 March 1977	3 December 1983		
Siobhán McKenna	2	Patrick Hillery	24 March 1977	3 December 1983		
Máirín Bean Uí Dhálaigh	1	Patrick Hillery	June 1983	3 December 1983	Widow of President Cearbhall Ó Dálaigh. Replaced Frank Aiken.	
Barry Desmond	5	Patrick Hillery	16 December 1983	3 December 1990		
James Dillon	7	Patrick Hillery	16 December 1983	10 February 1986	Died in office	
Maurice E. Dockrell	7	Patrick Hillery	16 December 1983	9 December 1986	Died in office	
Seán MacEntee	7	Patrick Hillery	16 December 1983	10 January 1984	Died in office	
Albert Joseph McConnell	5	Patrick Hillery	16 December 1983	3 December 1990		
Siobhán McKenna	3	Patrick Hillery	16 December 1983	16 November 1986	Died in office	
Máirín Bean Uí Dhálaigh	2	Patrick Hillery	16 December 1983	3 December 1990		
Pádraig Faulkner	1	Patrick Hillery	1984	3 December 1990	Former Fianna Fáil minister and Ceann Comhairle. Replaced Seán MacEntee.	
Alan Dukes	1	Patrick Hillery	2 May 1988	3 December 1990	Fine Gael leader of the Opposition	
Catherine McGuinness	1	Patrick Hillery	2 May 1988	3 December 1990	Barrister and former Independent Senator	
Gemma Hussey	1	Patrick Hillery	8 September 1989	3 December 1990	Fine Gael TD	
Monica Barnes	1	Mary Robinson	20 February 1991	April 1995	Fine Gael TD. Resigned to make way for Mary O'Rourke.	
Emer Colleran	1	Mary Robinson	20 February 1991	11 November 1997	An Taisce	
Patricia O'Donovan	1	Mary Robinson	20 February 1991	11 November 1997	Trade union barrister	
Quintin Oliver	1	Mary Robinson	20 February 1991	11 November 1997	Director of the Northern Ireland Council for Voluntary Action	
Rosemarie Smith	1	Mary Robinson	20 February 1991	11 November 1997	Irish Farmers' Association official	
Donal Toolan	1	Mary Robinson	20 February 1991	11 November 1997	Disabled journalist	
T. K. Whitaker	1	Mary Robinson	20 February 1991	11 November 1997	Former civil servant and Senator	
Mary O'Rourke	1	Mary Robinson	April 1995	11 November 1997	Fianna Fáil TD. Replaced Monica Barnes.	
Gordon Brett	1	Mary McAleese	16 December 1997	11 November 2004	Psychologist	
Brian Crowley	1	Mary McAleese	16 December 1997	11 November 2004	Fianna Fáil MEP	
Christina Carney Flynn	1	Mary McAleese	16 December 1997	11 November 2004	Irish Municipal, Public and Civil Trade Union official	
Ruth Curtis	1	Mary McAleese	16 December 1997	11 November 2004	NUI Galway psychology professor	
Stanislaus Kennedy	1	Mary McAleese	16 December 1997	11 November 2004	Nun, Focus Ireland campaigner	
Martin Naughton	1	Mary McAleese	16 December 1997	11 November 2004	Businessman	
Noel Stewart	1	Mary McAleese	16 December 1997	11 November 2004	Belfast accountant	
Harvey Bicker	1	Mary McAleese	22 November 2004	11 November 2011	Former British Army colonel and Ulster Unionist Party councillor	
Anastasia Crickley	1	Mary McAleese	22 November 2004	11 November 2011	Chair of the National Consultative Committee on Racism and Interculturalism	
Mary Davis	1	Mary McAleese	22 November 2004	11 November 2011	Special Olympics activist	
Martin Mansergh	1	Mary McAleese	22 November 2004	11 November 2011	Fianna Fáil Senator	
Enda Marren	1	Mary McAleese	22 November 2004	11 November 2011	Fine Gael activist	
Denis Moloney	1	Mary McAleese	22 November 2004	11 November 2011	Northern Irish lawyer	
Daráine Mulvihill	1	Mary McAleese	22 November 2004	11 November 2011	Meningitis survivor	
Michael Farrell	1	Michael D. Higgins	6 January 2012	11 November 2018	Solicitor and human/civil rights campaigner	
Deirdre Heenan	1	Michael D. Higgins	6 January 2012	11 November 2018	Provost and Dean of Academic Development, Magee College, University of Ulster	
Catherine McGuinness	2	Michael D. Higgins	6 January 2012	11 November 2018	Former Senator, Supreme Court judge and President, Law Reform Commission	
Ruairí McKiernan	1	Michael D. Higgins	6 January 2012	11 November 2018	Community activist; Social entrepreneur; founder SpunOut.ie	
Sally Mulready	1	Michael D. Higgins	6 January 2012	11 November 2018	Hackney borough councillor and advocate for Irish people in Great Britain	
Gearóid Ó Tuathaigh	1	Michael D. Higgins	6 January 2012	11 November 2018	Professor Emeritus, NUI Galway; Former Cathaoirleach, Údarás na Gaeltachta	
Gerard Quinn	1	Michael D. Higgins	6 January 2012	11 November 2018	Director, Centre for Disability Law and Policy, NUI Galway	
Cara Augustenborg	1	Michael D. Higgins	4 April 2019	11 November 2025	Fellow in environmental policy at University College Dublin	
Sinéad Burke	1	Michael D. Higgins	4 April 2019	11 November 2025	Disability activist	
Sindy Joyce	1	Michael D. Higgins	4 April 2019	11 November 2025	Irish Travellers' rights activist	
Maurice Malone	1	Michael D. Higgins	4 April 2019	11 November 2025	Chief executive of the Birmingham Irish Association	
Johnston McMaster	1	Michael D. Higgins	4 April 2019	11 November 2025	Methodist minister and academic at the Irish School of Ecumenics	
Mary Murphy	1	Michael D. Higgins	4 April 2019	11 November 2025	Social policy academic at NUI Maynooth	
Seán Ó Cuirreáin	1	Michael D. Higgins	4 April 2019	11 November 2025	Journalist and former Coimisinéir Teanga	
Fionnuala Ní Aoláin	1	Catherine Connolly	31 March 2026		Human Rights Lawyer	
Linda Ervine	1	Catherine Connolly	31 March 2026		Cross Community Activist	
Colin Harvey	1	Catherine Connolly	31 March 2026		Professor of Law, Queen's University, Belfast	
Kathleen Lynch	1	Catherine Connolly	31 March 2026		Sociologist, activist and professor emeritus of equality studies at University College Dublin	
Donncha O'Connell	1	Catherine Connolly	31 March 2026		Established Professor of Law in the School of Law, University of Galway	
Conor O'Mahony	1	Catherine Connolly	31 March 2026		Professor of Law, University College Cork, former Special Rapporteur on Child Protection	
Ciarán Ó hÓgartaigh	1	Catherine Connolly	31 March 2026		former President of University of Galway	

== See also ==
- Nominated members of Seanad Éireann, nominated by the Taoiseach

== Sources ==
- UCDA [UCD Archives] (2012). "P205: Papers of Dr Patrick Hillery; Descriptive Catalogue" (PDF).
