= Insurrection (TV series) =

Irish documentary drama about the 1916 Easter Rising

- Genre: Documentary drama
- Written by: Hugh Leonard
- Directed by: Michael Garvey; Louis Lentin
- Narrated by: Ray McAnally
- Composer: A. J. Potter
- Country of origin: Ireland
- Original language: English
- No. of series: 1
- No. of episodes: 8

Production
- Producer: Louis Lentin
- Editors: Bob Hill; Michael Stoffer
- Camera setup: Tony Barry
- Running time: Eight 30-minute episodes

Original release
- Network: Telefís Éireann
- Release: 10 April – 17 April 1966

Insurrection is an Irish documentary drama portraying the 1916 Easter Rising. It was written by Hugh Leonard and directed by Michael Garvey and Louis Lentin. It was first broadcast on Telefís Éireann in Ireland on 10 April 1966, and later on the BBC in the United Kingdom, ABC in Australia, and several other European countries. Only one series of eight episodes was made, with each episode broadcast on consecutive nights. The series was repeated on 1 May 1966 when it was shown in its entirety, and again in 2016 during the centenary of the Rising.

The series portrays the 1916 Easter Rising which was mounted by Irish republicans to end British rule in Ireland and establish an independent Irish Republic. The events were reconstructed as they might have been seen on an Irish television service at the time. Ray McAnally acted as the studio anchor of a news programme that presented daily coverage of the Rising as it unfolded, with Telefís Éireann reporters broadcasting on-the-spot updates of the events and conducting interviews with key participants. Along with the key figures of the insurrection, the series also looked at the action in the General Post Office, Liberty Hall, and events like the Battle of Mount Street Bridge. Incidents outside Dublin such as the arrest of Roger Casement, the sinking of the so-called SS Aud, and the Battle of Ashbourne were introduced into the programmes as filmed news items of the day. McAnally interviewed guests in-studio and also used models and street maps to clarify details for viewers.

Insurrection received critical acclaim from television critics. Described in the RTV Guide as "undoubtedly the most difficult and ambitious project ever attempted by Irish television", the series formed the centrepiece of Telefís Éireann's 1916 golden jubilee commemoration. It was regarded as pioneering in its use of the outside broadcast unit to record drama on location and its presentation of an historical event in the style of modern television war reporting. This technique was borrowed from the 1964 BBC TV film Culloden.

On 8 March 2016, RTÉ announced that Insurrection would be rebroadcast as part of their 1916 centenary commemoration.

== Production ==
=== Development ===
In the summer of 1965, the director-general of Telefís Éireann, Kevin McCourt, selected a group of senior production and administrative staff to arrange a programme scheme for the 1966 golden jubilee of the Easter Rising. In addition to planning the outside broadcast coverage of public ceremonials, Telefís Éireann also intended to make programmes to give the historical background to the Rising. One of the early proposals - a commissioned drama based on the events of the Rising - was discussed but considered impractical on both technical and cost grounds. The view of the broadcasting authority was reportedly that all programming should place more emphasis on the surviving participants of the Rising, rather than a re-assessment by historians. After detailed revision by the producers’ group during August 1965, four main programme strands emerged. As part of these four strands, the programme planning committee returned to the previously rejected idea of an historical drama.

Hugh Leonard was commissioned to write the scripts and described his task as 'an invitation no writer in his senses could turn down; an opportunity to write a definitive television history of the most improbable insurrection of this or any other century.' Assisted by historian Kevin B. Nowlan, Leonard's script was heavily influenced by Max Caulfield's The Easter Rebellion, which had been published in 1964.

=== Location filming ===
Although Telefís Éireann was only four years old, the outside broadcast and film units had gained excellent experience in event coverage, notably during the visit of President John F. Kennedy to Ireland in 1963. In addition to event coverage, the outside broadcast unit was used in another way. At the time, filming drama was a slow and expensive process, but the outside broadcast unit staff developed a cost-effective and innovative method using electronic cameras to record drama on location. This practice had increased Telefís Éireann's drama output, taken pressure off scarce studio time and brought some Irish TV drama away from the traditional studio set - most notably The Riordans.

During November and December 1965 Michael Garvey directed several film sequences, including the sinking of the Aud at Banna Strand and the Battle of Ashbourne. Extras were provided by the Irish Defence Forces. Louis Lentin also filmed several sequences, beginning with the lancers’ charge in Sackville Street. Filming on O'Connell Street proved to be quite a challenge, not only due to the proliferation of contemporary signage, bus stops, TV aerials and cars, but also because of the large numbers of interested onlookers. Nearby householders were persuaded to remove rooftop TV aerials, change curtains that were too modern in design and hide garden ornaments.

=== Studio filming ===
When the film inserts were complete, work began in the studios. Unfortunately, by late 1965, several buildings in Dublin connected with 1916, such as Liberty Hall, the South Dublin Union and the Mendicity Institute, were gone or modified beyond recognition. So essential locations such as Clanwilliam House were recreated as studio sets. The GPO interior in Studio 1 was the largest set ever built by Telefís Éireann. The principal designer, Alpho O’Reilly, took great care in ensuring period detail of tunics, weapons, vehicles, furniture and other properties. He had even located the original 1916 GPO clock in a Board of Works store. For actors, crew and production staff this studio GPO was to prove a difficult work environment. The final scenes involved action, special effects and complicated camera plots, and at one point actors and crew had to work surrounded by smoke, explosions and a real fire. Army experts in explosives and armaments, in-house safety officers and professional firemen were constantly on duty.

== Episodes ==
No.	Title	Directed by	Written by	Original release date
1	"There will be no rising"	Louis Lentin & Michael Garvey	Hugh Leonard	10 April 1966
Sunday 23 April 1916: The programme opens with the television newsreader Maurice O'Doherty concluding a report on the Battle of Verdun before handing over to the studio presenter Ray McAnally for the week s special report. McAnally introduces reports on the sinking of the Aud, a notice in the day's newspapers cancelling the Irish Volunteer parades and an item on Sinn Féin. There is a report from Banna Strand where arms were found and a man arrested. McAnally interviews Sir Matthew Nathan, Under Secretary for Ireland, in studio who reveals that the man arrested was Sir Roger Casement. Reporter Pat Nolan interviews Professor Eoin Mac Neill at St. Enda's School and at his home. Thomas Clarke gives his reaction to the cancellation of the parade. Reporter Maurie Taylor interviews Lord Wimbourne at the Vice Regal Lodge who assures the audience that there will be no rising.
2	"We've put Emmet in the shade"	Louis Lentin & Michael Garvey	Hugh Leonard	11 April 1966
Monday 24 April 1916: The programme opens with the studio presenter Ray McAnally announcing that there has been a rising in Dublin. Reporters Maurie Taylor and Gerry Alexander describe the scene in Beresford Place where armed members of the Irish Citizen Army and the Irish Volunteers have gathered. James Connolly, Patrick Pearse and Joseph Plunkett lead the last battalion at Dublin Castle. Reporter Jim Mooney witnesses the shooting of a policeman The rebels march into Sackville Street.
3	"Law and self restraint"	Louis Lentin & Michael Garvey	Hugh Leonard	12 April 1966
Tuesday 25 April 1916: The studio presenter, Ray McAnally, reports on events of the second day of the rising Using a large street map and a sequence of still images. McAnally describes how volunteers ambushed members of the Georgius Rex unit. Section commander Malone of the Irish Volunteers is interviewed about the incident. Noblett's sweet shop is ransacked by looters. Francis Sheehy-Skeffington tries to prevent the looting.
4	"Two thousand Sherwood Foresters"	Louis Lentin & Michael Garvey	Hugh Leonard	13 April 1966
Wednesday 26 April 1916: This episode opens with citizens reading a proclamation posted on a wall and troops from the Sherwood Foresters disembarking from a ship. In studio, presenter Ray McAnally reports on the warm welcome the British troops received and how the admiralty gunboat the Helga bombed Liberty Hall. At Trinity College, a porter tells a reporter what he has seen since Monday. A priest tends to the wounded on the roof of the GPO. In studio, McAnally reports that an advanced party of the Sherwood Foresters has been attacked at Haddington Road. Action of soldiers coming under fire is shown. McAnally analyses the attack using a model.
5	"When we are all wiped out"	Louis Lentin & Michael Garvey	Hugh Leonard	14 April 1966
Thursday 27 April 1916: It is the fourth day of the Rising and the studio presenter, Ray McAnally, announces the death by firing squad of Francis Sheehy-Skeffington. Reporter Gerry Alexander interviews Captain Bowen Colthurst about the execution of Sheehy-Skeffington and two other journalists. In studio, Ray McAnally gives a report on conditions in the city. There is an interview with a business man, Jack O'Connor, at Howth golf course who is unable to get to his office because of the troubles. Maurie Taylor reports from inside the GPO where Lieutenant John Mahony, a British army medical officer, is held prisoner.
6	"Do you think we'll win?"	Louis Lentin & Michael Garvey	Hugh Leonard	15 April 1966
Friday 28 April 1916: The programme opens with Ray McAnally announcing the arrival of General Sir John Maxwell - the Commander in Chief of the British forces in Ireland. Reporter Pat Nolan interviews General Maxwell at Dublin Castle. In studio Ray McAnally reports on the burning buildings and introduces a report from the GPO. At the GPO, James Connolly orders his bed to be moved to the firing line and dictates a dispatch to Miss Carney. Commandant Pearse pays tribute to the members of Cumann na mBan as they evacuate the GPO. Miss Carney refuses to leave. Maurie Taylor interviews Pearse. In studio, Ray McAnally reports on shells causing the GPO to catch fire.
7	"Was there no other way?"	Louis Lentin & Michael Garvey	Hugh Leonard	16 April 1966
Saturday 29 April 1916: The programme opens with Ray McAnally in studio reporting on the events of the fifth day of the Rising. He explains how the military are closing in on the rebels. McAnally gives reports from the other sites of action around the city. General Maxwell comments on the deaths of civilians. In a house in Moore Street, Sean McLaughlin Robert and the other leaders discuss possible ways of getting beyond the military cordon and consider the potential loss of life. On witnessing civilians being shot, Pearse expresses his sadness.
8	"Nothing in heaven and earth"	Louis Lentin & Michael Garvey	Hugh Leonard	17 April 1966
Friday 12 May 1916: Ray McAnally reports from outside Kilmainham Gaol less than two weeks after the Easter Rising. Thirteen of the men who had been involved in the Rising have been executed and many others have been given jail sentences. James Connolly and Seán Mac Diarmada, the two remaining signatories of the Proclamation, are awaiting execution. At Dublin Castle, James Connolly is visited by his wife Lily and his daughter Nora. Outside Kilmainham Gaol, Ray McAnally gives a summary of the destruction and loss of life as a result of the Rising.

== Cast ==
=== Television crew ===
- Ray McAnally as studio co-ordinator
- Maurice O'Doherty as newscaster
- Gerry Alexander as location reporter
- Maurie Taylor as location reporter
- Patrick David Nolan as location reporter
- Jim Mooney as location reporter
- Paddy Bartishell as location reporter

=== Irish revolutionaries ===
- Eoin Ó Súilleabháin as Patrick Pearse
- Jim Norton as Tom Clarke
- Declan Harvey as Joseph Plunkett
- Ronnie Walsh as James Connolly
- Edward Byrne as Thomas MacDonagh
- Liam Devally as Éamonn Ceannt
- Pádraig Ó Gaora as Seán Mac Diarmada
- Gerry Sullivan as Michael Mallin
- Patrick Waldron as Willie Pearse
- Conor Farrington as Sir Roger Casement
- Eddie Golden as Eoin Mac Neill
- Kevin Flood as The O'Rahilly
- Joan O'Hara as Countess Markievicz
- Barry Cassin as Desmond FitzGerald
- Brendan Matthews as Francis Sheehy-Skeffington
- John O'Flynn as Thomas Ashe
- Eddie Doyle as Richard Mulcahy
- Joe Lynch as Cathal Brugha
- Michael McAuliffe as Michael Collins
- Michael Ryan as Michael Malone
- Michael Murray as Lieutenant Mahony
- Seán McCarthy as James Ryan
- Mike Murphy as Volunteer Officer
- Tom O'Rafferty as Volunteer
- Donal McCann as Volunteer
- John O'Shea as John McCarthy
- Sheelagh Cullen as Elizabeth O'Farrell
- Eithne Lydon as Winifred Carney
- Sabina Coyne as Julia Grenan
- Brian Waldron as Richard Murphy
- Tony Doyle as Patrick Doyle
- Pat Laffan as James Fox
- James Caffrey as George Reynolds
- Tom Samway as Volunteer
- Brendan Sullivan as Jimmy Doyle
- John Welsh as James Stephens
- Kevin McHugh as William Ronan
- Vincent Smith as John Joyce
- Niall O'Brien as James Walsh
- Anthony Hennigan as Thomas Walsh
- Vincent Dowling as Volunteer
- Julie Hamilton as Crone
- Séamus Forde as Stephen McKenna
- Robert McLernon as Adjutant Morgan
- Pádraig Fay as Coade

=== British soldiers ===
- Howard Marion-Crawford as General Sir John Maxwell
- Henry Comerford as Captain Bowen-Colthurst
- Peter Mayock as Second Lieutenant Chalmers
- Bill Skinner as Captain Pragnell
- John Franklyn as Colonel Fane
- Denis McCarthy as General Lowe
- Tom Ascough-Patterson as Lieutenant King
- Robert Carlisle Jnr. as air mechanic Pratt

=== British government officials ===
- Cecil Barror as Sir Matthew Nathan
- Aidan Grennell as Lord Wimbourne

=== Minor characters ===
- Fred Johnson as Trinity College porter
- Cecil Nash as old man
- Jack O'Connor as golfer
- Gerry Tierney as priest
- Ray Mackin as Staines
- Loretta Clarke as first looter
- Patricia Turner as second looter
- Brendan Cauldwell as drunk
- Anna Manahan as housewife
- Arthur O'Sullivan as Captain Purcell
- Pat Layde as Constable O'Brien
- P. J. Donohue as Fr. John Flanagan
- Lillian Rapple as woman
- Anne O'Dwyer as housewife
