= Charles Casey =

Charles Casey may refer to:

- Charles Casey (lawyer) (1895–1952), Irish lawyer and judge
- Charles P. Casey (born 1942), American organometallic chemist
- Charles Casey (American football) (born 1944), former American football player
