= Robert Farnan (physician) =

Irish politician and physician (1898–1962)

Senator
- In office 22 May 1957 – 14 December 1961
- In office 14 August 1951 – 22 July 1954
- In office 27 April 1938 – 21 April 1948
- Constituency: Nominated by the Taoiseach

Personal details
- Born: 1898 County Kildare, Ireland
- Died: 7 January 1962 (aged 63–64)
- Party: Fianna Fáil
- Spouse: Lora Farnan
- Children: 1
- Education: Royal University of Ireland

Robert P. Farnan (1898 – 7 January 1962) was a gynaecologist, farmer, and Senator from County Kildare in Ireland.

He was born at Batton, Castlemore, County Kildare and was educated at CBS Athy, Castleknock College and at the Royal University of Ireland. Farnan was Professor of midwifery in University College Dublin, and became first chairperson of the Medical Research Council of Ireland upon its establishment in 1937. He was also a gynaecologist to the Mater Hospital. He was successful and wealthy, owning houses in Merrion Square and Howth, a Cadillac and a Rolls-Royce, as well as Bolton Castle, a tower house and farm in Kildare, where he bred Aberdeen Angus bulls.

Éamon de Valera's son Terry wrote in 2006, "Perhaps of all my father’s friends and colleagues none were so close, nor had his trust as had Robert Farnan." Farnan's home was de Valera's first hideout in 1919 after his escape from Lincoln Gaol. He warned de Valera that his "external association" alternative to the Anglo-Irish Treaty was too subtle to persuade the public. In September 1922, his house was the venue for a meeting between de Valera and Richard Mulcahy which tried in vain to halt the Irish Civil War that the Treaty had started; it is mentioned in As I Was Going Down Sackville Street, Oliver St. John Gogarty's memoir of the time.

In 1926 he became a founder member of the Fianna Fáil party and in 1938 de Valera nominated him to the newly formed Seanad Éireann as one of his eleven Taoiseach's nominees to the Seanad. He would be appointed a Senator by each subsequent Fianna Fáil Taoiseach until 1961 when he retired from political life. De Valera, who received financial support from Farnan for a time, made him a director of The Irish Press newspaper since its foundation in 1932. President Douglas Hyde appointed Farnan as a member of the first Council of State in 1938. In 1953 he was appointed to the Council of State by President Seán T. O'Kelly and would serve on the Council until his death. He mentored Éamon de Valera, Jnr, who also became a gynaecologist.

After he retired from his medical career he had begun breeding Aberdeen Angus bulls. He won various prizes and was President of the National Aberdeen Angus Association from 1946 to 1960.

Farnan's first wife, Lora, died in 1938; they had no children. He remarried and had one child, Patrick, who became a Catholic priest. Robert Farnan bequeathed Bolton Castle to the Archdiocese of Dublin to establish a monastic community, which was done by Mount St. Joseph Abbey, Roscrea after 1965.
