= Cearbhall Ó Dálaigh =

President of Ireland from 1974 to 1976

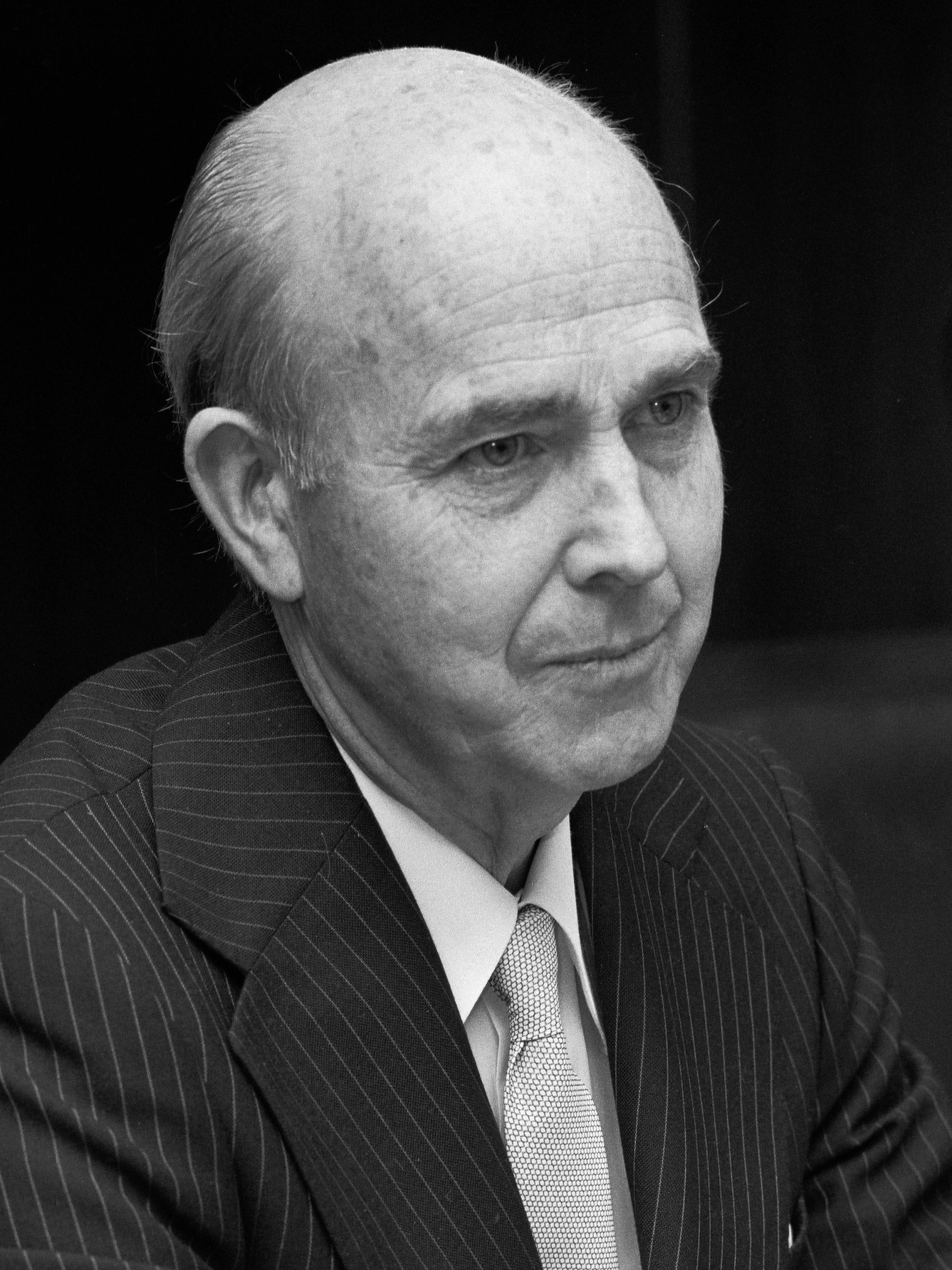
- Ó Dálaigh in 1975

President of Ireland
- In office 19 December 1974 – 22 October 1976
- Taoiseach: Liam Cosgrave
- Preceded by: Erskine H. Childers
- Succeeded by: Patrick Hillery

Judge of the European Court of Justice
- In office 10 March 1973 – 19 December 1974
- Nominated by: Government of Ireland
- Appointed by: European Council

Chief Justice of Ireland
- In office 16 June 1961 – 22 September 1973
- Nominated by: Government of Ireland
- Appointed by: Éamon de Valera
- Preceded by: Conor Maguire
- Succeeded by: William FitzGerald

Judge of the Supreme Court
- In office 3 November 1953 – 22 September 1973
- Nominated by: Government of Ireland
- Appointed by: Seán T. O'Kelly

Attorney General of Ireland
- In office 14 June 1951 – 11 July 1953
- Taoiseach: Éamon de Valera
- Preceded by: Charles Casey
- Succeeded by: Thomas Teevan
- In office 30 April 1946 – 18 February 1948
- Taoiseach: Éamon de Valera
- Preceded by: Kevin Dixon
- Succeeded by: Cecil Lavery

Personal details
- Born: Carroll O'Daly; 12 February 1911 Bray, County Wicklow, Ireland
- Died: 21 March 1978 (aged 67) Sneem, County Kerry, Ireland
- Resting place: Sneem, County Kerry, Ireland
- Party: Fianna Fáil
- Spouse: Máirín Nic Dhiarmada (m. 1934)
- Education: University College Dublin; King's Inns
- Profession: Barrister; Judge

Cearbhall Ó Dálaigh (Note: Irish pronunciation: [ˈcaɾˠ(ə)wəl̪ˠ oː ˈd̪ˠaːlˠə]) (born Carroll O'Daly; 12 February 1911 – 21 March 1978) was an Irish barrister, judge and Fianna Fáil politician who served as the president of Ireland from December 1974 to October 1976. Following a breakdown in relations with the government intensified by remarks made by a senior minister, he was the first president of Ireland to resign from office.

A trained barrister and accomplished scholar of Irish literature and language, Ó Dálaigh became Éamon de Valera's protégé in the 1930s. He was appointed Attorney General in 1946 and a Supreme Court justice in 1953, the youngest-ever holder of either position at the time. He was promoted to Chief Justice of Ireland in 1961, and presided over a period of greater assertiveness on the part of the Irish judiciary. In 1973, he became the first Irish judge to sit on the European Court of Justice.

Ó Dálaigh became President of Ireland unexpectedly following the death of Erskine Childers. Growing conflict with the National Coalition government spilled out into open acrimony following hostile comments by defence minister Paddy Donegan. This led to Ó Dálaigh's resignation after twenty-two months in office. His departure and the circumstances around it remain a subject of controversy.

== Early life ==
Carroll O'Daly, the second of four children, was born on 12 February 1911, in Bray, County Wicklow. His father, Richard O'Daly, was the manager of a fish shop. His mother was Úna Thornton, an Irish speaker, cultural nationalist and member of Inghinidhe na hÉireann. His uncle, Joe Thornton, was a participant in the Battle of Ashbourne during the Easter Rising. Ó Dálaigh used the English form of his name during his legal career and it sometimes appeared in overseas publications during his presidency.

Ó Dálaigh had an elder brother, Aonghus, and two younger sisters, Úna and Nuala. He went to St. Cronan's Boys National School and Scoil na Leanbh in Ring, County Waterford. Following the death of his father when Ó Dálaigh was nine years old, his family moved to Dublin and he studied at Synge Street CBS. At Synge Street, Aonghus and Cearbhall were proficient Irish speakers and supporters of Irish culture, reportedly wearing "saffron kilts, saffron shawls and black tunics" to school.

While attending University College Dublin, Ó Dálaigh served as auditor of An Cumann Gaelach and the Literary and Historical Society. He claimed that his election as Auditor of the L&H was arranged by a fellow student, Brian O'Nolan, who agreed with his support for the rights of hecklers. He graduated with a B.A. in Celtic Studies in 1931, having studied under Douglas Hyde.

He served as Irish language editor of The Irish Press, a newspaper then owned by Éamon de Valera, from 1931 to 1940. Ó Dálaigh became a protégé of de Valera, due to their shared passion for the Irish language, and he was regarded internationally as an expert on Irish-language literature. Ó Dálaigh's brother Aonghus also worked at the Irish Press, serving as the newspaper's librarian until his death in 1967.

In 1934, Ó Dálaigh married Máirín Nic Dhiarmada, a fellow student at UCD he had come to know through the Literary and Historical Society, Conradh na Gaeilge and the hillwalking club. They had no children.

== Legal and political career ==
Ó Dálaigh was conferred with the degree of barrister-at-law by King's Inns and called to the bar in 1934, becoming a senior counsel in 1944. Although his performance as a barrister made little impact, he was active in politics, serving on Fianna Fáil's National Executive in the 1930s.

Following the appointment of Kevin Dixon as a judge of the High Court in 1946, Ó Dalaigh was chosen by Éamon de Valera to replace him as Attorney General. Aged thirty-five, he was the youngest Attorney General in Irish history at that time. The nationalist periodical The Leader hailed Ó Dálaigh's appointment, saying: "He is a member of the first generation to grow to manhood under the Irish flag; and he is the kind of Irishman whom we may hope that political freedom and the process of cultural regeneration will ultimately produce in numbers."

As Attorney General, Ó Dálaigh advised the government that membership of the United Nations would compel Ireland to participate in war at the behest of the Security Council, a fact which conflicted with the role of Dáil Éireann in declaring war in the Constitution of Ireland. However, a Soviet veto of Irish membership rendered these concerns academic. In 1947, Ó Dálaigh also gave advice which ended the arrangement whereby wireless stations at Malin Head and Valentia Island were presumed to be under the control of the British Post Office, a provision of the Anglo-Irish Treaty which he said ceased to apply legally in 1938.

At the 1948 general election, he contested Dublin South-West as a Fianna Fáil candidate, but was eliminated on the ninth count. Fianna Fáil lost the election, with Ó Dalaigh leaving the position of Attorney General. In 1951, he was unsuccessful again in winning a Dáil seat, but Fianna Fáil returned to power and he was re-appointed as Attorney General, serving until 1953. During this period, Ó Dálaigh also contested two elections to Seanad Éireann without success.

== Judicial career ==
In 1953, aged 42, Ó Dálaigh was nominated by Éamon de Valera as the youngest-ever justice of the Supreme Court, and appointed by President Seán T. O'Kelly. Ronan Keane notes that although Ó Dálaigh had limited experience as a barrister, he was well-liked as a justice for his courtesy and respected for the clarity of his analysis. He also served on government commissions into taxation and higher education in the 1950s and 1960s.

While serving as a justice, Ó Dálaigh remained active in the arts community, serving as Chair of the Cultural Relations Committee, a body established by the Department of Foreign Affairs to promote Irish culture abroad. An urban legend suggests that Ó Dálaigh and his friend, the actor Cyril Cusack, picketed the Dublin launch of Disney's Darby O'Gill and the Little People in 1959, over the film's perceived stereotyping of Irish people. However, there is no known contemporary reference to this having occurred. He also served as vice president of the Dublin Theatre Festival during this period.

In 1961, he was appointed to replace Conor Maguire as Chief Justice of Ireland by President de Valera, on the nomination of Taoiseach Seán Lemass. The appointment was controversial in legal circles, especially with Ó Dálaigh's fellow justice Cecil Lavery, who believed that as the senior judge on the court, he should have been nominated. Seán Lemass observed that he hoped the appointment of Ó Dálaigh, and of 43-year-old Brian Walsh to replace him as an ordinary justice, would lead to the Irish Supreme Court taking on a more interventionist and liberal character, like its American counterpart.

Under Ó Dálaigh, the Supreme Court embarked on a new direction in the 1960s, seeking to uphold fundamental rights and showing more willingness to challenge the government than previously. In 1965, Ó Dálaigh issued a judgement confirming a High Court ruling stating that personal rights guaranteed by the constitution extended beyond those explicitly referred to in the text to include further "unenumerated rights", an act which dramatically widened the scope for the judiciary to challenge legislation. In State (Quinn) v. Ryan (1965) the court deemed unconstitutional an attempt by the Garda Síochána to extradite a citizen to Britain without first giving him the opportunity to challenge the decision. Ó Dálaigh declared:

It was not the intention of the Constitution in guaranteeing the fundamental rights of the citizen that these rights should be set at nought or circumvented. The intention was that rights of substance were being assured to the individual and that the Courts were the custodians of these rights. As a necessary corollary, it follows that no one can with impunity set these rights at nought or circumvent them, and the Courts’ powers in this regard are as ample as the defence of the Constitution requires.

During this period, the Supreme Court also prohibited the use of evidence obtained by unconstitutional means, forbade the detention of an accused person pending trial on the grounds that they might commit offences, and insisted that the judiciary and not the executive should decide whether evidence should be withheld from a court. In the 1971 case of Re Haughey, the Supreme Court under Ó Dálaigh ruled that the Dáil Public Accounts Committee had acted unconstitutionally by not using fair procedures while interrogating Jock Haughey, the brother of Charles Haughey, over alleged arms smuggling.

When Ireland joined the European Economic Community in 1973, Taoiseach Jack Lynch nominated Ó Dálaigh as Ireland's first judge on the European Court of Justice. Ó Dálaigh is reported to have said that he accepted the appointment because he believed he had been on the Supreme Court long enough, and was wary of the possibility that the executive might roll back some of his decisions. Ó Dálaigh, who spoke French and Italian in addition to Irish and English, adapted well to his posting in Luxembourg, though it turned out to be short lived.

== President of Ireland ==
The sudden death of President Erskine Hamilton Childers on 17 November 1974 created an unexpected vacancy, and a dilemma for the major political parties: after a general election and presidential election in 1973, they did not want the expense of another campaign. Four names were proposed by the National Coalition government as non-partisan replacements: Rita Childers, the widow of the late president; Con Cremin, former permanent representative at the United Nations; Donal Keenan, President of the Gaelic Athletic Association; and T. K. Whitaker, the governor of the Central Bank of Ireland. These proposals were rejected by the Fianna Fáil parliamentary party, who demanded that a member of their party be nominated to contest the election. After Jack Lynch and George Colley declined to stand, Fianna Fáil proposed Ó Dálaigh as a compromise candidate. On 30 November, Fianna Fáil, Fine Gael and Labour Party agreed to support him, effectively ensuring his election without a contest.

An Irish Independent editorial expressed disappointment at the lack of a popular mandate for the new president, but praised Ó Dálaigh for his breadth of interests outside the legal field, suggesting these made him a suitable head of state. The Irish Times echoed these sentiments, remarking that Ó Dálaigh's "personality has not been dehydrated by his profession". He was sworn in as president at Dublin Castle on 19 December 1974. His inauguration was attended by serving politicians from the government and opposition, former president de Valera and former Taoiseach John A. Costello, religious figures and various others, including Seán MacBride. In his inaugural address, he spoke in Irish, English and French, declaring:

The press, in recent days, have repeatedly asked me: 'What, Mr President-elect, is your policy going to be as President?' I have invariably answered – and, I think, correctly – that presidents, under the Irish Constitution, don't have policies. But perhaps a president can have a theme. If he can, then I have found the answer for my friends of the press. The theme of my septennat, más cead sin le Dia, will again be that of my early student days: Community Spirit. How sorely needed in part of this strife-torn island, with the new European dimension added, and, never forgetting, our brothers of the Third World.

In 1975, Ó Dálaigh became the first Common Market head of state to make an official visit to the European Commission headquarters in Brussels. Ó Dálaigh retained an interest in the arts as president: when Tom Murphy's play The Sanctuary Lamp had its first performance at the Abbey Theatre in 1975, the audience objected to its depiction of the clergy. Ó Dálaigh, who had been in the audience, took to the stage after the performance to defend the playwright, calling the play "one of the great Irish dramas" and comparing it to The Playboy of the Western World and Juno and the Paycock. Ó Dálaigh, a polyglot and enthusiast for European culture, caused consternation to journalists covering his foreign visits due to his tendency to avoid using English.

Ó Dálaigh's presidency coincided with the death of Éamon de Valera in August 1975. He received telegrams of condolence from Pope Paul VI and Kurt Waldheim among others, and he and his wife attended de Valera's funeral at St Mary's Pro-Cathedral.

=== Resignation ===
Ó Dálaigh's background as an interventionist jurist brought him into conflict with a crisis-ridden government as president. The coalition under Liam Cosgrave faced high unemployment, rising inflation and a balance-of-payments deficit, and the state was under pressure from the British government to crack down on the Provisional IRA's activities south of the border. Relations between Ó Dálaigh and Cosgrave were strained due to a perceived failure to keep him "informed on matters of domestic and international policy" as per Article 28.5.2° of the Irish constitution.

On 21 July 1976, the British ambassador to Ireland, Christopher Ewart-Biggs, was assassinated outside his residence at Glencairn House by the IRA. In the aftermath, the government announced its intention to introduce legislation extending the maximum period of detention without charge from two to seven days. In late September 1976, Ó Dálaigh decided to exercise his constitutional prerogative to refer the Emergency Powers Bill to the Supreme Court to test its constitutionality. The government contended that the bill, as emergency legislation, should be immune from constitutional challenge. According to Donal Barrington, Ó Dálaigh objected to the government's use of the constitution's emergency powers to crack down on the IRA. He did not believe their armed campaign met the threshold of "an armed conflict in which the State was not a participant", a provision originally drafted to refer to the Second World War. After the referral, former British prime minister Edward Heath is reported to have called Ó Dálaigh a "menace to civilisation".

Two weeks later, the Supreme Court upheld the bill, but warned that if enforced loosely it could make "inroads into personal liberty". Ó Dálaigh signed it into law on 16 October 1976. Ronan Fanning observed in 2006 that Ó Dálaigh's private papers betrayed profound disagreement with the Supreme Court's decision, and that he had already begun drafting a resignation letter when the bill was upheld. In regard to one such draft, Fanning wrote: "The vehemence of his concern with the decision's supposed impact on 'the role of the President as protector of the Constitution' is suggestive of an inability to distinguish between his role and the Supreme Court's role as final arbiter of the meaning of the Constitution."

On the day the bill became law, an IRA bomb in a farmhouse at Garryhinch in County Offaly killed Michael Clerkin, a member of the Garda Síochána. Ó Dálaigh's actions in delaying the bill were seen by the government to have contributed to the killing of Clerkin. Two days later, Minister for Defence Paddy Donegan, visiting Columb Barracks in Mullingar to open a canteen, told a reporter covering the event for the Westmeath Examiner that the president was a "thundering disgrace" for sending the bill to the Supreme Court. Donegan's comments, a departure from his prepared script, quickly came to the attention of the national media.

Persistent claims arose afterwards that Donegan's outburst was more vulgar than the published version but the reporter, Don Lavery, denied this. In 2007, Richie Ryan, a cabinet colleague of Donegan's, suggested that his remarks had been influenced by alcohol, but Lavery wrote in the Irish Independent: "Donegan was not drunk. Sitting eight inches across from him I got no smell of drink off the minister, who was an alcoholic; he did not slur his words, and he did not stagger or sway."

At ten o'clock on the evening of the speech, Liam Cosgrave phoned Ó Dálaigh to inform him of Donegan's remarks, seeking to prevent his finding out through the press. Ó Dálaigh responded by saying: "This is not a matter which I consider I should discuss by telephone. I shall be quite happy to see you, Taoiseach, at any time." Donegan issued a public statement that evening expressing regret for the comments and requesting the opportunity to apologise to the president in person. Áras an Uachtaráin told Donegan that the president was unavailable for such a meeting.

The following day, Donegan wrote a letter to Ó Dálaigh, stating: "I wish to tender to you my very deep regret for my use of the words 'thundering disgrace' in relation to you. I repeat my expression of sincere and humble apology." Ó Dálaigh replied immediately, stating Donegan had "no understanding" of the damage caused by his comments, especially as they had been made to an audience of defence personnel whose commander-in-chief was the president. He continued: "A special relationship exists between the President and the Minister for Defence ... that relationship has been irreparably breached not only by what you said yesterday but also because of the place where, and the persons before whom, you chose to make your outrageous criticism." The tone of Ó Dálaigh's rebuke took the government by surprise. Donegan had offered to resign as minister, but Cosgrave refused to accept because he had expected the president to accept an apology.

On 21 October, Fianna Fáil called for Donegan's resignation. In the Dáil, Jack Lynch said: "It is with regret that I move this motion. I regret that the occasion has arisen at all. I regret that the Minister himself has not seen the gravity of the offence in such a way that he would tender his resignation." The Taoiseach responded: "The Minister had an apology delivered in writing which was full and unreserved." Cosgrave continued: "The Minister for Defence did not attack our institutions. He made what he and I regard as a serious comment on what the President did in a disrespectful way." Cosgrave then praised Donegan's general performance as defence minister.

Ó Dálaigh was outraged by what he perceived as the Taoiseach's siding with the minister over him. Despite a further letter of apology on 22 October, Ó Dálaigh tendered his resignation that day. In his resignation statement, he said leaving office was "the only way open to me to assert publicly my personal integrity and independence as President of Ireland and to protect the dignity and independence of the presidency as an institution".

Reporting on the resignation for The New York Times, journalist Liam Hourican observed that Ó Dálaigh's view of his role as head of state derived from his devoted study of the U.S. constitution and had some support from Irish legal experts, but that such an assertive presidency was without precedent in Ireland. Hourican also noted the irony that Ó Dálaigh, an accidental president, had been more active than his popularly elected predecessors. Speaking to RTÉ, Ó Dálaigh said he felt no "personal rancour" towards Donegan, that he would not stand for office again, and that he intended to retire to County Kerry. He was the first President of Ireland to resign from office, and was succeeded by Patrick Hillery.

== Retirement and death ==
Following his resignation, Ó Dálaigh and his wife moved to a house outside Sneem, County Kerry. In 1977, they visited China at the invitation of the Chinese government. Ó Dálaigh died suddenly of a heart attack on 21 March 1978, aged 67. He received a state funeral and was buried in Sneem. His widow, Máirín Uí Dhálaigh, died in 1994.

Speaking to the Sunday Independent in 2001, Garret FitzGerald, Minister for Foreign Affairs during Ó Dálaigh's presidency, said of him: "He was a very odd man, eccentric; totally unsuited to be president, but the media were fully behind him. And, of course, I don't condone what happened but I think he had had enough of it by then and was glad to go. I know his wife wasn't really happy in the job."

Speaking on his centenary in 2011, then-President Mary McAleese said:

History will be kind to Cearbhall Ó Dálaigh. He is entitled to that. Lawyers of my generation knew him to be a brave, cutting edge and inspiring jurist, an innovative and courageous leader just as the Irish people knew him as a man of simple decent honour, unfazed by personal position or privilege despite the many achievements which his brilliance had brought him. His life, in particular its penultimate chapter as President will no doubt remain a subject of debate, even heated debate. Those eventful two years as President were but a thin slice of the life of a man who when he took on the role at the age of 65 had behind him the kind of phenomenally successful career both nationally and internationally that comes along all too rarely.

== See also ==
- List of members of the European Court of Justice

== Notes ==
Legal offices
Preceded by Kevin Dixon	Attorney General of Ireland; 1946–1948	Succeeded by Cecil Lavery
Preceded by Charles Casey	Attorney General of Ireland; 1951–1953	Succeeded by Thomas Teevan
Preceded by Conor Maguire	Chief Justice of Ireland; 1961–1973	Succeeded by William FitzGerald
Political offices
Preceded by Erskine H. Childers	President of Ireland; 1974–1976	Succeeded by Patrick Hillery
