= Maeve Hillery =

Irish physician (1924–2015)

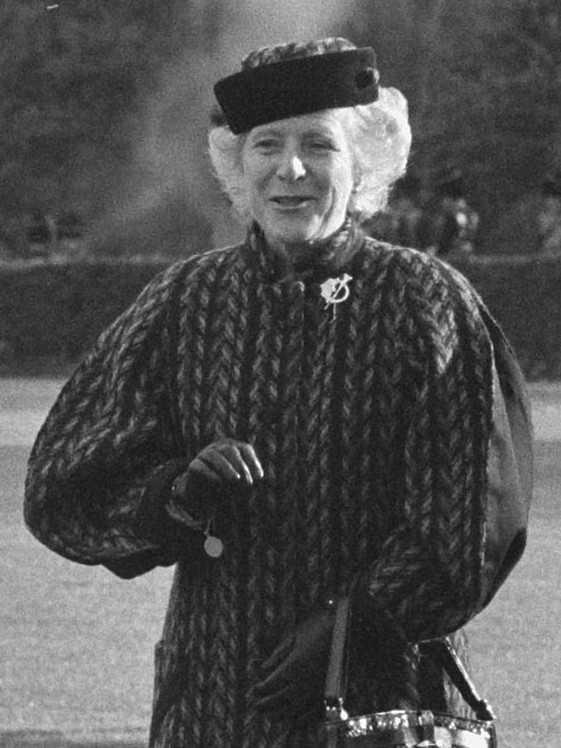
- Hillery in The Netherlands in 1986
- Born: Mary Beatrice Finnegan; 14 August 1924; Sheffield, Yorkshire, England
- Died: 10 January 2015 (aged 90); Blackrock, Dublin, Ireland
- Resting place: St. Fintan's Cemetery, Sutton, Dublin, Ireland
- Education: University College Galway; University College Dublin
- Spouse: Patrick Hillery (m. 1955–2008)
- Children: 2

Maeve Hillery (née Finnegan; 14 August 1924 – 10 January 2015) was an Irish anaesthetist who was the wife of the 6th President of Ireland, Patrick Hillery.

== Life and family ==
Mary Beatrice Finnegan was born on 14 August 1924 in Sheffield, Yorkshire. Her father was a builder from Galway, and her mother was half-Irish. Hillery would holiday in Ireland as a child, and, during World War II, she attended a boarding school in Galway for a year. She entered University College Galway (UCG), and qualified as a doctor. She then attended University College Dublin (UCD), where she studied to become an anaesthetist. It was here that she met her future husband, Patrick Hillery, who was also studying medicine. She worked in Jervis Street Hospital, St James' Hospital, and in Sheffield. The couple married on 27 October 1955. The Hillerys practised medicine together in Milltown Malbay while her husband was a TD. Together they had a son, John, and an adopted daughter, Vivienne. Vivienne died in 1987 from leukemia.

Hillery died in Dublin, on 10 January 2015. She was buried in St Fintan's Cemetery, Sutton.

== Career ==
Hillery's husband served in a number of political roles, including foreign minister and European Commissioner. After the completion of his term as a European Commissioner in 1976, he contemplated leaving politics and returning to medicine. Instead, Hillery was asked to become the sixth President of Ireland. The woollen cloak she worn to her husband's inauguration as president is now held in the collections of the National Museum of Ireland at Collins Barracks. She used a number of Irish designers during her 13 years in Áras an Uachtaráin, highlighting Irish design and materials.

During the few rare interviews Hillery gave she spoke about the enormous upkeep and maintenance the presidential residence required, its unsuitability as a family home, and undertook the restoration of parts of the house. Due to her husband's career, Hillery did give up practising medicine, but she undertook a course in public health at University of Louvain, and a diploma in child care. She maintained a particular interest in children's mental health, was part of a research committee at St Michael's House, and worked with Dr Victoria Coffey on her study of Down Syndrome. She also learnt Irish Sign Language.

Hillery served as the patron and president of a number of charities and voluntary groups including the Ana Liffey Drug Project, Care Alliance Ireland, Femscan, the National Association for the Mentally Handicapped, and the Association for Deaf Children. She was among a number of prominent Irish women who contributed recipes to a book, Welcome To Our Kitchen, which was produced by Femscan to raise money towards Ireland's first mobile breast cancer screening unit.
