= Nora Ashe =

Irish teacher, nationalist, and Irish language activist

- Born: Honora Ashe; 15 July 1882; Kinard, Lispole, County Kerry
- Died: 20 January 1970 (aged 87); Dublin, Ireland
- Education: Carysfort College
- Occupation: Teacher

Nora Ashe (15 July 1882 – 20 January 1970) was an Irish teacher, nationalist, and Irish language activist.

== Early life and family ==
Nora Ashe was born in Kinard, Lispole, County Kerry on 15 July 1882. She was the third daughter of the ten children of Gregory Ashe, a farmer, and Ellen (née Hanafin). Her parents were native, fluent Irish speakers, and while English was the language in the Ashe home, Ashe herself was bilingual. Her younger brother was Thomas Ashe. Due to their father's influence, all of the children were interested in Irish music, literature and history. Ashe attended the Loreto school in Killarney. She taught at the Kilrush Mercy convent school, before going on to attend Carysfort College, where she was taught by Éamon de Valera often conversing with him in Irish. After finishing her teaching training, she taught in Cappamore, County Limerick.

During the Easter Rising, Ashe was in Cappamore. Through her brother Thomas, she became a close acquaintance with Austin Stack, Seán Mac Diarmada, Michael Collins, and Sean O'Casey. While Thomas was imprisoned after the Rising in Ireland and then England, Ashe visited and wrote to him and a number of his colleagues, it was through her that Thomas kept in contact with his friends in Ireland. She brought him a message from Collins when he was in Lewes prison, also meeting with Stack and a number of other convicts. When Thomas returned to Kerry following his release in June 1917, she accompanied him. She would continue to visit him after he was imprisoned in Mountjoy Prison from late summer of 1917. When Thomas died on 27 September 1917 following a hunger strike, she wrote "it was the last thing we expected to hear." Ashe was the first of the Ashe family to arrive at the Mater Hospital, and was involved in the arrangement of a demonstration at Thomas' funeral.

== Career ==
She moved to Dublin to teach in the Central Model School in Marlborough Street. She went on to be appointed principal of Scoil Mhuire, staying in this post until she retired. From its foundation in 1926, Ashe was a member of Fianna Fáil, and on its national executive. She was involved with Conradh na Gaeilge for many years, attending their ard fheiseanna, and was a trustee of Choiste Gnótha from 1923 to 1941. She assisted in the foundation of the School Dramatic Society in 1934, sitting on the founding committee. Ashe spent a great deal of her time preserving the memory of her brother, particularly as a source of information on his life.

== Death ==
Ashe died in Dublin on 20 January 1970, and is buried in Straffan, County Kildare. Kerry County Library hold the Ashe family photographs, with some correspondence held in the National Library of Ireland.
