= Máirín Uí Dhálaigh =

Wife of the 5th President of Ireland

- Born: Mary MacDermott; 30 November 1908; Mussoorie, India
- Died: 25 January 1994 (aged 85); Sneem, County Kerry, Ireland
- Resting place: Sneem, County Kerry, Ireland
- Education: University College Dublin
- Spouse: Cearbhall Ó Dálaigh (m. 1934; died 1978)

Máirín Anne Uí Dhálaigh or Máirín O'Daly (née Nic Dhiarmada; 30 November 1908 – 25 January 1994) was a scholar of the Irish language and the wife of the 5th President of Ireland, Cearbhall Ó Dálaigh.

== Early life and education ==
She was the second of five children baptised as Mary but always known as Maureen in the family. Her father Lawrence MacDermott was from Dublin and her mother Victoria Louisa Bradley was from Tralee, County Kerry. She was born in Mussoorie, India, where her father was a professor and teacher with the Royal Munster Fusiliers. At age six she was sent to her father's sister in Tralee. She was educated at various schools in Dublin, and studied Latin and Irish in University College Dublin (UCD). While there in 1931, she gave an address on "Women in Irish life long ago" which Philip O'Leary described in 2004 as "unapologetically feminist". She worked as a teacher before completing a masters in Old Irish.

== Professional life ==
She joined the arts faculty at UCD, and later (from 1965 on) served on the governing body. For the Irish Texts Society, she edited Cath Maige Mucrama and produced a glossary and corrections for The Life of Aodh Ruadh Ó Domhnaill. She also contributed to the Royal Irish Academy's Dictionary of the Irish Language.

She got to know Cearbhall Ó Dálaigh at UCD, through the Literary and Historical Society, Conradh na Gaeilge and hillwalking club; in 1934, they were married. The couple had no children.

From 1979 to 1985, she served as a pro-chancellor of Trinity College Dublin. In 1985, she was also made an honorary fellow of Trinity College Dublin.

She donated her husband's extensive personal archive to UCD in two substantial donations in 1980 and 1981 opening up his public career of over four decades. In 1983, five years after her husband's death, she was appointed to the Council of State by his successor, President Patrick Hillery. Her last years were blighted by ill health. She is buried with her husband in Sneem, County Kerry.

== Sources ==
- Breathnach, Diarmuid; Ní Mhurchú, Máire. "Uí Dhalaigh, Máirín (c.1909–1994)". ainm.ie (in Irish). Cló Iar-Chonnacht.
