= Cecil Lavery =

Irish lawyer, judge and politician (1894–1967)

Judge of the Supreme Court
- In office 21 April 1950 – 6 August 1966
- Nominated by: Government of Ireland
- Appointed by: Seán T. O'Kelly

Attorney General of Ireland
- In office 19 February 1948 – 21 April 1950
- Taoiseach: John A. Costello
- Preceded by: Cearbhall Ó Dálaigh
- Succeeded by: Charles Casey

Senator
- In office 21 April 1948 – 21 April 1950
- Constituency: Cultural and Educational Panel

Teachta Dála
- In office June 1935 – June 1938
- Constituency: Dublin County

Personal details
- Born: 6 October 1894 Armagh, County Armagh, Ireland
- Died: 17 December 1967 (aged 73) Dublin, Ireland
- Party: Fine Gael
- Spouse: Louisa Ormsby (m. 1925)
- Children: 3
- Education: University College Dublin

Cecil Patrick Linton Lavery (6 October 1894 – 17 December 1967) was an Irish lawyer, judge and politician who served as a Judge of the Supreme Court from 1950 to 1966 and Attorney General of Ireland from 1948 to 1950. He served as a Teachta Dála (TD) for the Dublin County constituency from 1935 to 1938. He was also a Senator for the Cultural and Educational Panel from 1948 to 1950.

== Early life ==
Born at English Street in Armagh, Lavery was the son of Patrick Lavery, a solicitor, and Annie Rose (née Vallely). He was educated at St Patrick's School, Armagh, Castleknock College, Dublin; and later at University College Dublin (UCD), where he became one of the first auditors of the UCD Law Society. In 1927, he was appointed to set up a "Memorial Committee" by W. T. Cosgrave, President of the Irish Free State Executive Council in order to advance the process of the Irish National War Memorial Gardens where an impasse situation had evolved.

== Career ==
Lavery was elected to Dáil Éireann on his first attempt, at a by-election held on 17 June 1935 in the Dublin County constituency, after the death of Fine Gael TD Batt O'Connor. He was returned to the 9th Dáil at the 1937 general election, but the following year at the 1938 general election, he lost his seat to his Fine Gael running-mate Patrick Belton. Lavery had sympathetic views of fascism stating "Fascism has done much good in countries that have adopted it and may prove a satisfactory government for other countries in time to come”. Lavery was considered by the Directorate of Intelligence (G2), the Intelligence branch of the Irish Army, as a potential "Quisling" in the case of a Nazi invasion of Ireland.

He did not stand for election again until 1948, when he was elected to the 6th Seanad as a Senator for the Cultural and Educational Panel, and was appointed as Attorney General of Ireland by Taoiseach John A. Costello. Costello made two controversial decisions on Lavery's appointment; reversing the practice of many years he decided that Lavery could continue in private practice and that such fees as were paid to him as Attorney General should count as part of his income rather than be paid into the Exchequer. Costello justified both decisions on the ground that Lavery was one of the Bar's top earners and had taken a considerable pay cut as Attorney General. As Attorney General, he advised on several difficult issues, notably devaluation of the currency and fishing rights in Lough Foyle which were claimed by both Governments, North and South.

He left the Seanad on 21 April 1950, when he was appointed as a judge of the Supreme Court, where he served till his retirement in 1966. He was offered the presidency of the High Court but withdrew his name, apparently after the Department of Justice raised a question about his qualifications. In 1961, on the retirement of Conor Maguire, Costello lobbied hard for Lavery to be appointed Chief Justice of Ireland, calling him with perhaps some exaggeration "the outstanding Irish legal figure of the last half-century". He later lobbied, also unsuccessfully, for Lavery to be appointed a judge of the International Court of Justice (apparently the only time an Irish candidate was considered).

Legal offices
Preceded by Cearbhall Ó Dálaigh	Attorney General of Ireland; 1948–1950	Succeeded by Charles Casey

Dáil	Election	Deputy (Party)	Deputy (Party)	Deputy (Party)	Deputy (Party)	Deputy (Party)	Deputy (Party)	Deputy (Party)	Deputy (Party)
2nd	1921	Michael Derham (SF)	George Gavan Duffy (SF)	Séamus Dwyer (SF)	Desmond FitzGerald (SF)	Frank Lawless (SF)	Margaret Pearse (SF)	6 seats 1921–1923	
3rd	1922	Michael Derham (PT-SF)	George Gavan Duffy (PT-SF)	Thomas Johnson (Lab)	Desmond FitzGerald (PT-SF)	Darrell Figgis (Ind)	John Rooney (FP)	6 seats 1921–1923	
4th	1923	Michael Derham (CnaG)	Bryan Cooper (Ind)	Thomas Johnson (Lab)	Desmond FitzGerald (CnaG)	Darrell Figgis (Ind)	John Good (Ind)	Kathleen Lynn (Rep)	Kevin O'Higgins (CnaG)
4th	1924 by-election	Batt O'Connor (CnaG)	Bryan Cooper (Ind)	Thomas Johnson (Lab)	Desmond FitzGerald (CnaG)	Darrell Figgis (Ind)	John Good (Ind)	Kathleen Lynn (Rep)	Kevin O'Higgins (CnaG)
4th	1926 by-election	Batt O'Connor (CnaG)	Bryan Cooper (Ind)	Thomas Johnson (Lab)	Desmond FitzGerald (CnaG)	William Norton (Lab)	John Good (Ind)	Kathleen Lynn (Rep)	Kevin O'Higgins (CnaG)
5th	1927 (Jun)	Batt O'Connor (CnaG)	Bryan Cooper (Ind)	Thomas Johnson (Lab)	Desmond FitzGerald (CnaG)	Patrick Belton (FF)	John Good (Ind)	Seán MacEntee (FF)	Kevin O'Higgins (CnaG)
5th	1927 by-election	Batt O'Connor (CnaG)	Bryan Cooper (Ind)	Thomas Johnson (Lab)	Desmond FitzGerald (CnaG)	Patrick Belton (FF)	John Good (Ind)	Seán MacEntee (FF)	Gearóid O'Sullivan (CnaG)
6th	1927 (Sep)	Batt O'Connor (CnaG)	Bryan Cooper (CnaG)	Joseph Murphy (Ind)	Desmond FitzGerald (CnaG)	Seán Brady (FF)	John Good (Ind)	Seán MacEntee (FF)	Gearóid O'Sullivan (CnaG)
6th	1930 by-election	Batt O'Connor (CnaG)	Thomas Finlay (CnaG)	Joseph Murphy (Ind)	Desmond FitzGerald (CnaG)	Seán Brady (FF)	John Good (Ind)	Seán MacEntee (FF)	Gearóid O'Sullivan (CnaG)
7th	1932	Batt O'Connor (CnaG)	Thomas Finlay (CnaG)	Patrick Curran (Lab)	Henry Dockrell (CnaG)	Seán Brady (FF)	John Good (Ind)	Seán MacEntee (FF)	Gearóid O'Sullivan (CnaG)
8th	1933	Batt O'Connor (CnaG)	John A. Costello (CnaG)	Margaret Mary Pearse (FF)	Henry Dockrell (CnaG)	Seán Brady (FF)	John Good (Ind)	Seán MacEntee (FF)	Gearóid O'Sullivan (CnaG)
8th	1935 by-election	Cecil Lavery (FG)	John A. Costello (CnaG)	Margaret Mary Pearse (FF)	Henry Dockrell (CnaG)	Seán Brady (FF)	John Good (Ind)	Seán MacEntee (FF)	Gearóid O'Sullivan (CnaG)
9th	1937	Cecil Lavery (FG)	Henry Dockrell (FG)	Gerrard McGowan (Lab)	Patrick Fogarty (FF)	Seán Brady (FF)	5 seats 1937–1948		
10th	1938	Patrick Belton (FG)	Henry Dockrell (FG)	Thomas Mullen (FF)	Patrick Fogarty (FF)	Seán Brady (FF)	5 seats 1937–1948		
11th	1943	Liam Cosgrave (FG)	Henry Dockrell (FG)	James Tunney (Lab)	Patrick Fogarty (FF)	Seán Brady (FF)	5 seats 1937–1948		
12th	1944	Liam Cosgrave (FG)	Henry Dockrell (FG)	Patrick Burke (FF)	Patrick Fogarty (FF)	Seán Brady (FF)	5 seats 1937–1948		
12th	1947 by-election	Liam Cosgrave (FG)	Henry Dockrell (FG)	Patrick Burke (FF)	Seán MacBride (CnaP)	Seán Brady (FF)	5 seats 1937–1948		
13th	1948	Éamon Rooney (FG)	Seán Dunne (Lab)	Patrick Burke (FF)	3 seats 1948–1961				
14th	1951	Éamon Rooney (FG)	Seán Dunne (Lab)	Patrick Burke (FF)	3 seats 1948–1961				
15th	1954	Éamon Rooney (FG)	Seán Dunne (Lab)	Patrick Burke (FF)	3 seats 1948–1961				
16th	1957	Éamon Rooney (FG)	Kevin Boland (FF)	Patrick Burke (FF)	3 seats 1948–1961				
17th	1961	Éamon Rooney (FG)	Kevin Boland (FF)	Patrick Burke (FF)	Mark Clinton (FG)	Seán Dunne (Ind)	5 seats 1961–1969		
18th	1965	Des Foley (FF)	Kevin Boland (FF)	Patrick Burke (FF)	Mark Clinton (FG)	Seán Dunne (Lab)	5 seats 1961–1969		
19th	1969	Constituency abolished. See Dublin County North and Dublin County South							
