= Ruairí McKiernan =

Irish businessman (born 1977)

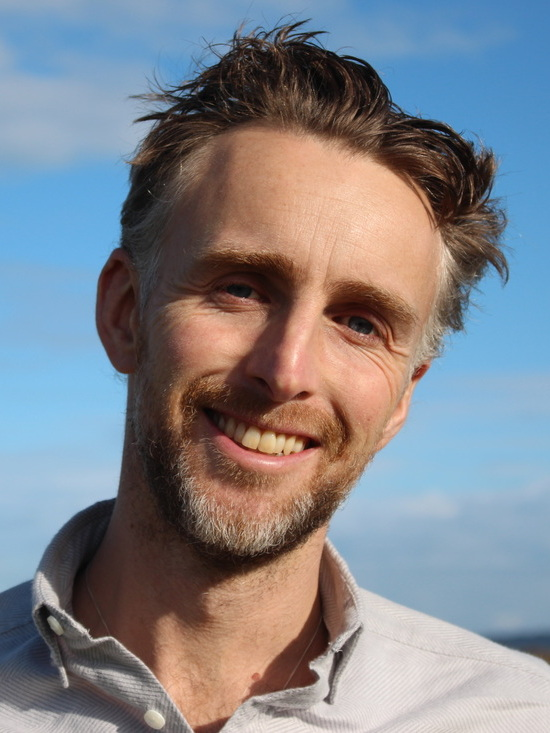
- Born: Cavan, Ireland
- Occupation: Social entrepreneur
- Awards: Fulbright scholar
- Website: www.ruairimckiernan.com

Ruairí McKiernan is an Irish author, social entrepreneur and campaigner on youth, community, health, and social justice issues. In 2012, he was appointed to the Irish Council of State by President Michael D. Higgins. He has been named by Ashoka as one of the top 10 people leading social change in Ireland. McKiernan is the author of the bestselling memoir Hitching for Hope, which was published in 2020 by US publisher Chelsea Green Publishing and reached number 1 in the Neilsen Bookscan and Irish Times paperback non-fiction charts.

McKiernan is the host of a chart-topping podcast called Love and Courage, which profiles leading thinkers and activists from around the world. Previous guests have included Christy Moore, Amanda Palmer, Peggy Seeger, Johann Hari, Stanislaus Kennedy, Ivor Browne, Frances Black, and Lynn Ruane.

Originally from Cootehill, County Cavan, Ireland, McKiernan founded the SpunOut.ie national youth organisation in Ballyshannon, County Donegal in 2004. He was CEO there until October 2011. McKiernan was a co-founder of the Possibilities civic engagement initiative, which hosted the Dalai Lama's 2011 visit to Ireland. He is also a co-founder of Uplift, a progressive civic action movement, a founding board member of the Soar Foundation, and part of the founding team behind the A Lust For Life mental health and wellbeing organisation. In 2013 he was awarded a Fulbright scholarship to undertake civic engagement research in Berkeley, California.

McKiernan received a BA with distinction in Business and Management with HR from the University of the West of Scotland and later worked as a youth worker, web designer, researcher, and community organiser.

He is the recipient of several awards including a Social Entrepreneurs Ireland award, an Irish Internet Association Net Visionary Award, and a Junior Chambers International Ireland award. In 2013 he was awarded a European Next Generation Leadership scholarship by the Korea Foundation.

McKiernan is a regular contributor to media outlets including the Irish Times, the Irish Independent, the Irish Examiner, RTÉ TV and radio, TV3, the BBC, and the Huffington Post. Media work has included an interview with Noam Chomsky and a video interview with Aaron Swartz that featured as part of the documentary The Internet's Own Boy.

McKiernan was involved as a board member of the We The Citizens initiative and was appointed by the Minister for Children and Youth Affairs to the voluntary board of Gaisce – The President's Award.

In 2013, he undertook a "Hitching for Hope" tour to listen to the voices and visions of the people of Ireland. In 2016, his "New Ireland Rising" video commemorating the 1916 Rising went viral online. In 2017, McKiernan helped organize a civil rights rally in the Riverside Church in New York. He is also one of the founders of the Gaelic Voices For Change movement that involves sports stars engaging on social issues, including homelessness.
