= Thomas Ashe =

Irish revolutionary and politician (1885–1917)

- Ashe in 1917

President of the Irish Republican Brotherhood
- In office 1916 – September 1917
- Preceded by: Denis McCullough
- Succeeded by: Seán McGarry

Personal details
- Born: 12 January 1885 Lispole, County Kerry, Ireland
- Died: 25 September 1917 (aged 32) Dublin, Ireland
- Education: De La Salle College Waterford

Military service
- Allegiance: Irish Republican Brotherhood; Irish Volunteers
- Years of service: 1913–1917
- Rank: Battalion Commander

Thomas Patrick Ashe (Irish: Tomás Pádraig Ághas; 12 January 1885 – 25 September 1917) was an Irish revolutionary and politician. He was a member of the Gaelic League, the Gaelic Athletic Association, the Irish Republican Brotherhood (IRB) and a founding member of the Irish Volunteers.

He was a senior commander in the Easter Rising of 1916. After release from prison just over a year later he was soon re-arrested on separate charges of sedition, and died as a result of forcible feeding whilst on hunger strike in prison.

== Background ==
Thomas Ashe was born in the townland of Kinard East, Lispole, Dingle, County Kerry, Ireland, to Gregory Ashe (d. 1927), a farmer, and his wife Ellen Hanifin, on 12 January 1885, according to his baptismal record and his sister Nora, or 15 March 1885, according to state birth records. His was a family of ten, seven boys and three girls. Thomas was the seventh child, with three brothers following him. His mother died aged 58, some years before Thomas died. Both Irish and English were spoken in their house, with Thomas's father being a great Irish Scholar and learners of Irish used to come to listen to his stories.

Having entered De La Salle Training College, Waterford, in 1905 he began his teaching career as principal of Corduff National School, Lusk, County Dublin, in 1908. He taught Irish in Corduff school. He was fond of the Irish language and started branches of the Gaelic League in Skerries and other neighbouring villages. According to his sister Nora he would get the children to march over a Union Jack. Ashe was a member of the Irish National Teachers Organisation.

He spent his last years before his death teaching children in Lusk, where he founded the award-winning Lusk Black Raven Pipe Band, as well as Round Towers Lusk Gaelic Athletic Association (GAA) Club, in 1906.

== Prior to the rising ==
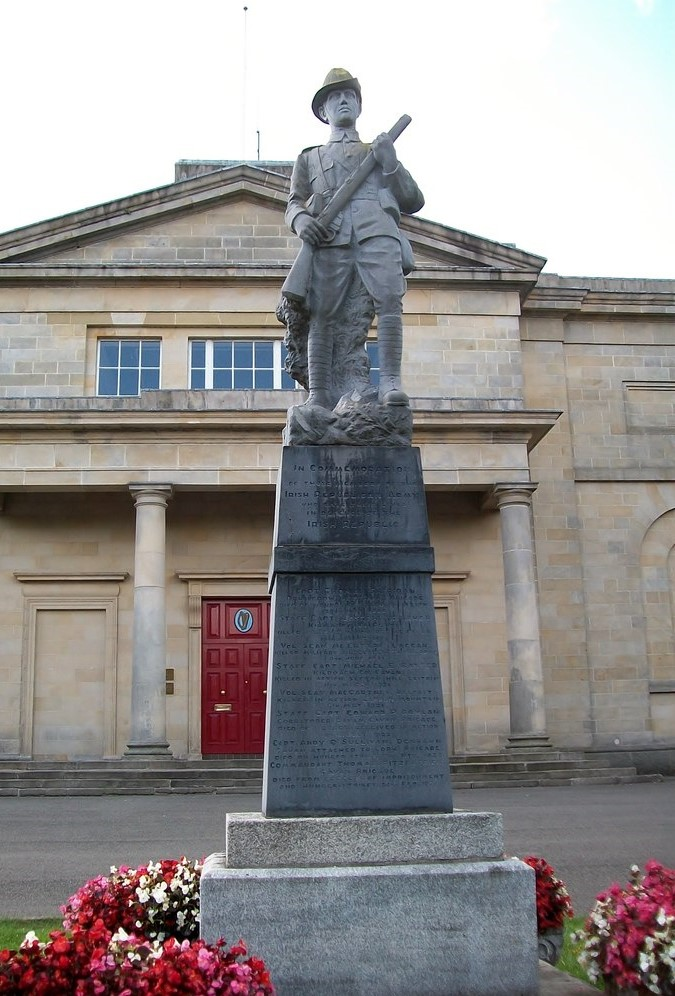
Thomas Ashe Memorial in Cavan

Ashe joined the Irish Volunteers upon its foundation in November 1913. He was a member of the Keating Branch of the Gaelic League and the Lusk company of the volunteers and probably founded it. He sat on the governing body of the Gaelic League, and collected considerable sums of money during a trip to the US in 1914 for both the Volunteers and the League.

Ashe supported the striking workers during the 1913 Dublin Lockout, saying "We are all here on Larkin's side. He’ll beat the hell out of the snobbish, mean, seoinín employers yet, and more power to him"

== Easter Rising ==
Commanding the Fingal battalion (5th battalion) of the Irish Volunteers, Ashe took a major part in the 1916 Easter Rising outside the capital city. Ashe was commandant of 5th battalion of the Dublin brigade; a force of 60–70 men engaged British forces around north County Dublin during the rising. Ashe was sent a messenger Mollie Adrian by Pearse with orders to hold the main road from Fairyhouse. She was sent back to report to Connolly, who returned an order to send 40 men to the GPO. Ashe was only able to send 20 due to his shortage of men.

He was to contact the 1st battalion at Cross Guns Bridge, although he found no one there because vice-commandant Piaras Beaslai knew nothing of this plan. The area was dominated by the central feature of Broadstone station, at the end of the line to Athlone, an important British army barracks. But for some reason they decided not to occupy and garrison the station; similarly the Citizens Army had been confusingly required to withdraw from Mallin. The lack of cooperative communication was later discussed in Piaras Beaslai's books, the research for which included taking accounts from Thomas Ashe whilst they were incarcerated. The failure of inexperienced volunteers to properly co-ordinate their deployments was a critical factor in defeat. Ashe himself had only been appointed commandant shortly before Easter. They were armed only with a few rounds, about a dozen service rifles, a dozen Mausers, and a dozen Martini carbines; some had only a shotgun against well-equipped army regulars.

On 28 April 1916 the battalion won a major victory at the Battle of Ashbourne, County Meath where they engaged a much larger force capturing a significant quantity of arms and up to 20 Royal Irish Constabulary (RIC) vehicles. Eleven RIC members, including County Inspector Alexander Gray, and two volunteers were killed during the five-and-a-half-hour battle. Twenty-four hours after the rising collapsed, Ashe's battalion surrendered on the orders of Patrick Pearse.

When he received the order to surrender he had his doubts as he had difficulty believing the rebels in Dublin had not had success as he did. He sent Richard Mulcahy to Dublin to verify its authenticity.

On 8 May 1916, Ashe and Éamon de Valera were court-martialled and both were sentenced to death. The sentences were commuted to penal servitude for life. Ashe was imprisoned in the Frongoch internment camp and Lewes Prison in England. While in prison he wrote the poem "Let Me Carry Your Cross for Ireland, Lord".

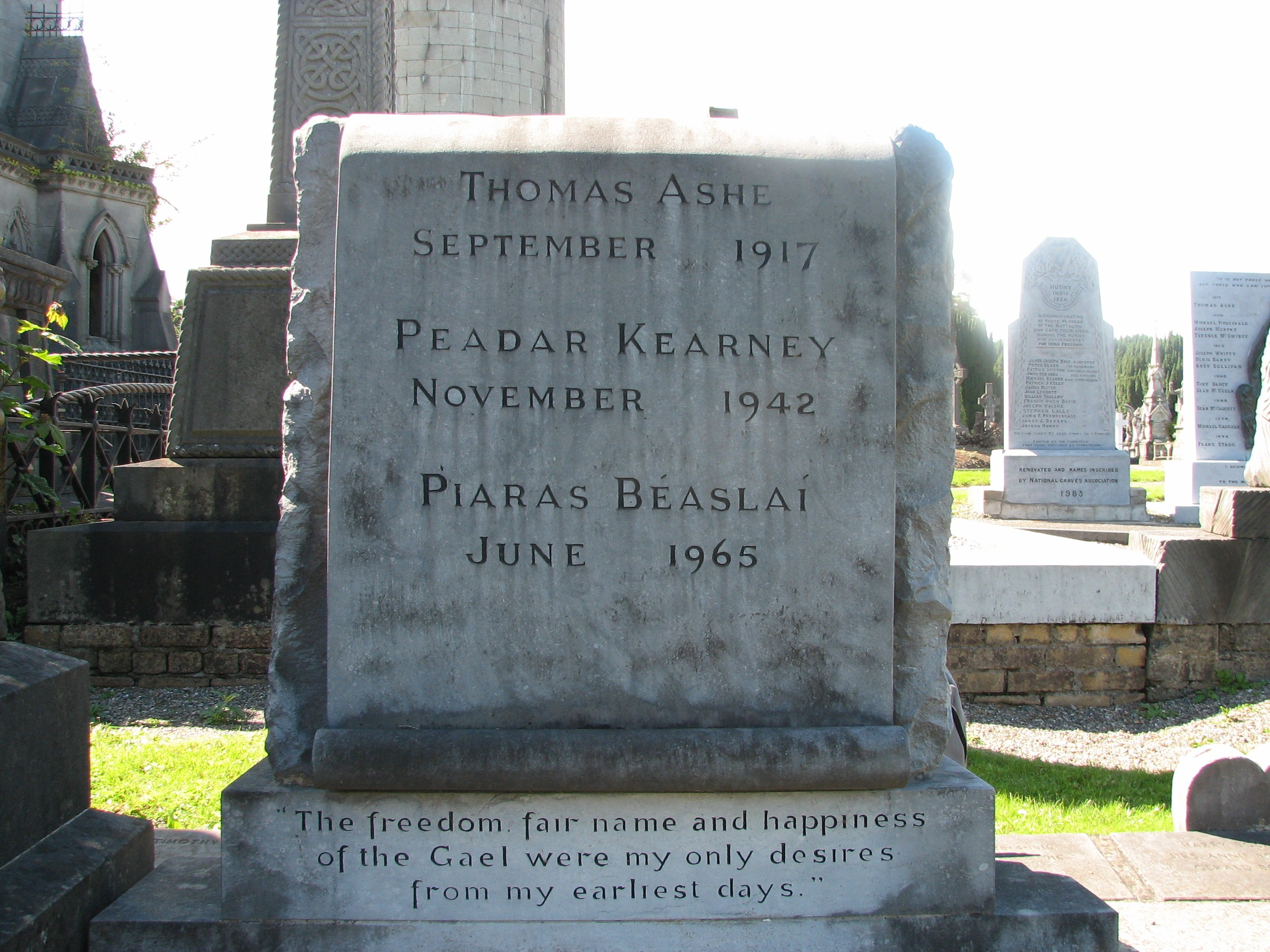
The gravestone of Thomas Ashe, Peadar Kearney and Piaras Béaslaí in Glasnevin Cemetery

With the entry of the US into World War I in April 1917, the British government was put under more pressure to solve the "Irish problem". De Valera, Ashe and Thomas Hunter led a prisoner hunger strike on 28 May 1917 to add to this pressure. With accounts of prison mistreatment appearing in the Irish press and mounting protests in Ireland, Ashe and the remaining prisoners were freed on 18 June 1917 by Lloyd George as part of a general amnesty.

== Death and legacy ==
Ashe was released from jail in June 1917 under the general amnesty which was given to republican prisoners. Upon release, Ashe returned to Ireland and began a series of speaking engagements. In August 1917, Ashe was arrested and charged with sedition for a speech that he made in Ballinalee, County Longford, where Michael Collins had also been speaking. He went on the run but was captured in Dublin and detained at the Curragh but was then transferred to Mountjoy Prison in Dublin.

He was convicted on the sedition charge and sentenced to two years hard labour. Ashe and other prisoners, including other Kerrymen Fionán Lynch and Austin Stack, demanded prisoner of war status. The Lord Mayor of Dublin Laurence O'Neill visited Ashe in prison and said Ashe asked for no privileges but refused to be treated as a criminal. As this protest evolved, Ashe again went on hunger strike on 20 September 1917. As this was a breach of prison discipline, the authorities retaliated by taking away the prisoners' beds, bedding and boots. After five or six days lying on a cold stone floor, the prisoners were subjected to forcible feeding.

On 25 September, Fionán Lynch saw Ashe being carried away to receive this treatment and called out to him, "Stick it Tom". Ashe called back, "I'll stick it, Fin". That was the last time they spoke to each other. Ashe was carried back, blue in the face and unconscious. He was removed to the Mater Misericordiae Hospital (which faces the prison), where he died within a few hours.

At the inquest into his death, the jury condemned the staff at the prison for the "inhuman and dangerous operation performed on the prisoner, and other acts of unfeeling and barbaric conduct". They concluded that Ashe had died of heart failure and congestion of the lungs, and that this was due to force-feeding combined with the previous removal of his bed and boots (which had left him in a physically weakened state).

The death of Ashe and the subsequent funeral procession had a striking effect on the attitude of the Irish people and became a rallying call to the standard of the Irish Republic. Ashe was given a military funeral and a volley of shots was fired over his coffin, following which Michael Collins declared "Nothing additional remains to be said, that volley which we have just heard is the only speech which it is proper to make above the grave of a dead Fenian". Though not on the scale of Jeremiah O'Donovan Rossa's funeral two years previous, the military aspect of the funeral proved that the Irish Volunteers were well on their way to being restored to pre-1916 levels.

Ashe's remains were removed to the Pro-Cathedral on Thursday evening and placed on a catafalque in the main entrance. Requiem Mass was celebrated by Fr. Michael O'Flanagan on Friday morning before removal to City Hall, where his body lay in state for two days. "Tom Ashe's body lay in state in the City Hall, dressed in his Volunteer Republican uniform, and 30,000 mourners filed by."

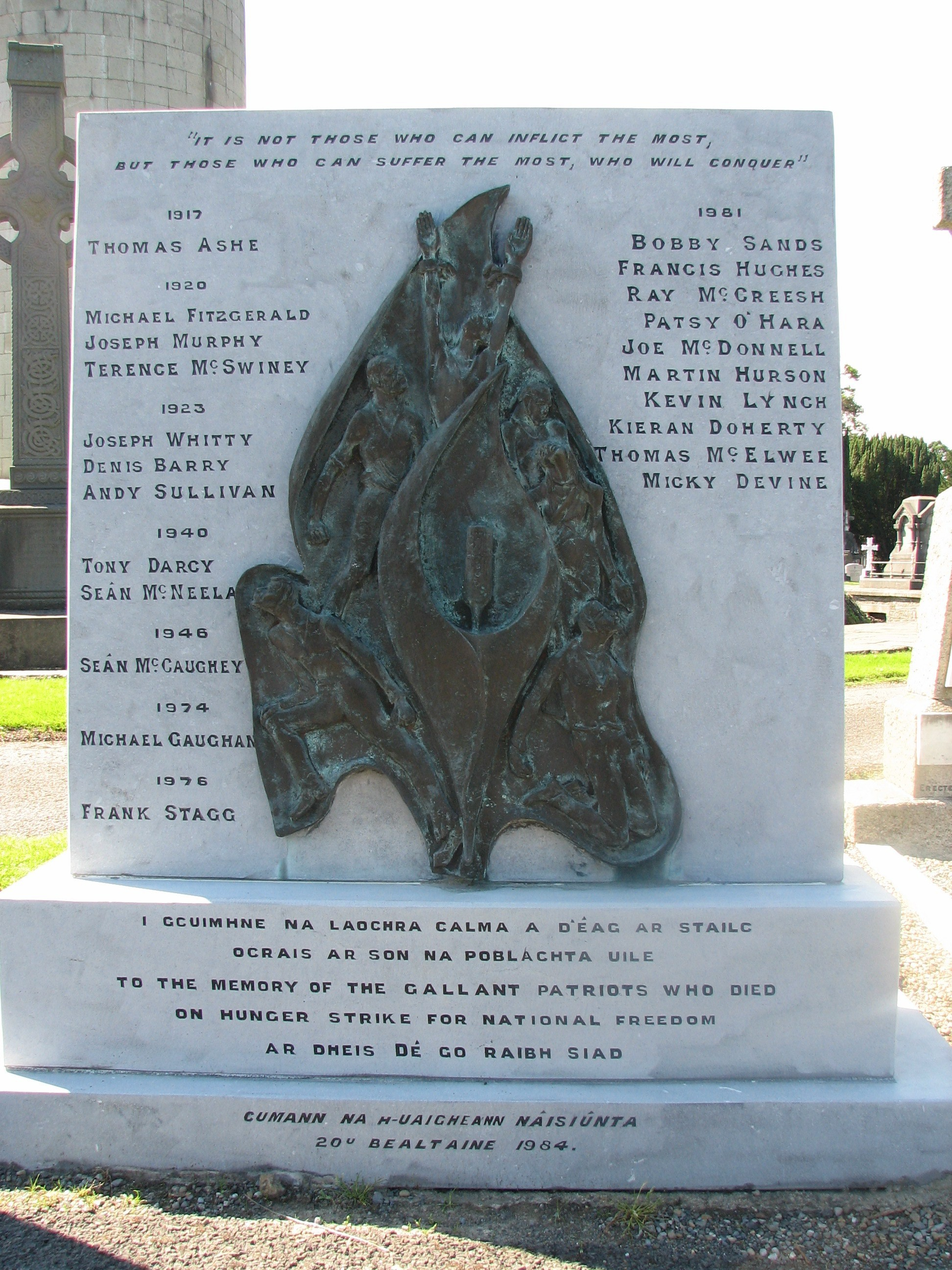
Hunger Strikers Memorial Glasnevin Cemetery Dublin

He was related to American actor Gregory Peck.

In 2017 a statue of Ashe was unveiled outside Round Towers GAA in Lusk. In the same town there is a 'Thomas Ashe Park'.

The Ashe Memorial Hall in Tralee, County Kerry was named after him. The words "Halla Tomáis Ághas" are embossed on the front of the building. Nearby Ashe Street (formerly Nelson Street) is also named for him.

== See also ==
- List of people on the postage stamps of Ireland
- 1923 Irish hunger strikes
- The First Hunger Striker: Thomas Ashe 1917, Sean O Mahony. Publisher: 1916–1921 Club.

== Bibliography ==
=== Primary sources ===
- Boyle, J.F., The Irish Rebellion of 1916 (London 1916)
- Brennan-Whitmore, W.J., Dublin Burning. The Easter Rising from Behind the Barricades text (Dublin 1966)
- Coakley, J, 'Patrick Pearse and the "Noble Lie" of Irish Nationalism', Studies in Conflict and Violence, 62 (1983), p. 119-34.
- Hobson, Bulmer, A Short History of the Irish Volunteers (Dublin 1918)
- O'Luing, Sean, I die in a good cause. A Study of Thomas Ashe, Idealist and Revolutionary (Tralee 1970)
- Lawless, Joseph, 'The Fight at Ashbourne', Capuchin Annual (1966), p. 307-16.
- Mulcahy, Richard, 'The Development of the Irish Volunteers 1916-22', An Cosantóir, 40(2) (1980), p. 35-40; (3), p. 67-71; (4), p. 99-102.
- O'Malley, Ernie, On Another Man's Wound (London and Dublin 1936).

=== Secondary sources ===
- Boyce, D.G., Nationalism in Ireland (London 3rd ed. 1995)
- Hayes-McCoy, G.A., 'A Military History of the 1916 Rising', in K.B.Nowlan (ed.), The Making of 1916. Studies in the History of the Rising (Dublin 1969)
- Martin, F.X., (ed.), Leaders and Men of the Easter Rising: Dublin 1916 (London 1967)
- Townshend, C, 'The Irish Republican Army and the Development of Guerilla Warfare 1916-21', English Historical Review 94 (1979), p. 318-45.
- Townshend, C, 'The Suppression of the Easter Rising', Bullan, I(I)(1994), p. 27-47.

Political offices
Preceded by Denis McCullough	President of the Irish Republican Brotherhood; 1916–1917	Succeeded by Seán McGarry
