= SpunOut.ie =

Irish non-governmental organisation

- Founded: 2004; 22 years ago Ballyshannon, County Donegal, Ireland
- Founder: Ruairí McKiernan
- Type: Nonprofit
- Headquarters: Seán MacBride House; 48 Fleet Street; Dublin, Ireland
- Location: Ireland
- Services: Youth information provision
- Executive Director: Ian Power
- Website: https://www.spunout.ie/

SpunOut.ie is an Irish non-governmental organisation focused on providing online youth information. Its tagline is "by young people, for young people".

The organisation's stated mission is to "help create an Ireland where young people aged between 16 and 25 are empowered with the information they need to live active, happy, and healthy lives".” SpunOut.ie is the sole project of Community Creations CLG.

It was founded in Donegal town in 2004 by Ruairí McKiernan. SpunOut.ie was previously based in Ballyshannon and Galway and is now situated in Seán MacBride House in Temple Bar, Dublin.

== Online ==
SpunOut.ie reaches over one million website users each year, providing thousands of pages of youth information and supportive factsheets on topics such as sexual health, mental health, politics, education and employment. The website includes true-life stories from young people who have overcome difficulties in life, hundreds of articles by young contributors on the issues that affect them, and signposting to numerous services and organisations on the island of Ireland.

SpunOut.ie also runs regular media campaigns on issues such as youth unemployment, gambling awareness, and mental health.

== Youth engagement ==
The overall direction and policies of SpunOut.ie are set by its Youth Action Panel, a group of more than 150 young people from across the island of Ireland divided into several regional divisions. Action Panel members act as ambassadors and role models for SpunOut.ie, set the organisation's campaigning and content priorities, and assist full-time staff team based in Dublin.

== Events and forums ==
SpunOut.ie organises events and forums that connect young people with decision makers, politicians and influential people. These have included the NESDO Futures Ireland Youth Forum, the Presidential Youth Forum with the 2011 Presidential Candidates, and the POSSIBILITIES 2011 social change summit (with Afri and Children in Crossfire) that featured the Dalai Lama, Mary Robinson and a programme of music, theatre, poetry and inspirational speakers.

== Media ==
SpunOut.ie has been featured in national media outlets in Ireland including RTÉ TV news, Nationwide, 360, iWitness, Seoige and O'Shea and TV3 news. It has been featured in the Irish Times Health Supplement and the Irish Times magazine and on RTÉ Radio's Today with Pat Kenny, Today FM's Ray D'Arcy Show amongst others.

=== Advocacy ===
SpunOut.ie has made representations to Oireachtas (Irish parliament) committees and met the Irish President, Ministers, TDs, Senators and MEPs to advocate for youth participation in public life and adequate investment in young people.

SpunOut.ie supported a Yes vote in the 2018 Referendum on the Repeal of the Eighth Amendment.

=== Outreach ===
SpunOut.ie visits schools, colleges and community settings to do talks and workshops on youth and civic issues. SpunOut.ie staff and volunteers also speak at youth, health, media and civic events and conferences. SpunOut.ie has published a range of publications including the 'Our Stories' journal of selected youth media, the 'Be The Revolution' social change booklet, and the 'Youth Rising' magazine, all of which have been distributed throughout Ireland.

== Awards ==
SpunOut.ie has won several awards including: Junior Chambers International, National Award for Social Entrepreneurship; Net Visionary Award,'Social Contribution' category; Interactive Media Award (Youth); Irish Digital Media Award; Ulster Bank Business Achievement Award; Global Young Social Entrepreneur Award (nominated); HSE Innovation Award in Communications and Technology; Social Entrepreneurs Ireland Award '06; Barnardos Young Volunteer of the Year Award. In 2012 SpunOut.ie won the Bronze Award at the Nokia Digital Media Awards in the category "Best Charity/Non Profit Use of Digital Media".

In September 2013, following a redesign of the SpunOut.ie website, SpunOut.ie won two Dot.ie Net Visionary Awards. Jason Coomey collected the "Most meticulous and cutting edge web developer (individual or agency)" and the organisation also won ""You Did Good" - Best Use of the Internet for Social Good" for its work with young people in Ireland. In 2013 SpunOut.ie also won an EU Youth Media Award for High Impact Digital Solutions in the Create your Culture! category.
