= Charles Casey (lawyer) =

Irish lawyer and judge (1895–1952)

Judge of the High Court
- In office 1 August 1951 – 12 June 1952
- Nominated by: Government of Ireland
- Appointed by: Seán T. O'Kelly

Attorney General of Ireland
- In office 21 April 1950 – 12 June 1951
- Taoiseach: John A. Costello
- Preceded by: Cecil Lavery
- Succeeded by: Cearbhall Ó Dálaigh

Personal details
- Born: 21 September 1895 Dublin, Ireland
- Died: 11 February 1952 (aged 56) Dublin, Ireland
- Party: Fine Gael
- Spouse: Helen Hanlon (m. 1925)
- Children: 8
- Education: University College Dublin

Charles Casey (21 September 1895 – 11 February 1952) was an Irish judge and lawyer who served as a Judge of the High Court from 1951 to 1952 and Attorney General of Ireland from 1950 to 1951.

He was born in Dublin in 1895 to an affluent family, second son of Dr. Charles Casey and his wife Mary Genevieve Conran. He was educated at the O'Connell Schools and Castleknock College. During World War I he served in the 16th (Irish) Division. He was called to the Bar in 1923 and made a Senior Counsel in 1941. Taoiseach John A. Costello chose him as Attorney General in 1950 to replace Cecil Lavery. The following year he was made a judge of the High Court, but he died after only fifteen months on the Bench.

He married in 1928 Helen Hanlon, who outlived him by many years, and they had eight children.

Casey, like Lavery, continued to take private work while Attorney General, with the approval of Costello. He showed questionable judgment in appearing for a private party in Re Tilson, infants [1951] I.R. 1 since while still Attorney General he was required to urge the Supreme Court to interpret the Constitution in the way which suited his client's private interests. While it was never suggested he had acted improperly, such cases fully justify the present rule that the Attorney General takes no private cases. He was also unusual among Irish Attorneys General in acting as the Government's spokesman when it refused to introduce legislation on adoption, on the ground that such legislation would be contrary to Roman Catholic teaching.

Legal offices
Preceded by Cecil Lavery	Attorney General of Ireland; 1950–1951	Succeeded by Cearbhall Ó Dálaigh
