= Patrick Hillery =

President of Ireland from 1976 to 1990

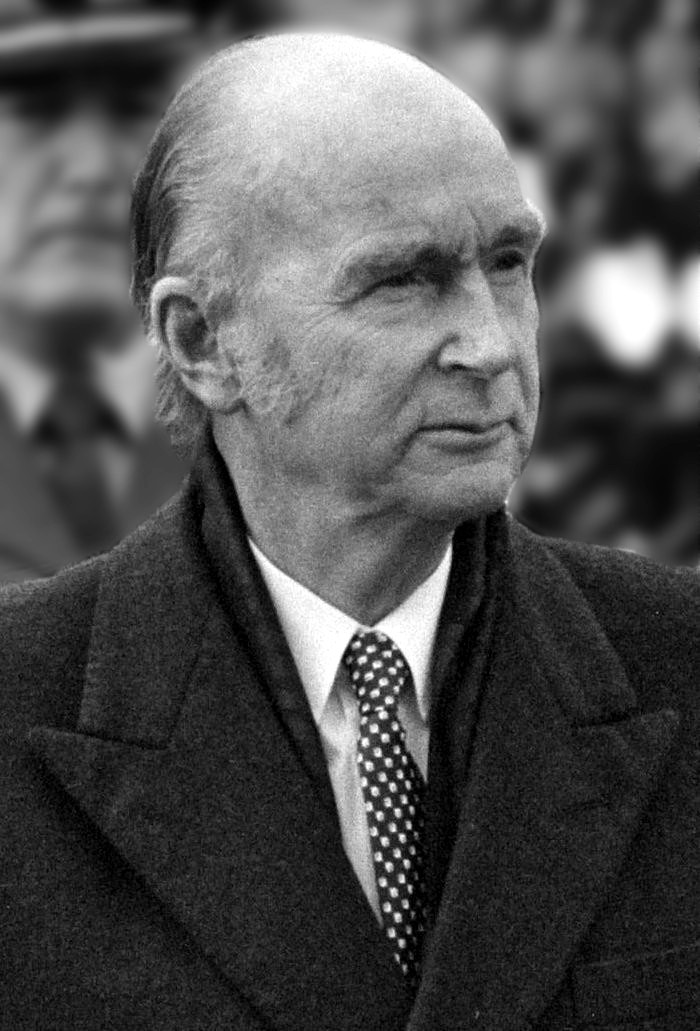
- Hillery in 1986

President of Ireland
- In office 3 December 1976 – 2 December 1990
- Taoiseach: Liam Cosgrave; Jack Lynch; Charles Haughey; Garret FitzGerald
- Preceded by: Cearbhall Ó Dálaigh
- Succeeded by: Mary Robinson

Vice-President of the European Commission
- In office 6 January 1973 – 5 January 1977
- President: François-Xavier Ortoli
- Preceded by: Wilhelm Haferkamp
- Succeeded by: Wilhelm Haferkamp

European Commissioner for Social Affairs
- In office 6 January 1973 – 2 December 1976
- President: François-Xavier Ortoli
- Preceded by: Albert Coppé
- Succeeded by: Henk Vredeling

Minister for External Affairs
- In office 2 July 1969 – 3 January 1973
- Taoiseach: Jack Lynch
- Preceded by: Frank Aiken
- Succeeded by: Brian Lenihan

Minister for Labour
- In office 13 July 1966 – 2 July 1969
- Taoiseach: Seán Lemass; Jack Lynch
- Preceded by: New office
- Succeeded by: Joseph Brennan

Minister for Industry and Commerce
- In office 21 April 1965 – 13 July 1966
- Taoiseach: Seán Lemass
- Preceded by: Jack Lynch
- Succeeded by: George Colley

Minister for Education
- In office 23 June 1959 – 21 April 1965
- Taoiseach: Seán Lemass
- Preceded by: Jack Lynch
- Succeeded by: George Colley

Teachta Dála
- In office May 1951 – 6 January 1973
- Constituency: Clare

Personal details
- Born: 2 May 1923 Spanish Point, County Clare, Ireland
- Died: 12 April 2008 (aged 84) Glasnevin, Dublin, Ireland
- Resting place: St. Fintan's Cemetery, Sutton
- Party: Fianna Fáil
- Spouse: Maeve Finnegan (m. 1955)
- Children: 2
- Education: University College Dublin; Royal College of Surgeons
- Profession: Medical doctor; politician; diplomat

Patrick John Hillery (2 May 1923 – 12 April 2008) was an Irish Fianna Fáil politician who served as the president of Ireland from December 1976 to December 1990. He also served as vice-president of the European Commission and European Commissioner for Social Affairs from 1973 to 1976, Minister for External Affairs from 1969 to 1973, Minister for Labour from 1966 to 1969, Minister for Industry and Commerce from 1965 to 1969 and Minister for Education from 1959 to 1965. He served as a Teachta Dála (TD) for the Clare constituency from 1951 to 1973.

In 1973, he was appointed Ireland's first European Commissioner, upon Ireland's accession to the European Economic Community, serving until 1976, when he became President of Ireland. He served two terms in the presidency. Though seen as a somewhat lacklustre president, he was credited with bringing stability and dignity to the office, and won widespread admiration when it emerged that he had withstood political pressure from his own Fianna Fáil party during a political crisis in 1982.

== Early and private life ==
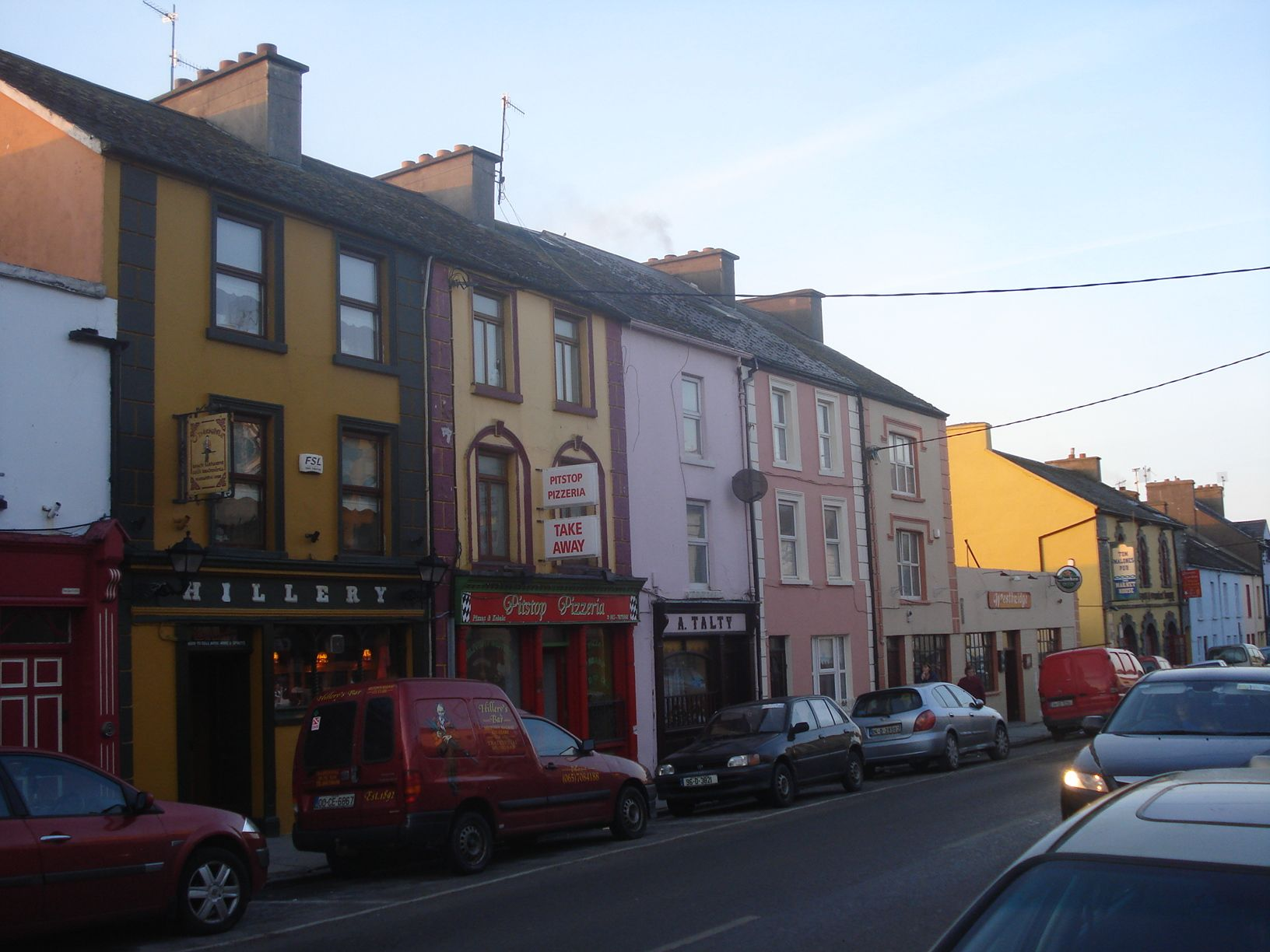
Hillery's Pub on Main Street, Milltown Malbay

Patrick John Hillery, more popularly known as Paddy Hillery, was born in Spanish Point, County Clare, in 1923. The son of Michael Joseph Hillery, a local doctor, and Ellen McMahon, a district nurse, he was educated locally at Milltown Malbay National School, before later attending Rockwell College. At the third level, Hillery attended University College Dublin, where he qualified with a degree in medicine. Upon his conferral in 1947, he returned to his native town where he followed in his father's footsteps as a doctor. Hillery's medical career in the 1950s, saw him serve as a member of the National Health Council and as Medical Officer for the Milltown Malbay Dispensary District. He also spent a year working as coroner for West Clare.

Hillery married Maeve Finnegan, on 27 October 1955. Together they had a son, John, and a daughter, Vivienne, who died after a long illness in 1987, shortly before her eighteenth birthday.

== Domestic political career ==
Hillery, though not initially political, agreed under pressure from Clare's senior Fianna Fáil TD, party leader and former Taoiseach, Éamon de Valera, to become his running mate at the 1951 general election. Hillery received enough transfers from de Valera to be elected.

De Valera was elected as president of Ireland in 1959, and was succeeded as Taoiseach by Seán Lemass. Under Lemass, many party elders such as James Ryan, Seán MacEntee and Paddy Smith, retired and a new generation of politicians were introduced to government, such as Brian Lenihan, Donogh O'Malley, Charles Haughey and Neil Blaney. Key among this new breed of politician was Hillery, who was given his first position in cabinet as Minister for Education in 1959, succeeding Jack Lynch in that post.

=== Government minister 1959–1973 ===
As Minister for Education, Hillery was responsible for much innovative thinking in a department which would become very important under Lemass's leadership. In 1963, he made a major policy speech in which he outlined many of the educational reforms that were to be introduced over the next decade. These included increased educational opportunities for many, the establishment of comprehensive schools and Regional Technical Colleges. He also proposed access by students to all public examinations. As Minister for Education, Hillery laid the groundwork for successive Ministers to advance the reforms and initiatives he had begun. While Donogh O'Malley, has received much of the credit for introducing free education, it was in fact Hillery who laid much of the groundwork before this landmark announcement.

In 1965, Hillery succeeded Lynch again by taking over as Minister for Industry and Commerce. This department was considered one of the most important in kick-starting Ireland's economy. Hillery only remained in this position for just over a year, becoming the country's first Minister for Labour in 1966, as industrial disputes began to take their toll. This new department had been an ambition of Lemass's for several years.

Lemass resigned as Taoiseach and leader of Fianna Fáil in November 1966, a shock to many of his political friends. Hillery was invited by Lemass to allow his name to go forward for the leadership of the party, however, he declined explaining that he had no interest. Jack Lynch succeeded Lemass after a leadership contest with George Colley. Hillery retained his post as Minister for Labour in Lynch's cabinet, serving until 1969.

Following a further victory for Fianna Fáil at the 1969 general election, Hillery was appointed Minister for External Affairs (renamed Foreign Affairs in 1971), one of the most prestigious of cabinet posts. He earned an international profile when, in the aftermath of the killing of fourteen unarmed civilians in Derry, by British paratroopers (known as Bloody Sunday), he travelled to the United Nations to demand UN involvement in peace-keeping on the streets of Northern Ireland. The trip to the UN achieved very little, other than to draw the attention of the world to the worsening situation in Northern Ireland. During the whole period, Hillery remained one of Jack Lynch's staunchest allies in pursuing peaceful means with regard to the possibility of a civil war breaking out. Although considered a mild-mannered politician, Hillery showed his mettle at the 1971 Fianna Fáil Ard Fheis when Kevin Boland, an opponent of Lynch's Northern policy, stormed a nearby podium and launched a very public and vocal attack on the Fianna Fáil leadership. While some of his supporters started chanting "We want Boland", Hillery, who by this stage had grabbed the nearest microphone, shouted down the Boland faction with the line "Ye can have Boland but ye can't have Fianna Fáil."

As well as affairs in Northern Ireland, as Minister for Foreign Affairs, Hillery also negotiated Irish membership of the European Economic Community (EEC), a process that was completed in 1973.

== European Commissioner 1973–1976 ==
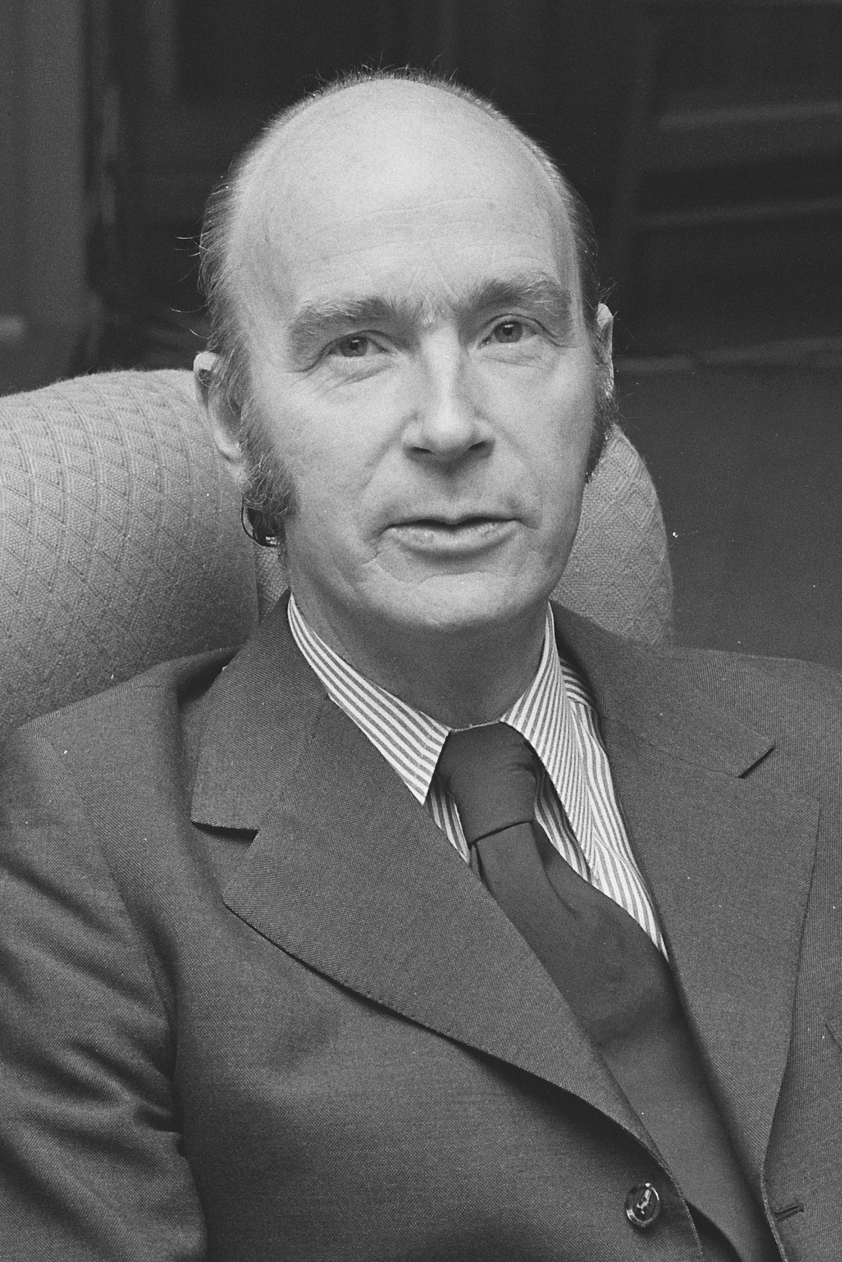
Hillery in 1973

Following Ireland's successful entry into the European Economic Community (ECC), Hillery was rewarded by becoming the first Irish politician to serve on the European Commission. He was appointed Vice-President of the European Commission and European Commissioner for Social Affairs. While Europe had gained one of Ireland's most capable and respected politicians, Jack Lynch had lost one of his allies, and someone who may have been in line to take over the leadership following Lynch's retirement. As Social Affairs Commissioner, Hillery's most famous policy initiative was to force EEC member states to give equal pay to women. However, in 1976, the then-Irish government, the Fine Gael–Labour Party National Coalition, under Taoiseach Liam Cosgrave, informed him that he was not being re-appointed to the Commission. He considered returning to medicine, perhaps moving with his wife, Maeve (also a doctor) to Africa. However, fate took a turn, when the then Minister for Defence, Paddy Donegan, launched a ferocious verbal attack on the then president, Cearbhall Ó Dálaigh, calling him "a thundering disgrace" for referring anti-terrorist legislation to the Supreme Court of Ireland to test its constitutionality. When Ó Dálaigh resigned, a deeply reluctant Hillery agreed to become the Fianna Fáil candidate for the presidency. Fine Gael and Labour decided it was unwise to nominate a candidate, in light of the row over Ó Dálaigh's resignation and the part the government played in the affair. As a result, Hillery was elected unopposed, becoming President of Ireland on 3 December 1976.

== President of Ireland ==
=== The fake "sex scandal" during the papal visit ===
Though once voted the world's sexiest head of state by readers of the German Der Spiegel magazine, few expected Hillery to become embroiled in a sex scandal as president. Yet, one occurred in September 1979, when the international press corps, travelling to Ireland for the visit of Pope John Paul II, told their Irish colleagues that Europe was "awash" with rumours that Hillery had a mistress living with him in Áras an Uachtaráin (the presidential residence), that he and his wife were divorcing and he was considering resigning from the presidency. However, the story was untrue. Once the Pope had left, Hillery held a press conference where he told a shocked nation that there was no mistress, no divorce and no resignation. In reality, few people had even heard of the rumours. Critics questioned why he chose to comment on a rumour that few outside media and political circles had heard. Hillery, however, defended his action by saying that it was important to kill off the story for the good of the presidency, rather than allow the rumour to circulate and be accepted as fact in the absence of a denial. In that, he was supported by the then Taoiseach, Jack Lynch, whom he consulted before making the decision, he also got the support of Leader of the Opposition, Garret FitzGerald, of Fine Gael and Frank Cluskey, of the Labour Party. In 2008, Historian John Walsh claimed that within Irish political circles, the source of the rumours about Hillery was widely believed to have been planted by the leader of Fianna Fáil Charles Haughey, who was attempting to force Hillery to resign from office.

Hillery also hit the headlines when, on the advice of then Taoiseach, Charles Haughey, he declined Queen Elizabeth II's invitation to attend the wedding of Prince Charles and Lady Diana Spencer in 1981.

=== Phone calls to Áras an Uachtaráin ===
It was in 1982 that Hillery's reputation as President was arguably made. In January 1982, the Fine Gael-Labour Party coalition government of Taoiseach Garret FitzGerald lost a budget vote in Dáil Éireann. Since this was a loss of supply, FitzGerald travelled to Áras an Uachtaráin, to ask for a dissolution of the Dáil. Under Article 13.2.2°, (Note: Under Article 28.10 of the Irish Constitution, a Taoiseach who has "ceased to retain the support of a majority in Dáil Éireann" (e.g., defeat in a budget or loss of confidence) must either (i) resign, or (ii) seek a parliamentary dissolution. Under Article 13.2.2°, where a Taoiseach in such circumstances requests a parliamentary dissolution, the President may "in his absolute discretion" refuse that request, forcing the Taoiseach back to the only other option, resignation. The president of Ireland cannot ask someone to form a government; a Taoiseach is nominated by a vote of Dáil Éireann and only thereafter appointed by the president, so had Hillery refused FitzGerald a dissolution, he could not have asked Haughey to form a government. Haughey would have had to have been nominated by Dáil Éireann.) If Hillery refused FitzGerald's request for a dissolution, FitzGerald would have had to resign. Had this happened, Haughey, as Leader of the Opposition, would have been the next contender to form a government. While Hillery was considering FitzGerald's request, a series of phone calls (some published reports claim seven, others eight) was made by senior opposition figures urging Hillery to refuse the dissolution, allowing Haughey a chance to form a government.

Hillery regarded such pressure as gross misconduct, and ordered one of his aides de camp, Captain Anthony Barber, not to pass on any telephone calls from opposition figures. He might also have been motivated by a conflict between the English and Irish versions of the Constitution. While the English version vests the President with certain powers that he uses "in his absolute discretion," the Irish version states that these powers are used as a chomhairle féin, which usually translates to "under his own counsel". While "absolute discretion" implies that presidents have some latitude in whether to initiate contact with the opposition under these circumstances, "under his own counsel" has been understood to mean that no contact whatsoever can take place with the opposition. Whenever there is a conflict between the Irish and English versions, the Irish one takes precedence. In the end, Hillery granted the dissolution. (No Irish president to date has ever refused such a request.)

By 1990, Hillery's term seemed to be reaching a quiet end, until the events of 1982 resurfaced. Three candidates had been nominated in the 1990 presidential election: the then Tánaiste, Brian Lenihan from Fianna Fáil (heavily tipped as the certain winner), Austin Currie from Fine Gael and Mary Robinson from the Labour Party. In May 1990, in an on the record interview with Jim Duffy, a post-graduate student researching the Irish presidency, Lenihan had confirmed that he had been one of those phoning President Hillery in January 1982. He confirmed that Haughey too had made phone calls. Jim Duffy mentioned the information in a newspaper article on the history of the Irish presidency on 28 September 1990 in The Irish Times. In October 1990, Lenihan changed his story, claiming (even though he had said the opposite for eight years) that he had played "no hand, act or part" in pressurising President Hillery that night. He made these denials in an interview in The Irish Press (a Fianna Fáil–leaning newspaper) and on Questions and Answers, an RTÉ 1 political show.

When it was realised that he had said the opposite in an on-the-record interview in May 1990, his campaign panicked and tried to pressurise Duffy into not revealing the information. Their pressure backfired, particularly when his campaign manager, Bertie Ahern, named Duffy as the person to whom he had given the interview in a radio broadcast, prompting Duffy to release the relevant segment of his interview with Lenihan. In the aftermath, the minority partner in the coalition government, the Progressive Democrats, indicated that unless Lenihan resigned or was dismissed from cabinet, they would pull out of the coalition and support an opposition motion of no confidence in Dáil Éireann, bringing down the government and forcing a general election. Publicly, Haughey insisted that it was entirely a matter for Lenihan, his "friend of thirty years" and that he was putting no pressure on him. In reality, under pressure from the PDs, Haughey gave Lenihan a letter of resignation to sign. When Lenihan refused, Haughey formally advised President Hillery to sack Lenihan from the cabinet. As required by Article 13.1.3 of the Constitution, Hillery did so. Lenihan's campaign never recovered, and he became the first candidate from Fianna Fáil to lose a presidential election, having begun the campaign as the favourite. Instead, Labour's Mary Robinson became the first elected President of Ireland from outside Fianna Fáil, and the first woman to hold the office.

The revelations, and the discovery that Hillery had stood up to pressure in 1982 from former cabinet colleagues, including his close friend Brian Lenihan, substantially increased Hillery's standing. From a low-key, modest presidency that had been seen as mediocre, his presidency came to be seen as embodying the highest standards of integrity. His reputation rose further when opposition leaders under parliamentary privilege alleged that Haughey, who in January 1982, had been Leader of the Opposition, had not merely rung the President's Office but threatened to end the career of the army officer who took the call and who, on Hillery's explicit instructions, had refused to put through the call to the president. Haughey angrily denied the charge, though Lenihan, in his subsequently published account of the affair, noted that Haughey had denied "insulting" the officer, whereas the allegation was that he had "threatened" him. Hillery, it was revealed, had called in the Irish Army's Chief of Staff the following day and as Commander-in-Chief of the Army had ordered the Chief of Staff to ensure that no politician ever interfered with the career of the young army officer. About ten years after the incident, RTÉ attempted to interview the young officer with regard to the allegations but as a serving officer, he was unable to comment.

=== Later period as President ===
Having been re-elected unopposed in 1983, Hillery (until then) shared the distinction with Seán T. O'Kelly and Éamon de Valera of serving two full terms as President of Ireland. He was one of three holders of the office of President who did not face a popular election for the office, the others being Douglas Hyde and Cearbhall Ó Dálaigh. Hillery left office in 1990, serving the maximum two terms, widely applauded for his integrity, honesty and devotion to duty. The previous image of Hillery, as low-key, dull and unexciting (except for the bizarre sex rumours), had been somewhat undermined. President Hillery retired from public life.

He re-entered public life in 2002, during the second referendum on the Nice Treaty, when he urged a yes vote.

== Foreign assessment ==
In 2002, state papers released by the British Public Record Office under the thirty-year rule, (Note: Irish and British state papers are generally released after a delay of thirty years with the exception of papers that are deemed to 'damage the country's image or foreign relations' if they were to be released. In January 2003, the papers from 1972, were released. Irish and British newspapers give extensive coverage to the new releases from the National Archives in Dublin and London, and the Public Record Office in Belfast, at the start of every year.) published in the Irish media, revealed how Hillery was viewed. A briefing paper – prepared for the Foreign Secretary, Alec Douglas-Home, and the Secretary of State for Northern Ireland, William Whitelaw – observed about Hillery, then Minister for Foreign Affairs:

Dr Hillery is regarded as a powerhouse for ideas, one of the few members of Fianna Fáil who has new policies and is eager to implement them.

The greatest example of this has been in his present job, where he has perforce concentrated on Anglo-Irish relations and, in particular, the North. Policy in this field is determined primarily between him and the Taoiseach; and it is likely that the Fianna Fáil new line on the North owes much to Dr Hillery.

== Death ==
Patrick Hillery died on 12 April 2008, in his Dublin home, following a short illness. His family agreed to a full state funeral for the former president. He was buried at St. Fintan's Cemetery, Sutton, Dublin. In tributes, President Mary McAleese said "He was involved in every facet of policy-making that paved the way to a new, modern Ireland. Today, we detect his foresight and pioneering agenda everywhere – a free education system, a dynamic, well-educated people, a successful economy and a thriving membership of the European Union, one of the single most transformative events for this country." Taoiseach Bertie Ahern said he "was a man of great integrity, decency and intelligence, who contributed massively to the progress of our country and he is assured of an honoured place in Ireland's history". In the Dáil and Seanad, he was praised by all political leaders and parties during expressions of sympathy on 15 April 2008. In the graveside oration, Tánaiste Brian Cowen said Hillery was "A humble man of simple tastes, he has been variously described as honourable, decent, intelligent, courteous, warm and engaging. He was all of those things and more."

In April 2023 a stamp to mark the 100th anniversary of his birth was issued.

== Notes ==
Political offices
| Preceded by Jack Lynch | Minister for Education; 1959–1965 | Succeeded by George Colley |
| Preceded by Jack Lynch | Minister for Industry and Commerce; 1965–1966 | Succeeded by George Colley |
| New office | Minister for Labour; 1966–1969 | Succeeded by Joseph Brennan |
| Preceded by Frank Aiken | Minister for Foreign Affairs; 1969–1973 | Succeeded by Brian Lenihan |
| New office Ireland joins the EEC | Irish European Commissioner; 1973–1976 | Succeeded by Richard Burke |
| Preceded by Albert Coppé | European Commissioner for Social Affairs; 1973–1976 | Succeeded by Henk Vredeling |
| Preceded by Cearbhall Ó Dálaigh | President of Ireland; 1976–1990 | Succeeded by Mary Robinson |

| Dáil | Election | Deputy (Party) | Deputy (Party) | Deputy (Party) | Deputy (Party) | Deputy (Party) |
|---|---|---|---|---|---|---|
| 2nd | 1921 | Éamon de Valera (SF) | Brian O'Higgins (SF) | Seán Liddy (SF) | Patrick Brennan (SF) | 4 seats 1921–1923 |
| 3rd | 1922 | Éamon de Valera (AT-SF) | Brian O'Higgins (AT-SF) | Seán Liddy (PT-SF) | Patrick Brennan (PT-SF) | 4 seats 1921–1923 |
| 4th | 1923 | Éamon de Valera (Rep) | Brian O'Higgins (Rep) | Conor Hogan (FP) | Patrick Hogan (Lab) | Eoin MacNeill (CnaG) |
| 5th | 1927 (Jun) | Éamon de Valera (FF) | Patrick Houlihan (FF) | Thomas Falvey (FP) | Patrick Hogan (Lab) | Patrick Kelly (CnaG) |
| 6th | 1927 (Sep) | Éamon de Valera (FF) | Patrick Houlihan (FF) | Martin Sexton (FF) | Patrick Hogan (Lab) | Patrick Kelly (CnaG) |
| 7th | 1932 | Éamon de Valera (FF) | Seán O'Grady (FF) | Martin Sexton (FF) | Patrick Hogan (Lab) | Patrick Burke (CnaG) |
| 8th | 1933 | Éamon de Valera (FF) | Seán O'Grady (FF) | Patrick Houlihan (FF) | Patrick Hogan (Lab) | Patrick Burke (CnaG) |
| 9th | 1937 | Éamon de Valera (FF) | Seán O'Grady (FF) | Thomas Burke (FP) | Patrick Hogan (Lab) | Patrick Burke (FG) |
| 10th | 1938 | Éamon de Valera (FF) | Seán O'Grady (FF) | Thomas Burke (FP) | Peter O'Loghlen (FF) | Patrick Burke (FG) |
| 11th | 1943 | Éamon de Valera (FF) | Seán O'Grady (FF) | Thomas Burke (FP) | Patrick Hogan (Lab) | Patrick Burke (FG) |
| 12th | 1944 | Éamon de Valera (FF) | Seán O'Grady (FF) | Thomas Burke (FP) | Peter O'Loghlen (FF) | Patrick Burke (FG) |
| 12th | 1945 by-election | Éamon de Valera (FF) | Seán O'Grady (FF) | Thomas Burke (FP) | Peter O'Loghlen (FF) | Patrick Shanahan (FF) |
| 13th | 1948 | Éamon de Valera (FF) | Seán O'Grady (FF) | Thomas Burke (FP) | Patrick Hogan (Lab) | 4 seats 1948–1969 |
| 14th | 1951 | Éamon de Valera (FF) | Patrick Hillery (FF) | William Murphy (FG) | Patrick Hogan (Lab) | 4 seats 1948–1969 |
| 15th | 1954 | Éamon de Valera (FF) | Patrick Hillery (FF) | William Murphy (FG) | Patrick Hogan (Lab) | 4 seats 1948–1969 |
| 16th | 1957 | Éamon de Valera (FF) | Patrick Hillery (FF) | William Murphy (FG) | Patrick Hogan (Lab) | 4 seats 1948–1969 |
| 16th | 1959 by-election | Seán Ó Ceallaigh (FF) | Patrick Hillery (FF) | William Murphy (FG) | Patrick Hogan (Lab) | 4 seats 1948–1969 |
| 17th | 1961 | Seán Ó Ceallaigh (FF) | Patrick Hillery (FF) | William Murphy (FG) | Patrick Hogan (Lab) | 4 seats 1948–1969 |
| 18th | 1965 | Seán Ó Ceallaigh (FF) | Patrick Hillery (FF) | William Murphy (FG) | Patrick Hogan (Lab) | 4 seats 1948–1969 |
| 18th | 1968 by-election | Seán Ó Ceallaigh (FF) | Patrick Hillery (FF) | Sylvester Barrett (FF) | Patrick Hogan (Lab) | 4 seats 1948–1969 |
| 19th | 1969 | Frank Taylor (FG) | Patrick Hillery (FF) | Sylvester Barrett (FF) | 3 seats 1969–1981 | |
| 20th | 1973 | Frank Taylor (FG) | Brendan Daly (FF) | Sylvester Barrett (FF) | 3 seats 1969–1981 | |
| 21st | 1977 | Frank Taylor (FG) | Brendan Daly (FF) | Sylvester Barrett (FF) | 3 seats 1969–1981 | |
| 22nd | 1981 | Madeleine Taylor (FG) | Brendan Daly (FF) | Sylvester Barrett (FF) | Bill Loughnane (FF) | 4 seats since 1981 |
| 23rd | 1982 (Feb) | Donal Carey (FG) | Brendan Daly (FF) | Sylvester Barrett (FF) | Bill Loughnane (FF) | 4 seats since 1981 |
| 24th | 1982 (Nov) | Donal Carey (FG) | Brendan Daly (FF) | Sylvester Barrett (FF) | Madeleine Taylor-Quinn (FG) | 4 seats since 1981 |
| 25th | 1987 | Donal Carey (FG) | Brendan Daly (FF) | Síle de Valera (FF) | Madeleine Taylor-Quinn (FG) | 4 seats since 1981 |
| 26th | 1989 | Donal Carey (FG) | Brendan Daly (FF) | Síle de Valera (FF) | Madeleine Taylor-Quinn (FG) | 4 seats since 1981 |
| 27th | 1992 | Donal Carey (FG) | Moosajee Bhamjee (Lab) | Síle de Valera (FF) | Tony Killeen (FF) | 4 seats since 1981 |
| 28th | 1997 | Donal Carey (FG) | Brendan Daly (FF) | Síle de Valera (FF) | Tony Killeen (FF) | 4 seats since 1981 |
| 29th | 2002 | Pat Breen (FG) | James Breen (Ind.) | Síle de Valera (FF) | Tony Killeen (FF) | 4 seats since 1981 |
| 30th | 2007 | Pat Breen (FG) | Joe Carey (FG) | Timmy Dooley (FF) | Tony Killeen (FF) | 4 seats since 1981 |
| 31st | 2011 | Pat Breen (FG) | Joe Carey (FG) | Timmy Dooley (FF) | Michael McNamara (Lab) | 4 seats since 1981 |
| 32nd | 2016 | Pat Breen (FG) | Joe Carey (FG) | Timmy Dooley (FF) | Michael Harty (Ind.) | 4 seats since 1981 |
| 33rd | 2020 | Violet-Anne Wynne (SF) | Joe Carey (FG) | Cathal Crowe (FF) | Michael McNamara (Ind.) | 4 seats since 1981 |
| 34th | 2024 | Donna McGettigan (SF) | Joe Cooney (FG) | Cathal Crowe (FF) | Timmy Dooley (FF) | 4 seats since 1981 |
