= Attorney General Connolly =

Attorney General Connolly may refer to:

- Patrick Connolly (1927–2016), Attorney General of Ireland
- Terry Connolly (1958–2007), Attorney-General of the Australian Capital Territory

== See also ==
- Edward Conolly (judge) (1822–1908), Attorney-General of New Zealand
- William G. Conley (1866–1940), Attorney General of West Virginia
