= Kevin Dixon =

Kevin Dixon may refer to:

- Kevin Dixon (attorney general) (1902–1959), Irish barrister and judge
- Kevin Dixon (footballer, born 1960), English former professional footballer
- Kevin Dixon (footballer, born 1980), English former professional footballer
- Kevin Dixon (rugby league), New Zealand rugby league international
