= John L. Murray (judge) =

Irish judge, Chief Justice 2004-2011

Chief Justice of Ireland
- In office 23 July 2004 – 25 July 2011
- Nominated by: Government of Ireland
- Appointed by: Mary McAleese
- Preceded by: Ronan Keane
- Succeeded by: Susan Denham

Judge of the Supreme Court
- In office 2 May 1999 – 26 June 2015
- Nominated by: Government of Ireland
- Appointed by: Mary McAleese

Judge of the European Court of Justice
- In office 15 September 1992 – 2 May 1999
- Nominated by: Government of Ireland
- Appointed by: European Council

Attorney General of Ireland
- In office 11 March 1987 – 25 September 1991
- Taoiseach: Charles Haughey
- Preceded by: John Rogers
- Succeeded by: Harry Whelehan
- In office 17 August 1982 – 14 December 1982
- Taoiseach: Charles Haughey
- Preceded by: Patrick Connolly
- Succeeded by: Peter Sutherland

Personal details
- Born: 27 June 1943 Limerick, Ireland
- Died: 18 January 2023 (aged 79) Greystones, County Wicklow, Ireland
- Party: Fianna Fáil
- Spouse: Gabrielle Murray (m. 1975)
- Children: 2
- Education: University College Dublin; King's Inns

John Loyola Murray (27 June 1943 – 18 January 2023) was an Irish judge who served as Chief Justice of Ireland from 2004 to 2011, a judge of the Supreme Court from 1999 to 2015, a judge of the European Court of Justice from 1992 to 1999 and as Attorney General of Ireland from August 1982 to December 1982 and 1987 to 1991.

== Early career ==
Murray was born in Limerick on 27 June 1943. He was educated at Crescent College, Limerick, Rockwell College, County Tipperary, University College Dublin, and the King's Inns. He was twice elected President of Aontas na Mac Léinn in Éirinn (AMLÉ), formerly the Union of Students in Ireland (USI). in 1966/67. He qualified as a barrister in 1967 and had a successful law practice dealing with commercial, civil, and constitutional law.

== Attorney General ==
Murray was Attorney General of Ireland under the Fianna Fáil government from 17 August to 14 December 1982. The Taoiseach, Charles Haughey, appointed him as Attorney General after his predecessor, Patrick Connolly, resigned abruptly over the GUBU scandal, when a murderer Malcolm McArthur was arrested in Connolly's Dalkey flat.

His next term in office as Attorney General extended from 11 March 1987 to 25 September 1991. In 1988, he refused to allow the extradition of Fr. Patrick Ryan to Britain on explosives charges dealing with the Provisional IRA, on the basis that the trial he would be given would not be fair due to excessive media coverage and remarks made in Parliament by the British Prime Minister Margaret Thatcher which were considered prejudicial.

== Judicial career ==
In 1991, he was appointed a Judge of the European Court of Justice serving until 1999, when he was appointed to the Irish Supreme Court.

Murray served on the Supreme Court from 1999. He was appointed Chief Justice of Ireland in 2004.

In 2011, Chief Justice Murray became involved in controversy with the Government over a proposal to amend the Constitution to allow the remuneration of judges to be reduced in parallel to the remuneration of public servants in State employment.

The criticisms of the Government's plans were contained in a 12-page critique by Chief Justice Murray, and the President of the High Court, Nicholas Kearns, and published in the Court Services website, but subsequently redacted at the request of the Government.

He retired as Chief Justice in 2011, though he remained a member of the Supreme Court until 2015.

== Chancellor of the University of Limerick ==
Murray was appointed Chancellor of the University of Limerick (and so also Chairman of UL's Governing Authority) in 2013.

== Telephone tapping inquiry ==
In January 2016, it was announced that the Minister for Justice and Equality had appointed Murray to conduct a review of the legislation allowing access to the phone records of journalists. Murray was asked to propose any legislative changes required and examine the legislation in other countries and examine best international practice in this area.

== Personal life and death ==
Murray was married to Gabrielle Walsh, daughter of Brian Walsh, a former Supreme Court judge, described as "one of Ireland's greatest judges" and the "outstanding legal reforming mind of his generation" by Prof. J. J. Lee.

His brother, Michael D. Murray, is the State Solicitor for Limerick City.

Murray died on 18 January 2023, at the age of 79.

== See also ==
- List of members of the European Court of Justice

Legal offices
Preceded by Patrick Connolly	Attorney General of Ireland; 1982	Succeeded by Peter Sutherland
Preceded by John Rogers	Attorney General of Ireland; 1987–1991	Succeeded by Harry Whelehan
Preceded by Ronan Keane	Chief Justice of Ireland; 2004–2011	Succeeded by Susan Denham
