= Attorney General Woulfe =

Attorney General Woulfe may refer to:

- Arthur Wolfe, 1st Viscount Kilwarden (1739–1803), Attorney-General for Ireland
- Séamus Woulfe (born 1963), Attorney General of Ireland
- Stephen Woulfe (1787–1840), Attorney-General for Ireland
