= 1917 East Clare by-election =

UK Parliamentary by-election

The 1917 East Clare by-election was held on 10 July 1917. It followed the death of the incumbent MP, Willie Redmond of the Irish Parliamentary Party, who was killed in action during the First World War. The seat had been held since its creation in 1885 by constitutional nationalist MPs, and Redmond had been unopposed in every election since 1900.

The result was announced on 11 July 1917. It was won by the Sinn Féin candidate Éamon de Valera who had campaigned in military Irish Volunteers uniform. De Valera had recently been released from imprisonment as a result of his involvement in the 1916 Easter Rising and 'made it crystal clear that he stood by the events of Easter Week' and for an independent Irish Republic. Though he said that another armed insurrection was 'not feasible' at the present time. His election posters said a vote for de Valera was, ‘a vote for Ireland a Nation, a vote against Conscription, a vote against partition, a vote for Ireland’s language, and for Ireland’s ideals and civilisation’.

Patrick Lynch, his opponent was a barrister and Crown prosecutor. His campaign maintained that he was also against conscription, despite the IPP's support for Irish recruitment into British forces in the First World War. His party's energies were also distracted by another by-election in Kilkenny.

David McCullough writes, 'There was a lot of violence during the campaign, much of it apparently coming from Lynch's supporters' and 150 British Army soldiers had to be drafted in to help the police maintain order.

Daith O Corrain writes, 'The East Clare by-election was a milestone for Sinn Féin because it secured a striking popular mandate which helped the organisation to continue its rapid growth ahead of the 1918 general election.

By-election 10 July 1917: Clare East
Party	Candidate	Votes	%	±%
Sinn Féin	Éamon de Valera	5,010	71.1	New
Irish Parliamentary	Patrick Lynch	2,035	28.9	N/A
Majority		2,975	42.2	N/A
Turnout		7,045	77.2	N/A
Sinn Féin gain from Irish Parliamentary		Swing	N/A	
