= Eric Wyndham White =

1st Director-General of the General Agreement on Tariffs and Trade
- In office 23 March 1965 – 6 May 1968
- Preceded by: none
- Succeeded by: Olivier Long

Personal details
- Born: 26 January 1913
- Died: 27 January 1980 (aged 67) France

Sir Eric Wyndham White KCMG (1913–1980) was a British administrator and economist. He was founder and first executive secretary of the General Agreement on Tariffs and Trade between 1948 and 1965. He was the first director-general of General Agreement on Tariffs and Trade from 1965 to 1968.

Born on 26 January 1913, White was educated at the Westminster City School and the London School of Economics. He graduated as a LLB with first class honours and in 1938 was called to the bar by the Middle Temple. He was an assistant lecturer at the LSE until the Second World War started when he moved to the Ministry of Economic Warfare. In 1942 he became the First Secretary at the British Embassy in Washington.

In 1945 he became Special Assistant to the European Director of the United Nations Relief and Rehabilitation Administration. He became involved in the forming of a secretariat for a new international trade organisation, the General Agreement on Tariffs and Trade in 1948 and became the first Director-General.

For a brief time in 1970, he was the chairman of the financially troubled mutual fund Investors Overseas Service.

White died aged 67 on 27 January 1980 in France after suffering a heart attack while swimming.

| Preceded by (none) | Director-General of the General Agreement on Tariffs and Trade; 1965–1968 | Succeeded by Olivier Long |
