= Director-General of the General Agreement on Tariffs and Trade =

The Director-General of the General Agreement on Tariffs and Trade was responsible for supervising the administrative functions of the General Agreement on Tariffs and Trade (GATT). The first Director-General, Eric Wyndham White, was appointed on March 23, 1965. GATT had a total of 4 Director-Generals until the WTO was formed in 1995. Peter Sutherland was the last Director-General of GATT, and the first of the WTO.

	Name	Took office	Left office	Country
1	Eric Wyndham White	1948	6 May 1968	United Kingdom
2	Olivier Long	6 May 1968	1 October 1980	Switzerland
3	Arthur Dunkel	1 October 1980	1 July 1993	Switzerland
4	Peter Sutherland	1 July 1993	1 May 1995 (WTO)	Ireland

== See also ==
- Director-General of the World Trade Organization
