= Kevin Haugh =

Irish judge (1901–1969)

Judge of the Supreme Court
- In office 1 January 1961 – 14 August 1968
- Nominated by: Government of Ireland
- Appointed by: Seán T. O'Kelly

Judge of the High Court
- In office 11 October 1942 – 30 December 1960
- Nominated by: Government of Ireland
- Appointed by: Seán T. O'Kelly

Attorney General of Ireland
- In office 2 March 1940 – 10 October 1942
- Taoiseach: Éamon de Valera
- Preceded by: Patrick Lynch
- Succeeded by: Kevin Dixon

Personal details
- Born: 17 November 1901 Dublin, Ireland
- Died: 5 April 1969 (aged 67) Dublin, Ireland
- Party: Fianna Fáil
- Spouse: Elizabeth Jonesll (m. 1934)
- Children: 3
- Education: University College Dublin; King's Inns

Kevin O'Hanrahan Haugh (17 November 1901 – 5 April 1969) was an Irish judge who served as a Judge of the Supreme Court from 1961 to 1968, a Judge of the High Court from 1942 to 1960 and Attorney General of Ireland from 1940 to 1942.

He was born in Dublin in 1901. He was educated at Blackrock College and University College Dublin. He was called to the Bar in 1925 and he became Senior Counsel 1938. He was appointed as the Attorney General of Ireland in 1940, and served in the role until 1942, when he was appointed a High Court judge. He was for many years the Probate Judge and an acknowledged authority on succession law. He became a Judge of the Supreme Court in 1961. He retired in 1968 and died the following year.

His son, also Kevin (1944–2009) followed his father's path to the Bar and the High Court; unlike his father, he was also a judge of the Circuit Court. He was an immensely popular judge whose career was cut short by his early death in 2009.

Legal offices
Preceded by Patrick Lynch	Attorney General of Ireland; 1940–1942	Succeeded by Kevin Dixon
