= Anthony J. Hederman =

Irish judge and barrister (1921–2014)

Judge of the Supreme Court
- In office 30 June 1981 – 30 July 1993
- Nominated by: Government of Ireland
- Appointed by: Patrick Hillery

Attorney General of Ireland
- In office 6 July 1977 – 29 June 1981
- Taoiseach: Jack Lynch; Charles Haughey
- Preceded by: John M. Kelly
- Succeeded by: Peter Sutherland

Personal details
- Born: 11 August 1921 Naas, County Kildare, Ireland
- Died: 10 January 2014 (aged 92) Blackrock, Dublin, Ireland
- Party: Fianna Fáil
- Education: University College Dublin; King's Inns

Anthony James Hederman (11 August 1921 – 10 January 2014) was an Irish judge and barrister who served as a Judge of the Supreme Court from 1981 to 1993 and Attorney General of Ireland from 1977 to 1981.

== Early life ==
He was born on 11 August 1921 in Naas, County Kildare, Ireland. He was educated at Castleknock College, a private Roman Catholic boys' school in Dublin where he developed a useful network of contacts. His contemporaries at school included the future Taoiseach Liam Cosgrave. He went on to obtain an honours degree in legal and political science from University College Dublin. He was a member of Fianna Fáil and for a time in the 1960s was joint Honorary Treasurer of the party (along with Neil Blaney).

== Legal career ==
Hederman was called to the Bar in 1944. He mainly undertook prosecutions and other State work. He was Attorney General of Ireland from July 1977 to June 1981. In 1981, he was appointed as a Judge of the Supreme Court of Ireland and served there until 1993. He was the sole dissenter in the X Case judgement. He was later appointed as the president of the Law Reform Commission. He died in 2014. After his death the UCD Student Legal Service society named its annual moot court competition in honour of the late Mr Justice Hederman.

Legal offices
Preceded by John Kelly	Attorney General of Ireland; 1977–1981	Succeeded by Peter Sutherland
