= Patrick Lynch (Irish attorney general) =

Irish barrister and politician (1866–1947)

Attorney General of Ireland
- In office 22 December 1936 – 1 March 1940
- Taoiseach: Éamon de Valera
- Preceded by: James Geoghegan
- Succeeded by: Kevin Haugh

Senator
- In office 28 September 1934 – 29 May 1936
- Constituency: Labour Panel

Personal details
- Born: 10 February 1866 County Clare, Ireland
- Died: 9 December 1947 (aged 81) Cork, Ireland
- Party: Fianna Fáil
- Spouse: Rita Galvin
- Education: Royal University of Ireland; King's Inns

Patrick Gregory Lynch (10 February 1866 – 9 December 1947) was an Irish barrister who served as Attorney General of Ireland from 1936 to 1941. He was also a Senator for the Labour Panel from 1934 to 1936.

He was born on 10 February 1866 in Latoon House, County Clare to John Lynch, a farmer, and Elizabeth Lynch (née Kelly). He graduated from the Royal University of Ireland.

A member of the Irish Parliamentary Party, he took the Parnellite side when that party split. He was an unsuccessful Irish Parliamentary Party candidate in the 1917 East Clare by-election, losing to Éamon de Valera. He joined Sinn Féin within a year. He opposed the Anglo-Irish Treaty in 1922.

He became a King's Inns bencher in 1925. In a Seanad Éireann by-election held on 28 September 1934, he was elected as a Fianna Fáil Senator, to fill the vacancy caused by the resignation of Arthur Vincent, serving until the body's abolition in 1936.

He was Attorney General of Ireland from 1936 to 1937 and reappointed under the new Constitution, serving from 1937 to 1940. Maurice Healy in his memoir "The Old Munster Circuit" praised Lynch's outstanding integrity and strength of character, and while he was not normally an admirer of Éamon de Valera, praised him for an inspired choice of Lynch as Attorney General.

His youngest brother James, was state solicitor for Clare under the Cumann na nGaedheal government.

Legal offices
Preceded by James Geoghegan	Attorney General of Ireland; 1936–1940	Succeeded by Kevin Haugh
