= Attorney General of Ireland =

Chief law officer of Ireland

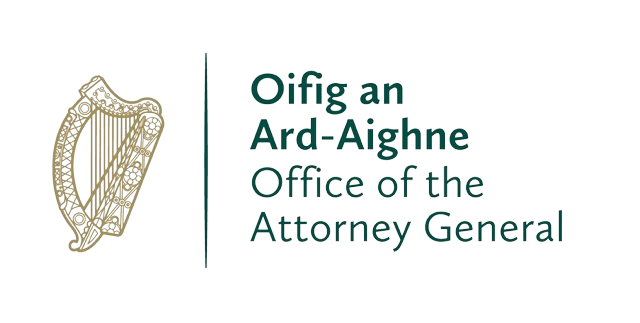

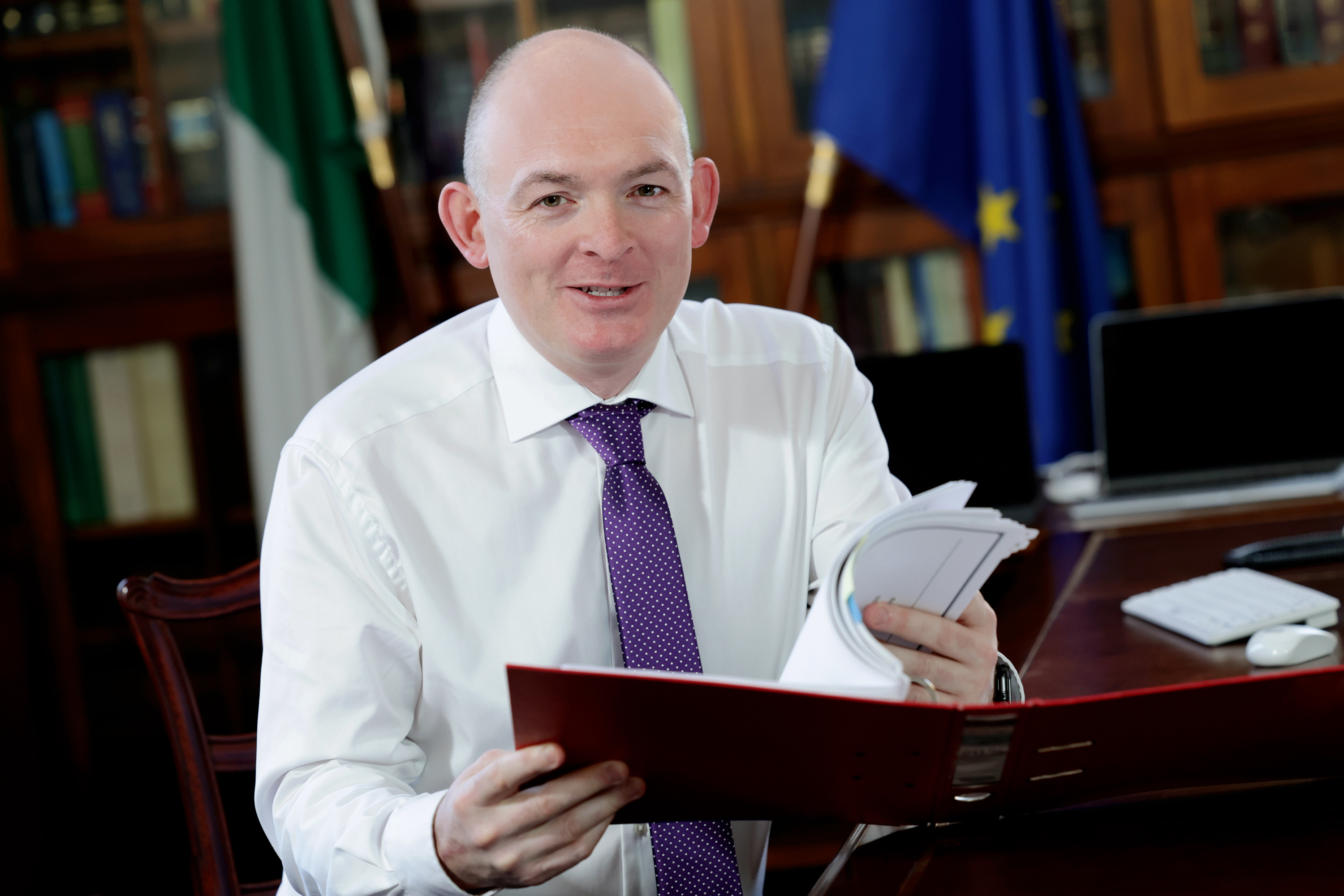
- Incumbent; Rossa Fanning since 17 December 2022
- Office of the Attorney General
- Nominator: Taoiseach
- Appointer: President
- Inaugural holder: Hugh Kennedy
- Formation: 31 January 1922
- Website: Official website

The attorney general of Ireland (Irish: An tArd-Aighne) is a constitutional officer who is the legal adviser to the Government and is therefore the chief law officer of the State. The attorney general is not a member of the Government but does participate in cabinet meetings when invited and attends government meetings. The current attorney general is Rossa Fanning, SC.

== Overview ==
The office and functions of the attorney general are outlined in Article 30 of the Constitution of Ireland.

The attorney general has always been a barrister rather than a solicitor, although this is not a requirement for the post. In cases where a barrister nominated by the Taoiseach to be the attorney general was not a senior counsel at the time, the government of the day has made them one first, as occurred in the cases of John M. Kelly and John Rogers.

The attorney general advises the government on the constitutionality of bills and treaties, and presents the government's case if the President refers any bill to the Supreme Court under Article 26 of the Constitution before signing it.

The attorney general has few prosecution duties; these are limited to functions under the various Fisheries Acts and Extradition Acts. Instead, the Director of Public Prosecutions has responsibility for all other criminal prosecutions in the State.

The Office of the Attorney General is made up of different offices:

- The Attorney General's Office (located at Government Buildings, Merrion Street, Dublin 2) containing the advisory counsel to the attorney general (providing legal advice)
- The Office of the Parliamentary Counsel (also located at Merrion Street, Dublin 2) containing the Parliamentary Counsel who draft legislation and have responsibilities in the area of Statute Law revision
- The Chief State Solicitor's Office (located at Little Ship Street, Dublin 8) containing the solicitors representing the Attorney and the State who provide litigation, conveyancing and other transactional services
- The Statute Law Revision Unit which simplifies and improves the body of statute law

Part of the attorney general's function has been to support the Statute Law Revision Programme of the Law Reform Commission, which reviews all legislation passed before independence to investigate which laws are obsolete and may be repealed, and which should be kept. This includes laws of the United Kingdom of Great Britain and Ireland, Britain, England, and the Irish Parliament. For example, the killing of cattle in Dublin is still regulated, in part by an Irish act of 1743, the Slaughter of Cattle Act 1743 (17 Geo. 2. c. 5 (I)), while the "Treatment of Foreign Merchants" is governed by clause 30 of Magna Carta (25 Edw. 1), an act of the Parliament of England dated 1297.

== History ==
The Ministers and Secretaries Act 1924 provided a legislative basis for the Attorney-General of the Irish Free State (Irish: Príomh-Atúrnae Shaorstáit Éireann). This act provided it with:

the business, powers, authorities, duties and functions formerly vested in or exercised by the Attorney-General for Ireland, the Solicitor-General for Ireland, the Attorney-General for Southern Ireland, the Solicitor-General for Southern Ireland, the Law Adviser to the Lord Lieutenant of Ireland and any or all of them respectively, and the administration and control of the business, powers, authorities, duties and functions of the branches and officers of the public services specified in the Ninth Part of the Schedule to this Act and also the administration and business generally of public services in connection with the representation of the Government of Saorstát Eireann and of the public in all legal proceedings for the enforcement of law, the punishment of offenders and the assertion or protection of public rights and all powers, duties and functions connected with the same respectively, together with the duty of advising the Executive Council and the several Ministers in matters of law and of legal opinion.

It also transferred the following bodies to the office of the Attorney-General:

- Chief Crown Solicitor for Ireland.
- Chief State Solicitor's Department and all local State Solicitors.
- Treasury Solicitor for Ireland.
- Parliamentary Draftsman.
- Charities.
- Estates of illegitimate deceased persons.

The Constitution of Ireland, which came into operation on 29 December 1937, established the position of Attorney General of Ireland in Article 30, providing it with a constitutional basis for the first time. (Note: Unlike the earlier offices, there was no hyphen between the words attorney and general in the office established by the Constitution of Ireland.) Article 59 provided that the attorney general of Saorstát Éireann before the coming into operation of the Constitution would become the attorney general on the coming into operation of the Constitution without the need for an appointment, which occurred on 29 December 1937.

Until 1974, the attorney general was responsible for the prosecution of criminal offences. In 1974, the position of Director of Public Prosecutions was established. Local state solicitors were transferred to the Director of Public Prosecutions in 2007.

== Other functions ==
Two less well-known but significant roles played by all Irish Attorneys General to date are as the "leader of the Irish Bar" and as a Bencher of the King's Inns. The acceptance by Attorneys General of these non-statutory and often secretive roles upon taking office throughout the years has been questioned and criticised as inappropriate for a constitutional office-holder. In 1990, the Fair Trade Commission stated that "[w]e have recommended that the Bar Council should be the primary disciplinary body for barristers, and it does not include any members of the judiciary. The Attorney General is, however, a member of the Bar Council, and the Commission believes that it is preferable that he should not be involved when the Bar Council is exercising its disciplinary function. The Attorney General is also a member of the Council of King's Inns, and the Commission believes it to preferable that he should not participate in any disciplinary activity pursued by that body either. Indeed, in general, we find the membership of these bodies by the Attorney General to be somewhat anomalous."

== Office of the Parliamentary Counsel to the Government ==
The Office of the Parliamentary Counsel to the Government is the Office of the parliamentary counsel to the Government of Ireland. It is part of the office of the Attorney General. It drafts bills which the Government intends to introduce in the Oireachtas. Although the Oireachtas as the legislature has formal authority to enact legislation, in practice the government whip rarely allows substantive amendments to bills to be made in the Dáil or Seanad; thus the Parliamentary Counsel's role is crucial.

== List of attorneys general ==
=== Attorneys general of the Irish Free State ===
Name	Term of office		Subsequent judicial or political career
Hugh Kennedy (TD for Dublin South)	31 January 1922 (Note: Kennedy was formally appointed Attorney General on 7 December 1922, the day after the establishment of the Irish Free State. Before then he was legal adviser to the Provisional Government of the Irish Free State.)	5 June 1924	Chief Justice 1924–1936
John O'Byrne	7 June 1924	9 January 1926	High Court judge 1926–1940; Supreme Court judge 1940–1954
John A. Costello	9 January 1926	9 March 1932	Taoiseach 1948–1951, 1954–1957
Conor Maguire (TD for the National University)	10 March 1932	2 November 1936	President of the High Court 1936–1946; Chief Justice 1946–1961
James Geoghegan (TD for Longford–Westmeath)	2 November 1936	22 December 1936	Supreme Court judge 1936–1949
Patrick Lynch	22 December 1936	29 December 1937	Continued as AG of Ireland
=== Attorneys general of Ireland ===
Name	Term of office		Subsequent judicial or political career
Patrick Lynch	29 December 1937	1 March 1940	
Kevin Haugh	2 March 1940	10 October 1942	High Court judge 1942–1961; Supreme Court judge 1961–1969
Kevin Dixon	10 October 1942	30 April 1946	High Court judge 1946–1959
Cearbhall Ó Dálaigh	30 April 1946	18 February 1948	Chief Justice of Ireland
Cecil Lavery (Senator on the Cultural and Educational Panel)	19 February 1948	21 April 1950	Supreme Court judge 1950–1966
Charles Casey	21 April 1950	12 June 1951	High Court judge 1951–1952
Cearbhall Ó Dálaigh (2nd time)	14 June 1951	11 July 1953	Supreme Court judge 1953–1973; Chief Justice 1961–1973; European Court of Justice judge 1973–1974; President of Ireland 1974–1976
Thomas Teevan	11 July 1953	30 January 1954	High Court judge 1954–1971
Aindrias Ó Caoimh	30 January 1954	2 June 1954	
Patrick McGilligan (TD for Dublin North-Central)	2 June 1954	20 March 1957	
Aindrias Ó Caoimh (2nd time)	20 March 1957	15 March 1965	President of the High Court 1966–1974; European Court of Justice judge 1975–1985
Colm Condon	16 March 1965	14 March 1973	
Declan Costello (TD for Dublin South-West)	15 March 1973	19 May 1977	Judge of the High Court 1977–1998; President of the High Court 1995–1998
John Kelly (TD for Dublin South)	20 May 1977	5 July 1977	Minister for Trade, Commerce and Tourism 1981–1982
Anthony J. Hederman	6 July 1977	29 June 1981	Supreme Court judge 1981–1993
Peter Sutherland	30 June 1981	9 March 1982	
Patrick Connolly	10 March 1982	16 August 1982	
John L. Murray	17 August 1982	14 December 1982	
Peter Sutherland (2nd time)	15 December 1982	12 December 1984	European Commissioner for Competition 1985–1989; Director-General of the General Agreement on Tariffs and Trade 1993–1994; Director-General of the World Trade Organization 1995; Chairman of Goldman Sachs 1995–2015; UN Special Representative for International Migration 2006–2017
John Rogers	13 December 1984	10 March 1987	
John L. Murray (2nd time)	11 March 1987	25 September 1991	European Court of Justice judge 1992–1999; Supreme Court judge 1999–2015; Chief Justice 2004–2011
Harry Whelehan	26 September 1991	11 November 1994	President of the High Court 15–17 November 1994
Eoghan Fitzsimons	11 November 1994	15 December 1994	
Dermot Gleeson	15 December 1994	26 June 1997	
David Byrne	26 June 1997	17 July 1999	European Commissioner for Consumer Protection 1999–2004
Michael McDowell	17 July 1999	6 June 2002	Minister for Justice, Equality and Law Reform 2002–2007; Tánaiste 2006–2007; Senator for National University of Ireland since 2016
Rory Brady	7 June 2002	14 June 2007	
Paul Gallagher	14 June 2007	9 March 2011	
Máire Whelan	9 March 2011	14 June 2017	Court of Appeal judge 2017–
Séamus Woulfe	14 June 2017	27 June 2020	Supreme Court judge 2020–
Paul Gallagher (2nd time)	27 June 2020	17 December 2022	
Rossa Fanning	17 December 2022	Incumbent	
