= Olivier Long =

Director-General of the General Agreement on Tariffs and Trade
- In office 6 May 1968 – 1 October 1980
- Preceded by: Eric Wyndham White
- Succeeded by: Arthur Dunkel

Personal details
- Born: 11 October 1915
- Died: 19 March 2003 (aged 87)

Olivier Long (11 October 1915 – 19 March 2003) was a Swiss Ambassador and the director-general of the General Agreement on Tariffs and Trade from 6 May 1968 to 1 October 1980.

Oliver Long was born at Petit-Veyrier, Switzerland, near Geneva, on 11 October 1915. Besides having studied in London and Harvard, he had a Doctor of Laws from the University of Paris and Doctor of Political Science from the University of Geneva and the Graduate Institute of International Studies. After military service in 1939–43, he joined the International Committee of the Red Cross (ICRC) and traveled across wartime Europe, negotiating prisoner-of-war exchanges and food relief assistance. After the war, he joined the Swiss federal government, and after service in Washington and London he began to work on trade issues as the director general of the General Agreement on Tariffs and Trade. He helped keep the Western world moving toward freer trade in the 1970s despite protectionist pressures brought on by soaring oil prices, inflation and recession.

As director general of the General Agreement on Tariffs and Trade (GATT) from 1968 to 1980, Oliver Long helped to bring about the largest reductions in tariffs since World War II. GATT, an organization based in Geneva, was created in 1948 to oversee international trade. He was the second director general of GATT, taking over from Eric Wyndham White, who had run the organization for the first 20 years of its existence. At first he was reluctant to take the job, since doing so meant giving up his post as Switzerland's ambassador to Britain and Malta, which he had accepted in 1967.

Representatives of the leading industrial nations met at a 1973 summit meeting in Tokyo, setting off a six-year free-trade effort that became known as the Tokyo Round. These were difficult years for proponents of free trade. When oil prices quadrupled at the end of 1973—a consequence of actions by the Organization of the Petroleum Exporting Countries (OPEC)—the twin shocks of recession and inflation rippled through the world economy. National currencies became exceptionally unstable. Industries everywhere pleaded with their governments for protection against foreign competitors. Yet Long managed to hold the world's democratic industrial governments, as well as some 20 developing countries, to the free trade commitments they had made at the start of negotiations. Not only did many tariffs drop, the Tokyo Round also represented the most comprehensive effort until then to eliminate or control other sorts of trade barriers, like quotas and export subsidies. In 1995, at the conclusion of another trade-liberalizing exercise known as the Uruguay Round, GATT's role in governing world commerce was assumed by the World Trade Organization, a new and more powerful institution.

Because of his close personal ties with many leading French politicians, Oliver Long became an intermediary between Charles de Gaulle's government in Paris and the Algerian National Liberation Front. He helped set up the talks that eventually led to the Evian agreements of 1962, which ended the Algerian war.

Oliver Long returned to commercial diplomacy, playing a prominent role in negotiations that led to creation of the European Free Trade Association (EFTA), a trade bloc set up in 1959 by seven European countries that did not wish to join the six-nation European Community, or Common Market. He was also a professor at the Graduate Institute of International Studies in Geneva, and was the author of several books and articles on economic affairs and political science.

He is survived by his wife, the former Francine Roels, whom he married in 1946, and by two daughters and a son, Dr. Eric Long .

Preceded by Eric Wyndham White	Director-General of the General Agreement on Tariffs and Trade; 1968–1980	Succeeded by Arthur Dunkel
