= Malcolm MacArthur affair =

Killings and political scandal in Ireland

Malcolm MacArthur
- Born: 17 April 1945 (age 81); Dublin, Ireland
- Status: Released
- Motive: Robbery
- Criminal charge: Murder
- Penalty: Life imprisonment

Details
- Victims: 2
- Date: 22–25 July 1982
- Country: Ireland
- Weapons: Hammer, shotgun
- Date apprehended: 13 August 1982

The Malcolm MacArthur affair was a double-murder and political scandal in Ireland in 1982. On 22 July, MacArthur fatally attacked a young nurse, Bridie Gargan, in Phoenix Park, Dublin. Three days later he killed a farmer, Dónal Dunne, at Edenderry in County Offaly.

A major manhunt ensued, and on 13 August, MacArthur was apprehended by Gardaí at the home of the Attorney General, Patrick Connolly, in Dalkey in south Dublin. Connolly was an acquaintance of MacArthur. Although Connolly was not involved in the killings, the incident created a political scandal, and led to Connolly's resignation. A speech by the Taoiseach, Charles Haughey, in which he described the incident as "a bizarre happening, an unprecedented situation, a grotesque situation, an almost unbelievable mischance" was paraphrased as "grotesque, unbelievable, bizarre and unprecedented", leading Conor Cruise O'Brien to coin the acronym "GUBU", which came to characterise Haughey's 1982 government.

MacArthur pleaded guilty to the murder of Gargan and was sentenced to life in prison in January 1983. He was not tried for the killing of Dunne. He was released in 2012.

== Background ==
Malcolm Edward MacArthur was born in Dublin on 17 April 1945 to an affluent family who owned a 180-acre farm near Trim, County Meath. His paternal grandparents were Catholics who had immigrated to Ireland from Scotland in the early 20th century. MacArthur's parents separated while he was young and he went to live in the United States with an uncle before graduating from University of California, Davis. He returned to Ireland in the late 1960s. MacArthur was perceived by those who knew him to be academically inclined and socially inhibited. He ran in bohemian circles in Dublin, wearing bow-ties and fawn-coloured corduroy jackets which gave him a reputation as an intelligent eccentric. MacArthur had a partner, Brenda Little, and together they had a son in 1975. It was through Little that MacArthur became acquainted with Patrick Connolly.

== Killings ==
MacArthur did not have a job, as he lived off his IR£70,000 inheritance (the equivalent of almost €900,000 in 2023) from the sale of his father's farm after the latter's death in 1971. However, as his money ran out, MacArthur decided to fund his lifestyle by robbery. First he decided to purchase a gun and responded to an advertisement by Dónal Dunne, a farmer in Edenderry, County Offaly, who had a shotgun for sale. However, having no transport and needing to get from Dublin to Edenderry, he decided to steal a car.

=== Bridie Gargan ===
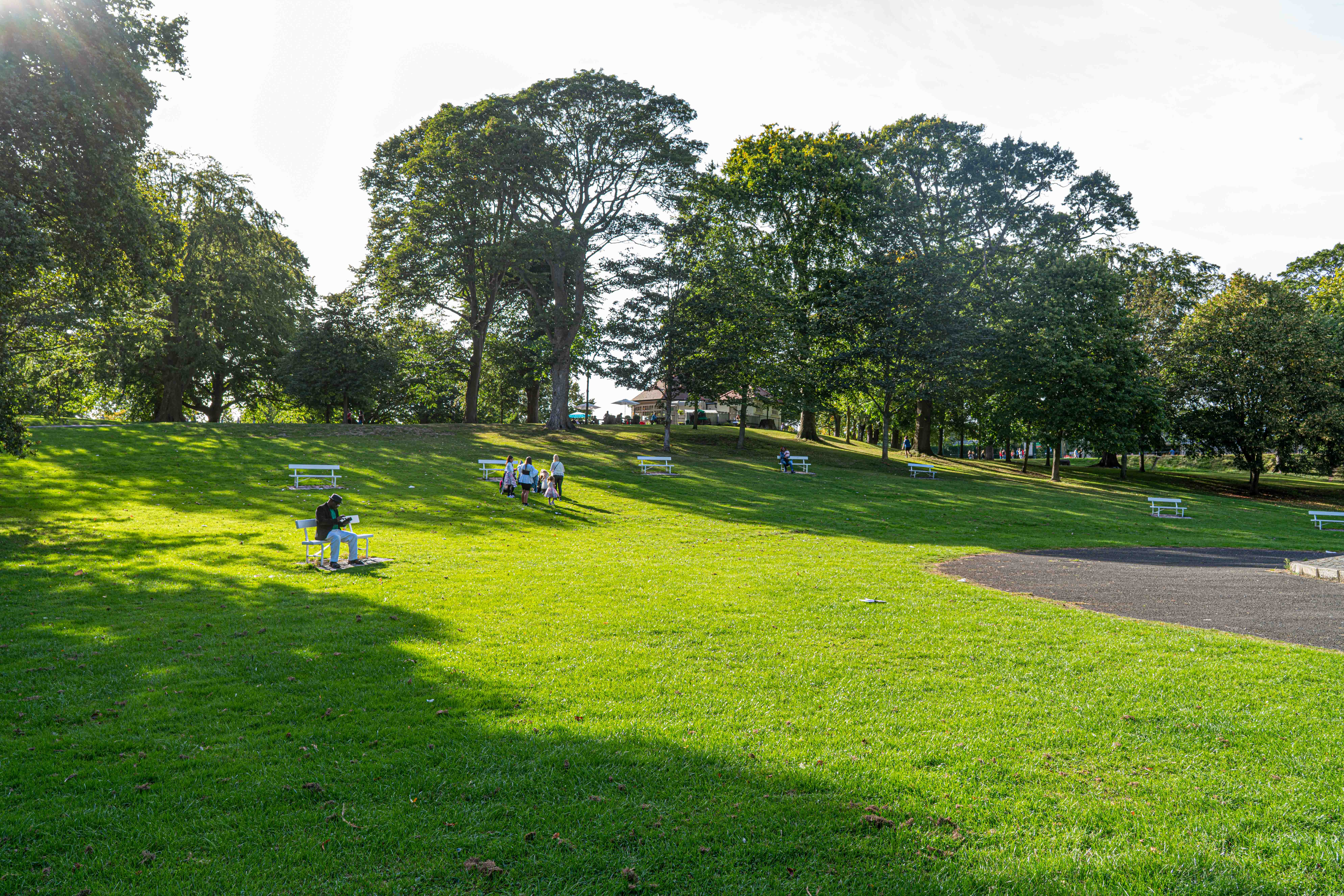
Phoenix Park in 2019

Bridie Gargan was a 27-year-old nurse who worked at St. James's Hospital, and was three months away from qualifying as a midwife. Originally from farmland near Dunshaughlin in County Meath, she lived in the suburb of Castleknock during the week and returned home at weekends.

On Thursday 22 July, she returned home from her hospital shift in her car, a Renault 5, travelling through Phoenix Park on the way to Castleknock. It was a sunny, 25-degree afternoon, and she decided to stop and sunbathe for a time at a spot close to the rear entrance of the Deerfield Residence. MacArthur, dressed in unseasonably warm clothing, ambushed Gargan with an imitation pistol. He ordered her back into her car and said he was going to tie her up; at this, Gargan panicked, and MacArthur bludgeoned her with a hammer he had bought from a hardware shop on Capel Street earlier that day. The incident was witnessed by Paddy Byrne, a groundskeeper at Deerfield, who grappled with MacArthur and attempted to take the gun from him, not realising it was fake. Gargan sat in the back seat of the car, bloodied but conscious.

MacArthur sped away after fending off Byrne. An ambulance going to St. James's Hospital encountered the Renault 5 at the gate of the park and gave it an escort, due to the sticker for St. James's Gargan that it had on the windscreen. Gargan remained conscious and attempted to flag down onlookers, smearing blood on the car window. As soon as the ambulance and car reached the front gate of the hospital, MacArthur drove away down the South Circular Road. He abandoned the car and the dying Gargan in Rialto. The car was discovered shortly afterwards. Gargan was brought to the hospital and placed on life support; she died four days later.

=== Dónal Dunne ===
Three days after the Gargan attack, having hitch-hiked to Edenderry and spent a night sleeping under a bridge, MacArthur visited the farmer Dónal Dunne and murdered him with his own shotgun after examining it. MacArthur then stole Dunne's car and drove it to Dublin. These two violent murders created a sensation, as an unmotivated murder in Ireland, coupled with the youth and respectability of the nurse and farmer, was an unusual set of circumstances. At first, the Gardaí regarded the two incidents as unrelated, but the fact that in both cases the murderer had escaped in the victim's car created a tenuous link.

== Manhunt ==
On 4 August, MacArthur attempted to rob Harry Bieling, a former American diplomat, at gunpoint at his home in Killiney. Bieling escaped on foot and notified Gardaí, but did not know MacArthur's name. A man operating a newspaper stand in Monkstown tipped off Gardaí that one of his customers fitted the description of Bridie Gargan's killer. Gardaí questioned Bieling, now believing that his robbery and the Gargan murder were linked; they also believed it might be linked to the homophobic murder of Charles Self, which had occurred in Monkstown earlier that year.

MacArthur was acquainted with Patrick Connolly, the Attorney General, the chief legal advisor to the Irish Government. On 4 August 1982, he arrived at Connolly's apartment in Dalkey looking for somewhere to stay. From the Attorney General's home, MacArthur called Bieling and told him the attempted robbery had been a practical joke; he then telephoned Dalkey Garda station to tell them the same thing. Now the Gardaí knew MacArthur's name, but did not know his whereabouts. MacArthur had previously stayed at a flat occupied by Connolly in Donnybrook; Gardaí interrogated the owner of the flat, who confirmed the link between the two men.

== Arrest, political scandal and "GUBU" ==
On 13 August, after a massive search, MacArthur was arrested in connection with the robbery of Bieling on the private property of Connolly, where he had been staying for some time as a guest. It was only after MacArthur had been led away by officers that Connolly was told that he was also wanted in connection with the murder of Gargan. This astonished Connolly, who feared the prospect of telling MacArthur's partner and mother. Connolly, who had been getting ready for a holiday, continued on his journey to the United States and did not give any interview to the Gardaí on the matter. MacArthur confessed to the murders of Gargan and Dunne while in custody.

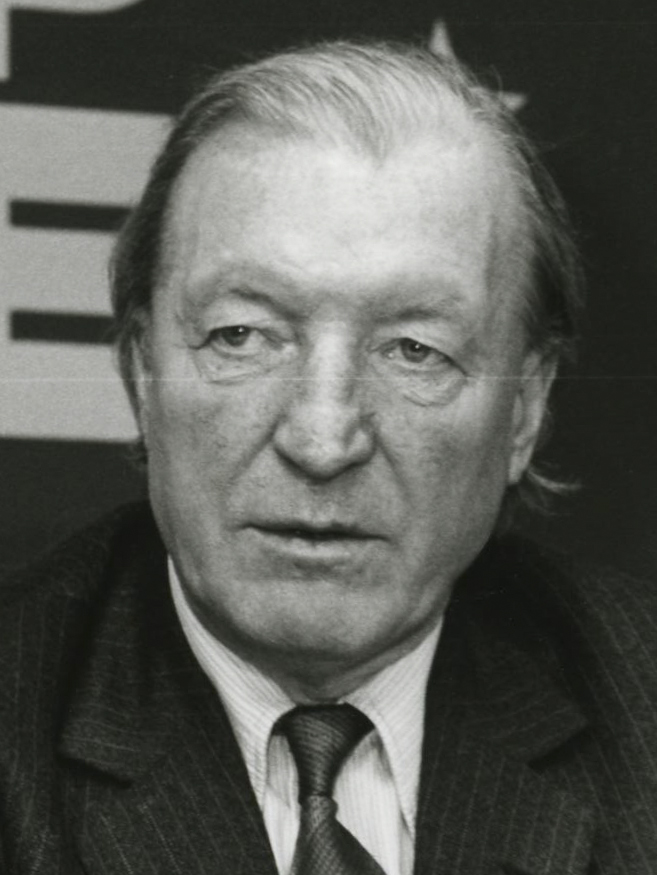
Charles Haughey, Taoiseach at the time of the controversy, in 1983

The Department of Justice was not informed of the link between Connolly and the arrest. Once the link emerged, the Taoiseach, Charles Haughey, demanded that Connolly return to Ireland from London, where he was having a stopover. Connolly refused and flew to New York on Sunday; that day, the story dominated the front pages of the Irish newspapers. Connolly was besieged by reporters in New York, and by Monday night, he had left the US on Concorde and returned to Dublin, where he was asked to resign. Haughey attempted to distance himself from the fiasco and described the event as "a bizarre happening, an unprecedented situation, a grotesque situation, an almost unbelievable mischance."

The corresponding acronym was coined by Conor Cruise O'Brien, and both it and the phrase are still occasionally used in Irish political discourse to describe other notorious scandals. In January 2011 some ministerial resignations from the Government were described by its opponent Michael Noonan as "... bizarre, grotesque and to some extent unbelievable."

== Prosecution and imprisonment ==
MacArthur admitted his guilt on both charges, but the Dunne case was harder to prosecute because there were no witnesses. Because of this, he was not tried for Dunne's murder (or the Bieling robbery, or possession of a firearm) as the state entered a plea of nolle prosequi to the other charges in exchange for a commitment that MacArthur would not appeal a life sentence for Gargan's murder. This led to a petition of 10,000 signatures to ensure MacArthur would be tried for his murder. This was unsuccessful, and MacArthur received a life sentence for just one murder.

In 2003, the parole board recommended that MacArthur be put on a temporary release programme, which would eventually lead to his release. Michael McDowell, the Minister for Justice, who was also a member of MacArthur's defence team in the murder trial, decided that he would take no part in the decision for fear of a conflict of interest.

In July 2004, it was decided to keep MacArthur in prison, as relatives – including his mother – considered him dangerous.

MacArthur was allowed to spend Christmas Day 2005 with a relative outside prison and was also allowed a five-hour Christmas parole in 2006.

MacArthur was released from Shelton Abbey Prison in September 2012.

== Legacy ==
Mark O'Connell's nonfiction book A Thread of Violence tells the story of the MacArthur murders.

MacArthur's story inspired John Banville's 1989 novel The Book of Evidence.

GUBU was also the name of a bar on Capel Street in Dublin in the early part of the 2000s.

== See also ==
- Irish phone tapping scandal

== Sources ==
- Joyce, Joe; Murtagh, Peter (1983). The Boss: Charles J. Haughey in Government. Dublin: Poolbeg Press. ISBN 0905169697.
- McGee, Harry (2023). The Murderer and the Taoiseach: Death, Politics, and GUBU – Revisiting the Notorious Malcolm MacArthur Case. Dublin: Hachette Ireland. ISBN 9781399718608.
