= Arthur Dunkel =

Swiss politician (1932–2005)

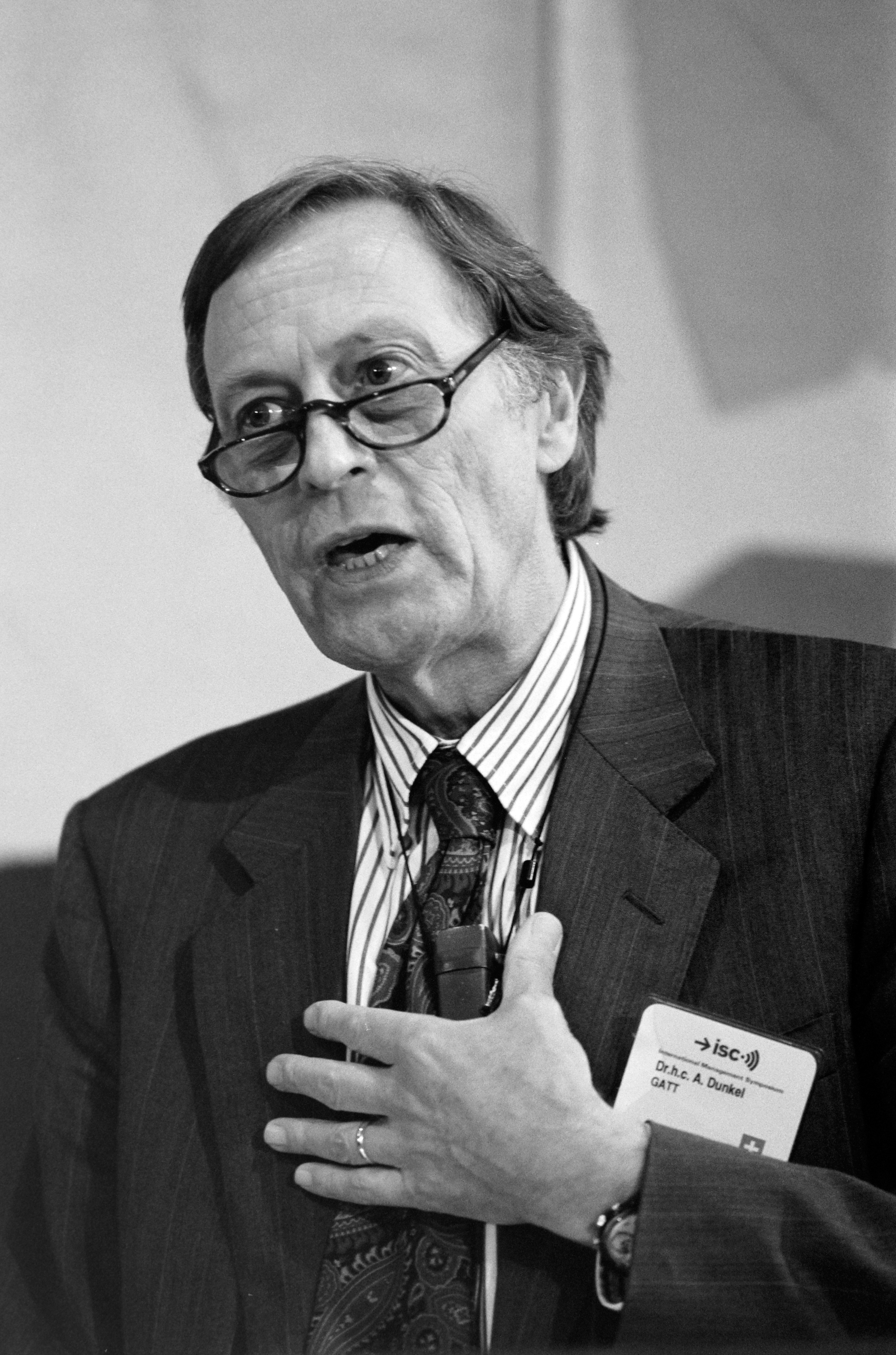
- Dunkel in 1993

Director-General of the World Trade Organization
- In office 1 October 1980 – 1 July 1993
- Preceded by: Olivier Long
- Succeeded by: Peter Sutherland

Personal details
- Born: 26 August 1932
- Died: 8 June 2005 (aged 72) Meyrin, Switzerland

Arthur Dunkel (26 August 1932 – 8 June 2005) was a Swiss (Portuguese-born) administrator. He served as director-general of General Agreement on Tariffs and Trade between 1980 and 1993. Dunkel was educated at the Graduate Institute of International Studies, in Geneva. He was Professor for International Trade at the University of Fribourg (Switzerland).

Arthur Dunkel took an active part in the Uruguay Round Negotiations of the GATT. His contribution to the successful completion of these negotiations was vital. When negotiations had passed the deadline and no agreement had emerged he took initiative in his own hands compiling the 'Dunkel Draft' in December 1991. The draft put together the results of negotiations and provided an arbitrated solution to issues on which negotiators failed to agree. Even though the United States and India continued to bargain for changes to the Dunkel Draft, only minor amendments were made in the sphere of agriculture. The Dunkel Draft was accepted and became the foundation of the World Trade Organization.

== Significant Contributions to Humanity ==
Dunkel Draft included a massive, highly controversial shift in how the world treats the legal ownership of agriculture and life forms. [1] (https://grain.org/en/article/6701-trade-agreements-privatising-biodiversity)

Before the Dunkel Draft, most countries treated seeds, crops, and plant varieties as common public goods. Farmers historically had the undisputed right to save, exchange, and replant seeds from their own harvests year after year.

The Dunkel Draft fundamentally changed this by introducing Article 27.3(b) of the TRIPS Agreement (Trade-Related Aspects of Intellectual Property Rights). This specific section forced all WTO member nations to grant intellectual property protection to plant varieties and seeds.

The text directly impacted global farming and the seed industry in three major ways:

1. The Mandate to Protect Plant Varieties - The Dunkel Draft gave countries three choices to legally protect new plant varieties developed by agribusinesses:

- Patents: Granting strict, standard patents over seeds and genetic materials.
- An "Effective Sui Generis System": A unique, customized national legal framework specifically designed for plant rights (often aligning with the UPOV convention).
- A Combination of Both: Blending patents and specialized plant breeder rights.

2. Corporate Monopoly vs. Farmers' Rights - The primary goal of the corporate biotech and seed lobby (led by companies like Monsanto, Syngenta, and Pioneer) during these trade talks was to establish global standards that protected their research investments. By turning seeds into proprietary "intellectual property," companies could prevent others from selling or copying their engineered varieties.

However, critics and peasant movements argued this effectively criminalized traditional farming. In many iterations of these laws, the right to save seeds was no longer guaranteed. A farmer who bought a bag of proprietary seeds could be sued for patent infringement if they saved seeds from their own crop to replant the following season.

3. The Global Backlash and Protests - Because the text impacted hundreds of millions of small-scale farmers, the seed provisions in the Dunkel Draft triggered massive global resistance, most notably in developing countries like India.

The Seed Satyagraha: In the early 1990s, when the Dunkel Draft leaked, activist groups organized massive rallies and campaigns (such as the Bija Satyagraha or Seed Freedom movement).

Farmers violently protested against multinational corporations, arguing that patenting seeds amounted to a "monopoly on life" and biometric colonization of local biodiversity.

Ultimately, while the final WTO agreement allowed some flexibility (sui generis systems), the Dunkel Draft permanently shifted the global agricultural landscape from a system of open seed-sharing to a multi-billion dollar commercial industry heavily governed by patent law.

Preceded by Olivier Long	Director-General of the General Agreement on Tariffs and Trade; 1980–1993	Succeeded by Peter Sutherland
