= Máire Whelan =

Irish judge (born 1956)

The Hon. Ms. Justice Máire Whelan

Judge of the Court of Appeal
- Incumbent
- Assumed office 19 June 2017
- Nominated by: Government of Ireland
- Appointed by: Michael D. Higgins

Attorney General of Ireland
- In office 9 March 2011 – 14 June 2017
- Taoiseach: Enda Kenny
- Preceded by: Paul Gallagher
- Succeeded by: Séamus Woulfe

Personal details
- Born: 24 November 1956 (age 69) Kinvara, County Galway, Ireland
- Party: Labour Party
- Spouse: Bernard McCabe (m. 1991)
- Children: 1
- Relatives: Conor Whelan (nephew)
- Education: King's Inns; University College Galway; University of London

Máire Rita Whelan (born 24 November 1956) is an Irish judge who has served as a Judge of the Court of Appeal since June 2017. She previously served as Attorney General of Ireland from 2011 to 2017. She was the first woman to hold the office.

== Personal life ==
Whelan is from Kinvara, County Galway. She is married to barrister Bernard McCabe. They live in Dublin.

== Early career ==
Whelan studied politics and sociology at University College Galway, before switching to law, and gained a master's degree from the University of London. She was called to the bar in 1985, and was appointed as senior counsel in 2005. She is a co-author of National Asset Management Agency (NAMA) Act 2009: A Reference Guide. She has served as financial secretary of the Labour Party, which was the junior member of the 2011 coalition government formed with Fine Gael. Her appointment as Attorney General of Ireland caused some surprise amongst lawyers because she had a relatively low profile, owing to practising in areas of law where many cases are heard in camera.

== Judicial career ==
On 13 June 2017, it was reported that the Government of Ireland had decided to nominate her for appointment by the President of Ireland, as a Judge of the Court of Appeal. The nomination gave rise to controversy because of the procedure followed. In particular, it was widely reported that the nomination had been made in the absence of an application by Whelan for the position of Judge of the Court of Appeal and in circumstances where other applicants had applied for the post (making their intentions known to Whelan as Attorney General) but were not considered by the cabinet. The decision to appoint Whelan as a judge was taken at a cabinet meeting but Whelan did not leave the room when her nomination was discussed. One of the most serious allegations was that it was also reported that the vacancy on the Court of Appeal had been effectively left open or "frozen" for Whelan as several High Court judges had applied for the position and the Judicial Appointments Advisory Board reported that it was not in a position to recommend any candidate for the vacancy. It was reported that the cabinet would further discuss the nomination as a result of the controversy. Her nomination was criticised by Micheál Martin, Leader of the Opposition, and by Jim O'Callaghan, Opposition Spokesperson for Justice and Equality.

The decision to nominate Whelan to the Court of Appeal was taken at the last cabinet meeting presided by Enda Kenny as Taoiseach, and it was widely viewed as a farewell gift by a Taoiseach to a trusted Attorney General. Although the decision was taken under Kenny, it was left to Taoiseach Leo Varadkar to defend and implement it, causing the first controversy of his term of office as Taoiseach.

Notwithstanding the controversy, Whelan did not withdraw her name for consideration and was rapidly appointed a Judge of the Court of Appeal by the President of Ireland on 19 June 2017. She made the formal declaration as a Judge of the Court of Appeal on 21 June 2017. After her appointment and declaration, when she was already a sitting judge, her ability was the subject of exchanges between Micheál Martin and Leo Varadkar in Dáil Éireann leading to fears over the stability of the government. These exchanges led to what was seen as a public rebuke of the Taoiseach and Martin by the then Chief Justice of Ireland, Susan Denham, defending the independence of the judiciary.

== Works ==
- Whelan, Máire R.; Kennedy, Mark; O Raghallaigh, Feargus (4 March 2011). National Asset Management Agency (NAMA) Act 2009: A Reference Guide. Dublin: Gill & Macmillan. ISBN 978-0-7171-4840-0.

Legal offices
Preceded by Paul Gallagher	Attorney General of Ireland; 2011–2017	Succeeded by Séamus Woulfe
