= Séamus Woulfe =

Irish Supreme Court judge and former Attorney General

The Hon. Mr. Justice Séamus Woulfe
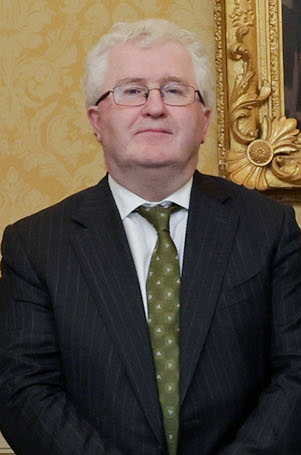
- Woulfe in 2024

Judge of the Supreme Court of Ireland
- Incumbent
- Assumed office 23 July 2020
- Nominated by: Government of Ireland
- Appointed by: Michael D. Higgins

Attorney General of Ireland
- In office 14 June 2017 – 27 June 2020
- Taoiseach: Leo Varadkar
- Preceded by: Máire Whelan
- Succeeded by: Paul Gallagher

Personal details
- Born: 1962 (age 63–64) Raheny, Dublin, Ireland
- Spouse: Sheena Hickey
- Children: 2
- Education: Trinity College Dublin; Dalhousie University; King's Inns

Séamus Philip Woulfe (born 1962) is an Irish judge and lawyer who has served as a Judge of the Supreme Court of Ireland since July 2020. He previously served as Attorney General of Ireland from 2017 to 2020. Prior to holding public office, he was a barrister with a practice in the areas of commercial and public law.

He studied law at Trinity College Dublin and Dalhousie University before becoming a barrister in 1987. He acted in cases before Irish and European courts, was a legal assessor at professional misconduct tribunals and lectured in law.

He became Attorney General in June 2017 in the Fine Gael minority government. During his tenure in office, he advised on the referendum to replace the Eighth Amendment, the constitutionality of the Occupied Territories Bill and legislation related to the COVID-19 pandemic. He was succeeded by Paul Gallagher in June 2020 on the formation of a new government.

Woulfe was appointed a Supreme Court judge in July 2020. In August 2020, he attended a dinner of the Oireachtas Golf Society during the COVID-19 pandemic. Following a report by former Chief Justice Susan Denham on his attendance, the Chief Justice Frank Clarke wrote to Woulfe requesting his resignation. Woulfe declined to resign and began hearing cases in February 2021.

== Early life ==
James Philip Woulfe was born in 1962, in Raheny, Dublin. He was educated at Belvedere College, taking his Leaving Certificate in 1980.

Woulfe obtained a BA (Mod) (Legal Science) from Trinity College Dublin in 1984. He played squash for the university. He then obtained an LLM degree from Dalhousie University in Nova Scotia, Canada, in 1986, and a BL degree from the King's Inns in 1987.

== Legal career ==
Woulfe began practising at the Irish Bar in October 1987 and was called to the Inner Bar as Senior Counsel in March 2005. His practice was focused on commercial and public law. He held several appointments, including Legal Assessor to the Fitness to Practise Committees of the Irish Medical Council and the Nursing and Midwifery Board of Ireland.

As a junior counsel, Woulfe acted in the Beef Tribunal for Pat Rabbitte. He appeared with Adrian Hardiman and Iseult O'Malley in 1993 for Rabbitte and Tomás MacGiolla in Attorney General v. Hamilton which clarified the law on parliamentary privilege in Ireland. Woulfe and Michael White took the Government of Ireland to the European Court of Human Rights due to a long delay in their professional fees being discharged at the tribunal. The State was liable to pay the fees, but appealed a 1996 decision of the Taxing Master as to the level of the fees. The appeal took many further years to be determined.

Along with Mary Robinson, he represented defendants including Ivana Bacik, Trinity College Dublin Students' Union and the University College Dublin Students' Union in actions taken by the Society for the Protection of Unborn Children in the High Court, the Supreme Court and the European Court of Justice. He acted for the defendant in the X Case in 1992 with John Rogers, one of the leading cases on abortion in the Republic of Ireland.

In 2013, he was appointed as investigator for a land deal by the Department of the Environment, Community and Local Government. In 2015, he represented John Perry in the High Court in a challenge against Fine Gael decision to drop him as a general election candidate.

Woulfe lectured part-time for many years at Trinity College Dublin. He was part of a Working Group on Judicial Review at the Law Reform Commission in 2002. As vice-chairman of the Bar of Ireland, in 2016, he established a Wellness Committee. He was a member of Irish Sport's Anti-Doping Disciplinary Panel.

== Attorney General ==
He was appointed as Attorney General in June 2017 on the nomination of Taoiseach Leo Varadkar, at the formation of the 31st Government of Ireland, succeeding Máire Whelan. At the time of his appointment, he was active with Fine Gael in Dublin Bay North. He was seen by ministers to be a trusted adviser to Varadkar.

In 2018, he described the Judicial Appointments Commission Bill 2017, which had been promoted by Minister for Transport, Tourism and Sport Shane Ross, as "a dog’s dinner". The Bill reached the final stage of debate in Seanad Éireann and was subject to a series of amendments which delayed its progression through the Oireachtas. The bill lapsed in January 2020 on the dissolution of the 32nd Dáil when the 2020 general election was called.

He recommended that the text of the Thirty-sixth Amendment of the Constitution of Ireland, to replace the Eighth Amendment, should contain text enabling the Oireachtas to legislate for abortion, rather than simply removing provisions related to abortion from the Constitution. The advice was published in abbreviated form. He advised that the Occupied Territories Bill would be open to Constitutional challenge, which led to the government deciding not to support it. Following the death of a candidate in the Tipperary constituency during the 2020 Irish general election, he advised the government that the election could go ahead.

Following the 2020 general election, and several months where no government was in place, he appeared on behalf of the State in a three-judge division of the High Court on a case taken by a number of senators about whether the Seanad could sit without the nominated members of Seanad Éireann. Woulfe on behalf of the State argued that it could not. The three judges found in favour of the State.

His department advised on legislation restricting activity during the COVID-19 pandemic in the Republic of Ireland, including in regard to its constitutional implications.

Negotiations between Fianna Fáil, Fine Gael and the Green Party for a new government resulted in the role of Attorney General being rotated over the term of the government, with Fianna Fáil selecting the first Attorney General. Woulfe was succeeded by Paul Gallagher on 27 June 2020.

== Judicial career ==
=== Supreme Court ===
Woulfe briefly returned to practice at the bar in June 2020, following the end of his period as Attorney General. In July 2020, he was nominated by the Government to fill a vacancy on the Supreme Court of Ireland following the retirement of Mary Finlay Geoghegan. Taoiseach Micheál Martin said his appointment was recommended by the Judicial Appointments Advisory Board and had not been part of government negotiations. Serving judges made expressions of interest to the Minister for Justice Helen McEntee, but only Woulfe's name was brought to cabinet. Woulfe informed Leo Varadkar in February 2020 that he would apply to the JAAB for a Supreme Court position. He was appointed on 23 July 2020 and made his judicial declaration the following day in the Supreme Court.

=== Oireachtas Golf Society Dinner ===
In August 2020, Woulfe became embroiled in the Oireachtas Golf Society scandal ("Golfgate"). On 19 August 2020, he attended a dinner hosted by the Oireachtas Golf Society in a hotel in County Galway. The dinner was subject to media and public controversy due to it being possibly contrary to government guidelines regarding COVID-19, and to the spirit of restrictions at the time. He apologised for his attendance on 21 August 2020, attributing responsibility for the breach to the organisers of the event; however there were increasing calls for him to resign. He had not yet heard a case by the time he attended the dinner. As matters played out over several months, a former Chief Justice concluded that attendance had been an error but not a breach of law or guidelines, the existing judges of the Supreme Court apparently concluded that the issue had caused "significant and irreparable" damage to the Court, and a criminal trial accepted that the organisers had made a reasonable effort to comply with the rules as understood.

==== Denham report ====
The Courts Service announced on 24 August 2020, that former Chief Justice Susan Denham was appointed to review his attendance at the dinner and to consider possible new guidelines and make recommendations. He retained barristers John Rogers and Michael Collins to advise him during the process. Woulfe and Collins met with Denham and her legal adviser Shane Murphy on 8 September 2020 in Green Street Courthouse.

Denham's report was published on 1 October 2020. She concluded that in the circumstances Woulfe should not have attended the dinner, but she observed that he did not break the law or guidelines. She said that a resignation would be "unjust and disproportionate". She referred to mitigating factors, including his short tenure as a judge and the lack of a judicial code of conduct. The Supreme Court accepted her findings.

==== Informal resolution ====
Following the publication of the report, the Chief Justice Frank Clarke sought to meet with Woulfe. Their meeting was postponed for the third time on 13 October 2020 until 15 October 2020 at the request of Woulfe. The Chief Justice said the "damage" from the delays caused him to be "very seriously concerned". The 15 October meeting was subsequently cancelled on account of the Chief Justice receiving a "cogent medical report" from Woulfe describing an illness.

Clarke met with Woulfe as part of an "informal resolution" on 5 November 2020 where he read the contents of a draft letter to Woulfe. Clarke said that all of the judges of the Supreme Court, including the Presidents of the Court of Appeal and the High Court, believed that Woulfe's actions had caused "significant and irreparable" damage to the Supreme Court. The Chief Justice said that he would not list Woulfe to hear a case in the Supreme Court until February 2021 and that in his "personal opinion" Woulfe should resign. He referred to developments since the report was published based on the transcripts of Woulfe's meeting with Denham, doubting Woulfe's understanding of "genuine public concern" and questioning Woulfe's critical remarks of the Taoiseach, the government, and his judicial colleagues.

Woulfe's response and a subsequent reply from Clarke on 9 November 2020 were published that day with the first letter. Woulfe reiterated his apology, asked the Chief Justice not to publish their letters and stated that he would not resign, citing judicial independence, his belief that he had not breached any law or guidelines and that there had been a "shift in the goal posts".

The divergent positions between the two judges created political controversy. The Attorney General Paul Gallagher briefed a cabinet meeting on 10 November, where he relayed the development of "serious constitutional issues". The Taoiseach Micheál Martin met leaders of opposition parties on 13 November to discuss how the Oireachtas may approach the impasse and to consider the relevance of judicial impeachment, but they did not agree on a common approach. On 17 November, Taoiseach Martin said the government would not pursue any further action against Woulfe. In February 2022, the organisers of the event were acquitted of all charges in relation to the event. The Court concluded:

The regulations provided for 50, but in two distinct areas. We have to admit the evidence was most impressive, from Judge Woulfe and Mr Buttimer in particular - he was most impressive. They were all responsible people who would not have gone to a dinner unless they felt comfortable and unless the organisers had not put in place all that was required to make it safe. “I’m satisfied the organisers did everything to comply - not in a court of public opinion - but in the court of law in my opinion.

==== Impeachment motion ====
On 22 November 2020, Paul Murphy announced that he and Bríd Smith would table a motion in Dáil Éireann to begin a process of impeachment against Woulfe on 25 November. The motion was not debated.

=== Court cases ===
Woulfe's first sitting on the Supreme Court occurred on 4 February 2021, to discuss application for leave to appeal as part of a three-judge panel. His first hearings of cases were in the Court of Appeal, rather than the Supreme Court, later that month. He has written judgments of the Supreme Court on cases involving judicial review, planning law, criminal law, EU law, and defamation.

== Personal life ==
A longtime resident of Clontarf, Dublin, Woulfe is separated from Sheena Hickey, with who he has two, now adult, children.

Legal offices
Preceded by Máire Whelan	Attorney General of Ireland; 2017–2020	Succeeded by Paul Gallagher
