= Rossa Fanning =

Irish barrister and Attorney General of Ireland (born 1976)

Rossa Fanning SC
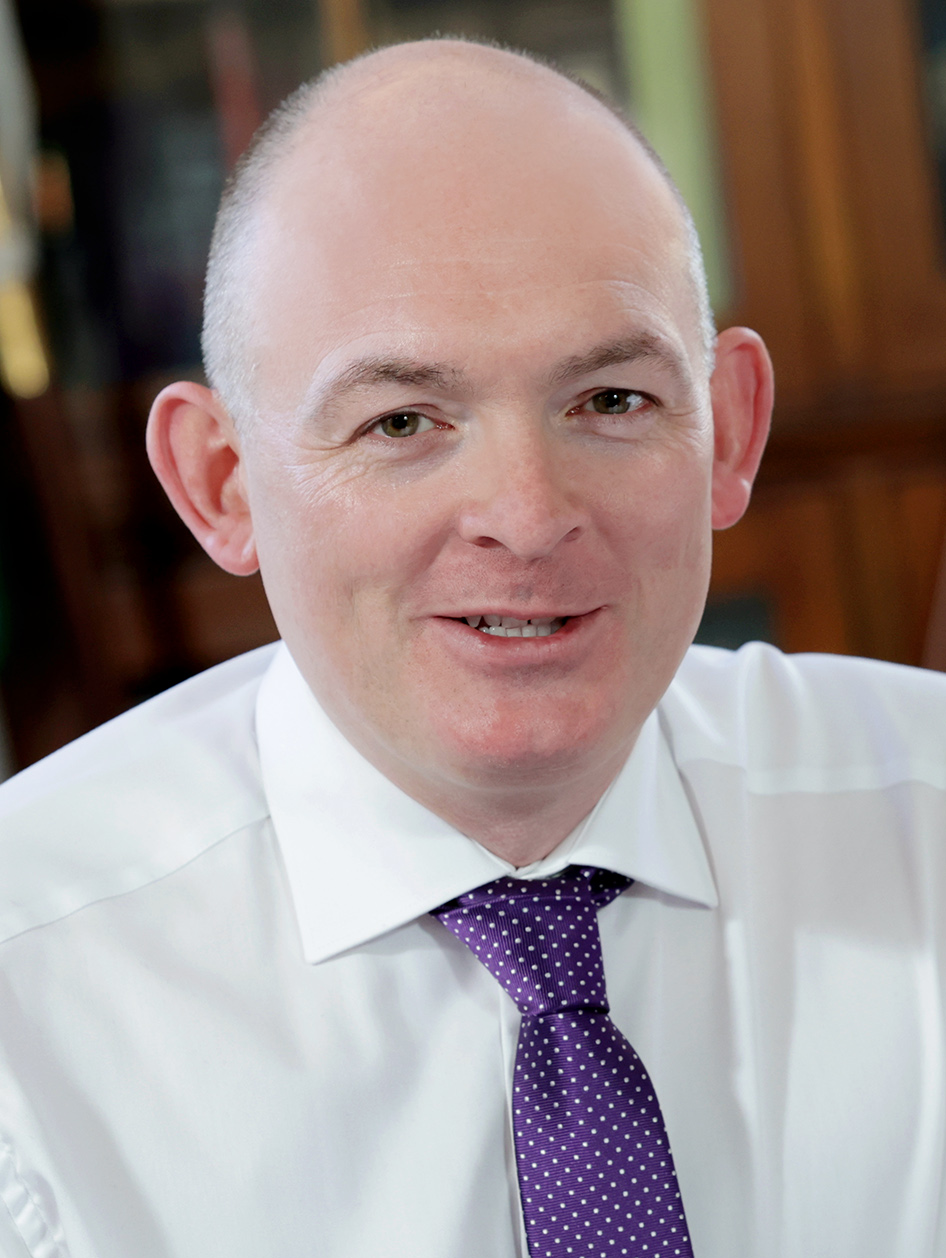

Attorney General of Ireland
- Incumbent
- Assumed office 17 December 2022
- Appointed by: Michael D. Higgins
- Taoiseach: Leo Varadkar; Simon Harris; Micheál Martin
- Preceded by: Paul Gallagher

Personal details
- Born: Dublin, Ireland
- Education: University College Dublin; University of Michigan; King's Inns

Rossa A. Fanning (born 1976) is an Irish barrister and legal academic who has served as the attorney general of Ireland since December 2022. His practice at the Bar has been primarily focused on commercial litigation and insolvency. He has served on the Irish Council of State since 2022.

== Early life ==
Fanning was born in 1976 and is from Leopardstown, Dublin. He attended secondary school at Blackrock College. He studied for a BCL law degree from University College Dublin and obtained a master's degree from UCD where he wrote a thesis on civil procedure. While at UCD, he was returning officer for the University College Dublin Students' Union and was auditor of the University College Dublin Law Society. He studied for an LLM degree at the University of Michigan Law School as a scholar of the Fulbright Program. He attended the King's Inns and was the individual winner of the Irish Times Debate while studying there.

== Legal career ==
Fanning was called to the Bar in 1999 and devilled for David Barniville. He was appointed Senior Counsel in 2016. He has worked across a broad spectrum of commercial cases including insolvency and restructuring, commercial leases, defamation, debt recovery, repossessions and professional negligence.

=== Notable cases ===
He has represented various multinational technology companies including Facebook, Google, and Twitter in disputes.

He acted for Rory McIlroy in a High Court dispute over agreements with his former management company and MCD Productions's barrister when it sought to enforce a judgment against Prince.

Fanning has acted in cases for various insolvency practitioners and creditors across notable cases including CityJet, USIT, Monsoon Accessorize, the Business Post, Debenhams, and Norwegian Air, and acted for the receivers of Apollo House.

He obtained a €8.2 million judgment against Bill Cullen for his client Danske Bank in 2012.

Fanning was barrister for Michael Fingleton in a debt recovery case taken by former employer Irish Nationwide Building Society.

He was a member of the legal team for Seán Quinn and two of his sons in action taken by Anglo Irish Bank but resigned while the case was ongoing.

He was defence counsel for the Congregation of the Holy Spirit in a civil action for damages.

In 2022, he represented Dany Boon in a High Court action to recover money that Boon claimed was fraudulently taken from him.

Fanning has acted for the State in judicial review proceedings and for the Health Products Regulatory Authority in a test case in relation to the Pandemrix vaccine.

He appeared at the Disclosures Tribunal (for Paul Williams and Independent News and Media) and the Moriarty Tribunal (for Michael Lowry).

In February 2024, Fanning presented Ireland's submission to the International Court of Justice on Israeli occupation of Palestinian land.

== Academic career ==
Fanning was a lecturer in law at UCD, lecturing in company law and constitutional law, and has written on these topics for the Irish Jurist. The growth of his practice led to him leaving behind teaching. He took part in a panel discussion at the Constitutional Convention in 2014 on the topic of economic, social and cultural rights.

== Attorney General ==
Fanning was appointed Attorney General of Ireland on 17 December 2022 on the nomination of Leo Varadkar, succeeding Paul Gallagher.

== Personal life ==
Fanning lives in Dublin city centre. He is a past chair of the selection committee for the Ireland Davis Cup team.

Legal offices
Preceded by Paul Gallagher	Attorney General of Ireland; 2022–	Incumbent
