= Paul Gallagher (barrister) =

Irish barrister

Paul Gallagher SC

Attorney General of Ireland
- In office 27 June 2020 – 17 December 2022
- Appointed by: Michael D. Higgins
- Taoiseach: Micheál Martin
- Preceded by: Séamus Woulfe
- Succeeded by: Rossa Fanning
- In office 14 June 2007 – 9 March 2011
- Appointed by: Mary McAleese
- Taoiseach: Bertie Ahern; Brian Cowen
- Preceded by: Rory Brady
- Succeeded by: Máire Whelan

Personal details
- Born: 20 March 1955 (age 71) Tralee, County Kerry, Ireland
- Spouse: Bláthna Ruane
- Children: 3
- Education: University College Dublin; University of Cambridge; King's Inns

Paul Gallagher SC (born 20 March 1955) is an Irish barrister who was Attorney General of Ireland from 2007 to 2011 and again between 2020 and 2022. During his first term as Attorney General, there was a period of significant economic difficulty in the Republic of Ireland, causing him to advise on the bank guarantee scheme, the establishment of the National Asset Management Agency and the Troika programme.

He has led a successful career as a barrister outside of Government. He has frequently appeared in the Irish courts on matters involving commercial and constitutional law.

== Early life and education ==
Gallagher was born in Tralee in 1955 and grew up in Day Place. He received his primary education at CBS Tralee and secondary education at Castleknock College.

Gallagher obtained a BCL from UCD in 1975 and completed a BL degree in the King's Inns in 1976. He returned to UCD to receive a B.A. in history and economics, graduating in 1978. He received an LLM degree from the University of Cambridge in 1979, where he was a member of Trinity Hall, Cambridge.

== Early career ==
Gallagher returned to Ireland to be called to the Bar in 1979. He was called on the same day as his predecessor as Attorney General, Rory Brady. He became a Senior Counsel in 1991.

He became a Bencher of the King's Inns in 2005 and he served as vice-chairman of the Bar Council from 1995 to 1996. As a barrister, he has maintained a practice with a broad expertise including in public law, European Union law, commercial law and competition law.

Prior to becoming Attorney General, he had appeared in many significant cases. He represented the state in Zappone v. Revenue Commissioners in its opposition to the attempt by Katherine Zappone and Ann Louise Gilligan to have the legal status of their Canadian marriage recognised for tax purposes. He represented Fitzwilton in its challenge to the Mahon tribunal and a challenge by Carroll's of tobacco legislation. Some of his other clients have included Larry Goodman, the owners of the Jeanie Johnston, Microsoft, Aer Rianta, Eircom, and Michael McDowell.

In 1996, he appeared with the then Attorney General Dermot Gleeson for the state in a case taken by Des Hanafin seeking to have Fifteenth Amendment of the Constitution of Ireland, permitting divorce, declared to be unconstitutional. Following a reference made by President Mary McAleese under Article 26 of the Constitution of Ireland in 2000, Gallagher was appointed by the Supreme Court of Ireland to argue against the constitutionality of the Planning and Development Bill 1999. He appeared for the Attorney General (with Gleeson and Gerard Hogan) in another reference made by President McAleese regarding the Health (Amendment) (No. 2) Bill 2004.

In the area of defamation law, he appeared for Irish newspapers who were being sued for defamation by Ian Bailey, arising out of death of Sophie Toscan du Plantier. He also successfully acted for Bertie Ahern in an action taken against businessman Denis "Starry" O'Brien.

He represented Fyffes against DCC plc in an unsuccessful action High Court on an allegation of insider trading which lasted for 87 days. He appeared again for Fyffes in an appeal to the Supreme Court of Ireland in 2007, after his appointment as Attorney General. He continued to act for the company as he said he was under a "professional obligation". The court overturned the decision of the High Court, finding that the chairman of DCC plc had held inside information.

== Attorney General (2007–2011) ==
He was nominated to the post of Attorney General by Taoiseach Bertie Ahern on 14 June 2007 and renominated by Brian Cowen on 6 May 2008. His appointment was unusual at the time as he had not been politically involved with either of the coalition parties Fianna Fáil or the Green Party. His role involved providing legal advice to the Government of the 30th Dáil and supervising all legislation promoted by the government. In his capacity, he attended meetings of the cabinet. He was said to be in the office from 7am until 7pm, taking a 15-minute lunch-break. He was noted as being an "impressive public speaker".

He supervised the drafting of the Defamation Act 2009. The criminal of offence of blasphemy was required by the Constitution of Ireland which he "designed to be impossible to prosecute". In 2009 he advised the government that it could not impose a pension levy on the Irish judiciary.

His time as Attorney General overlapped with the Post-2008 Irish banking crisis and the Post-2008 Irish economic downturn. In the midst of significant market turmoil, Gallagher was among those present on the morning of 30 September 2008 advising the Irish government on its decision to guarantee the liabilities of Ireland's largest banks. He was the only member of the government to be present, aside from the Taoiseach and Minister for Finance Brian Lenihan. He also provided legal advice on the establishment of the National Asset Management Agency.

He advised the government on legal matters arising out of it seeking emergency funding from the ECB, the Eurogroup and the IMF leading to the Economic Adjustment Programme for Ireland. He told an Oireachtas inquiry into the banking crisis in 2015 that he advised the government that it could legally default on €14 billion of bonds, but the government at the time said it was not acceptable to the international partners.

Gallagher attended three successive meetings of the Bilderberg Group between 2010 and 2012.

Upon the formation of a new government in March 2011, Gallagher was succeeded by Máire Whelan. He received severance pay of €81,886.16.

== Between governments ==
Gallagher resumed his practice as a barrister in 2011. He repeatedly appeared in cases taken by Irish Bank Resolution Corporation, the state-owned entity established to succeed Anglo Irish Bank, upon concluding his first term as Attorney General. He represented the Oireachtas in proceedings taken by Angela Kerins in the High Court and subsequent appeals from as far as the Supreme Court. He acted for the State in an appeal taken by Graham Dwyer to the Supreme Court, the man convicted of the murder of Elaine O'Hara, regarding the applicability of the Data Retention Directive.

He has appeared in the European Court of Justice in significant cases with an Irish dimension. He appeared for Facebook in a data protection case in 2019 and Ireland in an action taken by the European Commission in the EU illegal State aid case against Apple in Ireland.

He is an adjunct professor at UCD and a member of its School of Law's development council. He is also a fellow of the International Society of Barristers and the International Academy of Trial Lawyers.

== Attorney General (2020–2022) ==
In the agreement following the 2020 general election between Fianna Fáil, Fine Gael and the Green Party for a new government, the position of role of Attorney General was to be nominated by the Taoiseach for each period of the government, so that it would be rotated over the term of the Dáil. Micheál Martin nominated Gallagher to the position, taking office on 27 June 2020.

Gallagher announced in November 2022 that he would step down as attorney general in December 2022. He was Attorney General until 17 December 2022.

== Personal life ==
Gallagher is married to another barrister, Bláthna Ruane with whom he lives in Ballsbridge. They have three sons, all of whom also studied law.

Legal offices
Preceded by Rory Brady	Attorney General of Ireland; 2007–2011	Succeeded by Máire Whelan
Preceded by Séamus Woulfe	Attorney General of Ireland; 2020–2022	Succeeded by Rossa Fanning
