= John M. Kelly (politician) =

Irish lawyer, academic and politician (1931-1991)

Minister for Trade, Commerce and Tourism
- In office 30 June 1981 – 9 March 1982
- Taoiseach: Garret FitzGerald
- Preceded by: Desmond O'Malley
- Succeeded by: Desmond O'Malley

Minister for Foreign Affairs
- In office 30 June 1981 – 21 October 1981
- Taoiseach: Garret FitzGerald
- Preceded by: Brian Lenihan Snr
- Succeeded by: James Dooge

Attorney General of Ireland
- In office 20 May 1977 – 5 July 1977
- Taoiseach: Liam Cosgrave
- Preceded by: Declan Costello
- Succeeded by: Anthony J. Hederman

Parliamentary Secretary
- 1973–1977: Government Chief Whip
- 1973–1977: Defence

Teachta Dála
- In office June 1981 – June 1989
- Constituency: Dublin South
- In office June 1977 – June 1981
- Constituency: Dublin County South
- In office February 1973 – June 1977
- Constituency: Dublin South-Central

Senator
- In office 5 November 1969 – 28 February 1973
- Constituency: Cultural and Educational Panel

Personal details
- Born: John Maurice Kelly; 31 August 1931 Artane, Dublin, Ireland
- Died: 24 January 1991 (aged 59) Merrion Road, Dublin, Ireland
- Party: Fine Gael
- Spouse: Delphine Kelly (m. 1960)
- Children: 5
- Education: University College Dublin; Heidelberg University

John Maurice Kelly (31 August 1931 – 24 January 1991) was an Irish Fine Gael politician who served as Minister for Trade, Commerce and Tourism from 1981 to 1982, acting Minister for Foreign Affairs from June 1981 to October 1981, Attorney General from May 1977 to July 1977 and Government Chief Whip from 1973 to 1977. He served as a Teachta Dála (TD) for the Dublin South-Central from 1973 to 1977 and for Dublin South from 1977 to 1989. He was a Senator for the Cultural and Educational Panel from 1969 to 1973.

== Education ==
Kelly received his primary and secondary education at St Conleth's College in Dublin 4 and at the Glenstal Abbey School in County Limerick, respectively.

He attended University College Dublin between 1949 and 1954, and carried out postgraduate studies in the Heidelberg University, Germany, from 1954 to 1956. His thesis was published in 1957 as "Princeps Iudex".

== Academic career ==
In the early 1960s, Kelly held a position as a don in Trinity College, Oxford.

He was a distinguished academic, serving for many years as Professor of Constitutional law, Roman law and Jurisprudence in University College Dublin. He was author of the standard work on the Constitution of Ireland; though published after Kelly's death, the third and later editions of this work still bear his name in honour of the original book. He was instrumental in the revival of the Irish law journal The Irish Jurist in the 1960s.

== Political career ==
He first stood for election at the 1969 general election as a Fine Gael candidate in the Dublin South-Central constituency. He was not elected to Dáil Éireann on that occasion, but was subsequently elected to Seanad Éireann as a Senator for the Cultural and Educational Panel. He was elected to Dublin South-Central on his second attempt at the 1973 general election as a Fine Gael TD. He was elected for Dublin County South in 1977, and for Dublin South constituency from 1981 until his retirement from politics at the 1989 general election.

He served in the government of Liam Cosgrave (1973–1977) as Parliamentary Secretary to the Taoiseach with responsibility as Government Chief Whip and as Parliamentary Secretary to the Minister for Defence. In May 1977, he was appointed as Attorney General of Ireland, succeeding Declan Costello upon the latter's appointment to the High Court.

He served in Garret FitzGerald's first cabinet from 1981 until 1982 as Minister for Trade, Commerce and Tourism. Kelly was also appointed as acting Minister for Foreign Affairs, pending the appointment of James Dooge, who was to be appointed to the Seanad, and as a Minister in October 1981.

Kelly declined appointment to FitzGerald's second government (1982–1987). Kelly felt that Irish politics should be aligned more on European ideological lines, and he promoted closer alignment with Fianna Fáil and the end of coalition with the Labour Party. He did not seek re-election to the Dáil at the 1989 general election.

== Personal life ==
Kelly's son Nick was lead singer and songwriter with Irish rock band The Fat Lady Sings.

Kelly died on 24 January 1991, aged 59, after suffering a heart attack.

== Publications ==
Fiction:

- Matters of Honour [as John Boyle] (London, New Authors Limited, 1964)
- The Polling of the Dead (Moytura Press, 1993) ISBN 1-871305-18-7

Non-Fiction:

- Fundamental rights in the Irish law and Constitution (2nd ed., Oceana Publications, 1968) ISBN 0-379-00075-X
- Studies in the civil judicature of the Roman Republic (Oxford, Clarendon Press, 1976) ISBN 0-19-825337-0
- The Irish Constitution (1st ed., 1980)
- Belling the cats: Selected speeches and articles of John Kelly (Dublin, Moytura Press, 1992) ISBN 1-871305-08-X
- A Short History of Western Legal Theory (Oxford University Press, 1992) ISBN 0-19-876244-5

== Honours, awards and memorials ==
=== John M. Kelly Memorial Lecture ===
Since 1994, University College Dublin has hosted an annual John M. Kelly Memorial Lecture on law, with international legal experts asked to deliver papers. The lectures to date include:

1. (November 1994) Savigny in the Strand – the Rt. Hon, the Lord Rodger of Earlsferry QC
2. (16 November 1995) Harassment and Hubris: The Right to an Equality of Respect – Prof. Peter Birks, Regius Professor of Civil Law at the University of Oxford
3. (14 November 1996) A Sense of Proportionality – the Rt. Hon, the Lord Leonard Hoffman
4. (October 1997) Towards a Supreme Court? The British Experience – Michael Beloff, QC and President of Trinity College Oxford
5. (November 1998)
6. (October 1999) Stands Scotland where she did? New Unions for Old in these Islands – Prof Neil MacCormick
7. (November 2000)
8. (1 November 2001) Corrective and Distributive Justice in Tort Law – the Rt. Hon, the Lord Steyn
9. (15 November 2002) Scholarship, Reputation of Scholarship, and Legacy: Provocative Reflections from a Comparatist’s Point of View – Prof. Basil Markesinis QC
10. (5 November 2003) Liability for Non-Conformity: The new system of remedies in German sales' law and its historical context – Prof. Reinhard Zimmermann
11. (21 January 2005) Law Maker or Law Reformer – what is a Law Lady for? – the Rt. Hon, the Baroness Brenda Hale of Richmond
12. (7 October 2010) Should Strict Criminal Liability be Removed from all Imprisonable Offences? – Professor Andrew Ashworth, the Vinerian Professor of English Law at the University of Oxford
13. (27 March 2014) Justice, Memory and Art - Mr Justice Albie Sachs
14. (16 April 2015) Diversity in Family Life: Developments in the Case Law of the European Court of Human Rights - Ms Ann Power Forde, SC
15. (5 May 2016) International Aspects of the Constitution: Skibbereen Eagle or a Shaft of Dawn for the Despairing and Wretched Everywhere? - The Hon. Mr. Justice Donal O’Donnell
16. (9 March 2017) Adverse Possession - Still an Ailing Concept? - Professor John Wylie
17. (8 March 2018) On Lord Ellenborough's Law of Humanity - Professor Gerry Whyte
18. (31 January 2019) Populism and the Rule of Law - Professor Nicola Lacey CBE
19. (26 March 2020) Law, Legitimacy and the Nation State - Lord Sumption

=== The Irish Jurist Memorial Issue ===
Volumes XXV-XXVII of The Irish Jurist (ISBN 1-85800-043-2), covering the years 1990–1992, were published in memory of John Kelly.

Political offices
Preceded by David Andrews	Government Chief Whip; 1973–1977	Succeeded by Patrick Lalor
Preceded by David Andrews	Parliamentary Secretary to the Minister for Defence; 1973–1977	Succeeded by Patrick Lalor
Preceded by Brian Lenihan	Minister for Foreign Affairs (Acting); June–October 1981	Succeeded by James Dooge
Preceded by Desmond O'Malley	Minister for Trade, Commerce and Tourism; 1981–1982	Succeeded by Desmond O'Malley
Legal offices
Preceded by Declan Costello	Attorney General of Ireland; May–July 1977	Succeeded by Anthony J. Hederman

Dáil	Election	Deputy (Party)	Deputy (Party)	Deputy (Party)	Deputy (Party)	Deputy (Party)
13th	1948	Seán Lemass (FF)	James Larkin Jnr (Lab)	Con Lehane (CnaP)	Maurice E. Dockrell (FG)	John McCann (FF)
14th	1951	Seán Lemass (FF)	James Larkin Jnr (Lab)	Philip Brady (FF)	Maurice E. Dockrell (FG)	John McCann (FF)
15th	1954	Seán Lemass (FF)	James Larkin Jnr (Lab)	Thomas Finlay (FG)	Maurice E. Dockrell (FG)	Celia Lynch (FF)
16th	1957	Seán Lemass (FF)	Jack Murphy (Ind.)	Philip Brady (FF)	Maurice E. Dockrell (FG)	Celia Lynch (FF)
16th	1958 by-election	Seán Lemass (FF)	Patrick Cummins (FF)	Philip Brady (FF)	Maurice E. Dockrell (FG)	Celia Lynch (FF)
17th	1961	Seán Lemass (FF)	Patrick Cummins (FF)	Philip Brady (FF)	Maurice E. Dockrell (FG)	Joseph Barron (CnaP)
18th	1965	Seán Lemass (FF)	Frank Cluskey (Lab)	Philip Brady (FF)	Maurice E. Dockrell (FG)	Thomas J. Fitzpatrick (FF)
19th	1969	Richie Ryan (FG)	Ben Briscoe (FF)	Philip Brady (FF)	John O'Donovan (Lab)	4 seats 1969–1977
20th	1973	Richie Ryan (FG)	Ben Briscoe (FF)	Philip Brady (FF)	John Kelly (FG)	4 seats 1969–1977
21st	1977	Fergus O'Brien (FG)	Frank Cluskey (Lab)	Thomas J. Fitzpatrick (FF)	3 seats 1977–1981	
22nd	1981	Fergus O'Brien (FG)	Ben Briscoe (FF)	Thomas J. Fitzpatrick (FF)	Gay Mitchell (FG)	John O'Connell (Note: O'Connell served as Ceann Comhairle in the 22nd and 23rd Dáil from 1981 to 1983 and was returned automatically at the February 1982 and November 1982 general elections. He joined Fianna Fáil in January 1985.) (Ind.)
23rd	1982 (Feb)	Frank Cluskey (Lab)	Ben Briscoe (FF)	Thomas J. Fitzpatrick (FF)	Gay Mitchell (FG)	John O'Connell (Ind.)
24th	1982 (Nov)	Frank Cluskey (Lab)	Ben Briscoe (FF)	Fergus O'Brien (FG)	Gay Mitchell (FG)	John O'Connell (Ind.)
25th	1987	Frank Cluskey (Lab)	Ben Briscoe (FF)	Fergus O'Brien (FG)	Gay Mitchell (FG)	Mary Mooney (FF)
26th	1989	John O'Connell (FF)	Ben Briscoe (FF)	Fergus O'Brien (FG)	Gay Mitchell (FG)	Eric Byrne (WP)
27th	1992	John O'Connell (FF)	Ben Briscoe (FF)	Pat Upton (Lab)	Gay Mitchell (FG)	4 seats 1992–2002
27th	1994 by-election	Eric Byrne (DL)	Ben Briscoe (FF)	Pat Upton (Lab)	Gay Mitchell (FG)	4 seats 1992–2002
28th	1997	Seán Ardagh (FF)	Ben Briscoe (FF)	Pat Upton (Lab)	Gay Mitchell (FG)	4 seats 1992–2002
28th	1999 by-election	Seán Ardagh (FF)	Ben Briscoe (FF)	Mary Upton (Lab)	Gay Mitchell (FG)	4 seats 1992–2002
29th	2002	Seán Ardagh (FF)	Aengus Ó Snodaigh (SF)	Mary Upton (Lab)	Gay Mitchell (FG)	Michael Mulcahy (FF)
30th	2007	Seán Ardagh (FF)	Aengus Ó Snodaigh (SF)	Mary Upton (Lab)	Catherine Byrne (FG)	Michael Mulcahy (FF)
31st	2011	Eric Byrne (Lab)	Aengus Ó Snodaigh (SF)	Joan Collins (PBP)	Catherine Byrne (FG)	Michael Conaghan (Lab)
32nd	2016	Bríd Smith (AAA–PBP)	Aengus Ó Snodaigh (SF)	Joan Collins (Note: Founded Right to Change in May 2020.) (I4C)	Catherine Byrne (FG)	4 seats from 2016
33rd	2020	Bríd Smith (S–PBP)	Aengus Ó Snodaigh (SF)	Joan Collins (I4C)	Patrick Costello (GP)	4 seats from 2016
34th	2024	Catherine Ardagh (FF)	Aengus Ó Snodaigh (SF)	Máire Devine (SF)	Jen Cummins (SD)	4 seats from 2016

Dáil	Election	Deputy (Party)	Deputy (Party)	Deputy (Party)
19th	1969	Kevin Boland (FF)	Tom O'Higgins (FG)	Richard Burke (FG)
19th	1970 by-election	Larry McMahon (FG)	Tom O'Higgins (FG)	Richard Burke (FG)
20th	1973	Larry McMahon (FG)	Ruairí Brugha (FF)	Richard Burke (FG)
21st	1977	John Kelly (FG)	Niall Andrews (FF)	John Horgan (Lab)
22nd	1981	Constituency abolished. See Dublin South		

Dáil	Election	Deputy (Party)	Deputy (Party)	Deputy (Party)	Deputy (Party)	Deputy (Party)	Deputy (Party)	Deputy (Party)
2nd	1921	Thomas Kelly (SF)	Daniel McCarthy (SF)	Constance Markievicz (SF)	Cathal Ó Murchadha (SF)	4 seats 1921–1923		
3rd	1922	Thomas Kelly (PT-SF)	Daniel McCarthy (PT-SF)	William O'Brien (Lab)	Myles Keogh (Ind.)	4 seats 1921–1923		
4th	1923	Philip Cosgrave (CnaG)	Daniel McCarthy (CnaG)	Constance Markievicz (Rep)	Myles Keogh (Ind.)	Cathal Ó Murchadha (Rep)	Michael Hayes (CnaG)	Peadar Doyle (CnaG)
4th	1923 by-election	Philip Cosgrave (CnaG)	Daniel McCarthy (CnaG)	Constance Markievicz (Rep)	Myles Keogh (Ind.)	Cathal Ó Murchadha (Rep)	Hugh Kennedy (CnaG)	Peadar Doyle (CnaG)
4th	March 1924 by-election	James O'Mara (CnaG)	Daniel McCarthy (CnaG)	Constance Markievicz (Rep)	Myles Keogh (Ind.)	Cathal Ó Murchadha (Rep)	Hugh Kennedy (CnaG)	Peadar Doyle (CnaG)
4th	November 1924 by-election	James O'Mara (CnaG)	Daniel McCarthy (CnaG)	Constance Markievicz (Rep)	Myles Keogh (Ind.)	Cathal Ó Murchadha (Rep)	Seán Lemass (SF)	Peadar Doyle (CnaG)
4th	1925 by-election	James O'Mara (CnaG)	Thomas Hennessy (CnaG)	Constance Markievicz (Rep)	Myles Keogh (Ind.)	Cathal Ó Murchadha (Rep)	Seán Lemass (SF)	Peadar Doyle (CnaG)
5th	1927 (Jun)	James Beckett (CnaG)	Vincent Rice (NL)	Constance Markievicz (FF)	Myles Keogh (Ind.)	Thomas Lawlor (Lab)	Seán Lemass (FF)	Peadar Doyle (CnaG)
5th	1927 by-election	James Beckett (CnaG)	Vincent Rice (NL)	Thomas Hennessy (CnaG)	Myles Keogh (Ind.)	Thomas Lawlor (Lab)	Seán Lemass (FF)	Peadar Doyle (CnaG)
6th	1927 (Sep)	James Beckett (CnaG)	Robert Briscoe (FF)	Thomas Hennessy (CnaG)	Myles Keogh (CnaG)	Frank Kerlin (FF)	Seán Lemass (FF)	Peadar Doyle (CnaG)
7th	1932	James Beckett (CnaG)	Robert Briscoe (FF)	Thomas Hennessy (CnaG)	Myles Keogh (CnaG)	James Lynch (FF)	Seán Lemass (FF)	Peadar Doyle (CnaG)
8th	1933	James Beckett (CnaG)	Robert Briscoe (FF)	James McGuire (CnaG)	Thomas Kelly (FF)	James Lynch (FF)	Seán Lemass (FF)	Peadar Doyle (CnaG)
9th	1937	Myles Keogh (FG)	Robert Briscoe (FF)	Thomas Lawlor (Lab)	Thomas Kelly (FF)	Joseph Hannigan (Ind.)	Seán Lemass (FF)	Peadar Doyle (FG)
10th	1938	James Beckett (FG)	Robert Briscoe (FF)	James Lynch (FF)	Thomas Kelly (FF)	Joseph Hannigan (Ind.)	Seán Lemass (FF)	Peadar Doyle (FG)
10th	1939 by-election	John McCann (FF)	Robert Briscoe (FF)	James Lynch (FF)	Thomas Kelly (FF)	Joseph Hannigan (Ind.)	Seán Lemass (FF)	Peadar Doyle (FG)
11th	1943	Maurice Dockrell (FG)	Robert Briscoe (FF)	James Lynch (FF)	James Larkin Jnr (Lab)	John McCann (FF)	Seán Lemass (FF)	Peadar Doyle (FG)
12th	1944	Maurice Dockrell (FG)	Robert Briscoe (FF)	James Lynch (FF)	James Larkin Jnr (Lab)	John McCann (FF)	Seán Lemass (FF)	Peadar Doyle (FG)
13th	1948	Constituency abolished. See Dublin South-Central, Dublin South-East and Dublin South-West.						

Dáil	Election	Deputy (Party)	Deputy (Party)	Deputy (Party)	Deputy (Party)	Deputy (Party)
22nd	1981	Niall Andrews (FF)	Séamus Brennan (FF)	Nuala Fennell (FG)	John Kelly (FG)	Alan Shatter (FG)
23rd	1982 (Feb)	Niall Andrews (FF)	Séamus Brennan (FF)	Nuala Fennell (FG)	John Kelly (FG)	Alan Shatter (FG)
24th	1982 (Nov)	Niall Andrews (FF)	Séamus Brennan (FF)	Nuala Fennell (FG)	John Kelly (FG)	Alan Shatter (FG)
25th	1987	Tom Kitt (FF)	Séamus Brennan (FF)	Anne Colley (PDs)	John Kelly (FG)	Alan Shatter (FG)
26th	1989	Tom Kitt (FF)	Séamus Brennan (FF)	Nuala Fennell (FG)	Roger Garland (GP)	Alan Shatter (FG)
27th	1992	Tom Kitt (FF)	Séamus Brennan (FF)	Liz O'Donnell (PDs)	Eithne FitzGerald (Lab)	Alan Shatter (FG)
28th	1997	Tom Kitt (FF)	Séamus Brennan (FF)	Liz O'Donnell (PDs)	Olivia Mitchell (FG)	Alan Shatter (FG)
29th	2002	Tom Kitt (FF)	Séamus Brennan (FF)	Liz O'Donnell (PDs)	Olivia Mitchell (FG)	Eamon Ryan (GP)
30th	2007	Tom Kitt (FF)	Séamus Brennan (FF)	Alan Shatter (FG)	Olivia Mitchell (FG)	Eamon Ryan (GP)
30th	2009 by-election	Tom Kitt (FF)	George Lee (FG)	Alan Shatter (FG)	Olivia Mitchell (FG)	Eamon Ryan (GP)
31st	2011	Shane Ross (Ind.)	Peter Mathews (FG)	Alan Shatter (FG)	Olivia Mitchell (FG)	Alex White (Lab)
32nd	2016	Constituency abolished. See Dublin Rathdown, Dublin South-West and Dún Laoghaire.				
