= Kevin Dixon (attorney general) =

Irish barrister and judge

Judge of the High Court
- In office 1 May 1946 – 7 June 1959
- Nominated by: Government of Ireland
- Appointed by: Seán T. O'Kelly

Attorney General of Ireland
- In office 10 October 1942 – 30 April 1946
- Taoiseach: Éamon de Valera
- Preceded by: Kevin Haugh
- Succeeded by: Cearbhall Ó Dálaigh

Personal details
- Born: 22 October 1902 Dublin, Ireland
- Died: 7 June 1959 (aged 56) Dublin, Ireland
- Party: Fianna Fáil
- Spouse(s): Mary McEoin (m. 1934; d. 1959)
- Children: 3
- Education: University College Dublin

Kevin Dixon (22 October 1902 – 7 June 1959) was an Irish barrister and judge who served as a Judge of the High Court from 1946 to 1959 and Attorney General of Ireland from 1942 to 1946.

He was born in Dublin and educated at Belvedere College and University College Dublin. He was called to the bar in 1926 and became a Senior Counsel in 1940. He served as Attorney General of Ireland from 1942 to 1946 when he was appointed a judge of the High Court where he served until his death in 1959.

He was generally considered the best Irish Chancery judge of his time with a particular knowledge of trade union law and the law of charities. Despite the inevitably dry subject matter of many of his judgements, some of them display a considerable sense of humour. He was the High Court judge in the celebrated Constitutional test case O'Byrne v Minister for Finance on the interpretation of the guarantee that a judge's salary shall not be reduced, a subject which remains controversial today. Dixon's ruling that notwithstanding the guarantee judges are liable to pay income tax was upheld by a majority of the Supreme Court. It was generally agreed that only his premature death prevented his promotion to the Supreme Court of Ireland.

Legal offices
Preceded by Kevin Haugh	Attorney General of Ireland; 1942–1946	Succeeded by Cearbhall Ó Dálaigh
