= Patrick Connolly =

Irish Attorney General

Attorney General of Ireland
- In office 9 March 1982 – 17 August 1982
- Taoiseach: Charles Haughey
- Preceded by: Peter Sutherland
- Succeeded by: John L. Murray

Personal details
- Born: Patrick James Connolly; 25 May 1927 Oldtown, County Dublin, Ireland
- Died: 7 January 2016 (aged 88) Dalkey, Dublin, Ireland
- Party: Fianna Fáil
- Education: University College Dublin; King's Inns

Patrick James Connolly (25 May 1927 – 7 January 2016) was an Irish barrister who served as Attorney General of Ireland from March 1982 to August 1982.

== Early life and career ==
Connolly was born on 25 May 1927, the elder of the two sons of a headmaster and a teacher in Fingal, in Dublin. He was educated at St Joseph's College, University College Dublin and the King's Inns, after which he was called to the Bar in 1949. His practice, which focused on personal injury cases, was widely successful. On 9 March 1982, Taoiseach Charles Haughey named him as Attorney General of Ireland.

== MacArthur scandal ==
Connolly resigned on 17 August 1982 after Malcolm MacArthur, who had been a house-guest of Connolly's, was arrested for murder. MacArthur, the domestic partner of Connolly's friend Brenda Little, had committed a horrific double murder in the midst of a botched carjacking and robbery in 1982. Though Connolly was not implicated in the murder or in knowingly harbouring the assassin, he was forced to resign at midnight the night of MacArthur's arrest and never again served in government.

== Later life and death ==
Connolly returned to practice at the Irish bar and to work as a senior counsel in Dublin. Connolly died aged 88 on 7 January 2016. Though he never married, he had a very close relationship with his extended family, including his nephew and two nieces who spoke at his funeral Mass. He was buried in Deansgrange Cemetery.

Legal offices
Preceded by Peter Sutherland	Attorney General of Ireland; 1982	Succeeded by John L. Murray
