= John Rogers (Irish lawyer) =

22nd Attorney General of Ireland (1984 – 1987)

John Rogers SC

Attorney General of Ireland
- In office 13 December 1984 – 10 March 1987
- Taoiseach: Garret FitzGerald
- Preceded by: Peter Sutherland
- Succeeded by: John L. Murray

Personal details
- Born: 11 September 1947 (age 78) Dublin, Ireland
- Party: Labour Party
- Education: Trinity College Dublin

John Rogers SC (born 11 September 1947) is an Irish barrister who served as Attorney General of Ireland from 1984 to 1987.

He was educated at Rockwell College and Trinity College Dublin.

The Labour Party demanded the right to choose the Attorney General in the coalition government of 1984. At the time Mary Robinson was expected to be chosen; instead the nomination went to John Rogers, who had not yet been appointed a senior counsel (SC). Traditionally a new Attorney General would have practised as a senior counsel for a number of years prior to their appointment. Rogers was appointed an SC on the day he was made Attorney General of Ireland. He has worked as a senior counsel in the Law Library, Dublin, from 1987 to date. Rogers was banned from driving, for 2 years, in 1998 after being arrested for drink driving. He was more than twice over the legal limit.

Legal offices
Preceded by Peter Sutherland	Attorney General of Ireland; 1984–1987	Succeeded by John L. Murray
