= Peter Sutherland =

Irish businessman and politician (1946–2018)

Peter Sutherland GCIH KCMG KCSG MRIA SC
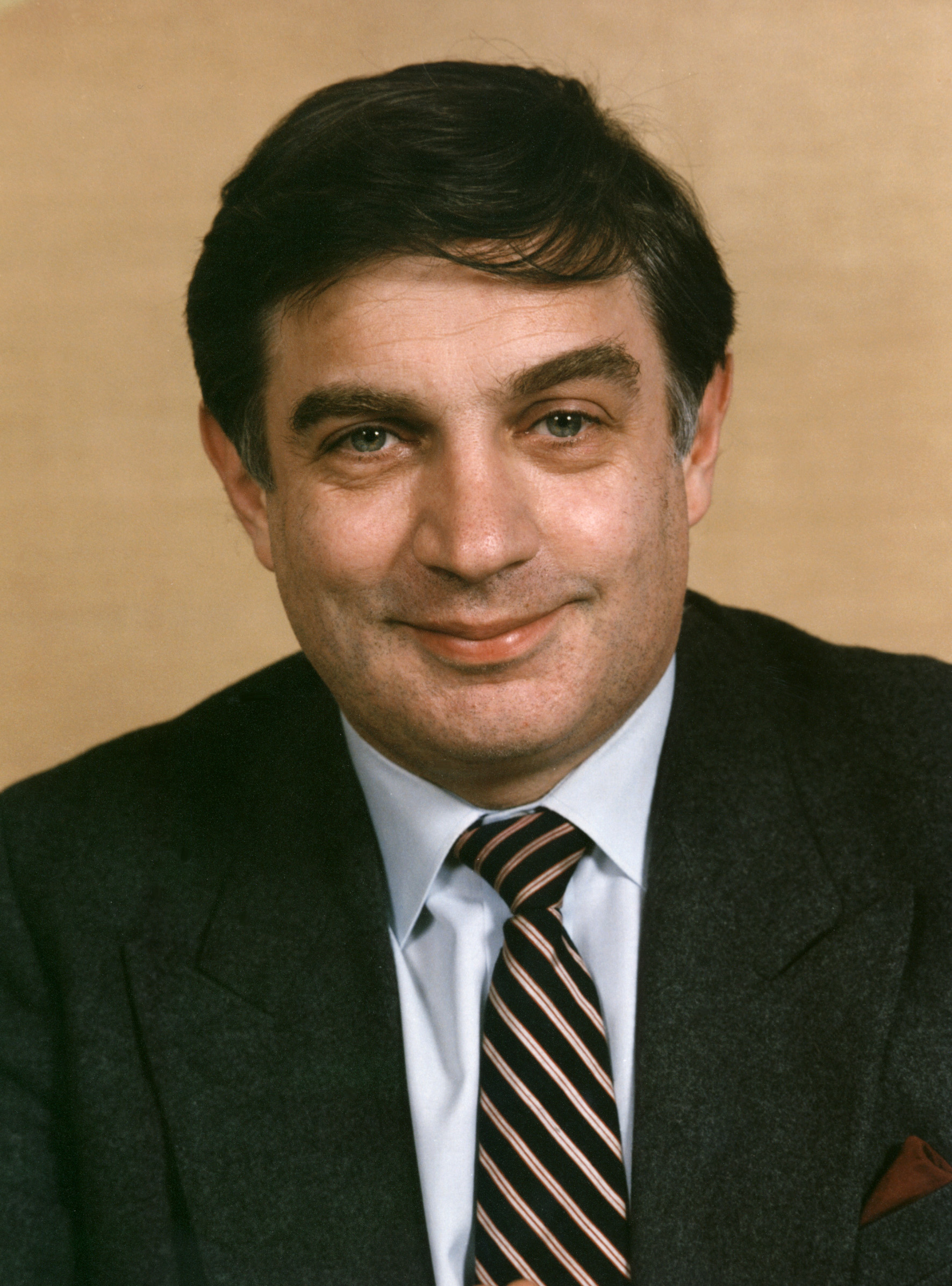
- Official portrait, 1985

UN Special Representative for International Migration
- In office 12 January 2006 – 9 March 2017
- Secretary-General: Kofi Annan; Ban Ki-moon; António Guterres
- Succeeded by: Louise Arbour

Chairman of Goldman Sachs
- In office 1 July 1995 – 1 May 2015
- Preceded by: Edith W. Cooper
- Succeeded by: Lloyd Blankfein

1st Director-General of the World Trade Organization
- In office 1 July 1993 – 1 May 1995
- Preceded by: Arthur Dunkel (GATT)
- Succeeded by: Renato Ruggiero

European Commissioner for Competition
- In office 7 January 1985 – 5 January 1989
- President: Jacques Delors
- Preceded by: Frans Andriessen
- Succeeded by: Leon Brittan

Attorney General of Ireland
- In office 30 June 1981 – 9 March 1982
- Taoiseach: Garret FitzGerald
- Preceded by: Anthony J. Hederman
- Succeeded by: Patrick Connolly
- In office 15 December 1982 – 12 December 1984
- Taoiseach: Garret FitzGerald
- Preceded by: John L. Murray
- Succeeded by: John Rogers

Personal details
- Born: Peter Denis Sutherland; 25 April 1946 Foxrock, Dublin, Ireland
- Died: 7 January 2018 (aged 71) Dublin, Ireland
- Resting place: Kilternan Cemetery Park, Dublin
- Party: Fine Gael
- Spouse: Maruja (m. 1971)
- Children: 3
- Education: University College Dublin

Peter Denis Sutherland (25 April 1946 – 7 January 2018) was an Irish businessman, barrister and Fine Gael politician who served as UN Special Representative for International Migration from 2006 to 2017. He was known for serving in various international organisations, political and business roles.

Sutherland was the UN Special Representative of the Secretary-General for International Migration until March 2017. Appointed in January 2006, he was responsible for the creation of the Global Forum on Migration and Development (GFMD). He also served as President of the International Catholic Migration Commission, as well as a member of the Migration Advisory Board of the International Organization for Migration. He was a board member of Wallenberg-owned ABB and the Wallenbergs' conglomerate holding company, Investor AB.

A barrister by profession, Sutherland was a Senior Counsel of the Bar Council of Ireland. He previously served as Attorney General of Ireland (1981–1982, 1982–1984); European Commissioner for Competition (1985–1989); founding Director-General of the World Trade Organization, formerly GATT (1993–1995); and chairman of Goldman Sachs International (1995–2015). He received numerous awards, including the European Person of the Year Award (1988).

== Early and personal life ==
Sutherland was born in Dublin in 1946 to William George Sutherland and Barbara Sutherland (née Nealon). He was educated at Gonzaga College in Ranelagh, Dublin. He graduated in Civil Law at University College Dublin and practised at the Irish Bar between 1969 and 1980. He married Maruja, a Spaniard, in 1974.

== Political career ==
He was a Fine Gael candidate at the 1973 general election for the Dublin North-West constituency. He received 1,969 (6.2%) of the first-preference votes but was not elected.

=== Attorney General of Ireland ===
Sutherland was appointed Attorney General of Ireland in June 1981, serving until March 1982. He retook the post from December 1982 to December 1984, during which he drafted the 1983 amendment bill that inserted the constitutional ban on abortion into Article 40.3.3°.

=== European Commissioner ===
Sutherland was appointed to the European Commission (EC) in 1985 and had responsibility for competition policy and, initially for 1985 only, also for education. He said that he was especially pleased to have proposed the establishment of the Erasmus Programme that allows European university students to study in other member states.

He was chairman of the Committee that produced the Sutherland Report on the completion of the Internal Market of the European Economic Community (EEC), commissioned by the EC and presented to the European Council at its Edinburgh meeting in 1992.

Sutherland was the youngest ever European Commissioner. He served in the first Delors Commission, where he played a crucial role in opening up European competition, particularly in the airline, telecoms, and energy sectors. He also played a major role in reinforcing state aid control, notably through the high-profile Boussac case.

== GATT/WTO ==
In 1993, he became Director-General of the General Agreement on Tariffs and Trade (now the World Trade Organization). Later Mickey Kantor, the United States Trade Representative, credited him with being the father of globalisation and said that without him there would have been no WTO. The Uruguay round of global trade talks, concluded in December 1993 with Sutherland as chair of GATT, produced a "comprehensive, rules-based and global trade regime" which was the biggest trade agreement in history and established the WTO. His integral role in the successful conclusion of these negotiations has been cited as "indispensable". Chairing the Uruguay Round, Sutherland "employed tactics the likes of which had never been seen before in GATT…he worked to create the sense of unstoppable momentum" by mobilising the press and media and instigating "a more aggressive public relations than the staid GATT had ever before seen".

A 2013 book by Craig VanGrasstek of the Harvard Kennedy School, published by the WTO, The History and Future of the World Trade Organization, details Sutherland's role in the formation and establishment of the body.

On the elevation of the role of director-general, VanGrasstek writes, "The office is shaped to a great degree by the person who occupies it, and Director-General Peter Sutherland – who served both as the last GATT director-general and the first WTO director-general – redefined the role and the links between that office and the leadership in the members in a way that gave him and his successors additional options for the conduct of negotiations". Sutherland was instrumental in elevating the office of director-general to one that dealt directly with presidents and prime ministers, not just ministers, a key factor in the success of negotiations and the political esteem of the body going forward. He served as Chairman of the Advisory Council to the Director-General, which produced the report on the future of the WTO, published in 2005.

== Business career ==
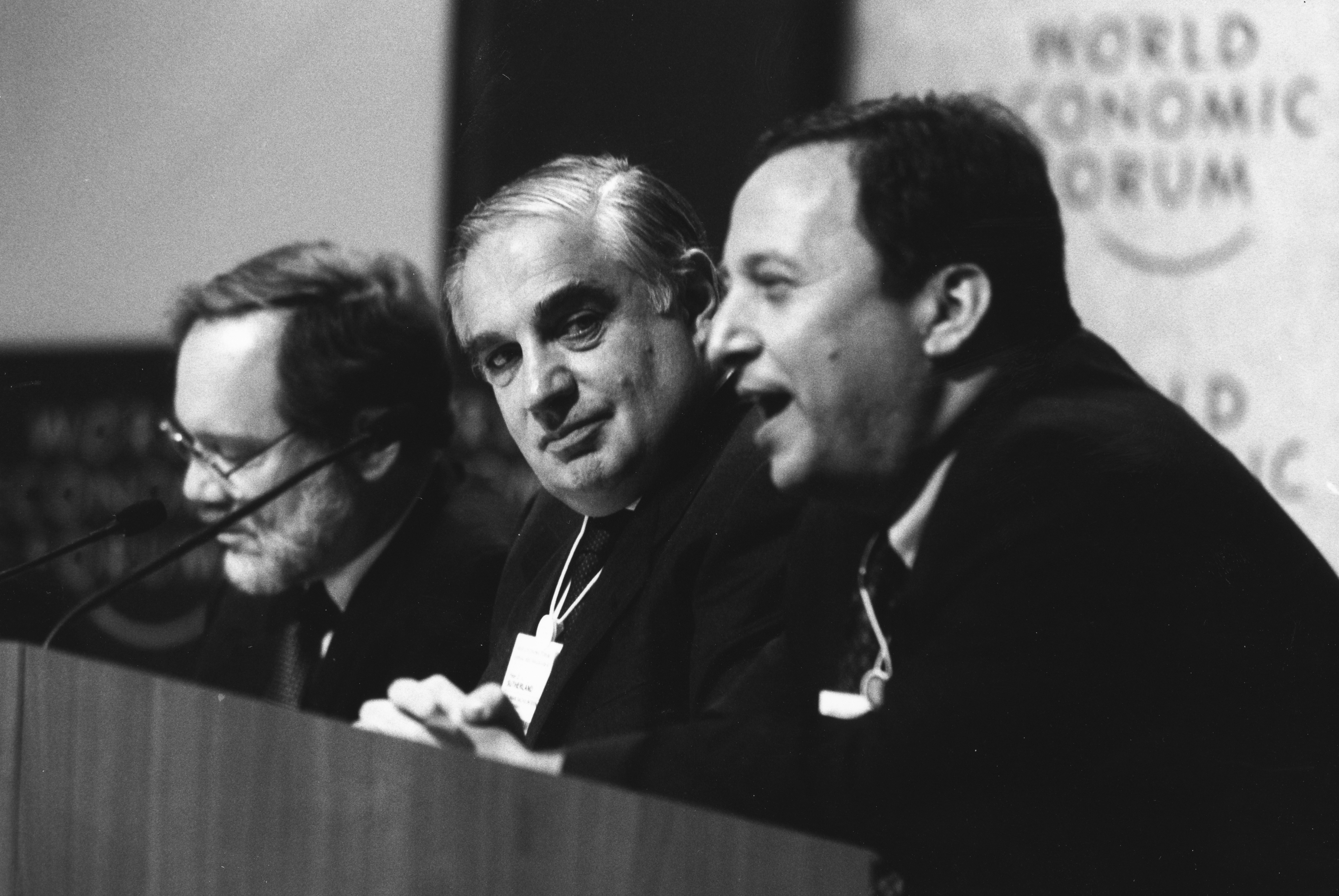
Sutherland (centre) with IIE director C. Fred Bergsten and US deputy Treasury secretary Lawrence Summers at the World Economic Forum Annual Meeting in Davos, 1997

Sutherland was the chairman of Allied Irish Banks (AIB) from 1989 until 1993.

He was non-executive chairman of Goldman Sachs International (a registered UK broker-dealer, a subsidiary of Goldman Sachs) until June 2015.

Until June 2009, he was non-executive chairman of BP, being replaced by Carl-Henric Svanberg, formerly chief executive officer of Ericsson. Sutherland was a director of the Royal Bank of Scotland Group until the UK government took it over to avoid bankruptcy. He also formerly served on the board of ABB. He was also a non-executive director of construction materials giant CRH plc from 1989 to July 1993. CRH plc was fined in 1994 by the European Competition Directorate General for its role in the pan-European cement cartel (Case Number IV 33.126 AND 33.322).

He served on the steering committee of the Bilderberg Group until May 2014, and was Honorary Chairman of the Trilateral Commission (from 2010), formerly Chairman of the Trilateral Commission (Europe) (2001–2010); and vice chairman of the European Round Table of Industrialists (2006–2009).

He was chairman of the Board of Governors of the European Institute of Public Administration (Maastricht) from 1991 to 1996. He was also Honorary President of the European Movement Ireland.

He was a member of the Hong Kong Chief Executive's Council of International Advisers between 1998 and 2005.

He produced the Sutherland Report for the Portuguese government on the handover of Macao to China in January 2000.

He was President of the Federal Trust for Education and Research, a British think tank; chairman of The Ireland Fund of Great Britain from 2001 to 2009, part of The Ireland Funds; and a member of the advisory council of Business for New Europe, a British pro-European think-tank.

In 2002, Sutherland was elected a member of the Royal Irish Academy (MRIA).

He was a member of the Commission on Human Security set up by the Japanese government that reported to the United Nations in 2003.

In 2005, he was appointed as Goodwill Ambassador for the United Nations Industrial Development Organization. In Spring 2006 he was appointed Chair of the London School of Economics (LSE) Council commencing in 2008, a position he held until February 2015.

Sutherland also served on the International Advisory Board of IESE Business School, the graduate business school of Spain's University of Navarra.

In January 2006, he was appointed by UN secretary-general Kofi Annan as his Special Representative for Migration. In this position, he was responsible for promoting the establishment of a Global Forum on Migration and Development, a state-led effort open to all UN members to help governments better understand how migration can benefit their development goals. UN member states acclaimed the Global Forum at the UN High-Level Dialogue on International Migration and Development in September 2006, and would be launched in Brussels in July 2007.

On 5 December 2006, he was appointed as Consultor of the Extraordinary Section of the Administration of the Patrimony of the Apostolic See (a financial adviser to the Vatican). He received a Papal knighthood for his service, in 2008 (KCSG).

Sutherland was also co-chairman of the High Level Group appointed by the governments of Germany, the United Kingdom, Indonesia and Turkey to report on the conclusion of the Doha Round and the future of multilateral trade negotiations. Its report was issued in May 2011.

In May 2012, Sutherland was named Honorary President of the European Policy Centre, a Brussels-based independent think tank.

== Later years ==
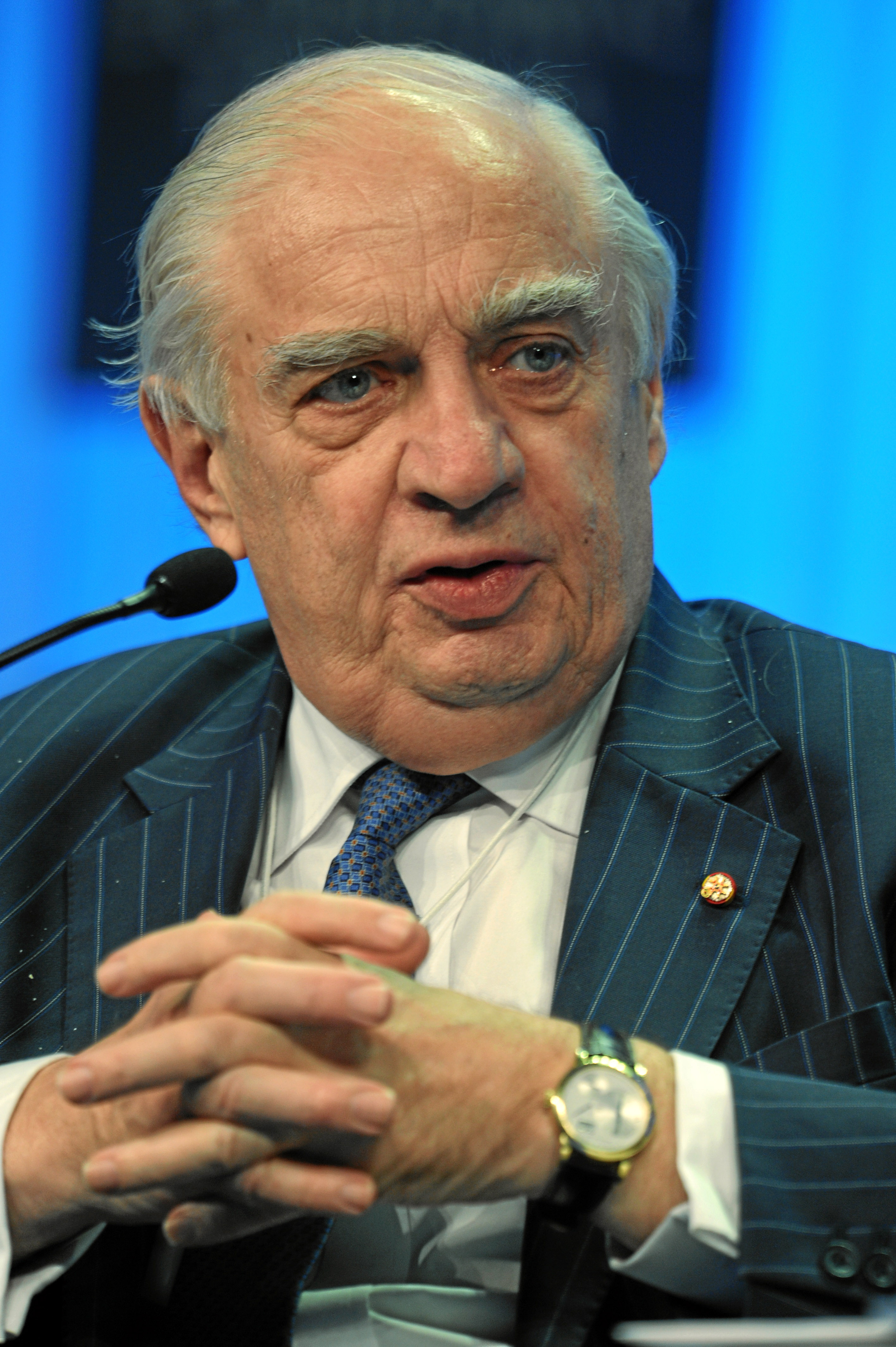
Sutherland in 2011

In an interview with The Irish Times in early 2010, Sutherland revealed that in summer 2009, during a holiday, one of his children noticed a swelling on his throat while they sat on a beach. He was back home in London within a week, undergoing a major operation. Sutherland had an operation for throat cancer in August 2009, and following the procedure, he underwent chemotherapy and radiotherapy.

For Sutherland, a Europhile, the worst part about his illness was missing the "mortal combat" of fighting for the Yes vote in the second Lisbon referendum.

Sutherland visited Fianna Fáil politician Brian Lenihan to tell him what a great job he thought he was doing and to say that Lenihan had the potential to be one of the great taoisigh of the 21st century. Lenihan was taken aback, he said. Sutherland believed Ireland failed in economic terms over most of the past four decades except for a "sparkling period" from 1994 to 2002 when the state took advantage of European Union (EU) changes freeing up the movement of goods, capital and services across Europe.

In November 2010, he renewed his involvement in trade issues when he was appointed co-chair of an Experts Group created by the heads of government of Germany, the United Kingdom, Indonesia and Turkey to report on the priority actions to combat protectionism and to boost global trade. The Trade Experts Group's interim report was launched at Davos on 28 January 2011.

Kofi Annan twice offered him the job of United Nations High Commissioner for Refugees, a fact, he said, that he had never disclosed publicly before, but he declined both times due to other commitments. He cited his work at GATT and the introduction of the Erasmus student exchange programme when he briefly held the education portfolio at the Commission in 1986 as his two most rewarding achievements.

== Death ==
In September 2016, Sutherland suffered a heart attack while attending mass at a Catholic church in London. Six months later, he resigned from his post as UN Special Representative of the Secretary-General for International Migration because of poor health. After a long illness, Sutherland died in Dublin on 7 January 2018, of complications from an infection, aged 71.

== Immigration policy ==
Sutherland strongly advocated unrestricted immigration into the EU. Sutherland gave his opinion to the UK's House of Lords Home Affairs Committee on 21 June 2012 as being

(a) that "at the most basic level individuals should have freedom of choice" about working and studying in other countries and that EU states should stop targeting "highly skilled" migrants (and, conversely, placing restrictions on low-skilled migrants). Sutherland also argued (b) that migration is a "crucial dynamic for economic growth" and that this is the case "however difficult it may be to explain this to the citizens of those states". Sutherland's stated opinions on policy were (a) that "it was fundamentally important for states to cooperate on migration policy rather than developing their own policies in isolation as 'no state is or can be an island'"

(b) that multiculturalism is both inevitable and desirable: "It's impossible to consider that the degree of homogeneity which is implied by the other argument can survive because states have to become more open states, in terms of the people who inhabit them" and also

(c) that "the European Union, in my view, should be doing its best to undermine" any "sense of our homogeneity and difference from others". An ageing or declining native population in countries like Germany or southern EU states was the "key argument and, I hesitate to the use word because people have attacked it, for the development of multicultural states", he added.

Sutherland restated his view in the syndicated article co-authored with Cecilia Malmström titled "Europe's Immigration Challenge", the opening paragraph of which declares:

Europe faces an immigration predicament. Mainstream politicians, held hostage by xenophobic parties, adopt anti-immigrant rhetoric to win over a fearful public, while the foreign-born are increasingly marginalized in schools, cities and at the workplace. Yet, despite high unemployment across much of the Continent, too many employers lack the workers they need. Engineers, doctors and nurses are in short supply; so, too, are farmhands and health aides. And Europe can never have enough entrepreneurs, whose ideas drive economies and create jobs.

In June 2014, Sutherland was appointed President of the International Catholic Migration Commission (ICMC).

== Honours, awards and honorary doctorates ==
Sutherland received fifteen honorary doctorates from universities in Europe and America.

=== Orders ===
His awards include:

- Grand Cross of Order of Civil Merit (Spain, 1989)
- Knight of the Legion of Honour (France, 1993)
- Grand Cross of Order of Leopold II (Belgium, 1989)
- Commandeur of the Order of Ouissam Alaouite (Morocco, 1994)
- Order of Rio Branco (Brazil, 1996)
- Grand Cross of the Order of Infante Dom Henrique (Portugal, 1998)
- Honorary Knighthood of the Order of St Michael and St George (UK, 2004)
- Knight Commander of the Order of St Gregory (con placca) (Holy See, 2008)
- Knight Commander's cross, Order of the Polar Star (Sweden, 2014)

=== Other ===
- Honorary Fellow of OXONIA, The Oxford Institute for Economic Policy
- Honorary Doctorate of Law, St Louis University (1985)
- The Gold Medal of the European Parliament (1988)
- Robert Schuman Medal, EPP Group (1988)
- The First European Law Prize (Paris, 1988)
- European Person of the Year Award (1988)
- The David Rockefeller International Leadership Award (1998)
- The Irish People of the Year Award (1989)
- New Zealand 1990 Commemoration Medal (1990)
- Honorary Doctorate of Law, National University of Ireland (1990)
- The Consumer for World Trade Annual Award (1994)
- Honorary Doctorate of Law, University of Bath (1995)
- The Dean's Medal, Wharton School of the University of Pennsylvania (1996)
- Honorary Doctorate of Law, University of Reading (1997)
- Honorary Doctorate of Law, University of Nottingham (1999)
- Honorary Doctorate of Law, University of Exeter (2000)
- Golden Plate Award of the American Academy of Achievement (2002), presented by the Taoiseach, Bertie Ahern, at the International Achievement Summit in Dublin
- Foundation Day Medal, University College Dublin (2004)
- Honorary Doctorate of Law, Queen's University Belfast (2004)
- Honorary Doctorate of Letters, University of Sussex (2008)
- Lifetime Achievement Award, Ireland Chamber of Commerce USA (2009)
- Honorary Fellowship of the London School of Business
- Honorary Vice President of the University College Dublin Law Society (2011)
- Honorary Fellow of St Benet's Hall, Oxford (2013)
- University College Dublin law school was renamed the Sutherland School of Law in his honour, following his financial contribution to the newly-completed law teaching facility (2013)
- UCD Economics Society Tom Kettle Award (2016)

Legal offices
Preceded by Anthony J. Hederman	Attorney General of Ireland; 1981–1982	Succeeded by Patrick Connolly
Preceded by John L. Murray	Attorney General of Ireland; 1982–1984	Succeeded by John Rogers
Political offices
Preceded by Richard Burke	Irish European Commissioner; 1985–1989	Succeeded by Ray MacSharry
Preceded by Frans Andriessen	European Commissioner for Competition; 1985–1989	Succeeded by Leon Brittan
Non-profit organization positions
Preceded by Arthur Dunkel as Director-General of the GATT	Director-General of the World Trade Organization; 1993–1995	Succeeded by Renato Ruggiero
Civic offices
Preceded by Otto Graf Lambsdorff	European Group Chairman of the Trilateral Commission; 2001–2010	Succeeded by Mario Monti
