= List of University College Dublin people =

The following is a list of University College Dublin people, including notable alumni and faculty members of University College Dublin, a constituent university of the National University of Ireland.

== Alumni ==
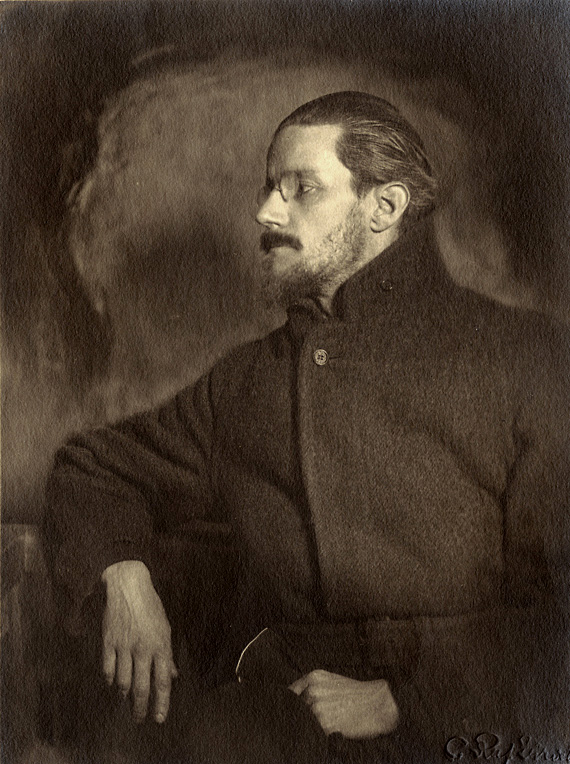
Influential writer James Joyce, c. 1918

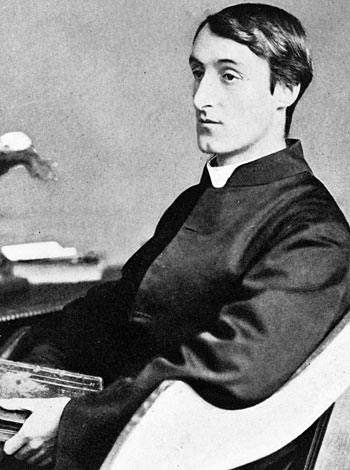
Victorian poet Gerard Manley Hopkins

=== Literature ===
- Maeve Binchy, author
- Sarah Rees Brennan
- Gabriel Byrne
- Marina Carr
- Austin Clarke
- Benjamin Cleary
- Brian Cleeve
- Brian Coffey
- Eamon Delaney
- Denis Devlin
- Emma Donoghue
- Roddy Doyle (Paddy Clarke Ha Ha Ha)
- Paul Durcan
- Brendan Gleeson
- Michael Hartnett
- Desmond Hogan
- Gerard Manley Hopkins
- John Jordan
- Neil Jordan, Oscar winner, (The Crying Game)
- James Joyce, author of Ulysses
- Trevor Joyce
- Thomas Kilroy
- Mary Lavin
- Princess Mako of Akishino
- Hugh McFadden
- John McGahern
- Frank McGuinness
- Marie McMillan
- Conor McPherson
- John Montague
- Flann O'Brien (At Swim-Two-Birds)
- Kate O'Brien
- Carroll O'Connor
- Joseph O'Connor
- Ulick O'Connor
- Chris O'Dowd
- Dan O'Herlihy
- Seán Ó Faoláin
- Liam O'Flaherty
- Nuala O Faolain
- Brian O'Nolan, writer, At Swim-Two-Birds
- Emily O'Reilly
- Keith Ridgway
- Jim Sheridan (My Left Foot)
- Orla Tinsley
- Colm Tóibín (The Master)

=== Journalism ===
- Vincent Browne
- Ruth Dudley Edwards
- Sally Hayden journalist
- Hugh McFadden
- Kevin Myers
- Doireann Ní Bhriain
- Kevin O'Sullivan, editor of The Irish Times
- Fintan O'Toole
- Caitriona Palmer
- Conor Ryan
- Maev-Ann Wren

=== Business ===
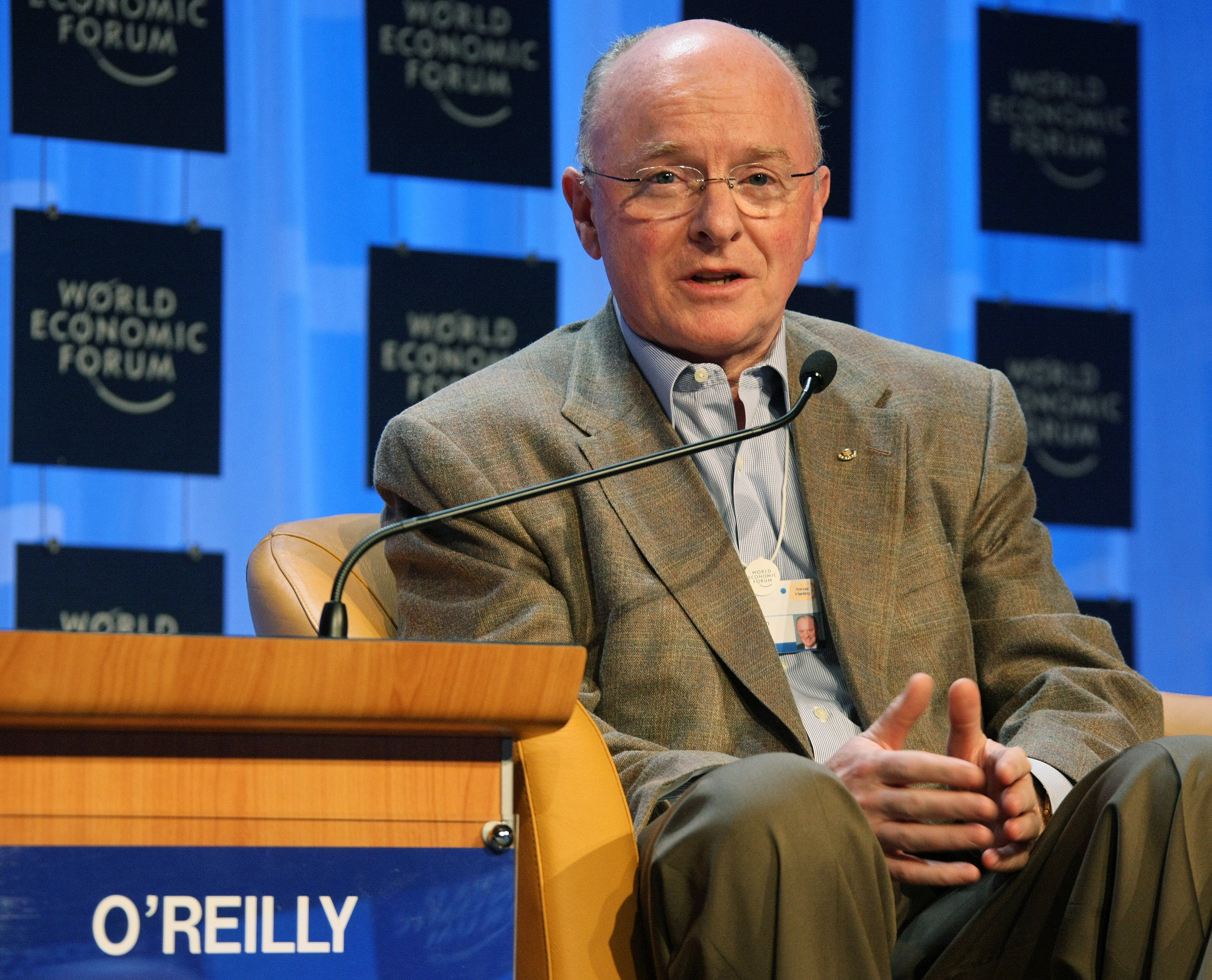
David J. O'Reilly, former chairman and CEO of Chevron

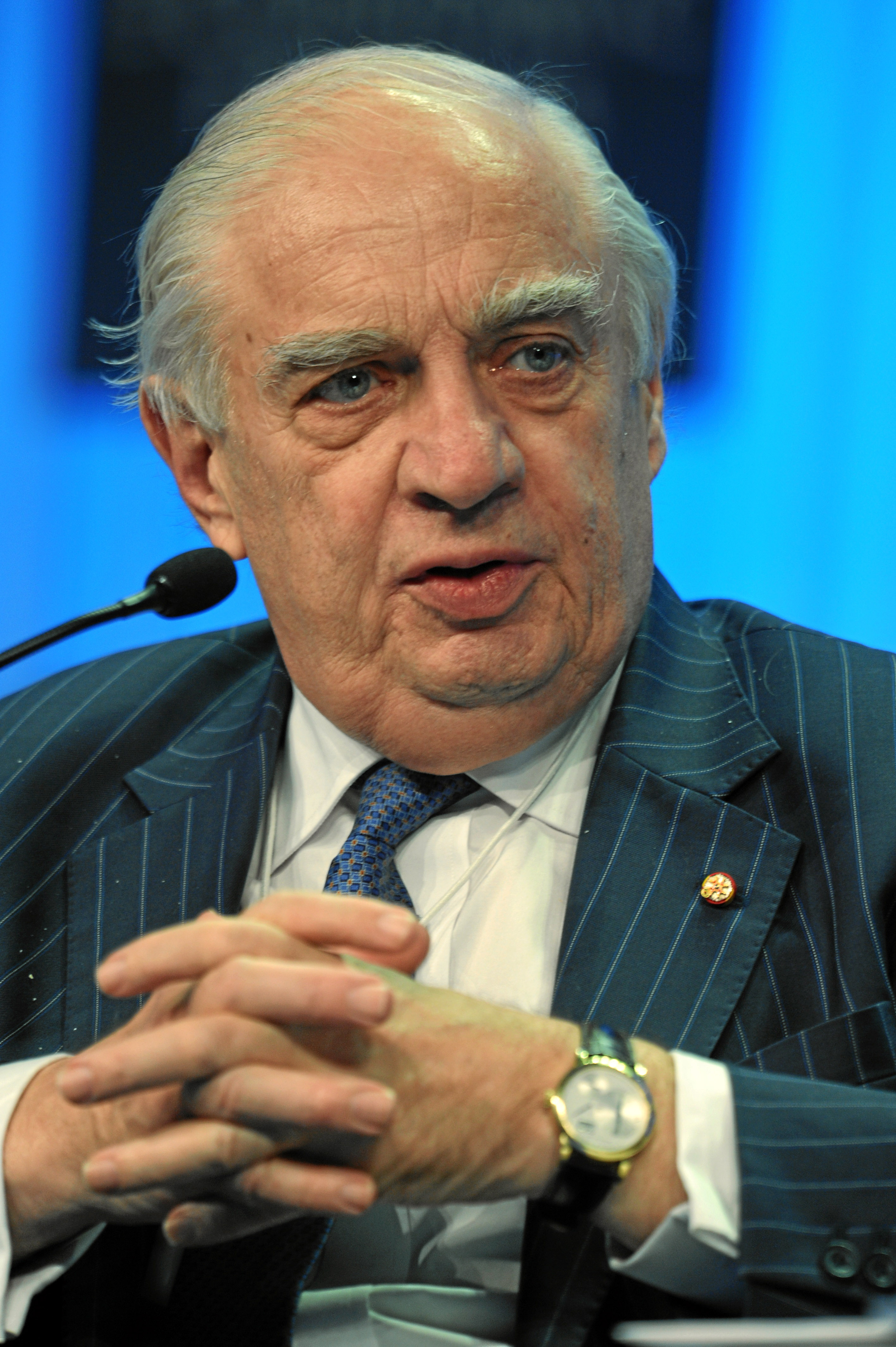
Peter Sutherland

- Sharon Donnery, Irish economist and financial regulator
- Niall FitzGerald, former CEO of Unilever
- Aidan Heavey, CEO of Tullow Oil
- Gary McGann chairman of Flutter Entertainment, and former CEO of Smurfit Kappa and Aer Lingus
- Ann O'Dea, CEO of Inspirefest
- Tony O'Reilly, owner of Mediahuis Ireland
- Denis O'Brien, owner of Communicorp and Digicel
- David J. O'Reilly, chairman and CEO of Chevron Corporation
- Dalton Philips, CEO of Morrisons
- Mark Pollock
- Feargal Quinn, former owner of Superquinn, and Senator
- Peter Sutherland, former Director General of the World Trade Organization; former Chairman of BP; Chairman of Goldman Sachs Europe; served as Ireland's Attorney General and European Commissioner

=== Science and technology ===
- Conrad Burke, entrepreneur
- Rónadh Cox, Irish geologist, Brust Professor of Geology and Mineralogy at Williams College and Fellow of the Geological Society of America
- Evelyn Cusack former Secretary of the Irish Meteorological Society.
- Conor P. Delaney, Irish-American colorectal surgeon known for developing enhanced recovery pathways
- Dervilla M. X. Donnelly, Irish chemist
- Orla Feely, Vice President for Research, Innovation and Impact and Professor of Electronic Engineering at University College Dublin, and Fellow of the Institute of Electrical and Electronics Engineers
- Garret A. FitzGerald Irish pharmacologist
- Edmond Harty CEO and technical director of Dairymaster,
- Tony Holohan, Chief Medical Officer of Ireland
- Mary Horgan, Irish physician and president of the Royal College of Physicians of Ireland
- Teresa Lambe, co-developer of Oxford–AstraZeneca COVID-19 vaccine
- Eleanor Maguire Irish neuropsychologist
- Julie McEnery American astrophysicist
- Eilis McGovern, Irish professor of cardiothoracic surgery, President of RCSI, and first female President of any Royal College of Surgeons in the world
- Anne Merriman British doctor, founded Hospice Africa Uganda
- John Monahan, bioscientist and CEO of Avigen Inc in California, a NASDAQ company
- Thomas E. Nevin, Irish physicist and Dean of the Faculty of Science 1963 to 1979
- John James Nolan, Irish physicist and President of the Royal Irish Academy
- Patrick Joseph Nolan, Irish atmospheric physicist
- Daniel Joseph Kelly O'Connell, SJ, astronomer and seismologist, Director of Riverview and the Vatican Observatory, president of the Pontifical Academy of Sciences(1968–72), O'Connell effect named after him.
- Cormac O'Raifeartaigh, Irish physicist and philosopher of science
- David J. O'Reilly former chairman and CEO of Chevron Corporation
- Delia Grace Randolph
- Michael J. Ryan (doctor) Irish epidemiologist and former trauma surgeon
- Trevor C. Weekes, astronomer, pioneer of gamma-ray astronomy

=== Mathematics ===
- Seán Dineen, mathematician known for results in complex analysis.
- Thomas J. Laffey, Mathematician known for group theory and matrix theory
- Peter Lynch, Mathematician, meteorologist, book author and Irish Times columnist
- Henry Charles McWeeney, Mathematician who served as vice president of UCD from 1909 to 1935
- Colm Mulcahy, Mathematician known for his chronicling of Irish mathematicians throughout history

=== Finance and banking ===
- Patrick Honohan, Governor of the Central Bank of Ireland

=== Politics and government ===
==== Heads of state ====
- V. V. Giri, 4th President of India
- Patrick Hillery, 6th President of Ireland
- Douglas Hyde, 1st President of Ireland, Professor of Irish
- Cearbhall Ó Dálaigh, 5th president of Ireland

==== Heads of government ====
- John Bruton, 9th Taoiseach of Ireland
- John A. Costello, 2nd Taoiseach of Ireland
- Brian Cowen, 11th Taoiseach of Ireland
- Garret FitzGerald, 7th Taoiseach of Ireland
- Charles Haughey, 6th Taoiseach of Ireland

==== Other Political Leaders ====
- Mairead McGuinness, European Commissioner

==== Military ====
- Michael Beary, Irish Army Major General and Commander of UNIFIL

==== Other ====
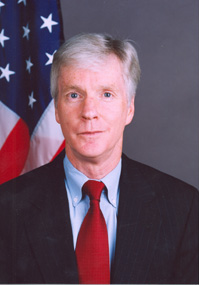
Ryan Crocker, US Ambassador to Iraq and recipient of the Presidential Medal of Freedom

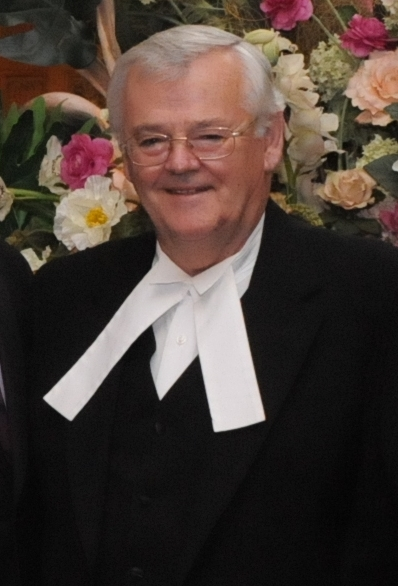
Noel Kinsella, 46th Speaker of the Canadian Senate

- Dermot Ahern
- Anne Anderson, Irish Ambassador to the United States
- David Andrews
- Kevin Barry
- Séamus Brennan
- Richard Bruton
- Joan Burton
- Eibhlin Byrne
- Mella Carroll
- Hazel Chu
- Ruth Coppinger former TD for Dublin West
- Patrick Costello
- Mary Coughlan
- Ryan Crocker, former United States Ambassador to Iraq; recipient of the Presidential Medal of Freedom
- Catherine Day, Secretary-General of the European Commission
- Ann Derwin, Ireland's Ambassador to China
- Síle de Valera
- Noel Dempsey
- Professor James Dooge, former Minister of Foreign Affairs; European Union architect; climatologist; Professor of Civil Engineering at UCD for several years
- Alan Dukes
- Martin Fraser
- Dermot Gallagher, Secretary-General of the Department of Foreign Affairs
- Aideen Hayden former Irish Labour Party politician
- Joe Higgins, former Socialist Party TD & MEP
- Justin Keating
- Vincent Keaveny Lawyer and 693rd Lord Mayor of London
- Hugh Kennedy
- Noël A. Kinsella, 46th Speaker of the Senate of Canada
- Michael Kitt
- Brian Lenihan
- Thomas MacDonagh
- Charlie McCreevy; former European Commissioner for Internal Market & Services
- Alasdair McDonnell former SDLP leader and MP for Belfast South
- Michael McDowell; former Tánaiste and Minister for Justice, Equality and Law Reform
- Mairead McGuinness Irish politician serving as the European Commissioner for Financial Stability, Financial Services and the Capital Markets Union
- Brendan Moran, former diplomat
- Paul Murphy TD for Dublin South West, former MEP
- John L. Murray
- Michael Noonan
- Éamon Ó Cuív
- Willie O'Dea
- Kevin O'Higgins
- Mary O'Rourke
- Nóirín O'Sullivan
- Nora Owen
- Patrick Pearse
- Ruairi Quinn
- Neale Richmond
- James Ryan
- Francis Skeffington
- Eóin Tennyson; Alliance Party MLA for Upper Bann
- Michael Woods
- Robert Watt (Irish civil servant)
- Seán Crum

=== Legal ===
- Caoilfhionn Gallagher barrister
- Paul Gallagher, former Attorney General
- Dermot Gleeson barrister
- Anthony J. Hederman
- Ronan Keane
- Hugh Kennedy, first Chief Justice of the State
- Cecil Lavery
- John L. Murray
- Michael Dillion, Head of Legal at CEA

=== Academia ===
- Thom Brooks, philosopher and legal academic
- Remi Chandran, researcher
- Anthony Clare, psychiatrist
- John Coakley, political scientist
- Arthur W. Conway, physicist
- Patrick Cosgrave, historian
- Deirdre Curtin, lawyer
- James Dooge, engineer
- Owen Dudley Edwards, historian
- Robert Dudley Edwards, historian
- Yvonne Farrell architect and academic
- Sorcha Ní Fhlainn, academic
- John D. FitzGerald, economist
- Noel Fitzpatrick, veterinarian
- Roy C. Geary, statistician
- Aoife Gowen, researcher
- Dennis Jennings (Internet pioneer)
- Tom Kettle, economist
- John Francis Leader, psychologist
- Eoin MacNeill, scholar
- J. A. McClelland, physicist
- Páid McGee, psychologist
- Shelley McNamara architect and academic
- Thomas Preston, physicist
- Frances P. Ruane, economist
- Martin J. Tobin Irish-American critical care physician, pulmonologist
- Desmond Williams, historian

=== Engineers ===
- Thomas McLaughlin, key player in the construction of the Ardnacrusha power plant, the largest hydroelectric plant in the world when constructed
- Eddie O'Connor, founder of Mainstream Renewable Energy
- William F. Roe, electrical engineer; led the rural electrification scheme in Ireland
- J.O.(Seán) Scanlan, circuit theory; gold medalist of the IEEE Circuits and Systems Society

=== Arts ===
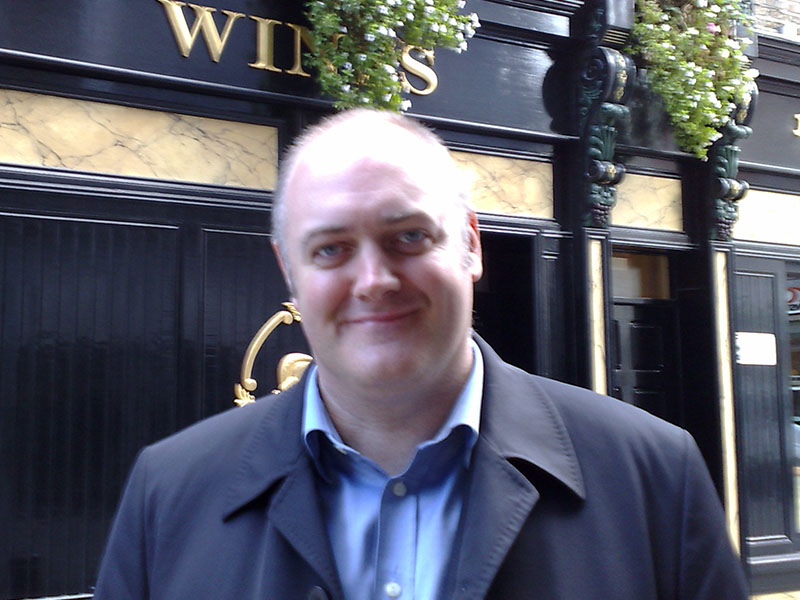
Dara Ó Briain, comedian

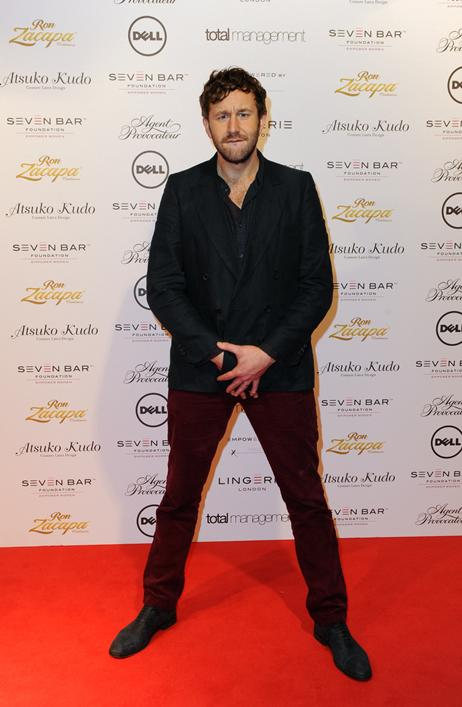
Chris O'Dowd, actor

- Joanne McNally, comedian
- Consolata Boyle, costume designer
- Paul Brady
- Niall Breslin, musician
- Gabriel Byrne
- Graham Cantwell
- Benjamin Cleary, Oscar winner
- Cyril Cusack
- Barbara Dawson, director of Hugh Lane Gallery, Dublin
- Foil Arms and Hog, Irish sketch comedy group.
- Brendan Gleeson
- Róisín Heneghan, architect and designer
- Amy Huberman
- Neil Jordan, film director, screenwriter, novelist and short story writer
- Roisin Kennedy, art critic and curator
- Pat Kenny, broadcaster, former host of The Late Late Show
- Rosaleen Linehan, actress
- Dominique McElligott, actress
- Hugh McFadden
- Michael McGlynn, Irish composer
- David McNulty, architect
- Kieron Moore
- Dermot Morgan, actor best known as Father Ted
- Dara Ó Briain, Mock the Week, Have I Got News For You, QI, Three Men in a Boat
- Miriam O'Callaghan, Irish television current affairs presenter with RTÉ
- Carroll O'Connor
- Chris O'Dowd, The IT Crowd, Bridesmaids, Girls, Moone Boy
- Dan O'Herlihy, Academy Award-nominated actor
- Kevin Roche, architect
- Jim Sheridan
- Bill Shipsey
- Ryan Tubridy, host of The Late Late Show
- Bill Whelan, composer and musician
- Colette Wong, presenter of Fox Sports Central Asia

=== Clergy ===
- Desmond Connell, Cardinal, Archbishop of Dublin
- Diarmuid Martin, Archbishop of Dublin
- Fr. Malachi Martin S.J., author
- Saint John Henry Newman, Cardinal, educator, writer
- Tomás Ó Fiaich, Cardinal, Archbishop of Armagh
- Maurice Piat CSSp, GCSK, Cardinal, Archbishop of Port Louis, Mauritius
- Dermot Ryan, Archbishop of Dublin, Professor of Oriental Languages

=== Sports ===
==== Soccer ====
- Alan Cawley, retired professional footballer
- Tony McDonnell, retired professional footballer
- David McMillan, striker for Dundalk FC
- Evan McMillan, defender for Sligo Rovers
- Kevin Moran, defender for Manchester United and Ireland
- Conor Sammon, Irish International, striker for Derby County

==== Hockey ====
- Emily Beatty, Irish International hockey player
- Deirdre Duke, Irish International hockey player
- Nicola Evans, Irish International hockey player
- Katie Mullen, Irish International hockey player
- Anna O'Flanagan, Irish International hockey player
- Gillian Pinder, Irish International hockey player

==== Rugby ====
- Patrick Casey, former Irish International
- Leo Cullen (rugby union), Coach of Leinster rugby team
- Gordon D'Arcy, Irish rugby international, British and Irish Lions
- Mick Doyle, Irish rugby international player and coach, British and Irish Lions
- Tony Ensor, former Irish rugby international
- Luke Fitzgerald, Ireland international and the British and Irish Lions
- Denis Hickie, former Irish rugby international, British and Irish Lions
- Rob Kearney, Ireland International and the British and Irish Lions
- Ray McLoughlin, Ireland international and British and Irish Lions
- Brian O'Driscoll, captain of the Irish rugby team, British and Irish Lions
- Conor O'Shea, Irish rugby international and director of rugby at Harlequin F.C.
- Johnny Sexton, Irish rugby union player
- Fergus Slattery, Ireland international and the British and Irish Lions
- Cillian Willis, currently playing for Connacht Rugby
- Nichola Fryday, Ireland Captain for the 2022 Women's Six Nations campaign

==== Rowing ====
- Eimear Lambe 2020 Summer Olympics bronze medalist
- Paul O'Donovan, Olympic gold medallist in lightweight double sculls

==== Horse Racing ====
- Dermot Weld former jockey and one of Ireland's most successful racehorse trainers.

==== GAA ====
- Rena Buckley Cork dual Gaelic football/camogie player
- Brian Dooher
- Cormac McAnallen
- Jack McCaffrey Gaelic footballer
- Kevin O'Flanagan
- Mícheál Ó Muircheartaigh Irish Gaelic games commentator
- Colm O'Rourke Gaelic football manager
- Derval O'Rourke
- Jason Sherlock

==== Swimming ====
- Michelle Smith

=== Fictional ===
- Brother Barnabas
- Stephen Dedalus
- Ross O'Carroll-Kelly

=== Humanitarians ===
- Fr. Aengus Finucane, missionary, one of the founders of Concern Worldwide
- Sr. Stanislaus Kennedy, founder of Focus Ireland
- Sr. Maura Lynch, Irish doctor, a nun, and proponent of women's health in Africa
- Ryan McKiernan, managing director of Fat Macy's Foundation
- Fr. Peter McVerry SJ, founder of the Peter McVerry Trust is a science graduate.
- Sr. Mary Aquinas Monaghan, Columban missionary in China and Hong Kong, a specialist in the treatment and management of tuberculosis.
- Sr. Lucy O'Brien, missionary nun and medical doctor in Africa.
- John O'Shea, humanitarian, founder of GOAL
- Sr. Mona Tyndall, medical doctor and missionary nun in Nigeria and Zambia

== Faculty ==
- Philip Pettit
- Aoife Ahern
- Hugh Brady
- Linda Cardinal
- Gerard Casey
- Terence Dolan
- Orla Feely
- Robert Gerwarth
- James J. Heckman
- Caroline Hussey
- Mark Keane
- Declan Kiberd
- Sinisa Malesevic
- Stephen Mennell
- Edna O'Brien
- Da-Wen Sun
- Joseph Watson
- Christopher T. Whelan
- Stephen A. Ambrose
- F. X. Martin
- J. J. Lee
- Ronan Fanning

== See also ==
- List of NUI Galway people
