= McWeeney =

McWeeney is a surname. Notable people with the surname include:

- James McWeeney (1866–1940), American football coach
- Henry Charles McWeeney (1867–1935), Irish mathematician and university vice president

== See also ==
- McWeeny
