= David McNulty (architect) =

Irish architect

David McNulty (born 14 February 1963) is an Irish architect.

Originally from Gorey, Co Wexford, McNulty studied architecture at University College Dublin (UCD), graduating in 1985. After graduation, he moved to Paris, France and began working at the office of Marcel Breuer Architects. He also worked with Christian de Portzamparc, Marc Held and then Chaix et Morel.

He joined Louis Vuitton in the late 1990s. After 20 years of managing the architecture department of Louis Vuitton, he joined the Chinese fashion company Icicle in 2017, becoming head of the commercial structure.

In 2014, he was awarded the UCD Alumni Award for Architecture.
