= Christopher T. Whelan =

Irish academic

Christopher T. Whelan was an Irish academic who was professor and head of sociology in UCD. He was formerly a research professor at the Economic and Social Research Institute (ESRI) in Dublin, Ireland, where he coordinated the research programmes of social inclusion and social cohesion and quality of life.

Whelan was a leading researcher on such issues as the causes and consequences of poverty and inequality, the measurement and monitoring of poverty, social inclusion, social mobility, quality of life, and inequality of opportunity. His research was published in leading journals, including the European Sociological Review. He is a sociologist, but his work straddles sociology and economics, and he was listed among Ireland's top economists.

Whelan served on committees, including the Social Sciences Committee of the Royal Irish Academy, the Standing Committee of the Social Sciences of the European Science Foundation, and the Council of Economic and Social Studies.

Whelan appeared in Irish news sources such as The Irish Times.

Christopher died in September 2022.
