= Caitriona Palmer =

Irish journalist and author (born 1972)

Caitriona Palmer (born 1972) is an Irish journalist, author, human rights investigator and advocate, born and raised in County Dublin, Ireland.

== Education ==
Palmer studied at University College Dublin, where she received a bachelor's degree in history and politics in 1993.

In 1995, she won a Fulbright Scholarship to complete her master's at Boston College.

In 2021, Palmer was awarded the UCD Alumni Award in Social Sciences.

== Career ==
From 2002 to 2004, Palmer was the Iran correspondent for The Irish Times based in Tehran.

Palmer is the author of two books, the memoir, An Affair With My Mother: A Story of Adoption, Secrecy and Love (Penguin, 2016) and Climate Justice (Bloomsbury, 2018), co-written with former president of Ireland, Mary Robinson.
