= Edmond Harty =

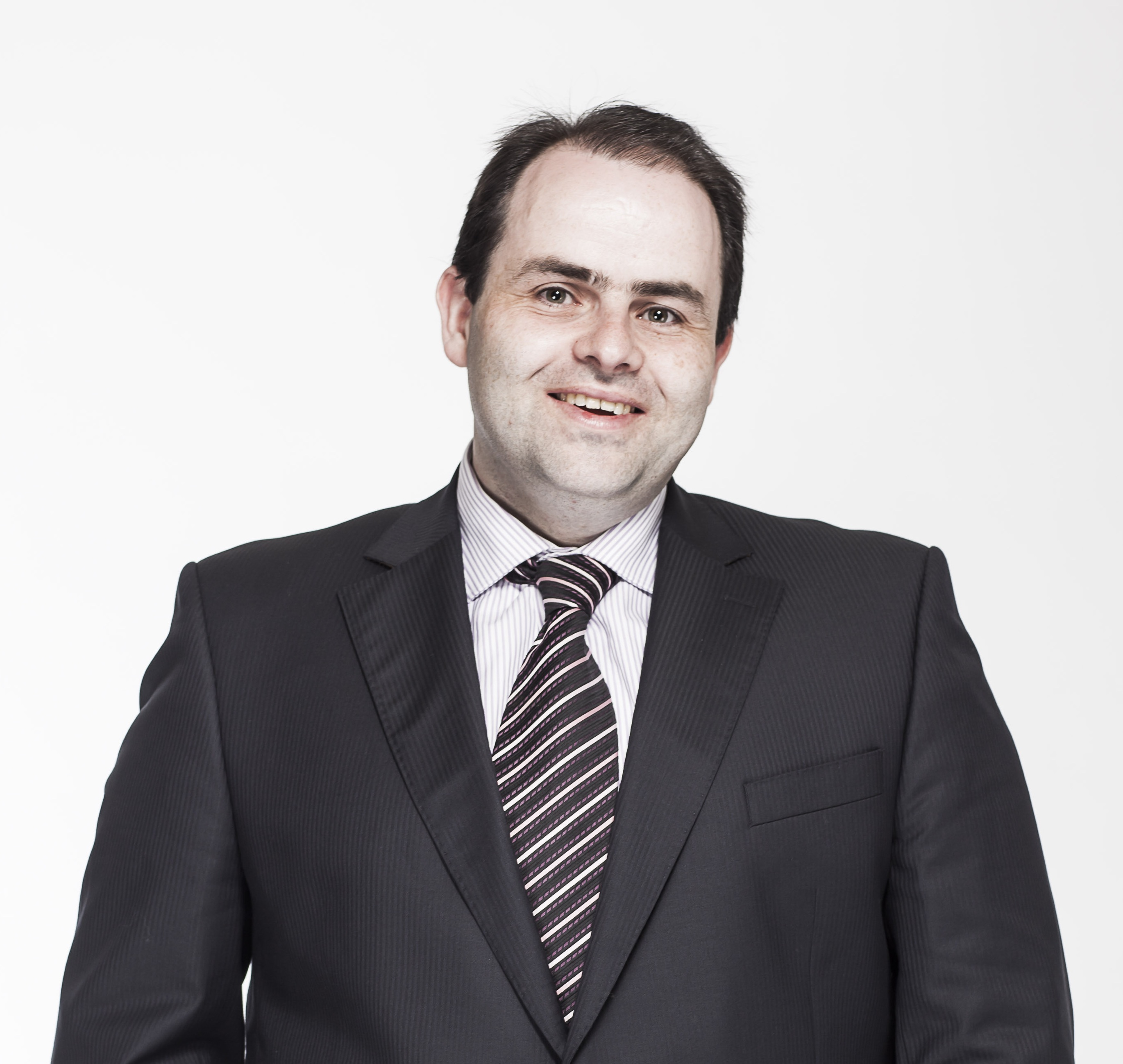
- Education: University of Limerick; University College Dublin
- Occupation: CEO
- Organization: Dairymaster

Edmond Harty is the CEO and technical director of Dairymaster, a milking equipment manufacturer. Its global headquarters are in Causeway, County Kerry, Ireland.

In 2012 Harty was presented with the title of International and overall Ernst and Young Entrepreneur of the Year by President of Ireland Michael D. Higgins.

Harty is a mechanical engineer by profession with a degree from University of Limerick. He joined Dairymaster in 1998, while studying for a PhD in University College Dublin where he focused on milking performance. He graduated in 2002 with a PhD in Agriculture and Food Science. In 2017, Harty was awarded UCD Alumnus of the Year in Engineering and Architecture.

He is a member of the International Organization for Standardization (ISO) and the International Dairy Federation (IDF), the foremost scientific groups in milking globally.

Harty has pioneered a number of new products and has over 40 patents filed to date as a result of work on product development with devices ranging from vacuum regulators and electronic milk metering to state of the art animal feeding systems.
