= Brendan Moran =

Irish former diplomat

Chief of Protocol at the Department of Foreign Affairs, Ireland
- In office 1991–1993
- President: Mary Robinson

Ambassador of Ireland to South Korea
- In office 1994–1999
- President: Mary Robinson; Mary McAleese
- Preceded by: Richard Ryan
- Succeeded by: Paul Murray

Director of Political Division at the Department of Foreign Affairs, Ireland
- In office 1999–2002
- President: Mary McAleese

Ambassador of Ireland to the OSCE
- In office 2002–2007
- President: Mary McAleese

Director of the Office of the High Commissioner on National Minorities
- In office 2007–2010

Personal details
- Born: 4 January 1946 (age 80) Dublin, Ireland
- Spouse: Aiglie Chryssafitou (m. 1974)
- Education: University College Dublin
- Awards: European Community Monitor Mission Medal

Brendan Francis Moran (born 4 January 1946) is an Irish former diplomat.

== Early life and education ==
Moran was born in Dublin to parents Margaret Mary Duffy and Sean Joseph Moran, a civil servant in the Department of Defence, Ireland. He attended University College Dublin from 1964 to 1969, gaining a Diploma in Public Administration in 1966 and a Bachelor of Commerce degree in 1969.

== Career ==
From 1969 to 1971, Moran was the 3rd secretary at the Department of Foreign Affairs, Ireland (DFA). From 1971 to 1973, he was the 3rd secretary at the Embassy of Ireland, London. From 1973 to 1976, he was the 1st secretary at the DFA.

From 1975 to 1979, Moran served as the Irish Consul-General in San Francisco. He served as counsellor in the DFA from 1980 to 1985 and in the Permanent Representation of Ireland to the European Union from 1985 to 1990.

In 1991, Moran was awarded a European Community Monitor Mission Medal. From 1991 to 1993, he served as Chief of protocol at the DFA. From 1994 to 1999, he served as the 2nd Irish Ambassador to South Korea, in succession to Richard Ryan, who was appointed in 1989 when the embassy was opened.

He served as director of the Political Division at the DFA from 1999 to 2002, before becoming the Irish Ambassador to the OSCE from 2002 to 2007, during which time he was chair of the Informal Working Group on Gender Equality and Anti-Trafficking.

In 2003, Moran gave a statement (Conflict Prevention and Confidence building) at the OSCE Mediterranean Seminar. In it, he addressed the changing global perspectives following recent conflicts in the Middle East and the so-called "clash of civilisations". His focus was on balancing a "respect for diversity and differing cultural outlooks" with "the universality of the fundamental values which bind us all."

From 2007 to 2010, he served as director of the Office of the High Commissioner on National Minorities, with Knut Vollebæk as commissioner.

== Personal life ==
Moran married Aiglie Chryssafitou on 23 June 1974 in Thessaloniki, Greece. He has been retired since January 2012.
