= Mary Aquinas Monaghan =

Irish nun and physician

Sister Dr. Mary Aquinas Monahan

Personal life
- Born: Cathleen Monahan; 30 August 1919 Cartron, Cappataggle, Loughrea, County Galway, Ireland
- Died: 28 November 1985 (aged 66) Ruttonjee sanatorium, Hong Kong
- Education: University College Galway; University College Dublin
- Occupation: Nun, Doctor

Religious life
- Religion: Roman Catholic
- Order: Missionary Sisters of St. Columban

Sister Dr. Mary Aquinas Monaghan MB, FRCP, OBE (30 August 1919 – 28 November 1985) was an Irish Missionary Sister of St. Columban nun and physician, and was among the first four nuns to qualify as physicians in Ireland. She was considered an authority on the treatment and management of tuberculosis.

== Early life and family ==
Mary Aquinas Monaghan was born Cathleen or Kathleen Monaghan in Cartron, Cappataggle, Loughrea, County Galway on 30 August 1919. Her parents were Bartholomew, farmer, and Ellen Monaghan (née O'Sullivan). She was the second eldest of two sons and seven daughters. She attended the local national school and St Michael's Loreto Convent, Navan, County Meath. On 14 April 1939 she joined the Missionary Sisters of St Columban at Caheracon, County Clare, receiving her habit on 1 September 1939, and took the name Sister Mary Aquinas. She professed on 2 September 1947. Monaghan studied science for one year at University College Galway, later attending University College Dublin from 1941 to 1947. After graduating with her medical degree, she was a resident in Our Lady of Lourdes Tuberculosis Sanatorium, Dún Laoghaire, County Dublin, and the Coombe Maternity Hospital, Dublin. She was among the first four nuns to qualify as physicians in Ireland, after the lifting of the papal prohibition on nuns becoming medical doctors and midwives in 1936.

== Career ==
She was first sent on mission to Hanyang, China, but was expelled after the Communist revolution and was reassigned to Hong Kong. The Columban Sisters had been asked to take over a naval hospital in Hong Kong which had been converted into the Ruttonjee Tuberculosis Sanatorium. The Sanatorium, named after Jehangir Hormusjee Ruttonjee, provided free healthcare and was funded by local wealthy people, and was an interfaith non-sectarian hospital for the poor. Its patients were largely refugees from mainland China, and it was tackling a widespread problem with tuberculosis in Hong Kong. To prepare her for her work in Hong Kong, Monaghan studied further at Brompton Chest Hospital, London. Upon her arrival in Hong Kong on 17 January 1949, she was appointed medical superintendent of the Sanatorium. The Sanatorium was then opened on 24 February 1949.

Monaghan oversaw an increase in bed capacity in the Sanatorium, as well as it becoming a centre for research into the treatment of tuberculosis. In 1953 she was awarded a Tuberculosis Disease Diploma (TDD) from University of Wales, Cardiff, followed by her Fellow of the American College of Chest Physicians (FCCP) in 1955, FRCP in 1977. After her year in Cardiff, she toured Scandinavian countries visiting sanatoria and the Pasteur Institute in Paris. She also completed postgraduate studies at the London Hospital and at the Post-Graduate Medical School, Hammersmith, London in 1960.

She lectured in clinical medicine in the University of Hong Kong and in the Chinese University, Hong Kong from 1952. She collaborated closely with the Medical Research Council in England and the Hong Kong Tuberculosis Treatment Service, carrying out studies and trials which made a significant contribution to the treatment and management of tuberculosis internationally. Monaghan was considered an authority on the disease. She was invited to lecture across the world, but with a focus on Asian and African countries. She lectured in Africa extensively later in her life, focusing on communicable diseases in central Africa, and in 1984 she worked in Ethiopia. She undertook a Dow Chemical lecture tour in the Philippines in 1983, and was invited by the Chinese Medical Association to visit institutions and hospitals in Beijing, Xian, Shanghai, and Hangzhou. She spoke at symposia on tuberculosis a number of times in Pakistan in 1984. She represented Hong Kong and read papers at 14 international conferences, and attended at least 17 conferences in different countries as a delegate. She was also widely published in national and international medical journals.

Monaghan received numerous awards, including the WHO fellowship in tuberculosis at the University of Wales in 1952 to 1953, and an honorary doctorate in social science from the University of Hong Kong in 1978. She was the first woman to receive the Sir Robert Philip gold medal from the London Chest and Heart Foundation in 1965. She was awarded an OBE in 1980, and was presented to Queen Elizabeth II in the royal tea tent at the Buckingham Palace garden party on 23 July 1985.

She was a member of various medical and other related organisations, such as the British Medical Association, the Catholic Marriage Advisory Council of Hong Kong, the Society for the Aid of Rehabilitation of Drug Abusers, and the Community Advice Bureau. She served as vice-president of the Hong Kong Medical Association, vice-president of the Federation of Medical Societies of Hong Kong, and president of the Hong Kong branch of the British Medical Association. She also served as the honorary secretary of the Soroptimist International of Hong Kong for nine years and president from 1979 to 1981. She served as editor of the Bulletin of the Hong Kong Medical Association, and a term as master of the Hong Kong branch of the Doctors' Guild of SS Luke, Cosmas, and Damien.

== Death and legacy ==
Monaghan died from cancer on 28 November 1985 in Ruttonjee Sanatorium, and was buried Saint Michael's Catholic Cemetery, in Happy Valley, Hong Kong. Tuberculosis had been largely eradicated from Hong Kong by the time of her death. After her death the Sister Mary Aquinas Memorial Fund for ongoing study of tuberculosis was established. In 1990, the new Ruttonjee 650-bed general hospital opened with the Sister Mary Aquinas Museum on one of the floors. Monaghan was featured as part of an exhibition about Columban missionaries in EPIC Museum, Dublin in 2019.
