= Foil Arms and Hog =

Irish sketch comedy group

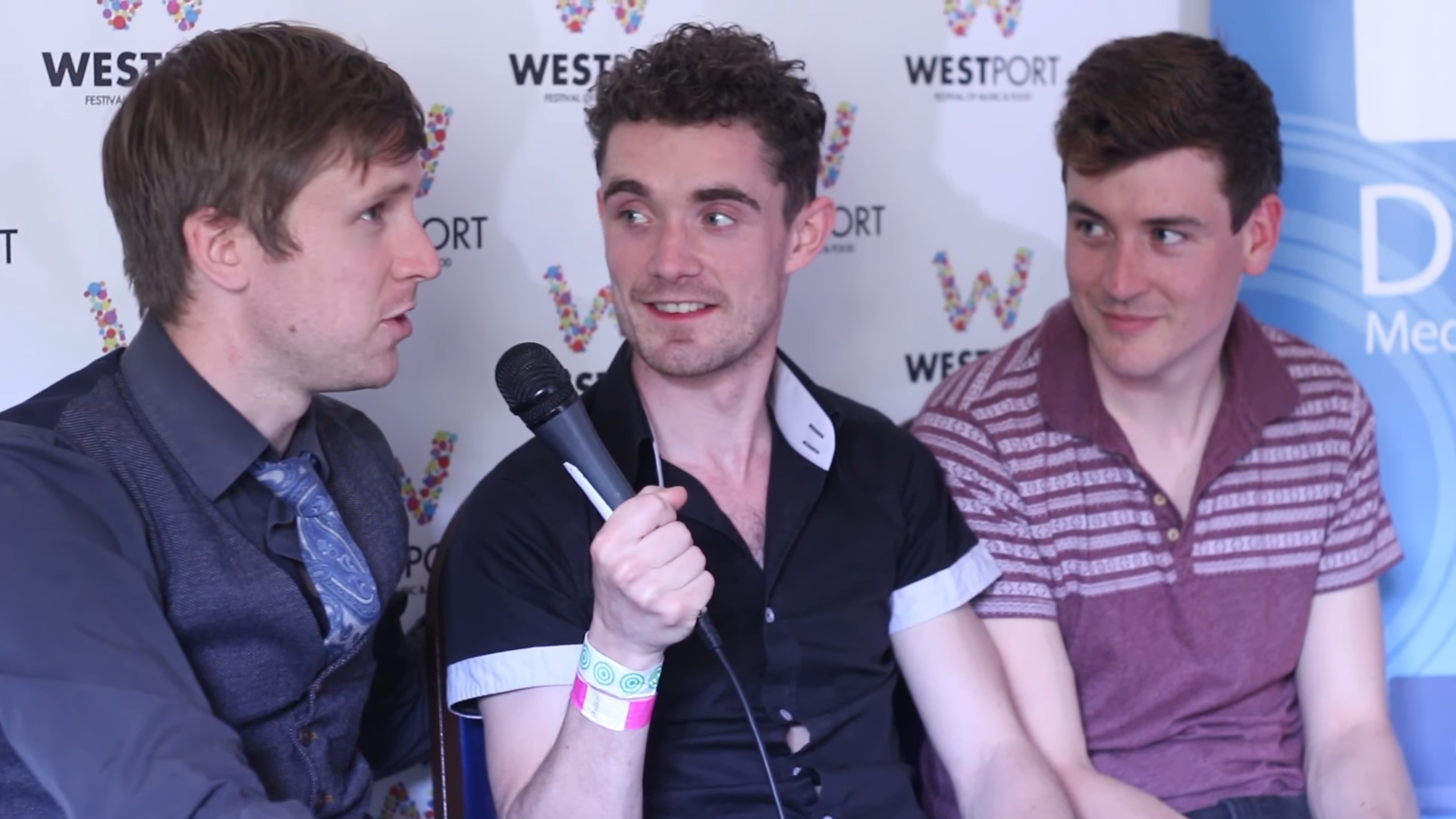
- Foil Arms and Hog in 2014 (from left): Sean 'Foil' Finegan, Sean 'Hog' Flanagan and Conor 'Arms' McKenna
- Education: University College Dublin

Comedy career
- Years active: 2008—present
- Genre: Sketch comedy
- Members: Sean Finegan; Conor McKenna; Sean Flanagan

YouTube information
- Channel: Foil Arms and Hog
- Years active: 2008–present
- Genre: Comedy
- Subscribers: 1.25 million
- Views: 633 million
- Last updated: 1 August 2026
- Website: www.foilarmsandhog.ie

Foil Arms and Hog are an Irish sketch comedy group comprising Sean 'Foil' Finegan, Conor 'Arms' McKenna and Sean 'Hog' Flanagan.

== History ==
=== Background ===
The group formed in 2008, after the trio met in the drama society at University College Dublin, when they were studying architecture, genetics, and engineering, respectively. They were drawn together at first by a love of the TV show Father Ted and a common interest in comedy. This was at a time just after the 2008 financial crisis, and the group say that it "was absolutely the best thing that could have happened. If the Celtic Tiger had still been going and all our mates were making shedloads of cash, we would have been under pressure to get proper jobs. But instead, we had the perfect excuse to play around for a while and see what happened."

=== Name ===
The group's name evolved from nicknames each of the members had for each other. Foil (Sean Finegan) is the comedy foil, Arms (Conor McKenna) is 'All arms and Legs' and Hog (Sean Flanagan) hogs the limelight.

=== Career ===
The group has performed on TV, radio, the stage, and online. The trio write, shoot, and edit a new sketch every week in their office, releasing it on Thursdays for YouTube, Facebook and Instagram. Foil Arms and Hog do not have a specific genre, and make sketches that are often observational and occasionally topical. Popular sketches released to YouTube include 'When Irish People Can't Speak Irish', 'An Englishman Plays Risk', 'WTF is Brexit', 'Countries Guess Who they Are', 'When Meetings are No Longer Online' and 'How to Speak Dublin'. Foil Arms and Hog also perform live shows, primarily in Ireland and the United Kingdom, but also in North America, Australia, and Europe. Since 2009 they have performed at the Edinburgh Festival Fringe.
