= Henry Charles McWeeney =

Irish mathematician and academic

Henry Charles McWeeney (1867–1935) was an Irish mathematician, who was Professor of Mathematics at University College Dublin (UCD) from 1891 until his death in 1935. From 1909 on he served as vice president of UCD.

== Education and career ==
McWeeney was born in Dublin and was educated at University College Dublin (BSc 1887, MSc 1890) and Trinity College Dublin (BA 1889). He won a Royal University of Ireland Travelling Studentship award in 1891, and spent his entire career at UCD. He also taught at St Patrick's College, Drumcondra, from 1892 to 1910.

Speaking of his days as a student at UCD in the mid 1880s, McWeeney remembers listening to the Professor of Mathematics there, John Casey, who had a mixed class of students. "Although the book-work which he communicated would not have been adequate for the training of a higher mathematician, yet his explanations, so far as they went, were marked by extreme lucidity."

It is an interesting fact that on McWeeney’s going first to the Catholic University he had been sent by M'Grath to attend some lectures by Robert Graham, a well-known and successful Tutor of Trinity College, who had joined Fr~Delany's staff. He was author of well-known handbooks of Algebra and of Factors, and was known to be a marvelous expert in preparing for examinations, being familiar with the sort of tricky questions that were often set. But McWeeney found him to be also a first-rate teacher, and attributes chiefly to him the foundation of his own mathematical career.

In the article Mathematics in U.C.D. 1854 to 1974 by J. R. Timoney recalls McWeeney and Egan giving the traditional rite of passage lectures to brand new first year students in the autumn of 1927:

He started to do questions off the entrance scholarship paper, indeed the more outlandish bits of the toughest questions. Fr Egan gave the second lecture. He described it later as his most unintelligible lecture on irrational numbers. This was the honours class clearance act, of course, and things moderated for the hard necks who stuck it out.

Timoney went on to say, "He was a magnificent teacher and a geometer of great elegance. A favourite expression of he was 'if you attack it judiciously it will come out in a line'."
