= Eilis McGovern =

Irish consultant cardiothoracic surgeon

Eilis McGovern FRCSI
- Born: Mountcharles, County Donegal
- Education: St Louis Convent Monaghan
- Alma mater: University College Dublin
- Occupation: Cardiothoracic surgeon

Eilis McGovern FRCSI is an Irish consultant cardiothoracic surgeon. She established Ireland's third public cardiac unit and was the 168th President of the Royal College of Surgeons in Ireland. She became the National Director for medical training at the Health Service Executive, Ireland, in 2012.

== Early life ==
Eilis McGovern was born in 1958 in Mountcharles, County Donegal, and attended school at the St Louis Convent Monaghan.

== Education and training ==
McGovern studied medicine at University College Dublin. When she graduated in 1978, she also won the gold medal in surgery and the silver medal in medicine. After this initial training, she went on to come first in the fellowship examination for the Royal College of Surgeons in Ireland.

== Medical career ==
In 2010, McGovern became the 168th President of the Royal College of Surgeons in Ireland. She was the first woman to hold the position in the 226-year history of the institution.
