= Orla Feely =

President of University College Dublin

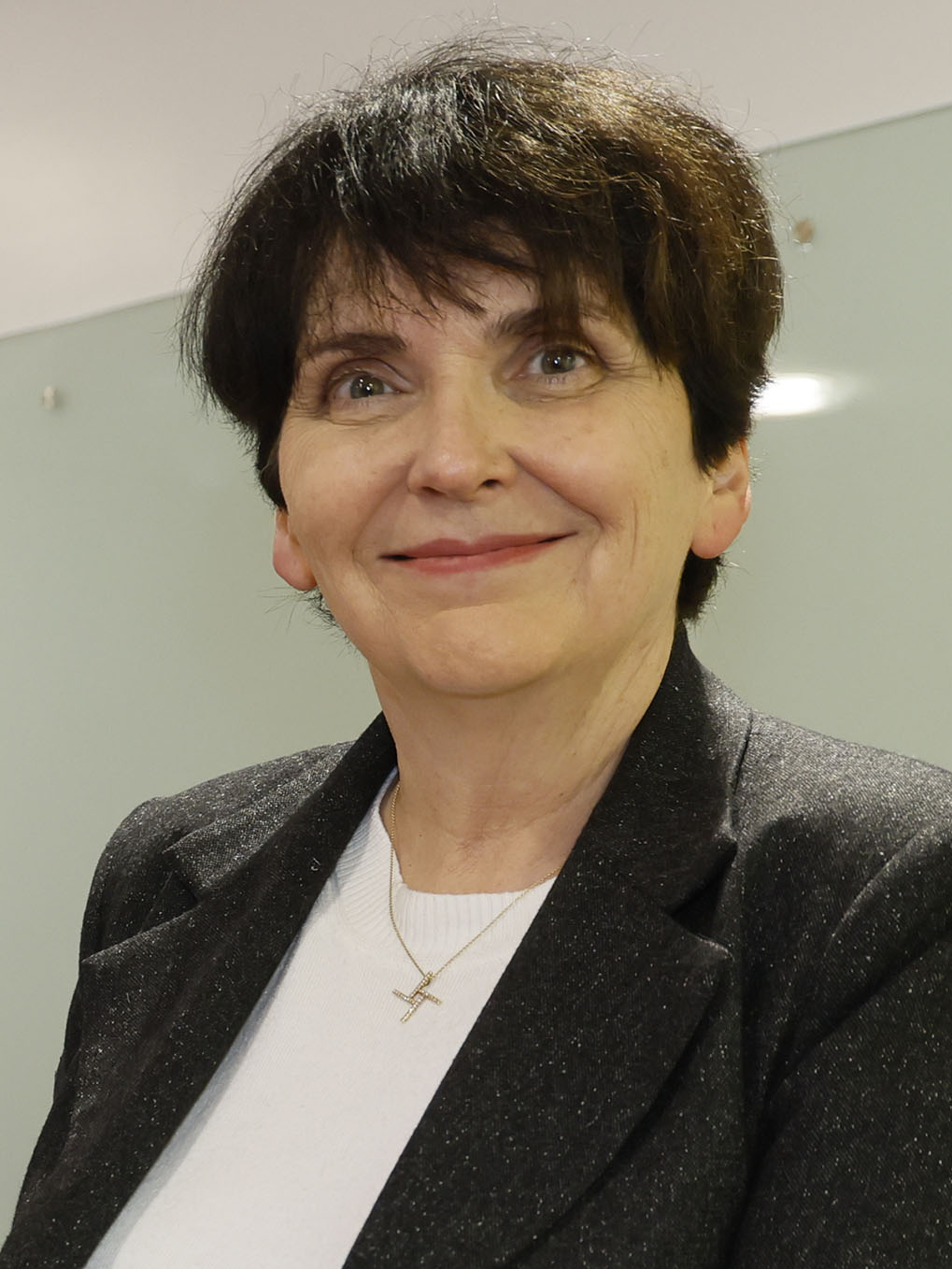
- Feely in 2026

10th President of University College Dublin
- Incumbent
- Assumed office 1 May 2023
- Preceded by: Mark Rogers (acting)

Personal details
- Born: 1966 (age 59–60) Dublin, Ireland
- Education: University College Dublin (BEng, MEng); University of California, Berkeley (MS, PhD)
- Scientific career
- Fields: Electronic engineering
- Institutions: University College Dublin
- Thesis: An Analytical Study of the Nonlinear Dynamics of Sigma Delta Analog-to-Digital Conversion (1992)
- Doctoral advisor: Leon O. Chua

Orla Feely is an Irish academic and professor of electronic engineering. As of 2024, she is the president of University College Dublin (UCD), having previously served as Vice-President for Research, Innovation and Impact. She is also the first Irish woman elected a fellow of the Institute of Electrical and Electronics Engineers.

== Biography ==
Orla Feely was born in Dublin to Ita and Frank Feely. Her father was the city manager for Dublin Corporation. She attended Our Lady's School, Terenure. She got her undergraduate degree in Electronic Engineering from University College, Dublin in 1986 before going to attend the University of California, Berkeley in California where she completed her Masters and PhD. While there she won the DJ Sakrison Memorial Prize. She returned to Ireland to work as a lecturer in UCD's Engineering department in 1992 since which time she has been a full professor with the university and is Vice-President for Research, Innovation and Impact. On 21 February 2023, she was appointed President of UCD, her term beginning on 1 May 2023.

Feely is the first Irish woman elected a fellow of the Institute of Electrical and Electronics Engineers. She is a member of the Royal Irish Academy and a fellow of Engineers Ireland, of which she was president from 2021 to 2022, and the Irish Academy of Engineering. She was Vice-President for Resources and treasurer of the Conference of European Schools of Advanced Engineering Education and Research (CESAER) as well as director of Young Scientist and Technology Exhibition.
