= Dave O'Reilly =

Irish businessman (born 1947)

David J. O'Reilly
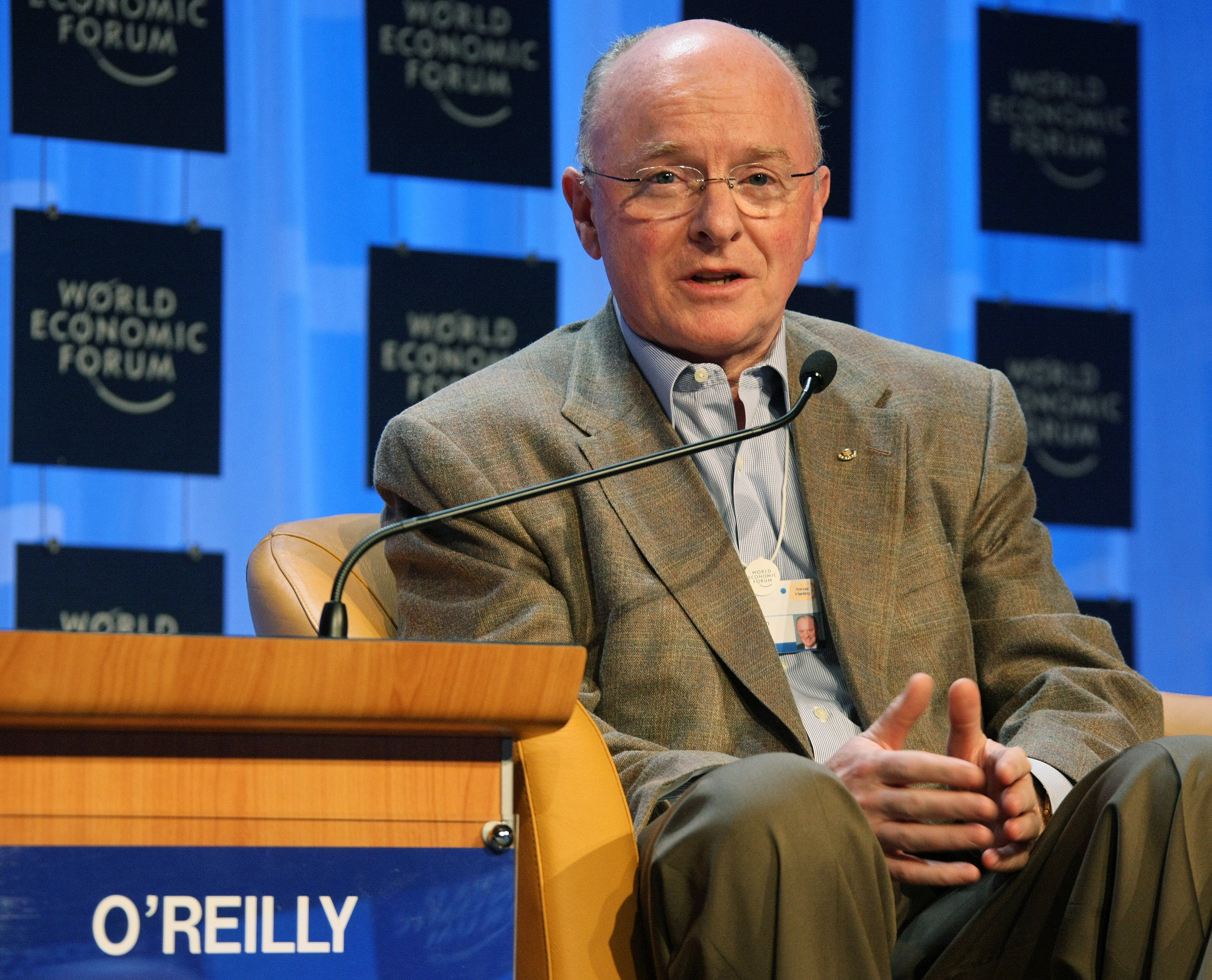
- O'Reilly in 2008
- Born: January 1947 (age 79); Dublin, Ireland
- Education: Blackrock College; University College Dublin (BS)
- Occupation: CEO at Chevron Corporation (2000–09)
- Years active: 1968–present
- Awards: Order of Kurmet; UCD Foundation Day Medal

David J. O'Reilly (born January 1947), is an Irish businessman who was former chairman and CEO of Chevron Corporation.

== Early life and education ==
O'Reilly was born in Dublin in January 1947.

In 1968, he graduated with a bachelor's degree in chemical engineering from University College Dublin, from which he also received an honorary doctor of science degree in June 2002.

== Career ==
He began his career with Chevron Research Co. as a process engineer in 1968. On 1 January 2000, he became chairman and CEO of Chevron, succeeding Kenneth T. Derr. He retired effective 31 December 2009.

In January 2010, O'Reilly joined the Board of engineering and construction giant, Bechtel Corporation. In August 2010, he was appointed a director on the board of Saudi Aramco, the national oil company of Saudi Arabia. He also is vice chairman of the National Petroleum Council. He is a member of The Business Council, J. P. Morgan International Council, the World Economic Forum’s International Business Council, and the American Society of Corporate Executives. O'Reilly also serves on the San Francisco Symphony Board of Governors.

In April 2002, O'Reilly received the Order of Kurmet from Kazakhstan president Nursultan Nazarbaev.

In 2013, O'Reilly was awarded the UCD Foundation Day Medal.
