= McWeeny =

McWeeny is a surname. Notable people with the surname include:

- Doug McWeeny (1896–1953), American baseball player
- Roy McWeeny (1924–2021), English physicist and academic
