= University College Dublin =

Public research university in Ireland

Coordinates: 53°18′30″N 6°13′20″W

- Irish: An Coláiste Ollscoile, Baile Átha Cliath
- Motto: (Latin) Ad Astra; (Irish) Cothrom na Féinne
- Motto in English: To the Stars; Justice and equality
- Type: Public research university
- Established: 1854; 172 years ago
- Founder: John Henry Newman
- Affiliations: AMBA; CESAER; EUA; IUA; NUI; Una Europa; Universitas 21; UI
- Endowment: €685 million (2025)
- Budget: €905 million (2024/25)
- President: Orla Feely
- Academic staff: 1,974
- Administrative staff: 2,379
- Students: 41,089
- Postgraduates: 12,250
- Doctoral students: 2,008
- Location: Dublin, Ireland
- Campus: Urban, 133 hectares (330 acres)
- Language: English, Irish, others
- Newspaper: College Tribune; The University Observer
Colours
- Website: ucd.ie

University College Dublin (Irish: An Coláiste Ollscoile, Baile Átha Cliath), commonly referred to as UCD, is a public research university in Dublin, Ireland, and a member institution of the National University of Ireland. With more than 41,000 students, it is the largest university in Ireland and the largest English-speaking university in the European Union. UCD is a member of the Universitas 21 network of research universities and the Una Europa group of European Universities.

UCD traces its origins to the Catholic University of Ireland, which opened in 1854 with John Henry Newman as its founding Rector. The lectures Newman delivered in Dublin in preparation for the new university were later published as The Idea of a University. The institution has been known as University College Dublin since 1908. Many of its students and staff took part in the struggle for Irish independence, and Dáil Éireann debated and approved the Anglo-Irish Treaty in the university's Earlsfort Terrace Council Chamber in January 1922.

The principal campus is the 133-hectare (330-acre) site at Belfield, six kilometres south of the city centre. All faculties relocated to Belfield from St Stephen's Green and Earlsfort Terrace during the second half of the twentieth century. UCD's former buildings at Earlsfort Terrace and Merrion Street now house the National Concert Hall and Government Buildings. The Belfield campus holds the National Folklore Collection, whose Irish Folklore Commission archive is inscribed on UNESCO's Memory of the World Register. A second campus site in Blackrock houses the Michael Smurfit Graduate Business School. As of 2026, UCD has three joint international colleges in China.

UCD is ranked as a top 100 global university in the QS World University Rankings as of 2026. Its researchers have won 35 European Research Council grants under the EU's Horizon Europe programme worth €73 million and more than 40 per cent of Ireland's total, and secured €847 million in external research funding in the five years to 2025. Students and staff designed and built EIRSAT-1, Ireland's first satellite, which launched in 2023.

UCD's alumni include the writers James Joyce, Maeve Binchy, and Roddy Doyle; actors Gabriel Byrne and Brendan Gleeson; broadcasters Pat Kenny, Dara Ó Briain, and Miriam O'Callaghan; business people Tony O'Reilly and Denis O'Brien; professional athletes Brian O'Driscoll, Katie Taylor, and Shane Lowry; seven Presidents of the GAA; seven European commissioners; eleven Chief Justices of the Irish Supreme Court; several Taoisigh and Presidents of Ireland; and Nobel Laureate Seán MacBride. Notable current and recent academic staff include the historian Diarmaid Ferriter; economist Morgan Kelly; political scientist David Farrell; novelist Anne Enright; and former Chief Medical Officer Tony Holohan. Thirty UCD students and graduates competed at the 2024 Summer Olympics.

== History ==
UCD can trace its history to the institution founded in 1854 as the Catholic University of Ireland. Renamed University College in 1883 and put under the control of the Jesuits in 1883, it became University College Dublin in 1908, a constituent college of the National University of Ireland under the Universities Act.

=== Catholic University of Ireland ===
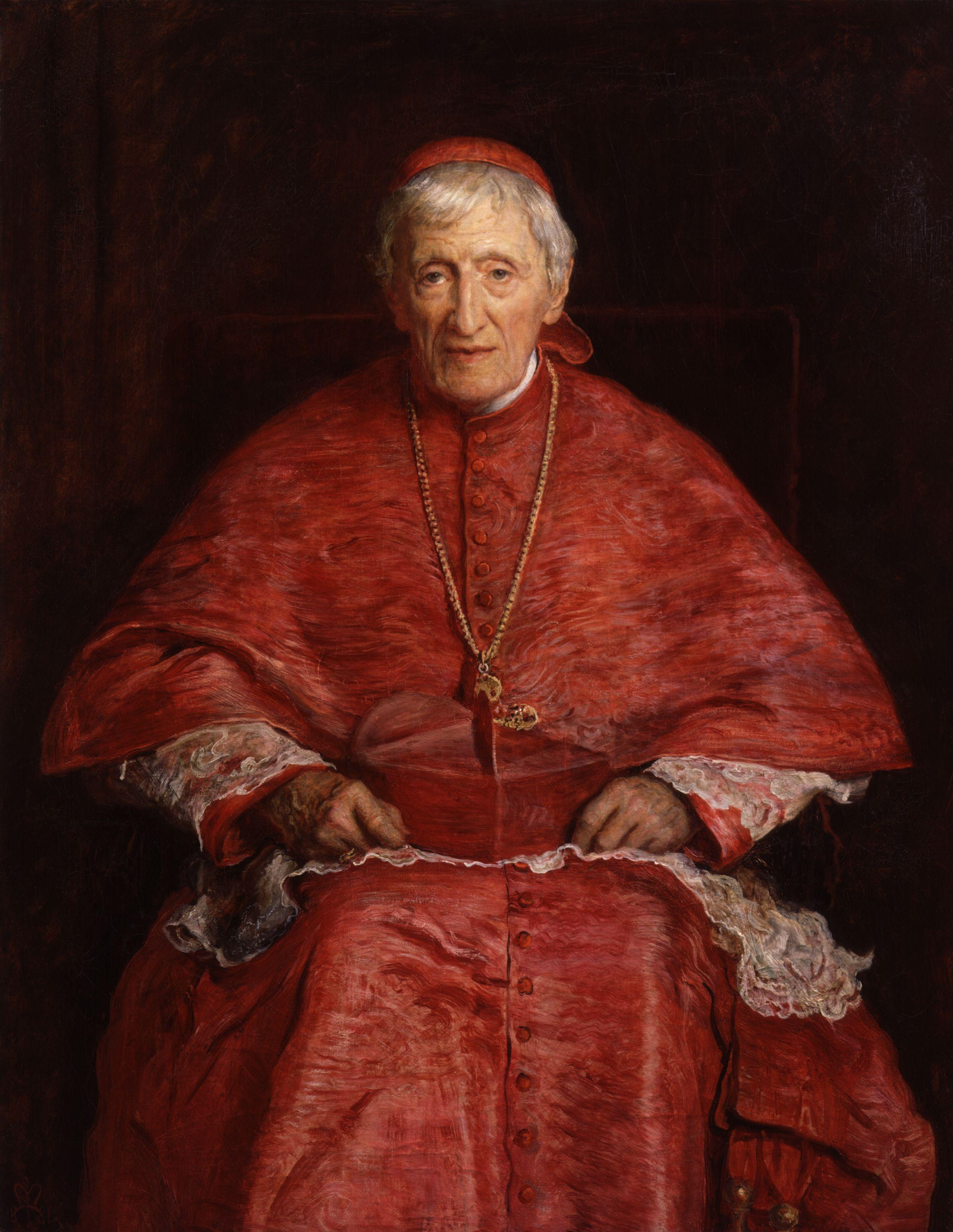
Saint John Henry Newman, first rector of the then Catholic University of Ireland, out of which sprang the current UCD

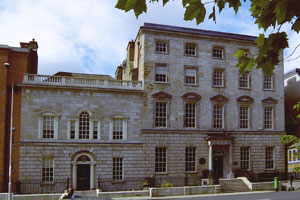
Newman house, St Stephen's Green, Dublin. The original location of UCD

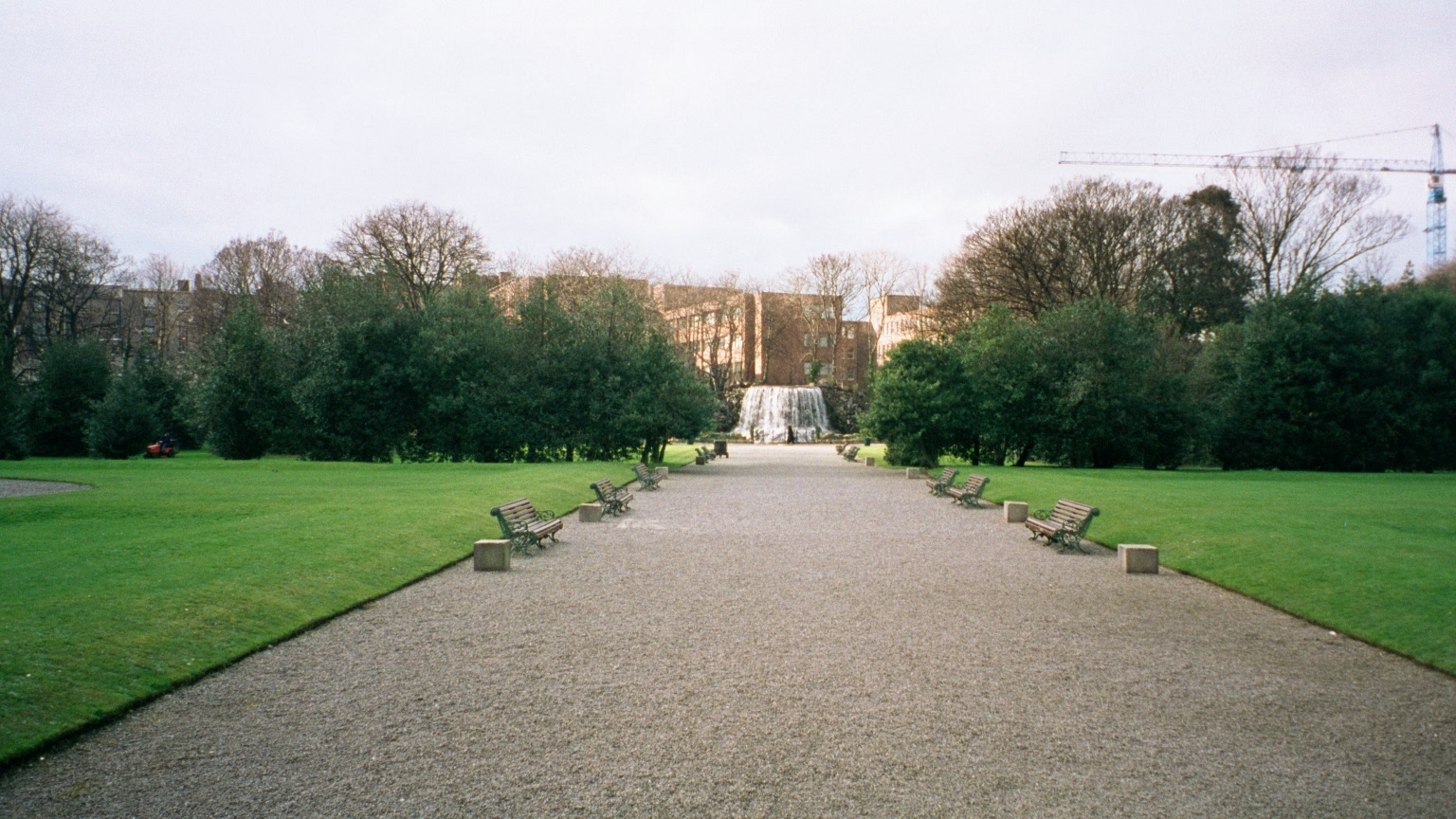
The Gardens located behind Earlsfort Terrace donated and renamed in his honour by UCD in 1908

After the Catholic Emancipation period of Irish history, the Archbishop of Armagh attempted to provide, for the first time in Ireland, higher-level education for followers of the Catholic Church and taught by such people. The Catholic hierarchy demanded a Catholic alternative to the University of Dublin's Trinity College, whose Anglican origins the hierarchy refused to overlook. Since the 1780s, the University of Dublin had admitted Catholics to study; a religious test, however, hindered the efforts of Catholics in their desire to obtain membership in the university's governing bodies. Thus, in 1850 at the Synod of Thurles, it was decided to open a university in Dublin for Catholics.

As a result of these efforts, a new "Catholic University of Ireland" opened in 1854 on St Stephen's Green, with John Henry Newman appointed as its first rector. The Catholic University opened its doors on the feast of St Malachy, 3 November 1854. In 1855, the Catholic University Medical School was opened on Cecilia Street.

As a private university, Catholic University was never given a royal charter, and so was unable to award recognised degrees and suffered from chronic financial difficulties. Newman left the university in 1857. In 1861, Bartholomew Woodlock was appointed Rector and served until he became Bishop of Ardagh and Clonmacnoise in 1879. Henry Neville was appointed Rector to replace Woodlock.

In 1880, the Royal University of Ireland was established and allowed students from any college to take examinations for a degree.

=== Foundation of University College Dublin ===
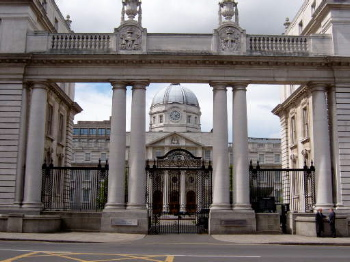
Government Buildings, Dublin. The former location of the UCD science and engineering faculties. Opened by King George V in 1905

In 1882, Catholic University reorganised, and the St Stephen's Green institution (the former Arts school of the Catholic University) run by the Irish Jesuits, was renamed University College, and it began participating in the Royal University system. In 1883, Fr William Delany SJ was appointed the first president of University College. The college attracted academics from around Ireland, including Fr. Gerard Manley Hopkins and James Joyce. Some notable staff and students at the school during this early period included Patrick Pearse, Thomas MacDonagh, Kevin Barry, Eoin MacNeill, Kevin O'Higgins, Francis Sheehy-Skeffington, Tom Kettle, James Ryan, Douglas Hyde, Rory O'Connor and John A. Costello.

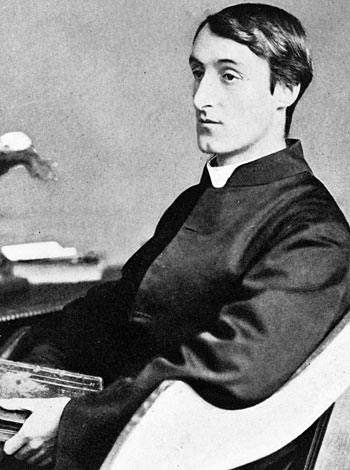
Gerard Manley Hopkins, one of the leading Victorian poets of the 19th Century, Professor of Greek and Latin

In 1908, the National University of Ireland was founded and the following year the Royal University was dissolved. This new university was brought into existence with three constituent University Colleges – Dublin, Galway and Cork. Following the establishment of the NUI, D. J. Coffey, Professor of Physiology, Catholic University Medical School, became the first president of UCD. The Medical School in Cecilia Street became the UCD Medical Faculty and the Faculty of Commerce was established. Under the Universities Act, 1997, University College Dublin was established as a constituent university within the National University of Ireland framework.

In 1911, land donated by Lord Iveagh helped the university expand in Earlsfort Terrace/Hatch Street/ St Stephen's Green. Iveagh Gardens was part of this donation.

Coat of arms of University College Dublin

Notes
Granted 14 September 1911 by Nevile Wilkinson, Ulster King of Arms.
Escutcheon
Vert a harp Or stringed Argent on a chief of the second on a pale Argent between two trefoils slipped Vert three castles flamant Proper.
Motto
Ad Astra and Comtrom Féinne

=== UCD and the Irish War of Independence ===
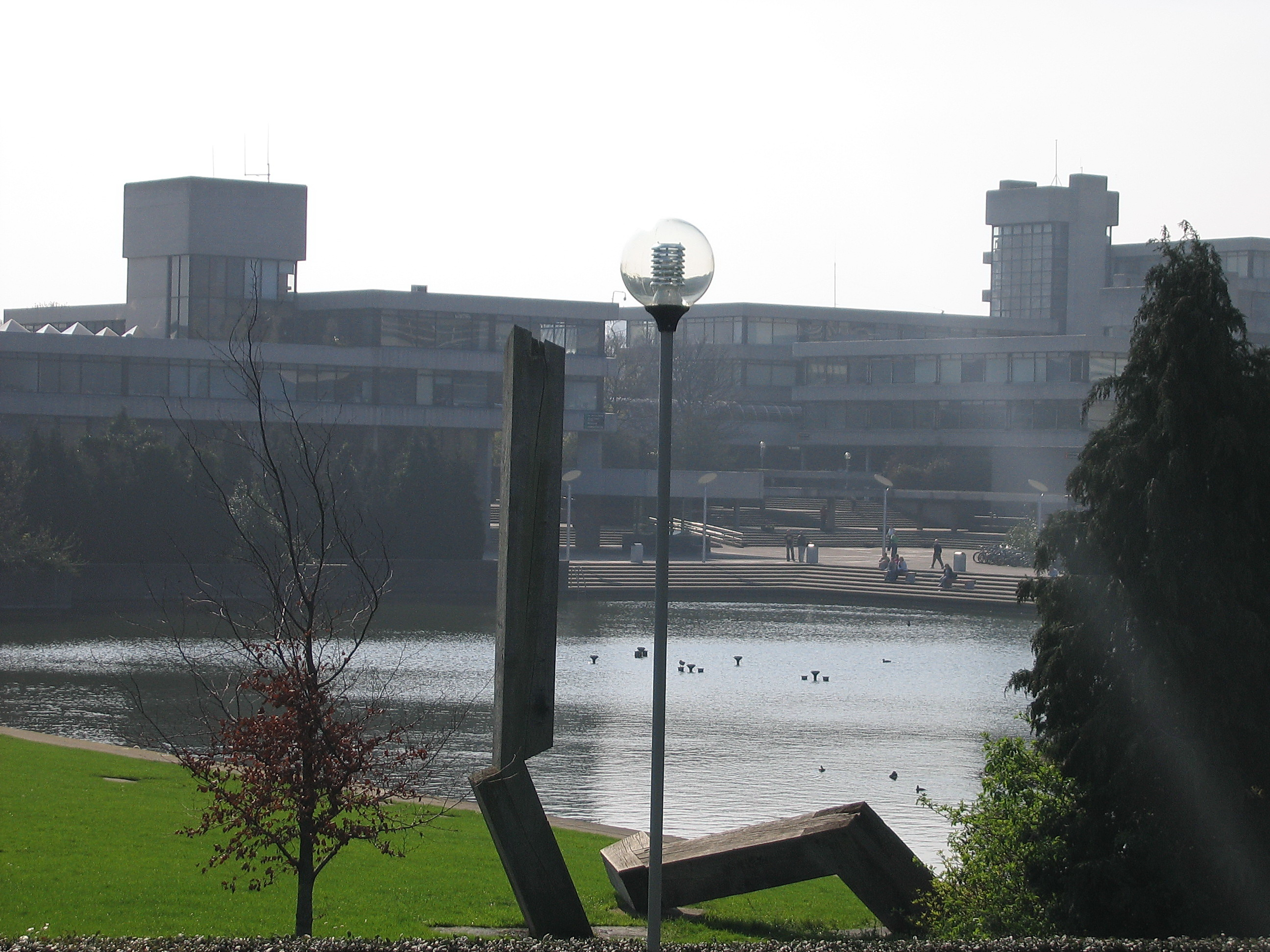
The Tierney (Administration) and Newman (Arts) Buildings, Belfield campus, UCD.

UCD is a major holder of archives of national and international significance relating to the Irish War of Independence.

In 1913, in response to the formation of the Ulster Volunteers, Eóin MacNeill, professor of early Irish history, called for the formation of an Irish nationalist force to counteract it. The Irish Volunteers were formed later that year and MacNeill was elected its Chief-of-staff. At the outbreak of World War I, in view of the Home Rule Act 1914 and the political perception that it might not be implemented, the leader of the Home Rule Party, John Redmond, urged the Irish Volunteers to support the British war effort as a way of supporting Irish Home Rule. This effort on behalf of Home Rule included many UCD staff and students. Many of those who opposed this move later participated in the Easter Rising.

Several UCD staff and students participated in the rising, including Pádraig Pearse, Thomas MacDonagh, Michael Hayes, Kevin Barry and James Ryan, and a smaller number, including Tom Kettle and Willie Redmond, fought for the British in World War I.

Many UCD staff, students and alumni fought in the Irish War of Independence. Following the signing of the Anglo-Irish Treaty, four UCD graduates joined the government of the Irish Free State.

UCD graduates have since participated in Irish political life – three of the ten Presidents of Ireland and five of the fifteen Taoisigh have been either former staff or graduates.

=== Expansion ===
In 1926, the University Education (Agriculture and Dairy Science) Act transferred the Royal College of Science in Merrion Street and Albert Agricultural College in Glasnevin to UCD. In 1933, Belfield House was purchased for sporting purposes.

=== Move to Belfield ===
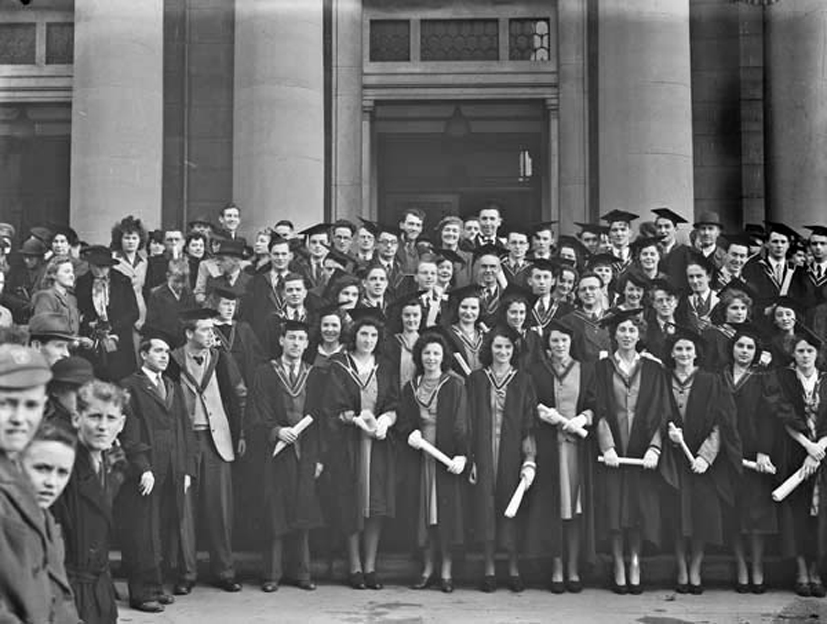
UCD graduates, 15 July 1944

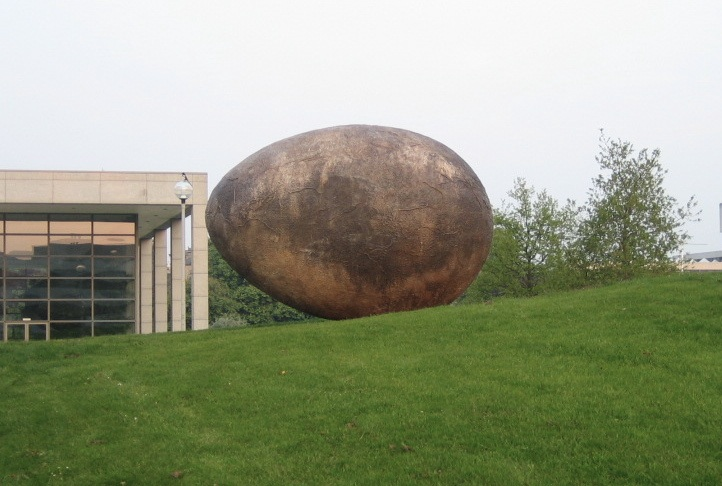
'Noah's egg' outside the Veterinary School by Rachel Joynt (2004)

In 1940, Arthur Conway was appointed president. By the early 1940s, the college had become the largest third-level institution in the state and the college attempted to expand the existing city centre campus. It was later decided that the best solution would be to move the college to a larger greenfield site outside of the city centre and create a modern campus university. This move started in the early 1960s when the faculty of science moved to the new 1.4 square kilometres (350 acres) park campus at Belfield in a suburb on the south side of Dublin. The Belfield campus developed into a complex of modern buildings and inherited Georgian townhouses, accommodating the colleges of the university as well as its student residences and many leisure and sporting facilities.

One of UCD's previous locations, the Royal College of Science on Merrion Street, is now the location of the renovated Irish Government Building, where the Department of the Taoiseach (Irish prime minister) is situated. University College Dublin also had a site in Glasnevin for much of the last century, the Albert Agricultural College, the southern part of which is now occupied by Dublin City University, the northern part is where parts of the suburb of Ballymun are located.

The Belfield campus has more than 50,000 trees, along with 8km of woodland walks; some of its mature trees date from the 18th and early 19th centuries, when the land was still under private ownership.

==== Architecture ====
The new campus was largely designed by A&D Wejchert & Partners Architects and includes several notable structures, including the UCD Water Tower which was built in 1972 by John Paul Construction. The Tower won the 1979 Irish Concrete Society Award. It stands 60 metres high with a dodecahedron tank atop a pentagonal pillar. The Tower is part of the UCD Environmental Research Station. O'Reilly Hall, opened in 1994, was designed by the Irish architecture firm Scott Tallon Walker.

=== 1950–2000 ===
In 1964, Jeremiah Hogan was appointed president and Thomas E. Nevin led the science faculty to move to a new campus at Belfield. Also that year, UCD became the first university in Europe to launch an MBA programme. In 1967, Donogh O'Malley proposed a plan to merge UCD and Trinity. Between 1969 and 1970, the Faculties of Commerce, Arts and Law moved to Belfield. In 1972, Thomas Murphy was appointed president. In 1973, the library opened. In 1980, the college purchased Richview and 17.4 acres and the architecture faculty moved there. In 1981, the Sports Complex opened. In 1986, Patrick Masterson was appointed president.

From the 1980s until his death in January 2021, a solitary, non-verbal homeless man affectionately known as Old Man Belfield became a fixture of campus life at Belfield, becoming well known to students and staff alike. The man, whose real name was Michael Byrne, slept rough on campus for the last 30, if not 40 years, of his life. Despite not speaking, he came to be "loved and respected by generations of students and staff" and accepted as "part of the UCD community".

During the 1990s, some of the students of Women's Studies, led by Niamh Nolan, petitioned to rename their Gender Studies building after Hanna Sheehy-Skeffington to honour her contribution to women's rights and equal access to third-level education. Her husband Francis Sheehy-Skeffington was himself an alumnus of the university and Hanna of the Royal University, a sister university of UCD. Their campaign was successful and the building was renamed the Hanna Sheehy-Skeffington Building.

In 1990, UCD purchased Carysfort College, Blackrock, and became the location of the Smurfit Graduate school of business. The first student village, Belgrove, opened that year as well. In 1992, the second student village, Merville, opened and the Centre for Film studies was established. In 1993, Art Cosgrove was appointed president. In 1994, O'Reilly Hall was opened.

In Malaysia, UCD and Royal College of Surgeons in Ireland (RCSI) owns a private medical university RCSI & UCD Malaysia Campus (RUMC) within George Town, Penang. Established in 1996, RUMC, as a branch campus of UCD, offers a twinning programme in medicine where students spend the first half of their course in either RCSI or UCD, before completing their clinical years at RUMC.

=== 2000s ===
In 2003, NovaUCD, a Euro Innovation and Technology Transfer Centre, opened. In 2004, Hugh Brady was appointed president. In 2006, UCD Horizons begins. In 2009, Trinity and UCD announce the Innovation Alliance. In 2010, NCAD and UCD form an academic alliance. In 2012 the expanded Student and Sports Centre opened. In 2012, the college closed the athletics track and field facilities and students demanded an apology. In 2013, the UCD O'Brien Centre for Science opened and the UCD Sutherland School of Law opened. It is now the largest Common Law law school in the European Union. In 2015, UCD opened a global centre in the US. In 2019, UCD became the first Irish university to launch a Black Studies module, coordinated by Dr Ebun Joseph and Prof Kathleen Lynch. In March 2022 Prof Andrew Deeks resigned to take up the role of vice-Chancellor at Murdoch University, in Perth, Western Australia. Prof Mark Rogers was appointed acting president.

== Academic ==
=== Colleges and schools ===
Health Sciences building, Belfield campus, UCD designed by Murray Ó Laoire Architects

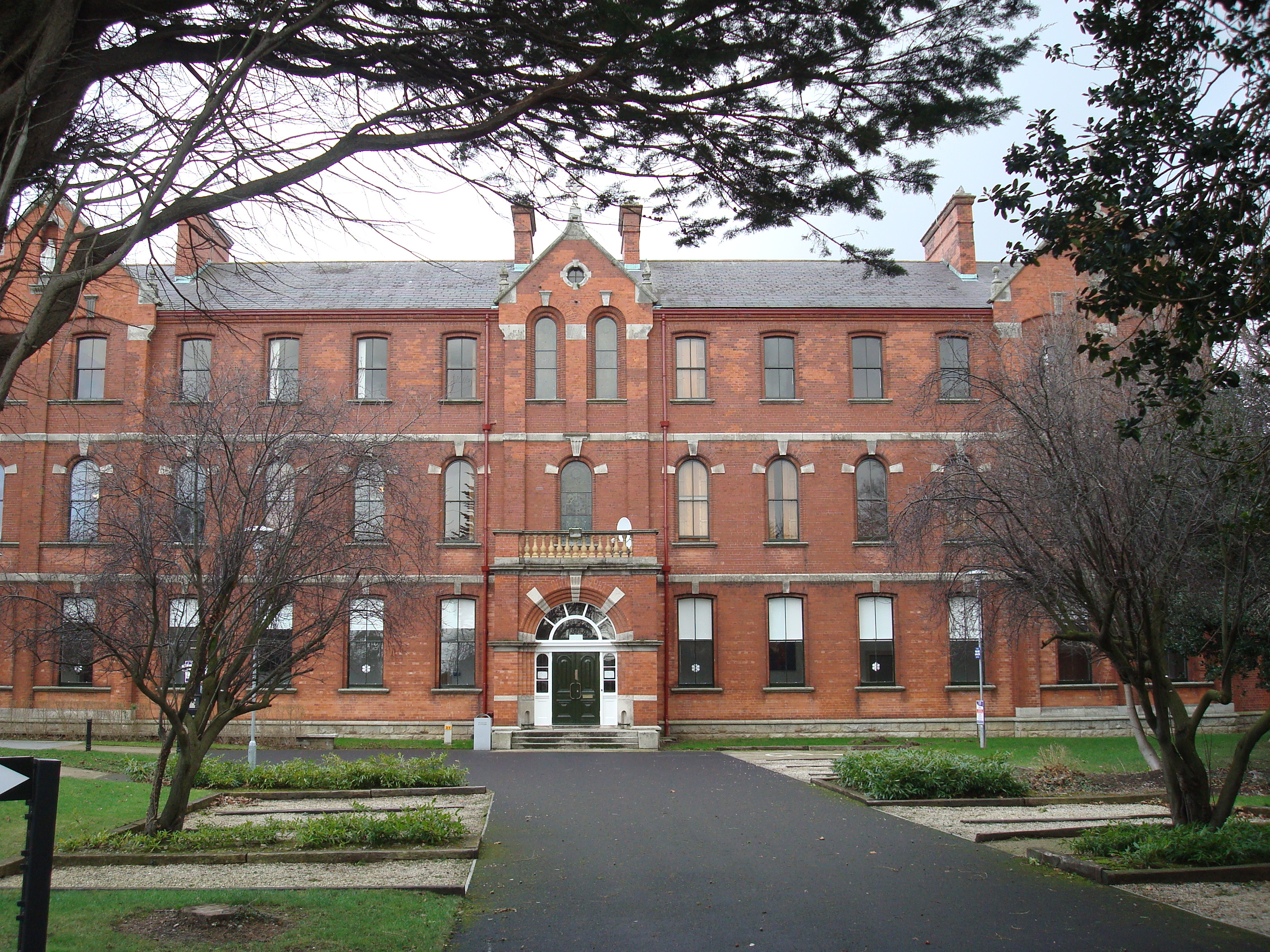
Michael Smurfit Graduate School of Business, Blackrock

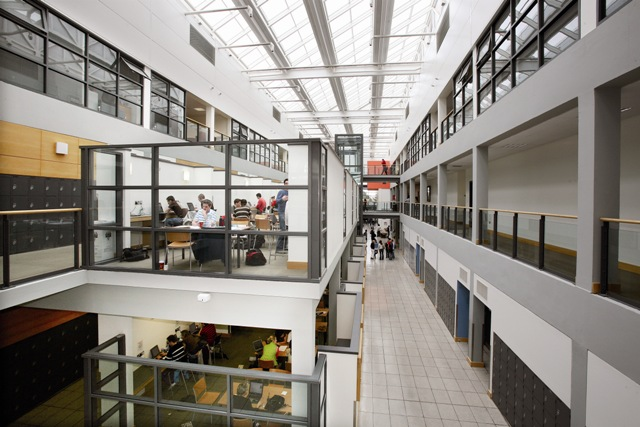
UCD Quinn School of Business

UCD consists of six colleges, their associated schools (37 in total) and multiple research institutes and centres. Each college also has its own Graduate School, for postgraduates.

List of colleges and their respective schools following restructuring in September 2015.

UCD College of Arts and Humanities
UCD School of Art History and Cultural Policy
UCD School of Classics
UCD School of English, Drama and Film
UCD School of History and Archives
UCD School of Irish, Celtic Studies and Folklore
UCD School of Languages, Cultures and Linguistics
UCD School of Music
UCD College of Business
UCD School of Business

UCD Lochlann Quinn School of Business
UCD Michael Smurfit Graduate School of Business

UCD College of Engineering and Architecture
UCD School of Architecture, Planning and Environmental Policy
UCD School of Biosystems and Food Engineering
UCD School of Chemical and Bioprocess Engineering
UCD School of Civil Engineering
UCD School of Electrical and Electronic Engineering
UCD School of Mechanical and Materials Engineering
UCD College of Health and Agricultural Sciences
UCD School of Agriculture and Food Science
UCD School of Medicine
UCD School of Nursing, Midwifery and Health Systems
UCD School of Public Health, Physiotherapy and Sports Science
UCD School of Veterinary Medicine
UCD College of Social Sciences and Law
UCD School of Archaeology
UCD School of Economics
UCD School of Education
UCD School of Geography
UCD School of Information and Communication Studies
UCD School of Law
UCD School of Philosophy
UCD School of Politics and International Relations
UCD School of Psychology
UCD School of Social Policy, Social Work and Social Justice
UCD School of Sociology
UCD College of Science

The UCD College of Science has seven schools (listed below) as well as Research Centres and Institutes.

- UCD School of Biology and Environmental Science
- UCD School of Biomolecular and Biomedical Science
- UCD School of Chemistry
- UCD School of Computer Science
- UCD School of Earth Sciences
- UCD School of Mathematics and Statistics
- UCD School of Physics

=== UCD College of Business ===
The UCD College of Business is made up of the Quinn School of Business, the Michael Smurfit Graduate Business School, and UCD Business International Campus. The former constituent school, the UCD Quinn School of Business (commonly The Quinn School), is the building in which the UCD College of Business's undergraduate programme is based. It is located in a three-story building on the Belfield campus and is named after Lochlann Quinn, one of the main financial contributors to the school. Other donors included Bank of Ireland, AIB, Irish Life & Permanent, Accenture, KPMG, PwC, Dunnes Stores and Ernst & Young. When first opened in 2002, it claimed to be the only business school in Europe with a specific focus on technology and e-learning.

=== UCD Professional Academy ===
UCD is also home to UCD Professional Academy, which offers career development through a range of Professional Academy Diplomas. Subject areas include Business, IT, Management, Marketing and Design.

=== Fees ===
Undergraduate fees are funded in part by the Irish State (for EU citizens) and by students themselves under the "Free Fees Initiative". Postgraduate fees vary depending on the student nationality, course and degree type, ranging under €5,000 to over €29,000 per year.

== Reputation ==
=== Patrons and benefactors ===
Amongst the most recent patrons include actor Gregory Peck, who was a founding patron of the School of Film. Other benefactors include Lochlann Quinn (UCD Quinn School of Business), Michael Smurfit (Michael Smurfit Graduate Business School), Peter Sutherland (Sutherland School of Law), Tony O'Reilly (O'Reilly Hall) and Denis O'Brien (O'Brien Science Centre).

=== Rankings ===
University rankings

Global – Overall
- ARWU World: 301–400 (2025)
- QS World: =100 (2027)
- QS Employability: 87 (2022)
- THE World: 201–250 (2025)
- USNWR Global: =245 (2026)

National – Overall
- ARWU National: 2–3 (2025)
- QS National: 2 (2027)
- THE National: 2 (2025)
- USNWR National: 2 (2026)

In the 2025 QS World University Rankings, UCD was ranked as 38th in Europe and 100th in the world. The 2022 QS World University Rankings for employability and reputation rate UCD as first in Ireland and 87th in the world. The QS Subject Rankings for 2026 placed thirteen subjects in the World Top 100, with four (English, Veterinary Science, Petroleum Engineering, and Nursing) in the top 50.

The 2023 Times Higher Education World University Rankings placed UCD in the range of 201–250. It also ranked it 101–200th in the 2022 Impact Rankings.

The 2024 U.S. News & World Report ranked UCD as the second best university in Ireland and 253rd globally.

UCD's Michael Smurfit Graduate Business School is ranked 23rd in the Financial Times' ranking of leading European Business Schools in 2025 and 1st in Ireland.

UCD was The Sunday Times University of the Year 2006 and 2020.

== Research and innovation ==
UCD had a research income of €155.7 million during 2021/22.

The School of Physics hosts research groups in Astrophysics, space science and relativity theory (members of the VERITAS and INTEGRAL experiments) and Experimental particle physics (participating in the Large Hadron Collider experiments LHCb and CMS).

=== Research institutes ===
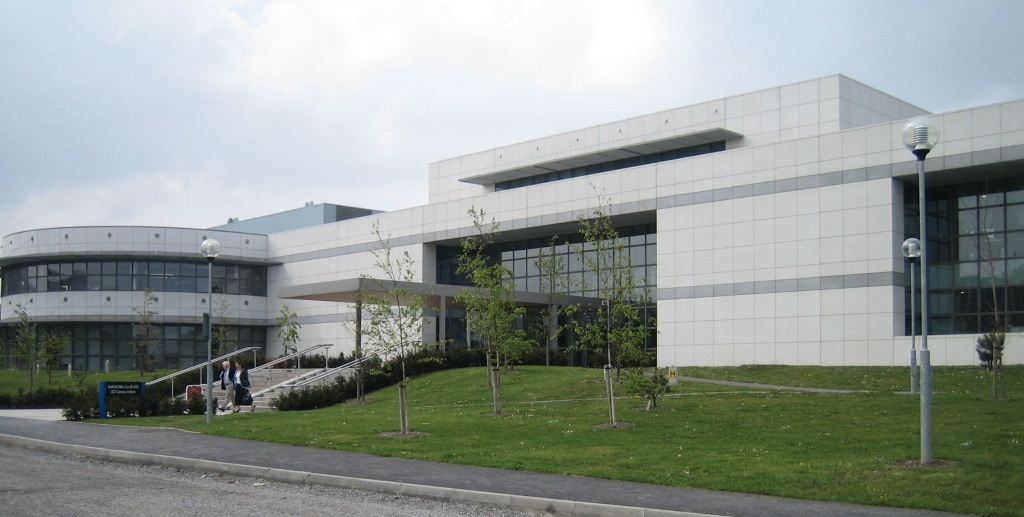
The Conway Institute, Belfield campus, UCD

Front entrance, NovaUCD

Amongst the research institutes of the university are:

- Centre for Cybersecurity & Cybercrime Investigation

- UCD Clinton Institute
- UCD Conway Institute
- UCD Institute of Food & Health
- UCD Earth Institute
- UCD Energy Institute
- UCD Geary Institute for Public Policy
- UCD Humanities Institute
- UCD Mícheál Ó Cléirigh Institute – for the Study of Irish History and Civilisation. Founded in 2000 as part of the UCD-OFM (Order of Friars Minor) Partnership which also initiated the transfer of the priceless Irish Franciscan archive to UCD, which included the papers of Eamon De Valera.

=== External collaborations ===
Wide partnerships in which UCD is involved include:

- Adaptive Information Cluster (with DCU)
- Centre for Innovation and Structural Change (with NUI Galway and DCU)
- Centre for research on adaptive nanostructures and nanodevices (with TCD and UCC)
- CTVR Centre for Telecommunications Value-Chain-Driven Research (with DCU, TCD, NUI Maynooth, UCC, UL, DIT and Sligo IT).
- National Digital Research Centre (with Dublin City University and Trinity College Dublin).
- National Institute for Bioprocessing Research and Training (with Dublin City University, Trinity College Dublin and Sligo IT).
- Programme for Research on Grid-enabled Computational Physics of Natural Phenomena (with DCU, TCD, UCC DIAS, NUI Galway, HEAnet, Met Éireann, Armagh Observatory and Grid Ireland).
- Advanced Biomimetic Materials for Solar Energy Conversion with the University of Limerick, Dublin City University, Airtricity, OBD-Tec and Celtic Catalysts.

=== Current and former campus companies ===
The most prominent UCD-related company is the IE Domain Registry; many UCD academics continue to sit on the board of directors. UCD originally gained control of the .ie domain in the late 1980s.

The NovaUCD initiative is UCD's innovation and technology transfer centre, funded through a public-private partnership. In 2004, Duolog relocated its Dublin headquarters to NovaUCD.

=== Satellite development ===
The Educational Irish Research Satellite 1, or EIRSAT-1, was a CubeSat developed at UCD with the support of the Education Office of the European Space Agency. It was Ireland's first satellite, launched on 1 December 2023.

== Student life ==
=== Students' Union ===
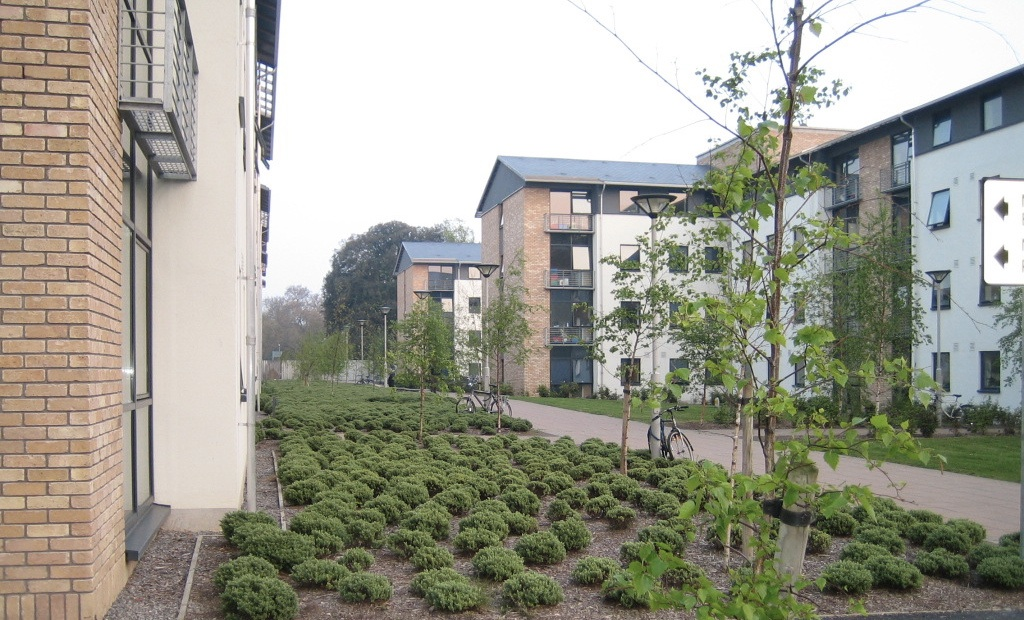
Glenomena student residences, Belfield campus, UCD

The students' union in the college has been an active part of campaigns run by the National Union, USI, and has played a role in the life of the college since its foundation in 1974.

The Union has also taken stances on issues of human rights that have attracted attention in Ireland and around the world; in particular, it implemented a ban of Coca-Cola products in Student Union controlled shops on the basis of alleged human and trade union rights abuses in Colombia. This ban was overturned in 2010.

=== Sport ===
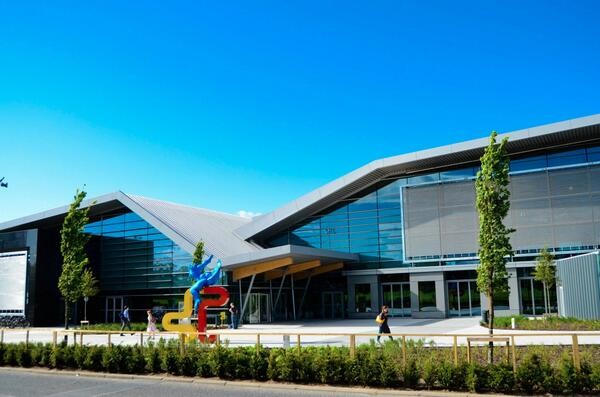
UCD Student Centre 2012

UCD has over 60 sports clubs based on campus with 28 sports scholarships awarded annually.

UCD competes in the most popular Irish field sports of Gaelic games, hurling, soccer and rugby union. UCD is the only Irish university to compete in both the major Irish leagues for rugby and soccer, with University College Dublin A.F.C. and University College Dublin R.F.C. competing in the top leagues of their respective competitions. UCD GAA have won the most Sigerson Cup (Gaelic football) titles, whilst they have the second most Fitzgibbon Cup (hurling) wins, both the major university competitions in the sports in Ireland.

UCD sport annually compete in the Colours Match with Trinity College Dublin in a range of sports, including in rugby. The rugby side has won 35 of the 57 contests. UCD RFC has produced 13 British and Irish Lions as well 70 Irish Rugby International and 5 for other nations.

In 1985, UCD drew with Everton F.C. in the first round of the UEFA Cup Winners' Cup, which Everton went on to win.

Other team sports in the college basketball side, UCD Marian, victors in the 2012 Irish Basketball Superleague.

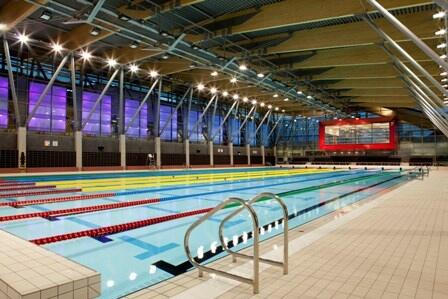
UCD 50-metre pool

The Belfield campus is home to a number of sports facilities. These include the National Hockey stadium (which has previously hosted the Women's Hockey World Cup Finals and the Men's Hockey European Championship Finals) and UCD Bowl a 3,000 capacity stadium used for rugby and soccer. UCD has one of the largest fitness centres in the country, squash courts, tennis courts, an indoor rifle range, over twenty sports pitches (for rugby, soccer and Gaelic games), an indoor climbing wall and two large sports halls. The Sportscenter was added to in 2012 with the competition of an Olympic-size swimming pool, a tepidarium and an updated fitness center as part of the re-development of the UCD Student Centre.

UCD hosted the IFIUS World Interuniversity Games in October 2006.

UCD Boat Club represents the college in rowing. Crews train on the River Liffey at Islandbridge and on Poulaphouca Reservoir in Blessington, in addition to land-based training on campus. The UCD men's eight were victorious at the Henley Royal Regatta in 1974. In later years, the club has had successes in both ladies' and men's rowing. UCD ladies have won many National Senior Championships, most recently in 2015. As of 2025, UCD were the champions in the men's Senior 8 oar event, having won this event for five consecutive years. (Note: No championships 2020 (COVID) and 2024 (scheduling error)) UCD have also held national titles also in men's Senior 4 oar and Novice 8 oar championships. Several members of the club have represented Ireland at the World Championships and Olympic Games. The club competes annually in the Gannon Cup – the colours race against Trinity College on the Liffey. The event was first contested in 1947. As of 2026, the record in the competition is 38 victories for UCD versus 37 for Trinity with one dead heat. UCD Ladies compete for the Corcoran cup for the colours with UCD having won 28 times to 17 by Trinity.

=== Leinster Rugby ===
Leinster Rugby's headquarters and training facility are located on campus, housing the academy, senior squad and administrative arms of the rugby club. Their facilities include an office block and a high performance facility, located next to the Institute of Sport and Health (ISH). It was completed in 2012 at a cost of 2.5 million euro. They also use UCD's pitches.

=== Societies ===
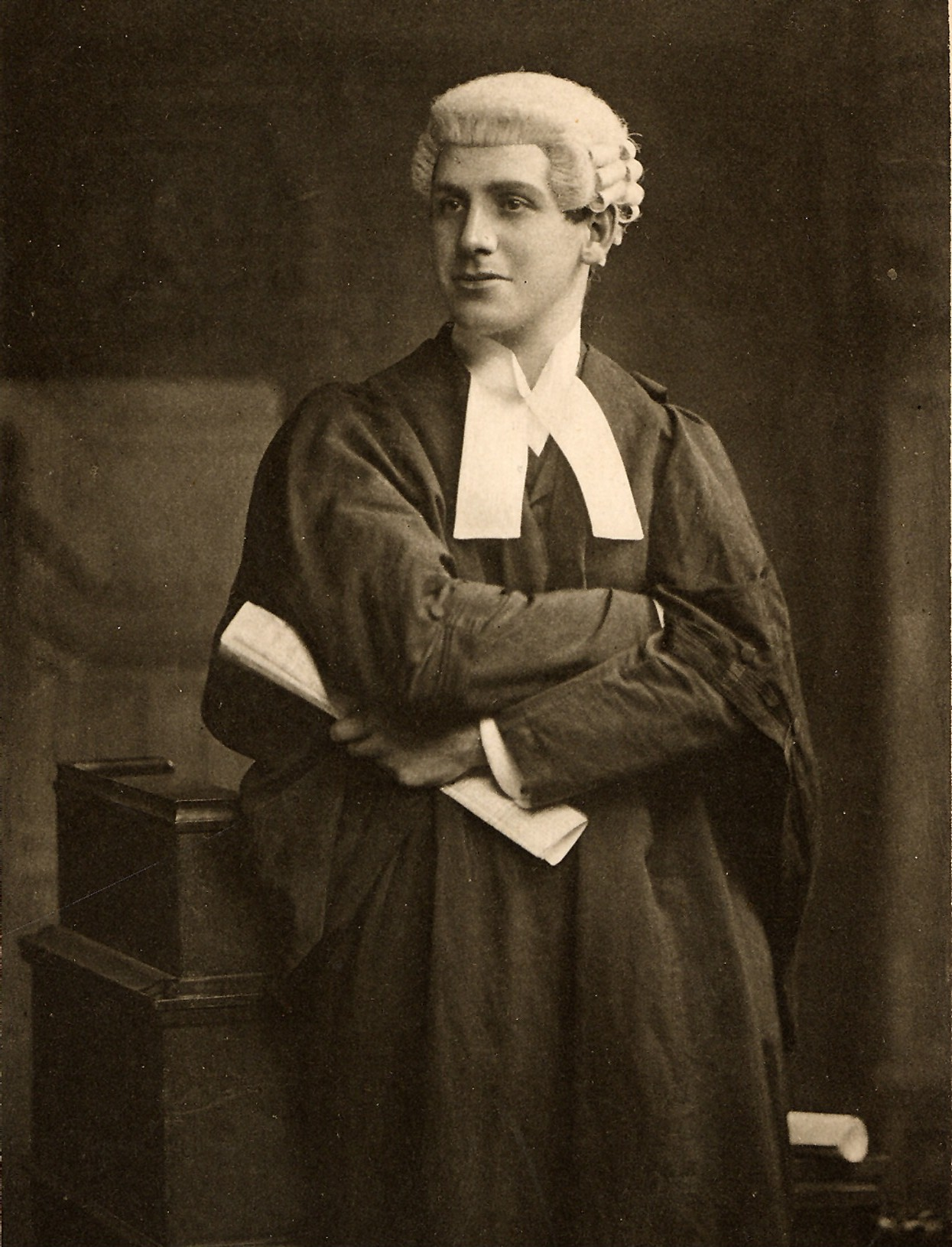
Tom Kettle, former Auditor of the Literary and Historical Society

As of 2022, UCD had more than seventy student societies, including large-scale party societies such as Ag Soc, Arts Soc, Commerce and Economics Society, ISS (and its subgroup AfricaSoc), INDSoc (Indian Society) and MSoc (Malaysian Society) who have the largest student communities of Indian and Malaysian students in Ireland. There are also religiously interested groups such as the Christian Union, the Islamic Society, the Atheist and Secular Society, a television station Campus Television Network, academic-oriented societies like the Economic Society, UCD Philosophy Society, Mathsoc, Classical Society, and An Cumann Gaelach, an Irish-language society and such charities as St. Vincent de Paul, UCDSVP. There are two main societies for international students, ESN UCD (part of the Erasmus Student Network) and the International Student's Society. The UCD Dramsoc is the university's drama society.

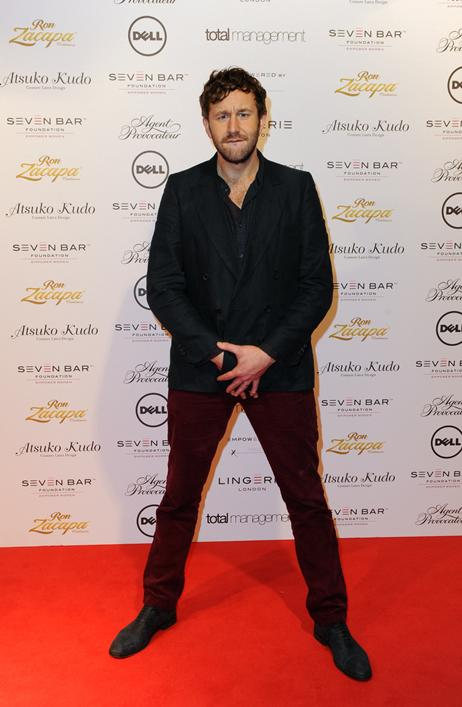
Chris O'Dowd former member of UCD Dramsoc

The oldest societies include the Literary and Historical Society (known as the L&H and which dates itself to 1855), the Commerce & Economics Society (in its 110th session as of 2022), and the Law Society (founded in 1911). At the start of the 2012/13 Academic Year, the L&H had a membership of 5,143 becoming the largest student society in UCD and in Europe.

The Commerce & Economics Society, which describes itself as "Ireland's largest and oldest business orientated university society", was originally a debating society. By 1999 it was, according to an article in the Irish Times, the "largest college society in UCD, Ireland and the British Isles". The society runs a number of events, including the formal black-tie 'Comm Ball', as well as mock interviews and networking events. Its notable former auditors and members include ex-Taoisigh Charles Haughey and Garret FitzGerald.

In competitive debating, the L&H and Law Society have represented the college several times, with the L&H securing 11 team wins and 12 individual wins in the Irish Times Debate and the Law Society achieving 2 team wins and 2 individual wins. The two societies have also been successful at the UK and Ireland John Smith Memorial Mace (formerly The Observer Mace) with the L&H winning 5 titles and Law Society 2 titles. UCD has hosted the World University Debating Championships twice, including the 2006 event.

A number of UCD societies engage in voluntary work on-campus and across Dublin. For example, the UCD Student Legal Service is a student-run society that provides free legal information clinics to the students of UCD.

Irish political parties are also represented on campus, with chapters of Ógra Fianna Fáil, Young Fine Gael, Ógra Shinn Féin, the Young Greens, People Before Profit and Labour Youth. UCD's "flagship instrumental ensemble", the University College Dublin Symphony Orchestra, was celebrating its 20th anniversary season as of 2022/2023.

=== Student publications and media ===
==== Newspapers ====
UCD has two student newspapers currently published on campus, the broadsheet University Observer and the tabloid College Tribune

===== The University Observer =====
The University Observer has won several awards, including five "newspaper of the year" awards at Ireland's National Student Media Awards. Founded in 1994, its first editors were Pat Leahy and comedian Dara Ó Briain. Several figures in Irish journalism have held the position of editor including The Irish Times political editor Pat Leahy, RTÉ News reporter Samantha Libreri, and Virgin Media News political correspondent Gavan Reilly. In 2001, in addition to several Irish National Student Media Awards, the University Observer took the runner up prize for "Best Publication" at the Guardian Student Media Awards in London.

The main sections within the paper are campus, national and international news, comment, opinion and sport. Each issue is also accompanied by an arts and culture supplement called O-Two, with music interviews, travel, fashion and colour pieces.

===== College Tribune =====
The College Tribune was founded in 1989, with the assistance of political commentator Vincent Browne. Then an evening student at UCD, Browne noted the lack of an independent media outlet for students and staff and set about establishing a student newspaper. The paper was initially established with links to the Sunday Tribune, though over time these links faded and ultimately, the Tribune would outlast its national counterpart. The paper supports itself financially through commercial advertising in its print edition, and maintains editorial independence from both university authorities and the Students' Union. The Tribune has been recognised on a number of occasions at the National Student Media Awards, and won Student Newspaper of the Year at the 1996 USI & Irish Independent Media Awards.

College Tribune sections include news, sport, features, arts, film and entertainment, music, fashion, business, and politics & innovation. It also has an arts culture supplement, The Trib, and a satirical 'paper within a paper', The Evil Gerald.

==== Radio and television ====
UCD also has a student radio station, Belfield FM, broadcasting throughout the academic year online on the station's website. The station is independently run by the UCD Broadcasting Society and has produced well known Irish radio presenters such as Ryan Tubridy and Rick O'Shea (of RTÉ fame) and Barry Dunne of 98FM. Belfield FM is the successor to UCD FM, which was operated within the entertainment office of the students' union as a service for students. Initially launched in 1992, the station rebranded in 2000 and has operated since then under the current name. As a result of the implementation of the students' union's new constitution at the beginning of the 2012 / 2013 academic year, the station now operates as a student society.

=== UCD scarf colours ===
In later years, students have been given a scarf of St Patrick's blue, navy and saffron at the President's Welcome Ceremony when they are officially welcomed. These colours have replaced "Faculty" colours and are now worn at graduation also.

== Notable people ==
=== Presidents ===
- William Delany SJ (1883–1888 and 1897–1909)
- Robert Carbery SJ (1888–1897)
- Denis Coffey, Dean of Medicine (1910–1940)
- Arthur W. Conway (1940–1947)
- Michael Tierney (1947–1964)
- Jeremiah Hogan (1964–1972)
- Thomas Murphy (1972–1985)
- Patrick Masterson (1986–1993)
- Art Cosgrove (1993–2003)
- Hugh R. Brady (2004–2013)
- Andrew J. Deeks (2014–2022)
- Mark Rogers (acting president 2022)
- Orla Feely (2023–present)

=== Alumni ===
Notable alumni and faculty of UCD include five Nobel laureates, four Taoisigh of Ireland, three Irish Presidents, and one President of India. The university has produced 49 judges of the Supreme Court of Ireland, 29 Rhodes Scholars, 3 Pulitzer Prize winners, and 3 Pritzker Prize recipients. Additionally, UCD is associated with writers such as James Joyce, William Butler Yeats, and Gerard Manley Hopkins; physicist Dennis Jennings; Golden Globe Award recipients Carroll O'Connor and Gabriel Byrne; Academy Award winner Neil Jordan; one of the co-developers of the Oxford–AstraZeneca COVID-19 vaccine Teresa Lambe; and many CEOs, including those of Unilever, Aer Lingus, Mediahuis Ireland, Chevron Corporation, and BP.

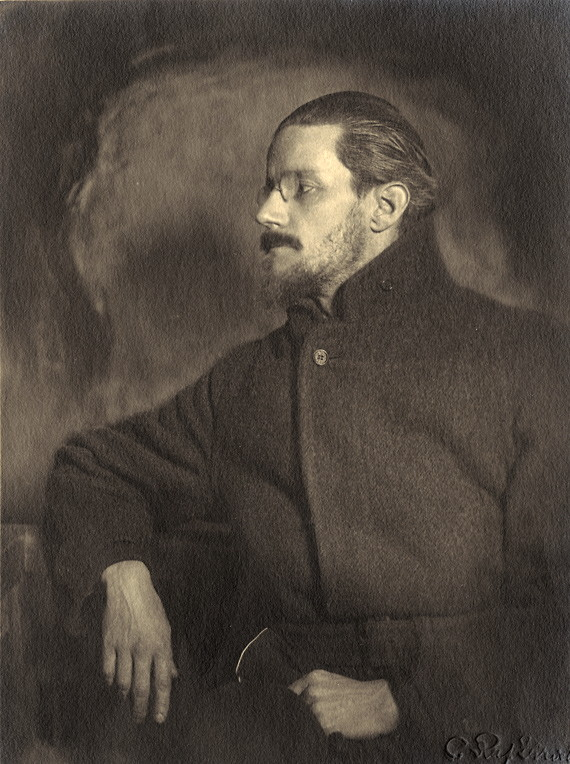
James Joyce 1903, writer

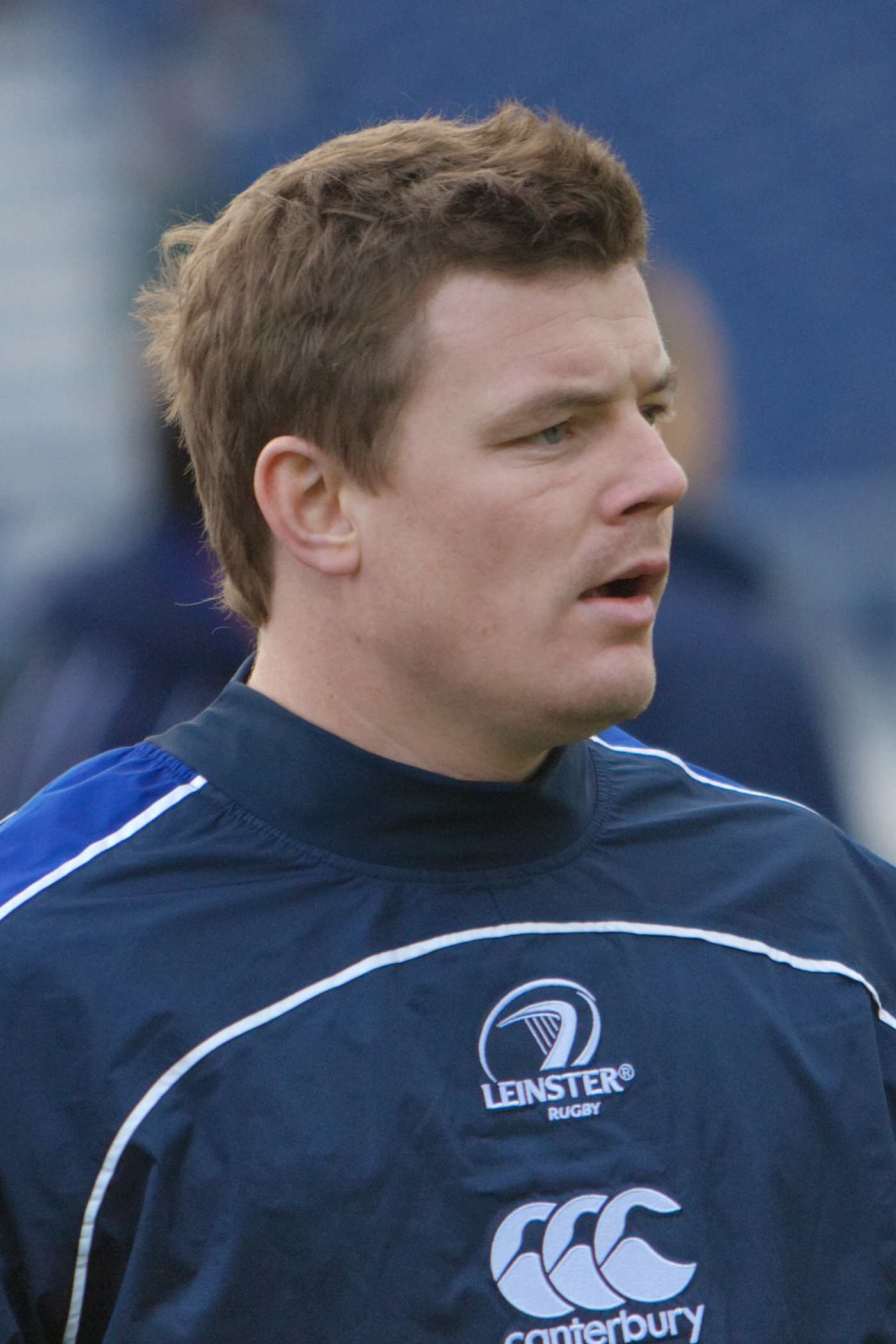
Brian O'Driscoll 2001, rugby player

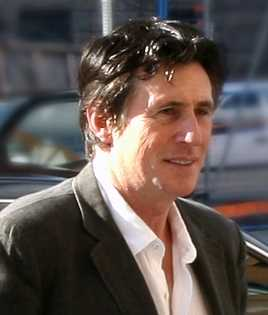
Gabriel Byrne, actor

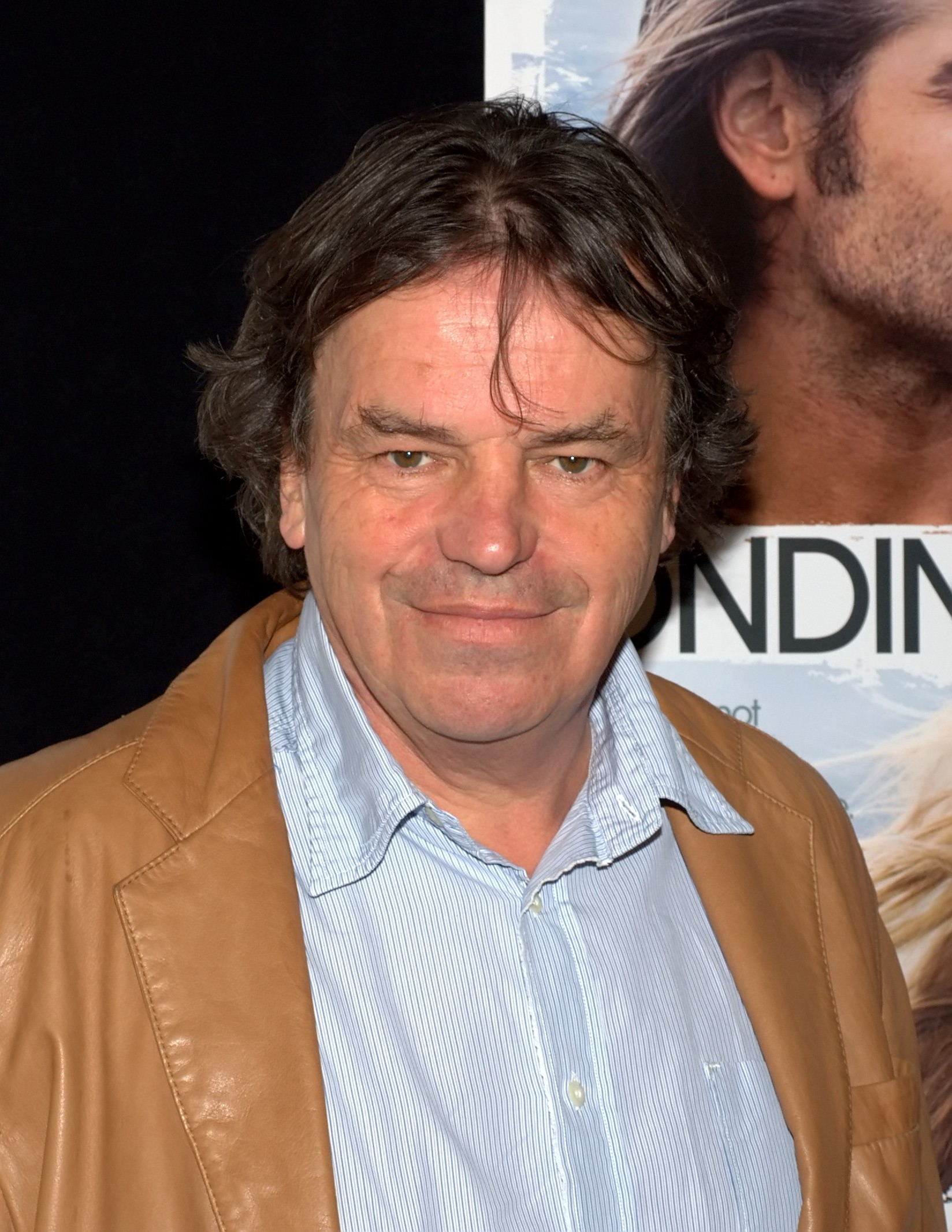
Neil Jordan, Oscar-winning film director and producer

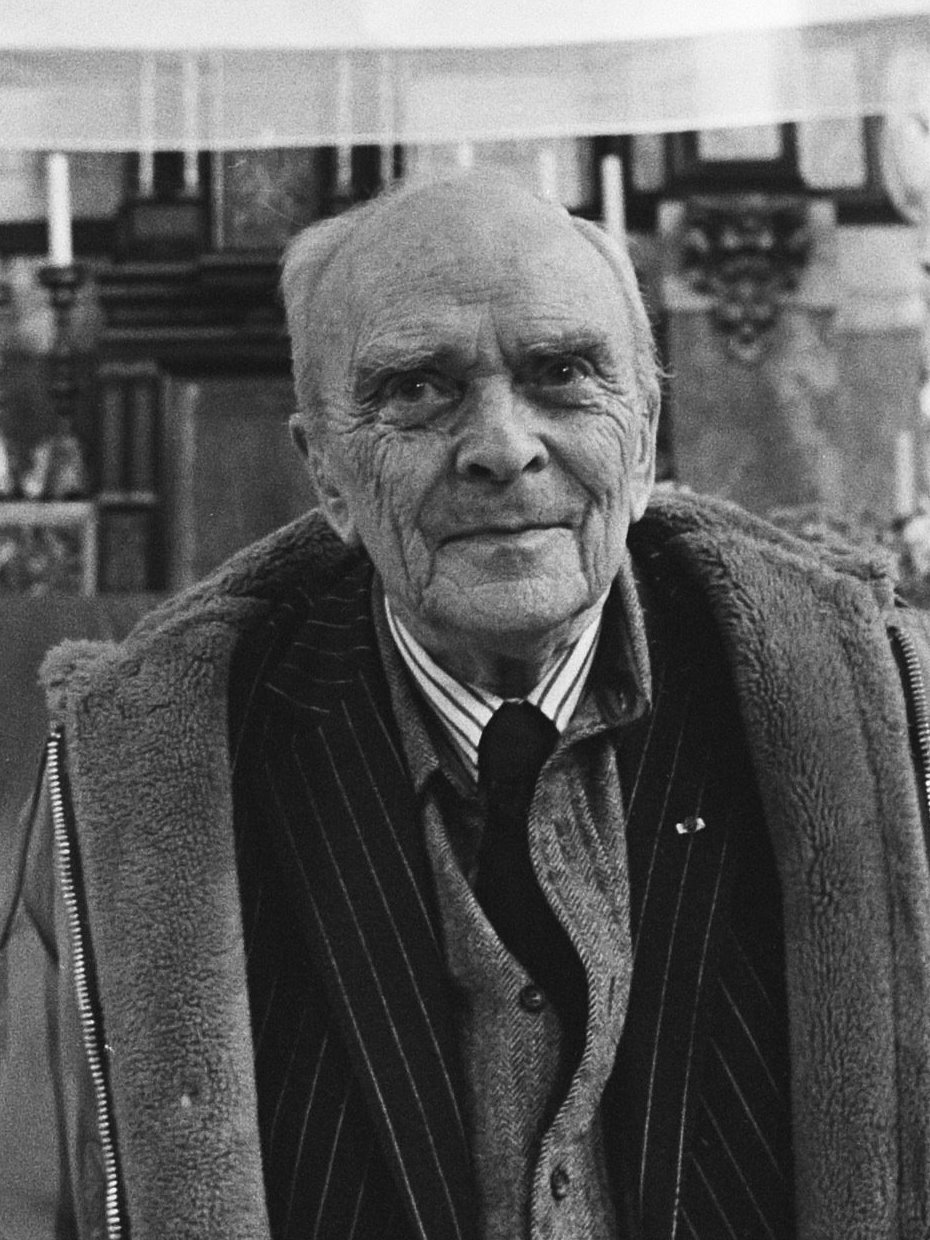
Seán MacBride, recipient of the Nobel Peace Prize 1974

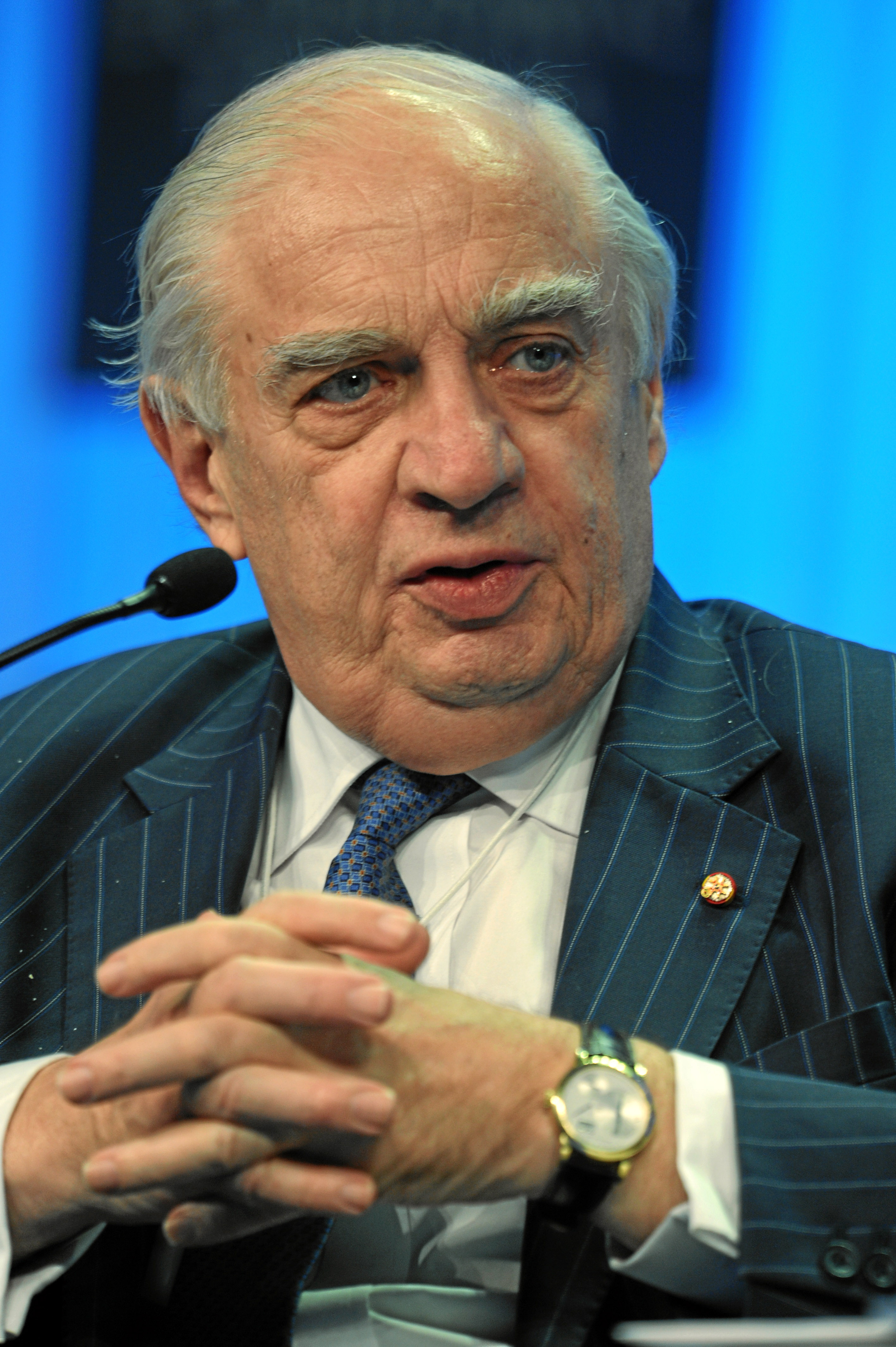
Peter Sutherland, first Director-General of the World Trade Organization

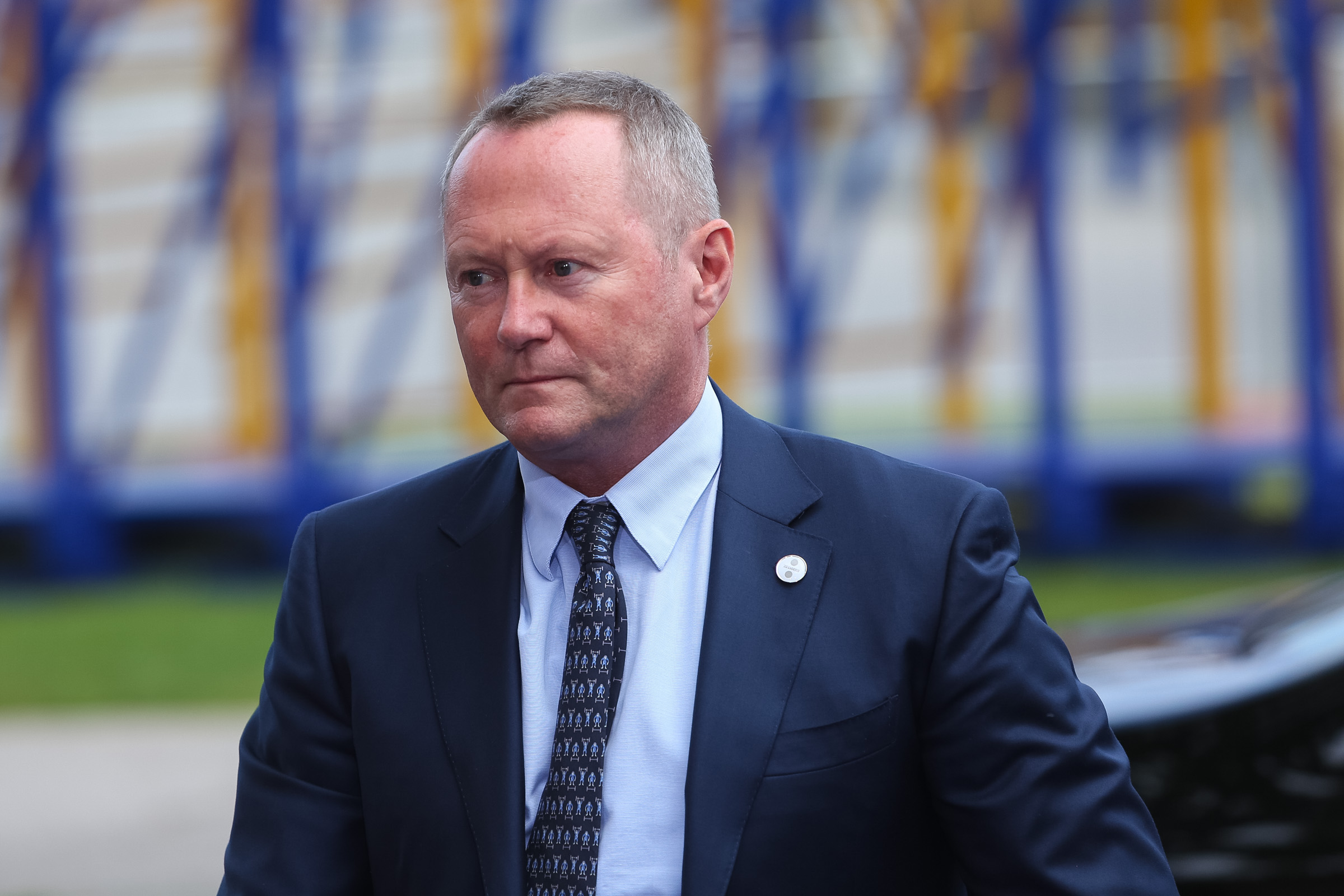
Michael O'Flaherty, Council of Europe Commissioner for Human Rights

==== Former presidents of Ireland ====
- Douglas Hyde (faculty)
- Cearbhall Ó Dálaigh
- Patrick Hillery

==== Former Taoisigh (Prime Ministers) of Ireland ====
- John A. Costello
- Charles Haughey
- Garret FitzGerald
- John Bruton
- Brian Cowen

==== Contemporary politicians and current members of Cabinet ====
- Richard Bruton
- Stephen Donnelly
- Charles Flanagan
- Seán Fleming
- Emer Higgins
- John McGahon
- Mairead McGuinness, European Commissioner for Financial Stability, Financial Services and
  the Capital Markets Union
- Charlie McConalogue
- Paul Murphy
- Cian O'Callaghan
- Jim O'Callaghan
- Éamon Ó Cuív
- Anne Rabbitte
- Eamon Ryan
- Neale Richmond
- Róisín Shortall
- Brendan Smith
- Eóin Tennyson
- Barry Ward

==== International affairs ====
In International affairs UCD's alumni include:

- Anne Anderson, first female Ambassador of Ireland to the US, UN, EU, France and Monaco
- H.E. Mako Komuro, Princess of Japan
- Catherine Day, former Secretary-General of the European Commission, the first woman to hold the position
- Dermot Gallagher, Secretary-General of the Department of Foreign Affairs, and Ambassador of Ireland to the USA
- Mahon Hayes, lawyer, diplomat and the only Irish person to serve on the International Law Commission
- Seán MacBride, one of the founders of Amnesty International and recipient of the 1974 Nobel Peace Prize.
- Emily O'Reilly, European Ombudsman elected by the European Parliament.
- Peter Sutherland, one of the major negotiators in the foundation of the World Trade Organization, and its first Director-General
- V. V. Giri the fourth President of India
- Ryan Crocker, a Career Ambassador within the United States Foreign Service, recipient of the Presidential Medal of Freedom.
- James Dooge (alumnus and faculty), chairman of the "Dooge Report" which led to the Single European Act and the Treaty of Maastricht

Seven of Ireland's former European Commissioners are alumni.

Irish revolutionaries Pádraig Pearse and Thomas MacDonagh, two of the leaders of the Easter Rising and signatories of the Proclamation of the Irish Republic were, respectively, a student and member of faculty at the university. As well as former president Douglas Hyde and Pádraig Pearse, UCD Professor Eóin MacNeill had a key role in the Gaelic revival in Ireland.

Since the foundation of the Irish state in 1922, UCD has produced the largest number of Justices of the Supreme Court of Ireland, the largest number of Chief Justices and the largest number of Attorneys General of Ireland of any Irish institution of higher education. Alumna Síofra O'Leary is Judge at the European Court of Human Rights and three of the six current justices of the Supreme Court are UCD alumni.

==== Healthcare ====
In 2008, Tony Holohan was appointed Chief Medical Officer for Ireland.

In 2010, UCD School of Medicine graduate and cardiothoracic surgeon Eilis McGovern was elected 168th President of the Royal College of Surgeons in Ireland and thereby became the first female President of any surgical Royal College in the world.

==== Writers and artists ====
Notable writers include James Joyce, Kate O'Brien, Austin Clarke, Benedict Kiely, Pearse Hutchinson, Thomas Kinsella, John Jordan, John McGahern, Paul Lynch and Hugh McFadden. Dee Forbes, Director General RTÉ and Miriam O'Callaghan, presenter of RTÉ's leading current affairs show, Prime Time, are alumni, as are comedians Dermot Morgan (1952–1998) and Dara Ó Briain who were major figures in the university's debating scene for many years, and Foil Arms and Hog who met at the Drama Society (Dramsoc). American actor Carroll O'Connor also studied there.

==== Sport ====
UCD has produced a number of notable athletes, including in field sports such as Gaelic games and rugby union. Many played within the university's club sides such as Brian O'Driscoll who played for University College Dublin R.F.C. The club has produced numerous British and Irish Lions including O'Driscoll, with several others attending as students. Notable GAA athletes include Rena Buckley, one of the most decorated players in GAA history, having won a total of 17 All-Ireland senior medals; Seán Murphy, a medical school graduate and member of the Gaelic Football Team of the Millennium; and Nicky Rackard, included in the Hurling Team of the Century. Dr. George Sigerson, namesake of the Sigerson Cup, donated his UCD salary to fund the trophy for the competition. Kevin Moran, formerly a Gaelic football but also a soccer player for Manchester United, graduated with a Bachelor of Commerce in 1976. Alumni include Ireland's fastest man Israel Olatunde.

==== Business ====
Alumni involved in business include:

- David J. O'Reilly, formerly CEO and chairman of the Chevron Corporation
- Niall FitzGerald, former CEO and chairman of Unilever
- Pearse Lyons (1944–2018), founder and President of Alltech
- Tony O'Reilly, who previously served as the CEO of H. J. Heinz Company as well as owning Independent News & Media
- Denis O'Brien, founder of Digicel
- Alison Darcy, research psychologist and founder of Woebot Health

==== Religious figures ====
A number of catholic religious figures studied or played significant roles at UCD, including Cardinals Tomás Ó Fiaich and Desmond Connell, as well as the founding rector Cardinal Newman. Clerical students from Clonliffe College, All Hallows College, St. Joseph's, Blackrock (Vincentians), the Holy Ghost Fathers (Spiritans) in Blackrock College and Kimmage Manor, St. Mary's Priory (Dominicans) and the Jesuit Milltown Park (and Rathfarnham Castle) would have studied for degrees at UCD while studying theology in their seminaries, as theology prohibited by the Royal University and National University of Ireland until 1996.

- Bishop Michael J. Cleary B.A., C.S.Sp., arts graduate, Bishop of Banjul, Gambia.
- Cardinal Desmond Connell, former Archbishop of Dublin, graduate and professor in UCD, and Dean of the Faculty of Philosophy and Sociology
- Bishop James Corboy SJ, First Roman Catholic Bishop of Monze, Zambia (1962–1992), Rector of Milltown (1959–1962)
- Bishop Robert Patrick Ellison B.Sc. C.S.Sp. Science graduate, Bishop of Banjul, Gambia.
- Rev. Prof. Thomas A. Finlay SJ, graduate of UCD, and Professor of Classics, Philosophy and Political Economy
- Fr. Aengus Finucane, missionary, one of the founders of Concern Worldwide
- Fr. John Fogarty, B.Sc., C.S.Sp., 24th Superior General of the Spiritans (2012–2021)
- Rev. Dr. Desmond Forristal, co-founder of Radharc films
- Fr. Francis Griffin C.S.Sp., first non-French Superior General of the Spiritans
- Fr. Michael Hurley SJ, co-founder of the Irish School of Ecumenics
- Bishop James Kavanagh, auxiliary bishop of Dublin, a graduate of UCD and Lecturer.
- Archbishop Ambrose Kelly C.S.Sp, served as Archbishop of Freetown and Bo, in Sierre Leone.
- Sr. Dr. Maura Lynch, catholic nun, doctor, women's rights advocate, in Angola and Uganda
- Archbishop James Leen B.A., C.S.Sp. (1888–1949), served as Bishop of Port Louis in Mauritius (1926–1949).
- Bishop Daniel Liston B.A., C.S.Sp., (1900–1986), served a Bishop of Port Louis in Mauritius (1949–1968).
- Archbishop Diarmuid Martin, Archbishop of Dublin
- Bishop John Joseph McCarthy B.A., C.S.Sp., Bishop of Nairobi, Kenya
- Fr. Peter McVerry SJ, founder of the Peter McVerry Trust is a science graduate from UCD.
- Archbishop John Charles McQuaid B.A., M.A., H.Dip.Ed., C.S.Sp., Archbishop of Dublin (1940–1972)
- Sr. Dr Mary Aquinas Monaghan, Columban missionary in China and Hong Kong, a specialist in the treatment and management of tuberculosis.
- Sr. Dr. Lucy O'Brien, missionary nun and medical doctor in Africa.
- Rev. Prof. E. F. O'Doherty, experimental psychologist, professor of psychology, and registrar of UCD.
- Cardinal Tomás Ó Fiaich, Archbishop of Armagh.
- Cardinal Maurice Piat CSSp, GCSK, Archbishop of Port Louis, Mauritius
- Archbishop Dermot Ryan, Archbishop of Dublin, UCD Professor of Oriental Languages
- Sr. Dr. Mona Tyndall, medical doctor and missionary nun in Nigeria and Zambia

Amongst the number of humanitarians to attend are John O'Shea founder of GOAL and Tom Arnold the CEO of Concern Worldwide.

Former faculty include Dennis Jennings of the School of Computing, considered to be an Internet pioneer for his leadership of NSFNET, the network that became the Internet backbone. Other notable faculty include Patrick Lynch, logician and philosopher Jan Łukasiewicz, Professor of Science and Society James Heckman who won the Nobel Memorial Prize in Economic Sciences in 2000, and geotechnical engineer Éamon Hanrahan.

== In popular culture ==
=== In literature ===
James Joyce's novel A Portrait of the Artist as a Young Man is partially set in UCD (when it was sited on Earlsfort Terrace) where Stephen Dedalus (now the name of the IT building) is enrolled as a student. Joyce's posthumously published autobiographical novel Stephen Hero contains stories of his time in UCD. Flann O'Brien's novel At Swim-Two-Birds features a UCD student who writes a meta-novel wherein the author is put on trial by the characters of his novel. Maeve Binchy's novel, Circle of Friends, deals with three female friends starting college in UCD in the 1950s. However, shots of Trinity College were used in the 1995 film. The second Ross O'Carroll-Kelly novel, The Teenage Dirtbag Years, follows the titular character as he enters UCD.

=== In music and film ===
Christy Moore wrote a tongue in cheek song about UCD's Literary and Historical Society called "The Auditor of the L and H".

In Boston Legal, Season 2, Episode 21 "Word Salad Day", there is a reference to a fictional study from University College Dublin that "found that the effects of divorce on children are far more damaging than the death of a parent".

Conor McPherson's third film Saltwater was filmed in Belfield, UCD.

== See also ==
- Education in the Republic of Ireland
- List of universities in the Republic of Ireland
- Irish studies
