= Matthew Russell (priest) =

Irish Jesuit priest, poet and editor (1834–1912)

Matthew Russell, photograph c.1890

Matthew Russell SJ (1834–1912) was an Irish Jesuit, known as a writer, poet and editor.

== Life ==
He was born at Ballybot, County Down, into a Catholic family, the son of Arthur Russell and his wife Margaret Hamill, née Mullan; he was the brother of Charles Russell, Baron Russell of Killowen and nephew of Charles William Russell. After education at Castleknock College and time as a seminarian at St Patrick's College, Maynooth, he joined the Society of Jesus in 1857.

Ordained priest in 1864, Russell then taught at Crescent College, outside Limerick, to 1873. From 1873 he was in Dublin, from 1877 a priest at Saint Francis Xavier Church.

== The Irish Monthly ==
The Irish Monthly was founded by Russell in 1873. The initial title was Catholic Ireland. The magazine in this form was founded by Russell with Thomas Aloysius Finlay. Finlay taught at Crescent College from 1873 to 1876, and was co-editor with Russell at the outset.

A memoir of Russell by Rosa Mulholland (as Lady Gilbert) records a conversation of Richard O'Kennedy with him, around 1871, in which the phrase "Catholic Ireland" and a religious periodical were linked. Russell's conception was tied up with the Catholic devotion of the Sacred Heart. Around 1864 he had been interested in the Messenger of the Sacred Heart and had contacted the editor of its English version, William Meagher (or Maher, another anglicisation of Ó Meachair, 1823–1877). In the first issue (July 1873) it was made clear the importance laid on 30 March 1873, when a consecration of Ireland to the Sacred Heart was performed. Russell renewed contact with Meagher, asking for permission to launch an Irish version of the Messenger, but was rebuffed. He continued under the Catholic Ireland title, with the support of the Jesuit Provincial Nicholas Walsh.

Declan O'Keeffe considers that the contributions received dictated a change in editorial policy away from the devotional. The change of title to Irish Monthly has been attributed to persuasion from friends and supporters, who included Lady Monteagle, daughter of the Protestant bishop Samuel Butcher. It occurred in 1875.

From 1875 Russell had some editorial assistance given by Edmund Joseph O'Reilly. Staples of the magazine were novelists such as Margaret Brew and M. E. Francis in serial publication. An example from 1875–6 was The Chances of War, Finlay's novel on Owen Roe O'Neill, under the pseudonym Thomas Whitelock.

== Irish Literary Revival ==
William Delany, a friend of Russell's, noted the work he did in bringing young writers to notice. Katharine Tynan considered he provided a unique literary focal point in Dublin.

== Works ==
- Emmanuel: a book of eucharistic verses (1878)
- The Idylls of Killowen: a Soggorth's Secular Verses (1898)
