= Edmund O'Reilly =

Edmund O'Reilly may refer to:

- Edmund O'Reilly (bishop) (1616–1669), Roman Catholic Archbishop of Armagh
- Edmund O'Reilly (theologian) (1811–1878), Catholic theologian
