= Robert Carbery =

Robert Carbery SJ (1829–1903) was an Irish Jesuit priest, who served as Rector of Clongowes Wood College, and President of University College Dublin. Born in Youghal, County Cork in 1829. He studied for a time at Trinity College, Dublin, then at Clongowes Wood College, before going to St. Patrick's College, Maynooth to study for the priesthood for the Diocese of Cloyne, where he was ordained. He then joined the Jesuits in 1854, St Acuil, Amiens in France. He taught for some twelve years at the Jesuit St Stanislaus College, Tullabeg, Co. Offaly, he taught at Clongowes, and served as Master of Novices in Milltown Park. While in Miltown he befriended the writer William Carleton although a convert to Anglicanism, Fr Carbery offered him the last rites, which Carleton politely refused. Fr Carbery was appointed Rector of Clongowes in 1870 serving until 1876. He succeeded William Delany SJ as President of University College Dublin, in 1888 and was also succeeded by Fr Delany in 1897.

Fr Carbery died in Milltown Park, on September 3, 1903.

Academic offices
Preceded by William Delany SJ	President of the University College Dublin; 1888–1897	Succeeded by William Delany SJ
