= Bartholomew Esmonde =

Bartholomew Esmonde (1789–1862) was an Irish Jesuit priest, educator, and amateur architect. He was responsible for the design of Saint Francis Xavier Church, Dublin. He briefly served as superior to the Irish Society of Jesus in 1820.

== Life ==
Bartholomew Esmonde was born on 12 December 1789, the second son of John Esmonde and Helen (née O'Callan) of Sallins, County Kildare. His father John Esmonde (of the Esmonde baronets family, of Ballynastragh, County Wexford) was executed by hanging, following his role in the United Irishmen, 1798 Rebellion in Prosperous, County Kildare. His older brother was Sir Thomas Esmonde, 9th Baronet, MP for Wexford. He was educated at the Jesuit novitiate at Stonyhurst College, England and studied philosophy and theology in Palermo, Italy.

In conjunction with two of his brethren, Paul Ferley and Charles Aylmer, he compiled A short Explanation of the Principal Articles of the Catholic Faith, and The Devout Christian's Daily Companion, being a Selection of Pious Exercises for the use of Catholics.

Esmonde returned to Ireland as Master of Novices at Clongowes Wood College and later served as Rector of Clongowes. He lived in Rome from 1842, where he did much of the design of the Gardiner St. church, and then Malta, returning to Ireland in 1850.

Esmonde died on 15 December 1862. A portrait of him is in the Jesuits building in Gardner Street, also a monument to him in St. Michaels Church, Gorey, both commissioned and gifted by his brother, Sir Thomas Esmonde.
