= Thomas A. Finlay =

Thomas Aloysius Finlay, S.J. (1848 – 1940) was an Irishman who was a Catholic priest, an economist, a philosopher and an editor.

== Early life ==
He was born on 6 July 1848 near Lanesborough, the son of William Finlay, an engineer, and his wife Maria Magan; the politician Thomas Finlay, named after him, was his nephew. His father, who died in 1864, was from Fifeshire, a Protestant convert to Catholicism; his mother was a Catholic from County Cavan.

Finlay was educated at St Augustine's College, Cavan, and became a novice of the Society of Jesus in 1866, at the Jesuit theological faculty, Milltown Park, Dublin. He took vows in 1868. He then spent time in Saint-Acheul, France, the Gregorian University, Rome. Moved on because of capture of Rome of the Risorgimento, he was sent to Maria Laach Abbey, in Germany. There he encountered Prussian agricultural methods and the Raiffeisenbank system; and gained an interest in biology from colleagues. He returned to Ireland in 1873.

From 1873 to 1876, Finlay taught at Crescent College, Limerick. He founded and edited the magazine Catholic Ireland, with Matthew Russell, later the Irish Monthly. In 1877 he was moved to St Beuno's College in Wales, where he was noted for "direct speech and rough clothes". He overlapped there with Gerard Manley Hopkins, whom he knew better from 1884, when Hopkins was a fellow of the Royal University of Ireland and had a post at University College, Dublin. At St Beuno's Finlay started The Lyceum, the college magazine, in the year he arrived, but could not induce Hopkins to contribute.

Finlay in 1880 was ordained priest, and in 1881 he was made head of St Stanislaus College in Tullabeg, replacing William Delany.

== Dublin ==
Amid reorganisation of the Catholic colleges in Dublin, Finlay moved on to University College, Dublin (formerly the Catholic University), then under Henry Neville. In 1883, under Delany from December, he became joint professor at University, with his brother Peter, of mental and moral science. He was also made rector of Belvedere College in north Dublin. He was auditor of the Literary and Historical Society (University College Dublin) in 1883–1884; and, in turn, professor of classics, of philosophy, and of political economy at University College, from 1903 to 1930.

With Horace Plunkett he helped found the Irish Agricultural Organisation Society, and was a member of the 1895 Recess Committee which led to the establishment of the Department of Agriculture and Technical Instruction for Ireland. He was a Commissioner of National Education, chaired the Committee on Intermediate Education, and was chairman of the trustees of the National Library. He was president of the Statistical and Social Inquiry Society of Ireland between 1911 and 1913.

Finlay was involved as founder and editor of a second magazine called The Lyceum (1889–1994), and with the New Ireland Review and its successor Studies: An Irish Quarterly Review. He founded The Irish Homestead for the co-operative movement, in 1896, and edited it to 1905. He also helped found the Irish Messenger of the Sacred Heart.

== Sources ==
- Thomas J. Morrissey, SJ Thomas A. Finlay SJ, 1848–1940, Educationalist, editor, social reformer. Four Courts Press, Dublin, 2004. ISBN 1-85182-827-3
