= Edward Coyne (priest) =

Irish college founder (1896–1958)

Edward Joseph Coyne
- Born: 20 June 1896
- Died: 20 June 1958 (aged 62)

Academic background
- Education: University College Dublin

Academic work
- Discipline: Sociology
- Sub-discipline: Economics
- Institutions: Jesuit College; National College of Ireland

Fr. Edward (Ned) Joseph Coyne S.J. (1896–1958) was a Jesuit priest, economist and sociologist. He founded the Catholic Workers' College (which became the College of Industrial Relations and National College of Ireland) in Milltown, Dublin, and served as its principal from 1951 to 1954.

Edward Coyne was born in Dublin on 20 June 1896, and educated at Clongowes Wood College and University College Dublin, where he studied History and Economics, gaining a first in both subjects.

Coyne served as Professor of Moral Theology at the Jesuit College in Milltown.

While formulating the 1937 Irish Constitution, Éamon de Valera was advised by Fr Coyne among others.

He served on a number of Government commissions and other organisations. He was Chairman of the Irish Agricultural Organisation Society.

Fr. Coyne died on 22 May 1958.
