= Carmelite Institute of Britain and Ireland =

Catholic university initiative

The Carmelite Institute of Britain and Ireland
- Type: Online Theology Programmes
- Established: 2005
- Religious affiliation: Catholic (Carmelite)
- Academic affiliations: Milltown Institute of Theology and Philosophy (2005–15); York St John University (2012–16); St. Patrick's College, Maynooth (2015–present)
- Director: Dr. Patrick Mullins OCarm
- Location: Dublin, Leinster, Ireland; 53.2806°N 6.2405°W
- Website: www.cibi.ie
- Location in Dublin

The Carmelite Institute of Britain and Ireland (CIBI) is a Catholic university initiative by the Carmelite Irish and British province and the Anglo-Irish Province of Discalced Carmelites, as founded in December 2005, which provides distance learning/online courses at undergraduate and postgraduate level in Carmelite Theology.

In its initial year 90 students commenced their study on the initial two programmes (a Certificate in Spirituality and a Diploma in Spirituality), and in October of 2009 the first graduation of students took place at the Milltown Institute in Dublin, Ireland. From its foundation CIBI programmes were accredited by the Milltown Institute of Theology and Philosophy until its closure in 2015; subsequently the CIBI programmes have been validated by St. Patrick's Pontifical University, Maynooth, which also approved the CIBI's Master of Theology in Carmelite Studies and Bachelor of Theology in Carmelite Studies programmes upon their respective launches in 2012 and 2016. The Master of Theology programme had initially been validated by York St John University in England, since the Milltown Institute was in the process of winding down and had no longer been in a position to validate new programmes.

The Carmelite Institute of Britain and Ireland offers, since January 2019, 53 undergraduate courses and 12 postgraduate modules (including a dissertation preparation module for students planning on undertaking the composition of a dissertation) have been formally approved for accreditation by St. Patrick Pontifical University, Maynooth. A number of short formative courses of a less academically rigorous nature are also offered by the CIBI, covering subjects ranging from an overview of major 20th century figures of the Carmelite order to an initial formation course "designed to complement the Initial Formation of candidates wishing to embark upon a religious life in Carmel".

In addition to the school's native Ireland and the UK, graduates have hailed from Australia, Brazil, Canada, Malaysia, Norway, and the United States.

CIBI courses validated by Maynooth are eligible for tax relief.

Courses are offered via Moodle. There are no extracurricular clubs or activities for enrolled students.

== Carmelite Centre, Gort Mhuire ==
The CIBI is situated at the Carmelite Centre, Gort Mhuire, Ballinteer, Co. Dublin, Ireland. Gort Mhuire, is the residence of the Prior Provincial of the Irish Carmelites, and in addition to the order's Novitiate it houses the provincial archive and library. From 1949, Gort Mhuire was the novitiate for the order and the theologate for the Carmelites, since students were unable to travel to Rome during the Second World War. In 1968 Carmelites began studying theology in Milltown Park as the Milltown Institute was being set up there. Gort Mhuire contains an extensive library (reconstituted in 2006) on Carmelite studies, theology, spirituality and Mariology, and, in addition to affiliate partnership with the Carmelite Library, much of the material is available online.

== See also ==
- Carmelite Order
- St. Patrick's Pontifical University, Maynooth
