= Charles Aylmer =

Irish Jesuit priest

Charles Aylmer (29 August 1786 – 4 July 1847) was an Irish Jesuit.

== Biography ==
Aylmer was born at Painstown, Kilcock, County Kildare, on 29 August 1786. His father, also called Charles Aylmer, attended the Catholic Convention in 1792. He entered the Society of Jesus at Stonyhurst College, in Lancashire, and was created D.D. in 1814 while at Palermo, where he was stationed for several years. For the use of the British Catholics in that city he, in conjunction with two of his brethren, Paul Ferley and Bartholomew Esmonde, compiled A short Explanation of the Principal Articles of the Catholic Faith, and The Devout Christian's Daily Companion, being a Selection of Pious Exercises for the use of Catholics. He became rector of Clongowes Wood College, in Ireland, in 1817, was professed of the four vows 16 January 1820, and lived in Dublin from about 1821 until his death on 4 July 1847. He took out the lease on the lands from Maria O'Brien, for the establishment of Tullabeg College in 1818. He was superior of the Dublin Residence in 1816, 1822, and 1829 (when the first stone of the church in Gardiner Street was laid), and again in 1841. Father Aylmer promoted in Dublin a society for the printing of Catholic books. His brother was an officer of Austrian cuirassiers, and was considered one of the best swordsmen in that service.
