= Joseph Dalton (priest) =

Irish Roman Catholic priest (1817–1905)

Joseph Dalton (2 December 1817 – 4 January 1905) was an Irish Jesuit priest born in Waterford.

He was educated at the Jesuit colleges of Clongowes Wood College and St Stanislaus College, Tullabeg and entered the Society of Jesus in December 1836. He was ordained in 1850. He studied and served at various Jesuit institutions in Ireland and returned to Tullabeg where he had also taught in 1839–1840 and served as Rector from 1861–1865.

He led the first Irish Jesuit mission to Australia in 1866. He was responsible for the development of a number of churches and educational institutions. He oversaw the transfer of St Patrick's College, East Melbourne to the Jesuits and subsequently purchased land in 1872 upon which Xavier College, Kew, was built. It opened in 1878.

He also served in New Zealand for a time, where in 1878 he founded Saint Aloysius’ College, Dunedin.

In Sydney, he founded Saint Ignatius' College, Riverview & St Aloysius' College. He was Rector of Riverview, New South Wales. After his retirement in 1883 he lived at Riverview, where he died on 5 January 1905.

The Chapel of Riverview was later erected to his memory.

His younger brother James was also a Jesuit priest.
