= St Stanislaus College =

Ohio

Location
- Rahan, County Offaly; Ireland
- Coordinates: 53.28511°N 7.61194°W

Information
- Other name: College of Tullabeg, Tullamore; Tullabeg Jesuit College
- Type: Boarding School (1818–86), Novitiate (1888–1930); Philosophate (1930–62).
- Religious affiliation: Roman Catholic (Jesuit)
- Established: 1818
- Closed: 1886
- Gender: Male

St Stanislaus College (often called Tullabeg College) was a Jesuit boys boarding school, novitiate and philosophy school, in Tullabeg, Rahan, County Offaly. St Carthage founded a monastery of 800 monks there in 595 before founding his monastery in Lismore. The Presentation Sisters also have a convent in Rahan, Killina, which was founded at the same time (circa 1818) as the Jesuits founded St Stanislaus College.

== Jesuits in Tullabeg ==
St Stanislaus College was founded as a boarding school for boys under the age of thirteen in 1818. It was endowed by the O'Briens, a local gentry family (Killina – also donated lands for presentation convent and school in Killina), and was intended to cater for upper middle class Catholics, as was the sister college at Clongowes Wood College where most of its pupils would graduate to. The lands were leased to Charles Aylmer from Maria O'Brien permanently.

In the 1850s, the school was enlarged to take older boys. Water polo was played at the school, the first pitch being laid under Delaney's rectorship and the facilities developed by Karl Wisthoff (1845–1937), a German Jesuit, were highly regarded; he also had the Grand Canal widened to allow rowing.

=== University Preparation ===
While William Delany was rector 1876, similar to Carlow College and St. Patrick's College, Thurles, students were able to be matriculated and examined by the University of London for BA degrees. Following the establishment of the Royal University of Ireland in 1882 pupils would progress to the Jesuit UCD, students from Tullabeg, it was noted, achieved high marks in examinations for the Royal University.

=== Closure of the School ===
In 1886, the school was closed and the boys were transferred to Clongowes. This may have been because of a shortage of priests, as the Jesuit House in Dromore, County Down closed the same year and Mungret College in Limerick had just been established.

=== Jesuits Novitate ===
St. Stanislaus College was sometimes titled Domus Probationis et Studiorum Tulliolana (The House of Formation and Studies at Tullamore) by the Jesuits. In 1918, Tullabeg became a formation house for Jesuits novices, where it became affectionately known as "the Bog". Some Jesuits would serve their Tertianship in Tullabeg, among its rectors, William Henry. In 1930 some 52 novices were transferred to the Jesuits in Emo Court, and Tullabeg catered for training Jesuits who had completed their university studies. In 1962 the philosophy school was transferred to Jesuit School of Philosophy in Milltown. It was subsequently a retreat house until shortly after Easter 1991, Brendan Murray was the last rector.

=== Rectors ===
- Robert St Ledger (1818–1831), first rector/superior came to Tullabeg with the aim to open a novitiate and a school.
- John Curtis (1834–1843), rector/superior
- Patrick Bracken (1843–1850)
- John Ffrench (1850–1855)
- Joseph Dalton (1861–1865) – a former student, teacher and rector of Tullabeg
- William Delany (1870–1880) – served as president of Catholic University of Ireland
- Aloysius Sturzo (1880–1883)
- George Kelly (1883–1886)
- John Colgan (1888–1890) – master of novices, novitiate established
- William Sutton (1890–1895) – became Rector of Milltown Park
- James Murphy
- Martin Maher
- William Henry (1919–1927)
- John C. Joy – Rector of the House of Philosophical Studies, Tullamore
- Hugh Kelly (19??-1940)
- Donal O'Sullivan (1940–1947) – rector of the philosophate at Tullabeg
- Michael Connolly (1947–1953)
- Brendan Lawlor (1953–1959), Professor of Cosmology and Biology (1940–1941 and 1953–1962)
- Joseph O’Mara (13 October 1959 – 9 August 1962)
- Kieran Hanley (1965–1972) – Superior of Tullabeg and Assistant in Parish.
- Brendan Murray (1986–1991) – last rector, ministered in parish.

== After the Jesuits ==
The public church was always well attended by congregations right up until it closed. The Novena to St Francis Xavier each Autumn and the Novena to The Sacred Heart in June drew very large crowds. Confessions were held every Saturday all day until the day it closed due to shortage of priests. The building and grounds remained closed for a while before being bought by a local builder and used as a nursing home and a 9-hole golf course. Since then, due to problems with an external investor, the nursing home was closed, and, for a while, the golf course remained, but it too closed a while after. During the time the premises was under administration, it was placed under the care of a British security company who failed to secure the property properly. As a result, it was plundered and vandalised with lead taken off the roof, et cetera. It was bought since by two people from the Midlands. The building is now boarded up but the 9-hole golf course did reopen but has since closed with a new club house and a coffee shop built. There was a restaurant and a bar named The College Bar with the bar and driving range remaining open as of March 2012.

Kevin A Laheen has written a detailed history of the college called the Jesuits in Tullabeg, either 3 or 4 volumes. The college, as it was known locally, was the spiritual heart of the area. Fr Hyde was a priest who lived in the college in the early to mid 1900s. He is said to have successfully prayed for the cure of several people and people still pray to him today.

The chapel at Tullabeg with its seven Evie Hone windows was one of the glories of Irish religious art of the twentieth century. They are now housed in the Jesuit Residence at Manresa House, Dublin. The altar was designed by the architect Michael Scott with carved altar front by Laurence Campbell. The altar is now in Mucklagh Catholic church.

== Cemetery ==
The Jesuit Cemetery is beside the rear avenue entrance on the clara side of Rahan. 42 Jesuits and one lay college worker are buried there. All remains were left there after the Jesuits departed. Headstones were removed at one stage making the exact location of burial places matching headstones marking them as being unreliable. There was a plaque erected for 8 Jesuits buried in the older Rahan graveyard before the establishment of the Jesuit Cemetery in 1874.

== Notable former pupils of the school ==
- Matthias McDonnell Bodkin, journalist and MP
- Sir William Francis Butler, lieutenant-general in the British Army, writer, and adventurer, he also served on the National University of Ireland Senate.
- James Laurence Carew, Nationalist MP
- Joseph Dalton – returned to Tullabeg as a teacher, and served as Rector (1861–65) before going to Australia, where he founded a number of Churches and Schools.
- Richard D'Alton Williams – Young Irelander, poet and contributor to the Nation.
- Michael Louis Hearn – Nationalist MP for South Dublin (1917–1918).
- Edmund Leamy, editor of United Ireland, the Parnel supporting Nationalist MP (Waterford City, Cork North East, South Sligo, and North Kildare)
- Jack Meldon, solicitor, Irish cricketer, TCD cricket champion and Irish billiards champion.
- Nicholas O'Cono (1843–1908), a British diplomat, served as Ambassador to Russia and Turkey.
- Sir Michael O'Dwyer, British colonial administrator and Governor in British India.
- Patrick James Smyth, Young Irelander, Nationalist MP, friend of John Mitchel.
- Thomas Joseph Tobin, barrister and cricketer for Leinster and Ireland.

== Notable Jesuits who trained at Tullabeg ==
- Francis Browne, spent two years as a novitiate in Tullabeg, famous for his photographs of the Titanic.
- Stephen Brown.
- Bishop James Corboy (1916–2004), S.J., who served as Bishop of Monze, Zambia. He also served as Rector of the Theology School at Milltown Park (1959–1962).
- Patrick G. Kennedy (1881–1966), Jesuit priest, naturalist, and ornithologist.
- Lambert McKenna, teacher, academic, social thinker, trained at tullabeg.
- Michael Morrison, entered Tullabeg in 1925, became a teacher and British army chaplain in the second world war at the liberation of Belsen.
- Albert Power (priest) (1870 – 1948), rector of Corpus Christi College, Melbourne, Australia.
- John Sullivan, commenced his novitiate in Tullabeg in 1900.
- Joseph Walshe, trained as a jesuit in tullabeg, left jesuits in 1915 became Secretary, Department of External Affairs, Irish Free State, 1923–1946

== People associated with the school ==
Others associated with Tullabeg include W. H. Grattan Flood who taught music there as well as at Clongowes. The Jesuit and poet Gerard Manley Hopkins is known to have visited Tullabeg, and stayed there on retreat in his final year, and his notes from this retreat are very negative and pessimistic. Thomas A. Finlay, a priest, writer, editor and economist, taught for a year at the college. Peter James Kenny who founded Clongowes was instrumental in the establishment of Tullabeg. William Sutton served as rector from 1890 to 1895. Theologian John J. O'Meara taught in Tullabeg. Others who spent time in Tullabeg include Fergal McGrath, Edward Coyne (founder of the Catholic Workers College/ National College of Industrial Relations) and historian Francis Shaw. The former confederate chaplain in the American civil war John Bannon ministered at Tullabeg in 1880, after he returned to Ireland and joined the Jesuits. Alfred Murphy served as Rector of Tullabeg. Donal O'Sullivan who was chairman of the Irish Arts Council was rector of the college in the 1940s, and commissioned works by Evie Hone.

== See also ==
- Clongowes Wood College, County Kildare, St. Stanislaus College, School merged with in 1886.
- St. Mary's Emo Court, County Laois, novices moved to in 1930.
- Milltown Park, Dublin, philosophy school moved to Tullabeg in 1930.
- Loyola House, Dromore, County Down, novices moved to Tullabeg in 1888.
- List of Jesuit sites in Ireland
- List of Jesuit schools
