= Sydney Bernard Smith =

Irish poet (1936–2008)

- Born: 4 August 1936; Glasgow, Scotland
- Died: 11 October 2008 (aged 72)
- Education: Clongowes Wood College, Queen's College, Oxford, University of Iowa
- Occupations: poet, dramatist, actor and novelist
- Notable work: see Publications
- Spouse: Cynthia (née Hoxie)
- Children: 3 sons, 1 daughter
- Awards: elected a member of Aosdana (1982)

Sydney Bernard Smith (4 August 1936 – 11 October 2008) was a Scots-Irish poet, dramatist, actor and novelist.

== Biography ==
He was born in Glasgow, his father was from Forfar, Angus and his mother from County Clare. He was brought up in Portstewart, County Londonderry in Northern Ireland.

He was educated at Clongowes Wood College, Queen's College, Oxford and the University of Iowa International Writer's programme. He later taught at Clongowes Wood College. He also worked as a teacher at Sandymount High School in Dublin, the University of Iowa and Ithaca College in Ithaca, New York. He also taught in Germany and Spain.

Smith was married to Cynthia (née Hoxie) and they had three sons (Daniel, Sydney George, Cormac) and a daughter (Emer). At the time of his death, he lived in Dundalk, County Louth in Ireland.

== Awards ==
- 1982 elected a member of Aosdana

== Publications ==
=== Poetry ===
- Girl With Violin (The Dolmen Press [Poetry Ireland Editions 3], Dublin 1968)
- Priorities (Raven Arts Press, Dublin 1979)
- Sensualities (Raven, 1981)
- Scurrilities (Raven 1981)
- New and Selected Poems (Raven, 1984).

=== Plays ===
- Sherca (1976, published Newark, Del, Proscenium Press, 1979)
- Don Bosco, Grainne and the Dole (1977)
- The Impertinence of being Frank (1978)
- The Illaunapsppie Triangle (1978)
- Houseparty (1979)
- Swim Away Babies (1984)
- On Course for Brazil (1985)
- How to Roast a Strasbourg Goose ( Dublin Theatre Festival, 1985)
- Up for Bloomsday (1985)
- The 2nd Grand Confabulation of Drum Ceat (Dublin Theatre Festival, Andrews Lane Theatre, 1989)
- Reason not the Need (1992)
- The Shaming of the True (1995).

=== Novels ===
- Flannery (Dublin, Odell & Adair, 1991)
- The Book of Shannow (published in literary magazines)

=== Other ===
His work was broadcast on RTÉ, BBC and Channel 4, and staged in Ireland; at the Edinburgh Festival Fringe; and in the United States.
