= Milltown Institute of Theology and Philosophy =

Jesuit seminary in Dublin, Ireland

- Former names: Miltown Park
- Type: Private
- Active: 1968–2015
- Religious affiliation: Jesuit
- Academic affiliations: NUI (2005–2015); HETAC (1989–2012); Pontifical Athenaeum (1968-2015)
- President: Rev Dr Thomas R Whelan CSSp (Rector)
- Location: Ranelagh, County Dublin, Ireland; 53°19′04″N 6°14′42″W
- Campus: Urban
- Website: www.milltown-institute.ie

The Milltown Institute of Theology and Philosophy was a Jesuit-run institution of higher education and research, located in Ranelagh, County Dublin, Ireland.

From November 1989, when it was granted designated status under the National Council for Educational Awards, it developed and offered programmes leading to Bachelor, Masters and Doctoral awards.

From 2005 until 2015, it was a "Recognised College" of the National University of Ireland. Under the 1997 Universities Act, the Irish government removed the ban on the NUI awarding degrees in Theology which had stood since its foundation and its predecessor the Royal University of Ireland.

The Milltown Institute was also an Ecclesiastical Faculty with official designation by the Congregation for Catholic Education in Rome.

By 2011, the future of the Milltown Institute had become uncertain and it was finally decided to close the Institute permanently.

== Jesuit Novitiate ==
The origins of the institute can be traced back to 1860, when the Jesuits in Ireland became a separate Province (since 1830 it had been a sub-province). A Jesuit Novitiate was established in Milltown Park and the Jesuits established a School of Philosophy (Philosophate) and a School of Theology (Theologate) at Milltown. Jesuits studied for secular degrees in University College Dublin (for a time under the control of the Jesuits) and did their religious studies at Milltown, as the National University of Ireland (like the Royal University of Ireland before it) was prohibited from awarding Theology degrees. The School of Theology had had an unbroken history at Milltown since 1889, and became a Jesuit Pontifical Faculty in 1932. The School of Philosophy moved from Milltown in 1930 to St Stanislaus College, Tullabeg, County Offaly, became a Jesuit Pontifical Faculty in 1948, and returned to Milltown in 1962. In 1949 land adjacent to Milltown Park was purchased by Rector O'Grady, where Gonzaga College was opened in 1950 and in 1951 the Catholic Workers College (later the National College of Industrial Relations now the National College of Ireland) was set up. In the 1960s the public Milltown Lectures were conducted. With the decline in vocations, the Milltown Institute was created in 1968.

=== Rectors of Milltown Park ===
- Fr. Daniel Jones, S.J.
- Fr. Edmund O'Reilly, S.J. (1863-1870)
- Fr. William Sutton, S.J. (1895-1903)
- Fr. Peter Finlay, S.J. (1905-1910)
- Fr. Albert Power S.J. (1910-1918)
- Fr. Martin Maher S.J. (1918-?)
- Fr. Fergus O'Donoghue S.J.
- Fr. Joseph Lentaigne S.J.
- Fr. John Hannon S.J. (1924-1930)
- Fr. Cyril Power S.J. (1930-1938)
- Fr. John McMahon, S.J. (1938-
- Fr. Michael Aloysius (Louis) O'Grady, S.J. (1947-1953) became provincial in 1953
- Bp. James Corboy, S.J., (1959-1962), became Bishop of Monze, Zambia
- Fr. Cecil McGarry, S.J., became Provincial in 1968, and later served the East African Province
- Fr. Noel Barber, S.J.,
- Fr. Conall O'Cuinn S.J., BSc(Hons), BPhil, BD (2010-2014)
- Fr. Bill Callanan S.J., BA, MPhil

== Miltown Institute ==
Milltown Institute was established as a Pontifical Athenaeum with Faculties of Theology and Philosophy by a group of religious institutes in 1968. In 1968 the Carmelites, who previously had trained in Gort Mhuire, began studying in Milltown. 1979 saw the Bachelor of Divinity (BD) programme approved by the Teaching Council of Ireland.

The Lonergan Centre, a research centre for the study of the works of Canadian theologian and philosopher Bernard Lonergan, was founded in 1975 in Milltown by Conn O’Donovan SJ and Philip McShane SJ.

In 1984 a programme of studies in Spirituality was introduced. The Pastoral Department came into being in 1987, with its one-year Diploma in Pastoral Studies. In 1989 a two-year evening adult theology course commenced.

In 1989 Certificates and Diplomas were validated by the Irish Government's National Council for Education Awards (NCEA), the forerunner of HETAC, for the first time, and Milltown became a designated NCEA centre.

In 1993, the BA programmes in Theology and Philosophy and the National Diploma in Philosophical Studies joined the CAO system for applications to third-level courses; from 1994 degree students were eligible to apply for Higher Education Grants; and in 1995 students of NCEA courses became eligible for the government free fees initiative. In 1996, the BA was recognised by the Teaching Council of Ireland for the teaching of religion in post-primary/secondary schools.

2001 saw the start of the MA in Applied Spirituality, validated by HETAC until NUI recognition in 2005; this programme moved to All Hallows College in 2012.

An undergraduate Bachelor of Theology programme in conjunction with the University of Wales, Lampeter, was launched in September 2003. The institute also developed a number of post-graduate initiatives with Lampeter.

In 2003 the Kimmage Mission Institute (KMI) Institute of Theology and Cultures moved from Kimmage Manor to Milltown, becoming part of the Department of Mission Theology and Culture, and from 2006 the alliance was made permanent.

The KMI Bachelor of Arts in Theology and Anthropology degree was also recognised as a qualification for teaching religion in post-primary schools. From 1 September 2005 until 2015, Milltown was a Recognised College of the National University of Ireland (NUI). Education Minister Mary Hannifan and NUI Chancellor Garret Fitzgerald attended the ceremony bestowing Recognised College status on Milltown.

Milltown validated certificate, diploma, bachelor's degree and master's degree courses for The Carmelite Institute of Britain and Ireland (CIBI) from 2006 until 2015. The director of CIBI and Dean of Theology at Milltown, Patrick Mullins OCarm, ran distance learning theology programmes for Milltown as www.onlinemilltown.com.

== Closure ==
The Milltown Institute closed at the end of July 2015. After the Jesuit-founded University College Dublin rejected Milltown's approaches the institution negotiated with Trinity College Dublin to continue its existence as the Loyola Institute in a centre of study, along with the Irish School of Ecumenics. The property in Milltown was sold and a new facility was established at Trinity College Dublin's campus in the centre of Dublin. Staff and faculty members who held positions until 2011, for the most part, did not continue within the new Loyola Institute. The final conferring of Ecclesiastical and HETAC awards took place on 2 October 2012, with NUI awards on 3 October 2012. The Carmelite programmes moved back to the Carmelite Institute of Britain and Ireland in Gort Mhuire in 2015, and programmes began to be awarded by Maynooth College. Most of the buildings at Milltown Park, some 10.5 acres of the 18-acre site, were sold in 2020.

=== The Jesuit Library ===
Since the foundation at Milltown Park of the Jesuit Schools of Philosophy and Theology, the Irish Jesuits had gathered publications, and the library finally held 140,000 volumes and over 2000 journals. A purpose-built Jesuit Library was opened in 1938 to house the collection. The Library had also increased its holdings on spirituality when the programme was run in Milltown; in 2016 the SpIRE Library was established at Milltown Park. Some of the holiding from the Jesuit Library were transferred to that library which also received a donation of spirituality books from All Hallows College given that Dr Michael O'Sullivan and Dr Bernadette Flanagan ran the spirituality programmes at All Hallows College and were the co-founders of SpIRE at Milltown Park.

==== Library sale ====
Following the closure of the Institute, books from its library were sold in London in 2017 by Sotheby's. The sale included rare and important books bequeathed to the Irish province of the Jesuits by the bibliophile judge William O'Brien upon his death in 1899.

==== Jesuit-DCU partnership ====
The Dublin City University Jesuit Library Partnership saw the Milltown Park Library's 140,000 volumes move to Woodlock Hall in DCU's All Hallows College Campus, where the Theology faculty is based, on a ten-year loan.

=== Spirituality Institute for Research and Education (SpIRE) ===
SpIRE was set up in 2015 SpIRE to raise awareness of spirituality as an applied academic discipline. Starting in August 2016, SpIRE in conjunction with the Waterford Institute of Technology, began to deliver an MA in Applied Spirituality from Milltown Park, Dublin. This MA, along with PhDs in spirituality studies are awarded by the South East Technological University (SETU) following the creation of that university in May 2022.

SpIRE replaced the Spiritual Capital Ireland Centre conceived by Dr Michael O’Sullivan, SJ (Director of the MA in Applied Spirituality at Milltown Institute), Dr Michael Howlett (Head of the Dept of Applied Arts, Waterford Institute of Technology), and Dr Bernadette Flanagan, PBVM (Director of Research, All Hallows College) as a new Inter-Institutional Centre for Spirituality and Social Transformation. The Centre was launched on 10th December, 2008, the 40th anniversary of the death of Thomas Merton.

Dr Howlett and Dr Flanagan, representing the collaborating third level institutions, spoke at the launch about the plans for the new Centre, while Dr Rana Jawad, Leverhulme Research Fellow, Spiritual Capital Project, University of Manchester, and Dr O’Sullivan, the European member of the Governing Board of the International Society for the Study of Christian Spirituality and of the Steering Committee of the Christian Spirituality Study Group of the American Academy of Religion, gave presentations on spiritual capital and social transformation.

The launch event at Waterford Institute of Technology was held under the auspices of the SophiaEuropa Research Project, funded by the Metanexus Institute. A similar event was held at All Hallows College on 25 February 2009 with Dr Chris Baker, Director of Research for the William Temple Foundation, as the keynote speaker. The Centre was replaced by SpIRE following the closure of All Hallows College in 2015. The co-founders of SpIRE are Dr Flanagan and Dr O'Sullivan. SpIRE is a registered charity (www.spiritualityinstitute.ie).

== Milltown Studies ==
Milltown Studies was a twice-yearly journal, first published in 1977 by the Milltown Institute, on theology, philosophy spirituality, literature, culture and history. Contributors included Lambert McKenna SJ, Thomas Morrissey SJ, Martin McNamara, John Navone SJ, Thomas O'Loughlin, Mary Midgley and Imogen Stuart. It ceased publication in 2015 after a double edition (Nos. 77 & 78).

== People Associated with the Milltown Institute ==
=== Presidents of the Milltown Institute ===
- James McPolin SJ president (1983–1989)
- Paul Lennon OCarm (1989–1995) first non-jesuit president
- John Macken SJ president (1995–1996)
- Brian Grogan SJ served as president of the institute (–2006)
- Bernadette Flanagan PBVM acting president (2006–2007) – director of Spirituality Institute
- Finbar Clancy SJ acting president (2008)
- Cornelius J Casey CSsR president (2008–2010) – formerly president of Kimmage Mission Institute (1996–1999)
- Thomas R. Whelan CSsP president/rector (2010– ) – formerly president of Kimmage Mission Institute (2001–2003)

=== People who have Studied at Milltown ===
- Pope Francis spent eight weeks in Milltown studying English in 1980.
- Stephen Chow, Bishop of Hong Kong, graduated with a Licentiate in Philosophy
- Paul Dempsey (bishop), Bishop of Achonry, completed a master's degree in theology in Milltown
- Mary McAleese, former Irish president, earned a H.Dip. and MA in canon law from Milltown
- Alan McGuckian, SJ, Bishop of Raphoe, studied philosophy at Milltown
- Rev. Fr. James Conlon, Diocese of Lansing, Michigan and Ecclesiastical Assistant for the International Federation of Pueri Cantores. Graduated with a master's degree in Theology at Milltown.

== See also ==
- List of Jesuit educational institutions
- List of Jesuit sites in Ireland
