= William Carleton =

Irish author (1794–1869

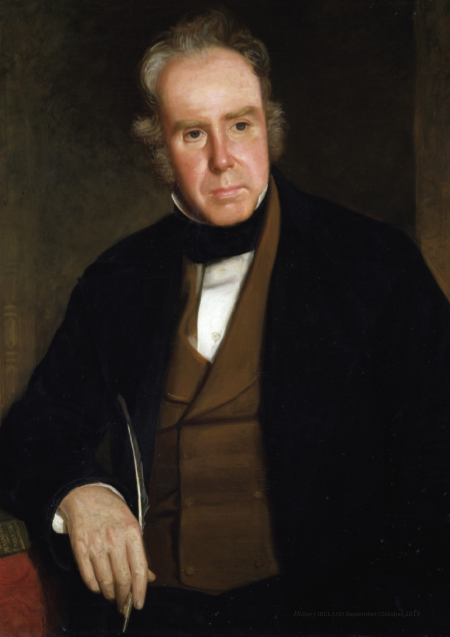
William Carleton by John Slattery, circa 1850s

William Carleton (4 March 1794, Prolusk (often spelt as Prillisk as on his gravestone), Clogher, County Tyrone – 30 January 1869, Sandford Road, Ranelagh, Dublin) was an Irish writer and novelist. He is best known for his Traits and Stories of the Irish Peasantry, a collection of ethnic sketches of the stereotypical Irishman.

== Childhood ==
Carleton's father was a Roman Catholic tenant farmer, who supported fourteen children on as many acres, and young Carleton passed his early life among scenes similar to those he later described in his books. Carleton was steeped in folklore from an early age. His father, who had an extraordinary memory (he knew the bible by heart) and as a native Irish speaker, a thorough acquaintance with Irish folklore, told stories by the fireside. His mother, a noted singer, sang in Irish. The character of Honor, the miser's wife, in Fardorougha, is said to be based on her.

Carleton received a basic education. As his father moved from one small farm to another, he attended various hedge schools, which used to be a notable feature of Irish life. A picture of one of these schools occurs in the sketch called "The Hedge School" included in Traits and Stories of Irish Peasantry. Most of his learning was gained from a curate, Father Keenan, who taught a classical school at Glennan (near Glaslough) in the parish of Donagh (County Monaghan) which Carleton attended from 1814 to 1816. He studied for the priesthood at Maynooth, but left after two years. Carleton had hoped to obtain an education as a poor scholar at Munster, with a view to entering the church; but he was shaken by an ominous dream, the story of which is told in the Poor Scholar, and he returned home. An amusing account of this period is given in the sketch, "Denis O'Shaughnessy".

Aged about nineteen, he undertook one of the religious pilgrimages then common in Ireland. His experiences as a pilgrim, narrated in "The Lough Derg Pilgrim," made him give up the thought of entering the church, and he eventually became a Protestant.

== Career ==
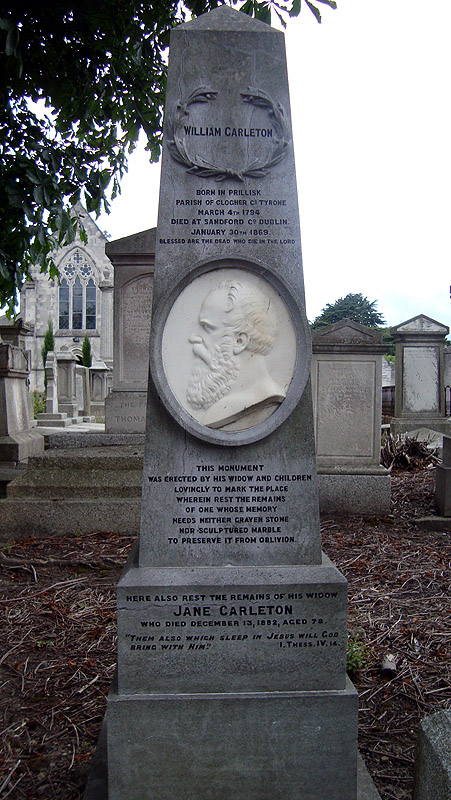
Grave of William Carleton

His vacillating ideas as to a mode of life were determined by reading the picaresque novel Gil Blas (by Alain-René Lesage, 1668–1747). He decided to try what fortune had in store for him. He went to Killanny, County Louth. For six months he served as tutor to the family of a farmer named Piers Murphy. After some other experiments he set out for Dublin, arriving with two shillings and sixpence in his pocket.

He first sought occupation as a bird-stuffer, but a proposal to use potatoes and meal as stuffing failed to recommend him. He then tried to become a soldier, but the colonel of the regiment dissuaded him—Carleton had applied in Latin. After staying in a number of cheap lodgings, he eventually found a place in a house on Francis St., which contained a circulating library. The landlady allowed him to read from 12 to 16 hours a day. He obtained some teaching and a clerkship in a Sunday School office, began to contribute to journals, and "The Pilgrimage to Lough Derg," which was published in the Christian Examiner, attracted great attention.

In 1830 he published his first full-length book, Traits and Stories of the Irish Peasantry (2 vols.), which made his name and is considered his best achievement. In it he stereotyped the Irish "Paddy" in sketches such as "Phil Purcel The Pig Driver". A second series (3 vols.), containing, among other stories, "Tubber Derg, or the Red Well", appeared in 1833, and Tales of Ireland in 1834. From that time till within a few years of his death he wrote constantly. "Fardorougha the Miser, or the Convicts of Lisnamona" appeared in 1837–1838 in the Dublin University Magazine.

Carleton remained active publishing in Dublin magazines through the 1830s and 40s writing many ethnic stories often drawn from the south Tyrone locality. He also wrote a lot of fiction but, as John Sutherland (1989) says, it was inferior to his ethnic sketches of the Irish type. During the last months of his life Carleton began an autobiography which he brought down to the beginning of his literary career. This forms the first part of The Life of William Carleton ... (2 vols., 1896), by David James O'Donoghue, which contains full information about his life, and a list of his scattered writings. A selection from his stories (1889), in the "Camelot Series", has an introduction by William Butler Yeats.

The author's later years were characterised by drunkenness and poverty, as one commentator said: "he succeeded in offending everybody during the course of his life. In spite of his considerable literary production, Carleton remained poor, but received a pension in 1848 of £200 a year granted by Lord John Russell in response to a memorial on Carleton's behalf signed by numbers of distinguished persons in Ireland.

He died at his home (now demolished) at Woodville, Sandford Road, in (Cullenswood) Ranelagh, Dublin, and is interred at Mount Jerome Cemetery, Harold's Cross, Dublin. The house was close to the entrance to the Jesuit residence at Milltown Park. Despite his conversion to Protestantism, Carleton remained on friendly terms with one of the priests there, Reverend Robert Carbery SJ, who offered to give him the Last Rites of the Catholic Church. Carleton, in the final weeks before his death in January 1869, politely declined the offer, stating he had not been a Roman Catholic "for half a century & more".

== Controversial reputation ==
Carleton alienated the sympathies of many Catholic Irishmen by his accusations of gang violence, sectarian violence, and alcoholism among the Irish tenant class. He was in his own words the "historian of their habits and manners, their feelings, their prejudices, their superstitions and their crimes" (Preface to Tales of Ireland). Some of his later stories, The Squanders of Castle Squander (1852) for instance, are spoiled by the mass of political matter in them.

=== Anti-Catholicism ===
Another factor that alienated Carleton from his fellow Irishmen was his intense hatred of the Catholic Church in Ireland to which the majority of his countrymen belonged. It has been argued (for example by Brian Donnelly) that Carleton's conversion to Anglicanism may have been a pragmatic move, as it would have been difficult for an aspiring young Catholic author to receive the patronage necessary to achieve success in early 19th-century Ireland.

However, Donnelly's arguments fail when compared to Carleton's own statements in an 1826 letter to the Home Secretary, Sir Robert Peel. Carleton urged Peel to violently suppress Daniel O'Connell's activism for Catholic Emancipation, and claimed to have proof of O'Connell's involvement in fomenting anti-Protestant and anti-Landlord violence, while also accusing every Roman Catholic priest and schoolmaster of the same crimes.

Shortly afterwards, Carleton befriended a Church of Ireland minister named Caesar Otway. According to W. B. Yeats, Reverend Otway was an, "anti-papal controversialist," who encouraged Carleton to write stories to "highlight...the corrupt practices of an ignorant clergy."

Frank O'Connor said that Carleton debased his talents by taking sides in Ireland's religious divide. O'Connor admits, however, that Carleton could not win either way. In Victorian era Ireland, Protestant readers were demanding stories which unconditionally demonised Catholicism and its adherents, while Catholic readers, "wanted to read nothing about themselves that was not treacle." As a result, Carleton's writings were invariably, "rent asunder by faction-fighters who wished him to write from one distorted standpoint or the other."

== Influence ==
Carleton figures as a precursor of the Celtic revival.

Carleton is featured in the long poem Station Island by Séamus Heaney.

The International Astronomical Union named a crater on the planet Mercury Carleton in his honour on 19 October 2018.

== Bibliography ==
- Carleton, William (1829), Father Butler. The Lough Dearg Pilgrim
- Traits and Stories of the Irish Peasantry, 1st Series, 1830
  - Volume I, 1830 Ned M'Keown; The Three Tasks; Shane Fadh's Wedding; Larry M'Farland's Wake; The Battle of the Factions
  - Volume II, 1830 The Funeral and the Party Fight; The Hedge School, and the Abduction of May Kavanagh; The Station
- Traits and Stories of the Irish Peasantry, 2nd Series, 1834
  - Volume I, 1834 The Midnight Mass; The Donagh, or the Horse-Stealers; Phil Purcel, the Pig-Driver; The Geography of an Irish Oath; An Essay on Irish Swearing
  - Volume II, 1834 The Lianhan Shee; The Poor Scholar; Wildgoose Lodge; Tubber Derg, or, the Red Well;
  - Volume III, 1834 Denis O'Shaughnessy Going to Maynooth; Phelim O'Tooles Courtship
- Tales of Ireland, 1834 The Death of a Devotee; The Priest's Funeral; Neal Malone; The Brothers; The Illicit Distiller; The Dream of a Broken Heart; Lachlin Murray and the Blemished Candle
  - Published in the US as Neil Malone and other Tales of Ireland (1839)
- Fardorougha the Miser, or The Convicts of Lisnamona, 1839
- The Fawn of Springvale, The Clarionet and other Tales, 1841
  - Volume I, Dublin, W. Curry, jun and company [etc., etc.], 1841 Jane Sinclair, or, the Fawn of Spring Vale; Lha Dhu, or, the Dark Day
  - Volume II, Dublin, W. Curry, jun and company [etc., etc.], 1841 The Clarionet; The Dead Boxer
  - Carleton, William (1843), Volume III The Misfortunes of Barney Branagan; The Resurrections of Barney Bradley
- Valentine M'Clutchy, the Irish Agent, or Chronicles of the Castle Cumber Property, Dublin, J. Duffy, 1845
  - Volume I, Dublin, J. Duffy [etc., etc.], 1845
  - Volume II, Dublin, J. Duffy [etc., etc.], 1845
  - Volume III, Dublin, J. Duffy [etc., etc.], 1845
- Denis O'Shaughnessy Going to Maynooth, 1845
- Tales and sketches, illustrating the character, usages, traditions, sports and pastimes of the Irish peasantry, 1845 Mickey M'Roney, the Irish Fiddler; Buckramback, the Country Dancing-Master; Mary Murray, the Irish Match-Maker; Bob Pentland, or, The Gauger Outwitted; The Fate of Frank M'Kenna; The Rival Kempers; Frank Martin and the Faires; A Legend of Knockmany; Rose Moan, the Irish Midwife; Talbot and Gaynor, Irish Pipers; Frank Finnigan, the Foster-Brother; Tom Gressiey, the Irish Senachie; The Castle of Aughentain ..; Barney M'Haigney; Moll Roe's Marriage; Barney Brady's Goose; Condy Cullen; A Record of the Heart; The Three Wishes; The Irish Rake; Stories of Second-Sight and Apparition
- Art Maguire or the Broken Pledge, 1847 [1845]
- Rody the Rover or the Ribbonman, 1845
- Parra Sastha or the History of Paddy Go Easy and his wife Nancy, 1845
- The Black Prophet, a Tale of Irish Famine, 1899 [1847]
- The Emigrants : A Tale of Irish Life, 1857 [1848]
- The Tithe Proctor. A novel. Being a tale of the tithe rebellion in Ireland, 1849
- The Squanders of Castle Squander, 1852
  - Volume I, 1852
  - Volume II, 1852
- Red Hall, or The Baronet's Daughter, 1852, later republished as The Black Baronet; or, The Chronicles of BallyTrain, 3 vols
- Valentine M'Clutchy, the Irish agent, or, The chronicles of Castle Cumber, 1854
- Willy Reilly and his dear Coleen Bawn, 1856 [1855]
- Alley Sheridan and Other Stories, 1857
- The Evil Eye, or The Black Spectre, 1896 [1860]
- The Double Prophecy, or, Trials of the Heart, 1862, 2 vols
- Redmond Count O'Hanlon, the Irish Rapparee, New York, P.J. Kenedy, 1896 [1862]
- The Silver Acre and other Tales, 1862

Biography

- O'Donoghue, David James, ed. (1896), The Life of William Carleton, vol. I
- O'Donoghue, David James, ed. (1896), The Life of William Carleton, vol. II

Posthumous compilations

- The Works of William Carleton
  - Volume I, 1881; Willy Reilly; Fardorougha the Miser; The Black Baronet; The Evil Eye;
  - Volume II, New York, Collier, 1881; Jane Sinclair; The Dead Boxer; Elle Duncan; The Proctor's Daughter; Valentine M'Clutchy, the Irish Agent; The Tithe Proctor; The Emigrants of Ahadarra
  - Volume III, New York, Collier, 1881; Traits and Stories..; The Black Prophet; Wild Goose Lodge; Tubber Derg; Neal Malone; Art Maguire

== Sources ==
- Dooley, Terence (2006). Wildgoose Lodge. Four Courts Press. ISBN 978-1-84682-112-7.
- Dillon, Charles, ed. (2000). Tyrone: History and Society. Dublin: Geographic Publications.
- Hayley, Barbara (1985). A Bibliography of the writings of William Carleton. Colin Smythe. ISBN 0-86140-188-3.
- Kelly, John. "Carleton, William (1794–1869)". Oxford Dictionary of National Biography (online ed.). Oxford University Press. doi:10.1093/ref:odnb/4679. (Subscription, Wikipedia Library access or UK public library membership required.)
- Smith, George Barnett (1887). "Carleton, William (1794-1869)" . In Stephen, Leslie (ed.). Dictionary of National Biography. Vol. 9. London: Smith, Elder & Co.
