= Denis Coffey (physician) =

University President

Denis J. Coffey was an Irish Professor of Physiology at the Catholic University Medical School, Dean of Medicine at UCD, and served as president of University College Dublin from 1910 until 1940.

Denis Joseph Coffey was born in 1865 in Tralee, County Kerry. Educated locally at the Christian Brothers in Holy Cross, Tralee, he entered the Catholic University of Ireland School of Medicine, Cecilia St., Dublin, and graduated with a BA in 1886, and with a medical degree MB BCh BAO from the Royal University of Ireland in 1888. Gaining the RUI Travelling studentship, he studied physiology in Madrid, Louvain, Marburg, and Leipzig.

Returning to Ireland, he taught at Catholic University Medical School, in Cecilia Street, Dublin, from 1893, and was professor from 1897, and from 1905 Dean(Registrar) of the Catholic Medical School as it merged with University College Dublin, becoming its Faculty of Medicine. A nationalist who supported Home Rule, he was a close friend of John Dillon; he was also a member of the Gaelic League. He was made a Fellow of the Royal College of Physicians in Ireland, and served as pro-vice-chancellor of the National University of Ireland. Coffey was awarded the Knight Grand Cross of the Pontifical Order of St. Sylvester (GCSS) by the pope for his services to education. In 1936 he was awarded an honorary degree LLD from Queen's University Belfast.

Coffey succeeded William Delany SJ becoming the first president of UCD as a constituent college of the National University of Ireland. He oversaw the development of UCD at Earlsfort Terrace, the merger of the College of Science, the Agricultural Albert College, and the move of the Medical School to UCD. He retired in 1940; also in 1940, he was awarded an Honorary DSc by the NUI, and he died on 3 April 1945.

His son was the poet and publisher Brian Coffey(1905-1995).

Academic offices
Preceded by William Delany SJ	President of the University College Dublin; 1910–1840	Succeeded by Arthur W. Conway
