= Spirituality Institute for Research and Education =

Irish organisation

- Established: 2015 (www.spiritualityinstitute.ie)
- Affiliations: Waterford Institute of Technology
- Chairperson: Dr. Bernadette Flanagan PBVM
- Director: Dr. Michael O'Sullivan SJ
- Location: Milltown Park, Milltown Road, Dublin 6, D06 V9K7, Ireland, Dublin, Ireland
- Nickname: SpIRE
- Website: https://www.spiritualityinstitute.ie

The Spirituality Institute for Research and Education (SpIRE) was established in 2015 to raise awareness of spirituality as an applied academic discipline. Starting in August 2016, SpIRE in conjunction with the Waterford Institute of Technology delivers an MA in Applied Spirituality which was run from All Hallows College, Dublin and awarded by Dublin City University (prior to it closing down its academic programmes), and which had earlier been run from Jesuit Milltown Institute of Theology and Philosophy awarded by the National University of Ireland, from 2001 until it suspended its academic programmes in 2012. The Jesuit Library in Milltown, has acquired a number of books donated by All Hallows College from the John Hand Library on spirituality.

Lectures and seminars are delivered in the Jesuit Centre, Milltown Park, and students have access to the newly created (2020) SpIRE library and facilities in Milltown Park. The objective would be to develop the programmes, to include Doctoral research.

Founded by Dr. Michael O'Sullivan SJ who is the Executive Director of SpIRE and MA programme leader and Dr Bernadette Flanagan PBVM who serves as chair of SpIRE, both had previously worked at the Milltown Institute and were also colleagues at All Hallows College.

Members of the SpIRE Advisory Committee include Dr Noelia Molina, Dr Noel Keating, Dr Elizabeth McCrory, Dr Bernadette Flanagan, and emeritus Prof. Michael Howlett (WIT). Prof. Fiona Timmins (Trinity College Dublin) and Dr Michael Murray served on this committee for a number of years, as did Dara Westby.

In August 2016 SpIRE hosted a Summer School in Milltown Institutes Conference Centre, the second SpIRE Summer School - Journeying with Spirit is scheduled for August 2017. SpIRE and WIT hosted the first international conference in this country on Pilgrimage and the Evolution of Spiritual Tourism took place in WIT in March 2018. In May 2019, SpIRE and WIT hosted and ran the 2019 European Spirituality in Economics and Society (SPES) Society Annual Conference, Spirituality in Society and the Professions.

== Graduation ==
November 2017 saw the first graduates (twenty) from the MA programme, conferred by the Waterford Institute of Technology, a first such awards by an Institute of Technology, as well as a PhD in spirituality. Eighteen graduated from the MA programme in 2018.
