= Paul Mooney (college president) =

Former National College of Ireland president

7th President of National College of Ireland
- In office January 2007 – February 2010
- Preceded by: Professor Joyce O'Connor
- Succeeded by: Dr. Phillip Matthews

Personal details
- Education: National College of Ireland; Trinity College Dublin
- Website: Website

Dr. Paul Mooney was appointed President of National College of Ireland, based in North Wall, Dublin, in February 2007. He holds a Ph.D. (Doctorate in Industrial Sociology), a Graduate Diploma (Industrial Relations), a National Diploma in Industrial Relations and is a Fellow of the Chartered Institute of Personnel and Development.

== Biography ==
Mooney began his working life as a butcher in Dublin. After completing a formal apprenticeship, he moved into production management. He subsequently joined General Electric and held a number of Human resources positions in manufacturing.

After General Electric, Mooney worked with Sterling Drug in the start-up of their plant in Waterford. Subsequently, as human resource director for the Pacific Rim, he had responsibility for all personnel activity in South East Asia.

On his return to Ireland, Mooney established PMA Consulting (1991), a management development consultancy.

== Published works ==
Mooney is the author of eight books. One, the "Badger Ruse", is a crime thriller set in Dublin, while the others cover a wide range of topics in the HR area.

- Developing the high performance organisation best practice for managers, ISBN 1-86076-019-8, Published in 1996, Oak Tree Press (Dublin)
- Developing the High Organisation, Publication Date: 1996
- The Effective Consultant, ISBN 978-1-86076-121-8, Publisher: Oak Tree Press (27 May 1999)
- Keeping Your Best Staff : The Human Resources Challenge in a Competitive Environment, ISBN 978-1-86076-154-6, Publication Date: 1999, Abebooks.co.uk
- Turbo-charging the HR Function, ISBN 978-0-85292-896-7, Publication Date: 1 Feb 2001, Easons
- Union-Free: Creating a Committed and Productive Workforce, Publication Date: 2005, The Liffey Press
- The Badger Ruse, ISBN 978-1-4120-2897-4, Publisher: Trafford Publishing (6 July 2006), Amazon
- Desperate Executives, ISBN 978-1-905785-39-1, Publication Date: 2008,The Liffey Press
