= National College of Ireland =

Third-level institution in Dublin, Ireland

Coordinates: 53.348896°N 6.24322°W

- Former names: National College of Industrial Relations; The Catholic Workers College
- Type: Independent Higher Education College
- Established: February 1951; 75 years ago
- Affiliations: QQI; Chartered Institute of Personnel and Development; HETAC (2001-?); NCEA (1976-2001); Jesuits (1951-1998)
- Chairman: Brendan McGinty
- President: Gina Quin
- Academic staff: 204 full-time
- Students: 6,000
- Location: IFSC, Dublin, Ireland
- Campus: Urban 0.8 acres (0.32 ha)
Colours
- Website: www.ncirl.ie

National College of Ireland (NCI; Irish: Coláiste Náisiúnta na hÉireann or CNÉ) is a not-for-profit, state-aided third-level education institution in Dublin. It was founded in 1951 as a joint venture between the Jesuits in Ireland and Irish trade unions, and was originally named the Catholic Workers College, Dublin. It is now an independent higher education institution, offering full and part-time courses from undergraduate to postgraduate level, in the areas of business, computing, psychology and education.

Courses are delivered both from the IFSC campus in Dublin and online. The campus is located close to the city centre and is serviced by the Mayor Square – NCI stop on the Luas Red Line. Facilities available on the campus include a library, gym, restaurant, recreation room and the Students' Union. In October 2022, it was announced that NCI completed the purchase of the West Wing, Block R, Spencer Dock which allow for a campus expansion. The building opened to students and staff in October 2023.

== History ==
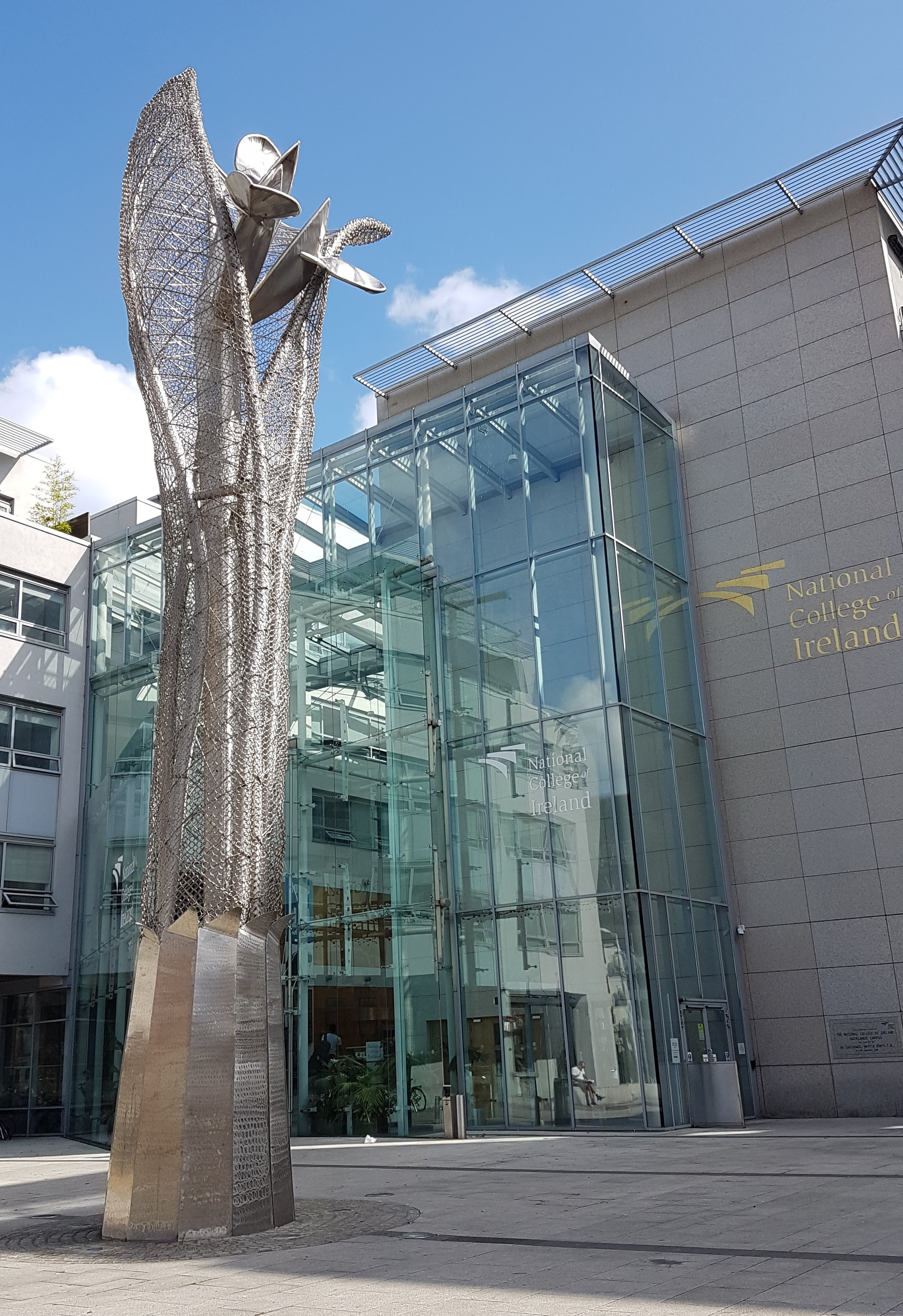
National College of Ireland's campus building in Dublin

In 1951, the National College of Ireland started out as the Catholic Workers College, Dublin in Sandford Lodge, Ranelagh. Founded by Fr. Edward Coyne S.J., in association with Trade Unionists such as Walter Beirne others involved in the college in its initial years included Professor Thomas A. Finlay S.J., and Rev. Edmund Kent S.J. among others.

Lectures were led by a handful of dedicated Jesuits two nights a week, with 103 registered students in the first year. Within 10 years, student numbers had dramatically increased. Links with trade unions deepened, as did formal collaborations with employer and management groups.

By 1966, nearly 1,300 students from trade union and business management backgrounds were learning together at the re-branded National College of Industrial Relations (NCIR).

In 1974-75, the College of Industrial Relations ran day-time short courses for the Unemployed.

In 1976, the college achieved recognition by the states National Council for Educational Awards (NCEA), the forerunner of HETAC, for a number of its programmes.

The institution again re-branded as the National College of Ireland (NCI) in 1998, with an expanded National Campus Network, and an array of outreach programmes across the country. As the NCI continued to grow, the land and buildings at Sandford Road were transferred by the Jesuits to the NCI Board of Management. The college’s Higher Certificate, Bachelor, Higher Diploma, and Master courses are accredited by the Irish government's Quality and Qualifications Ireland (QQI); a number of other short term courses are unaccredited.

At the turn of the century, NCI relocated to a 0.8-hectare (2.0-acre) site on Mayor Street in the Dublin Docklands. A€25,000,000 fundraising campaign resulted in the development of a modern campus including 53 residential apartments accommodating 286 students and a new Business and Research Building.

In 2009 and 2010 the college ran a series of free debates called the Insight Debate Series, organised in partnership with The Irish Times and the radio station Newstalk 106-108 FM. The college's Legends in your Lunchtime series saw public figures such as Ben Dunne, Willie Walsh and Giovanni Trapattoni interviewed live by a Newstalk presenter. In 2012 the College's chairman Denis O'Brien and Jeffrey Ullman, emeritus Stanford professor and 2020 ACM A.M. Turing Award winner, opened the NCI's Cloud Competency Centre. NCI was successful in 2021 in joining the European, Erasmus Charter in Higher Education (ECHE).

In 2023, NCI appointed Brendan McGinty as chairperson of the college's Governing Body.

In late 2022, it was announced that the college had purchased a new building nearby at Spencer Dock to extend the existing campus. Building work was done to transform the building into an educational space with a number of classrooms added as well as an extended library across two floors, numerous group and individual study spaces, a restaurant and offices for the Early Learning Initiative. The building opened to students and staff in October 2023.

== Faculties ==
The college has a number of faculties that are responsible for the delivery of courses:

=== School of Business ===
NCI’s School of Business is the academic home to over 2,500 students studying programmes at both undergraduate and postgraduate level. The approach to teaching is to blend a variety of classroom, group, and experiential activities to enhance the learning experience of students.

Dr Colette Darcy is the Dean of the School of Business at National College of Ireland.

=== School of Computing ===
NCI’s School of Computing has expanded greatly in the last few years, reacting quickly to changing needs and developments in the ICT sector. The programmes provide hands-on practical experience which produce exceptional graduates. The NCI School of Computing distinguished International Advisory Board consists of the following leading academics:

- Professor Jeffrey D. Ullman, Stanford W. Ascherman Professor of Computer Science, Stanford University (Board Chairperson)
- Michael Franklin, Liew Family Chairman of Computer Science, Senior Advisor to the Provost for Computing and Data Science, Faculty Co-Director, Data Science Institute, at University of Chicago
- Professor Armando Fox, Professor of Computer Science and Faculty Advisor for Digital Learning Strategy at UC Berkeley
- Professor John E. Hopcroft, NCI Fellow and IBM Professor of Engineering and Applied Mathematics in Computer Science at Cornell University

Dr Paul Stynes is the Dean of the School of Computing at National College of Ireland.

=== Centre for Education and Lifelong Learning ===
The Centre for Education and Lifelong Learning offers programmes in Early Childhood Education and Care, Further Education and Teacher Professional Development. NCI's faculty are at the forefront of education and learning innovation with research and practitioner expertise in Early Childhood Education and Care, Further Education, Technology Enhanced Learning, Lifelong Learning and design for 21st Century skills.

Dr Leo Casey is the Director of the Centre for Education and Lifelong Learning at National College of Ireland.

== Courses ==
The college offers full and part-time courses – at undergraduate and postgraduate levels – in business, computing, psychology and education. The School of Business offers studies in human resource management, marketing, accounting, finance, management, entrepreneurship, international business and psychology, while the School of Computing provides education in data analytics, cloud computing, cybersecurity, artificial intelligence, software development, web development, blockchain and fintech. The Centre for Education and Lifelong Learning offers programmes in early childhood education, technology-enhanced learning and further education.

== Awarding Bodies ==
National College of Ireland partners with a number of validating bodies to ensure that all programmes achieve appropriate recognition within industry, both nationally and internationally.

=== Quality and Qualifications Ireland (QQI) ===
Quality and Qualifications Ireland (QQI) is the Awarding Body for the Certificate, Diploma, Degree and Masters programmes offered by National College of Ireland (NCI).

=== Chartered Institute of Personnel and Development (CIPD) ===
The Chartered Institute of Personnel and Development (CIPD) is the professional body for HR and people development in Ireland.

== Presidents ==
- Fr. Edward Coyne S.J. (1951–1954)
- Fr. Edmund Kent S.J. (1954–1968)
- Fr. Kevin Quinn S.J. (1968–1972)
- Fr. John Brady S.J. (1972–1981)
- Fr. William Toner S.J.(1981–1983)
- Fr. Tom Morrissey S.J. (1983–1989)
- Prof. Joyce O'Connor (1990–2007)
- Dr. Paul Mooney (2007–2010)
- Dr. Phillip Matthews (2010–2016)
- Ms. Gina Quin (2016–present)

In February 2010 Dr. Phillip Matthews joined as president of the college, succeeding Dr. Paul Mooney. In August 2016, Dr. Matthews was succeeded by Gina Quin, the former CEO of Dublin Chamber of Commerce.

== Honorary Fellowship ==
National College of Ireland, as did its predecessor, the National College of Industrial Relations, awards an Honorary Fellowship from time to time. Awardees have included:

- 1988 – Sheila Conroy – trade unionist and president of The People's College
- 1998 – Dan McCauley
- 1998 – Con Murphy – Chair of ESB Industrial Council
- 2005 – Prof. John Hopcroft – computer scientist and 1986 ACM A.M. Turing Award winner.
- 2009 – Rev. John Brady SJ – economist, who worked for the college for thirty years
- 2009 – Ken Doherty – former snooker world champion
- 2009 – Maurice Healy – CEO of the Healy group
- 2015 – Rev. Dr. Noel Barber SJ – who served on the board of the NCI
- 2019 – Paul Reid (HSE) – former Director-General of the Health Service Executive
- 2019 – Fr. Peter McVerry – founder of the Peter McVerry Trust
