= James Corboy =

Irish Jesuit priest and Bishop of Monze, Zambia (1916–2004)

James Corboy, S.J., was an Irish Jesuit priest who served as Bishop of Monze, Zambia. He also served as Rector of the Jesuit Theology School at Milltown Park.

== Biography ==
Born on 20 October 1916 in Caherconlish, County Limerick, James was educated at the Jesuit schools of Crescent, Limerick and Clongowes Wood College. He joined the Jesuits in Emo Court. He trained as a Jesuit at St Stanislaus College, Tullabeg, and Rathfarnham Castle, while studying Arts in University College Dublin before teaching for a time in Belvedere College. Following his Theology Studies in Milltown he was ordained in 1948. He completed further studies in Rome at the Pontifical Gregorian University, receiving a doctorate in theology.

Returning to Milltown where he lectured in theology, Corboy served as Rector of Milltown from 1959 until 1962 when he was appointed Bishop of Monze, Zambia, then called North Rhodesia, a British Colony until 1964. Corboy was shaped by the Second Vatican Council, which started the same year as his bishopric, through which he believed evangelization include the whole person, not just souls.

Corboy was given the Tonga name of Cibinda, meaning "a wholesome person who knows where he is going and where he is leading others."

Following his retirement as Bishop in 1992, he worked for four years at St. Ignatius in Lusaka before returning to Ireland, where he stayed with the Jesuit Community in Milltown, where he worked as the Librarian. After living for a time in Cherryfield Nursing home, Corboy died on 24 November 2004 at St. Vincent's Hospital, Dublin.
