= List of fellows of the Royal Society elected in 1915 =

This is a complete list of fellows of the Royal Society elected in 1915. There were no foreign members elected.

== Fellows ==
- Sir Frederick William Andrewes
- Arthur William Conway
- Leonard Doncaster
- John Evershed
- Sir Walter Morley Fletcher
- Arthur George Green
- Sir Henry Hubert Hayden
- Sir James Mackenzie
- Arthur Thomas Masterman
- Sir John Cunningham McLennan
- Sir Gilbert Thomas Morgan
- Charles Samuel Myers
- Sir George Clarke Simpson
- Alan Archibald Campbell Swinton
- Sir Arthur George Tansley
