= Joyce O'Connor =

Irish academic, President of National College of Ireland 1990-2007

6th President of National College of Ireland
- In office 1990–2007
- Preceded by: Fr. Thomas Morrissey
- Succeeded by: Dr. Paul Mooney

Personal details
- Education: University College Dublin

Joyce O'Connor was President of National College of Ireland for fifteen years. She is a sister of Seán FitzPatrick.

Educated in Loreto Convent Bray and University College Dublin, O'Connor was Senior Research Fellow in the Department of Social Science, UCD and Head of the Department of Languages and Applied Social Studies at the University of Limerick where she founded and directed the Social Research Centre.

O'Connor has published widely on education and access issues, entrepreneurship, women in business, careers, innovation and enterprise, drinking & smoking behaviours and the elderly. Professor O’Connor is involved in many Corporate Social Responsibility (CSR) initiatives and is co-editor of a book on the area.

During her period as President she managed the major expansion of the College including the major increase in student numbers and the relocation of the College from Ranelagh to the campus in the IFSC.
