= Thomas Morrissey (Jesuit) =

Irish historian, President of the National College of Ireland

Thomas J. Morrissey

5th President of National College of Ireland
- In office 1983–1989
- Preceded by: Fr. Bill Toner
- Succeeded by: Prof. Joyce O'Connor

Personal details
- Born: Limerick, Ireland
- Education: University College Dublin; University College Cork
- Profession: Jesuit priest

Fr. Thomas "Tom" J. Morrissey, born in 1929 in Limerick (Ireland), is an Irish Jesuit priest. historian, teacher and writer. He was the fifth Director of Education at the College of Industrial Relations (National College of Ireland) from 1983 to 1989.

Fr. Morrissey was born in Limerick and was educated at Crescent College, Limerick. He entered the Jesuit Order in 1948. He studied history at University College Dublin and graduated with a master's degree. In 1976 he was awarded a doctorate in education at University College Cork. He taught at Sacred Heart College, Limerick and at Mungret College from 1963 to 1968.

He played a major role in the planning and development of Crescent College Comprehensive S.J. in Limerick and was its headmaster from 1969 until 1982.

He was Director of the College of Industrial Relations (National College of Ireland) from 1983 to 1990. During this time he developed a Board of Management to govern the college and registered it under the Companies Act (1963).

Fr Morrissey has published over twelve books. He wrote in 1980 James Archer of Kilkenny, the biography of a colourful and controversial sixteenth-century Jesuit, James Archer. In 2010 he published a biography of Edward Byrne, former archbishop of Dublin.

Fr. Morrissey serves on the board of the Jesuit Library in Milltown Park, Dublin.

== Bibliography ==
- Morrissey, Thomas J. (2003). Bishop Edward O'Dwyer of Limerick. Dublin: Four Courts Press.
- Morrissey, Thomas J. (2009). Where Two Traditions Meet: John Sullivan SJ, 1861-1933. Dublin: Columba Press.
- Morrissey, Thomas J. (2014). Laurence O'Neill (1864–1943) Lord Mayor of Dublin (1917–1924), patriot and man of peace. Dublin: Four Courts Press / Dublin City Council.
