= John Esmonde (United Irishman) =

Physician and member of the United Irishmen

John Esmonde was a physician from Sallins, County Kildare, and member of the United Irishmen, who was hanged in 1798 for having led the insurgents in the Battle of Prosperous, in Co. Kildare, during the risings of that year.

John Esmonde was the son of Sir James Esmonde (7th Baronet) and Ellice White. He married Helen O'Callan, a daughter of Bartholomew O'Callan, and they had five sons and one daughter. The eldest son, Thomas (1786–1868), succeeded his uncle Sir Thomas Esmonde, as the 9th baronet and was MP for Wexford (1841–7). Their second son, Bartholomew Esmonde (1789–1862) became a Jesuit priest, while their third son James joined the Royal Navy, and their fourth son Laurence joined the French Army.

Esmonde was a medical doctor and became a member of the Royal College of Surgeons in Ireland shortly after it was established. He attended the Catholic Convention.

As a lieutenant in the Clane Yeomanry, he was court-martialed and deemed a deserter, and was executed by hanging (with his coat reversed to indicated he was a deserter) on 13 June 1798.
