= Arthur W. Conway =

Irish physicist (1875–1950)

Arthur W. Conway FRS PRIA
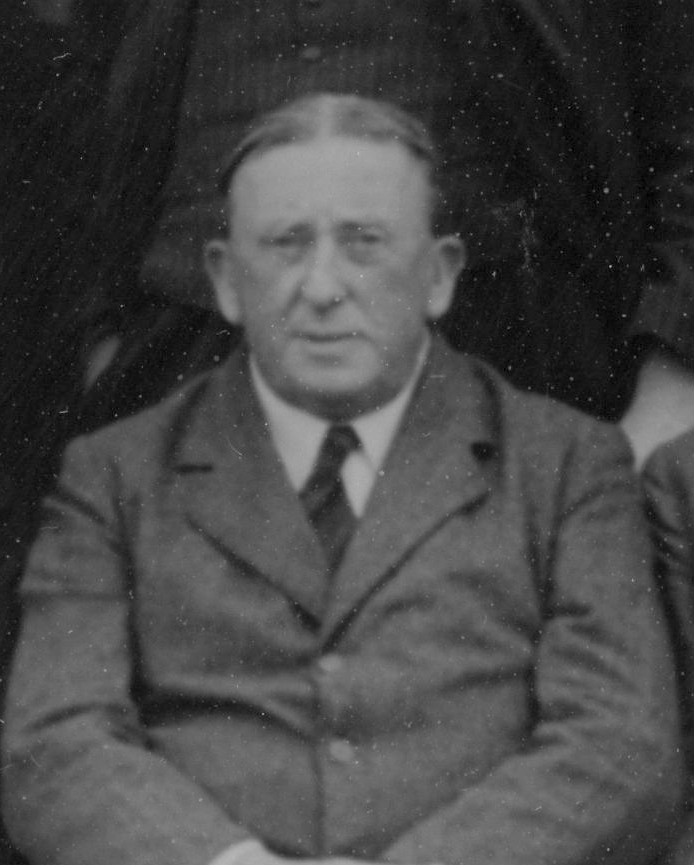
- Arthur W. Conway in 1942 at Dublin Institute for Advanced Studies
- Born: 2 October 1875; Wexford, County Wexford, Ireland
- Died: 11 July 1950 (aged 74)
- Education: St Peter's College, Wexford; University College Dublin; Royal University of Ireland (BA, MA); Corpus Christi College, Oxford
- Known for: Relativity
- Spouse: Agnes Bingham (m. 1903)
- Children: 4
- Awards: Fellow of the Royal Society (1915)
- Scientific career
- Fields: Mathematics; Mathematical physics
- Workplaces: University College Dublin; Maynooth College; Dublin Institute for Advanced Studies
- Doctoral advisor: Augustus Love
- Notable students: Éamon de Valera

Arthur William Conway FRS PRIA (2 October 1875 – 11 July 1950) was a distinguished Irish mathematician and mathematical physicist who wrote one of the first books on relativity and co-edited two volumes of William Rowan Hamilton's collected works. He also served as President of University College Dublin between 1940 and 1947.

== Life and career ==
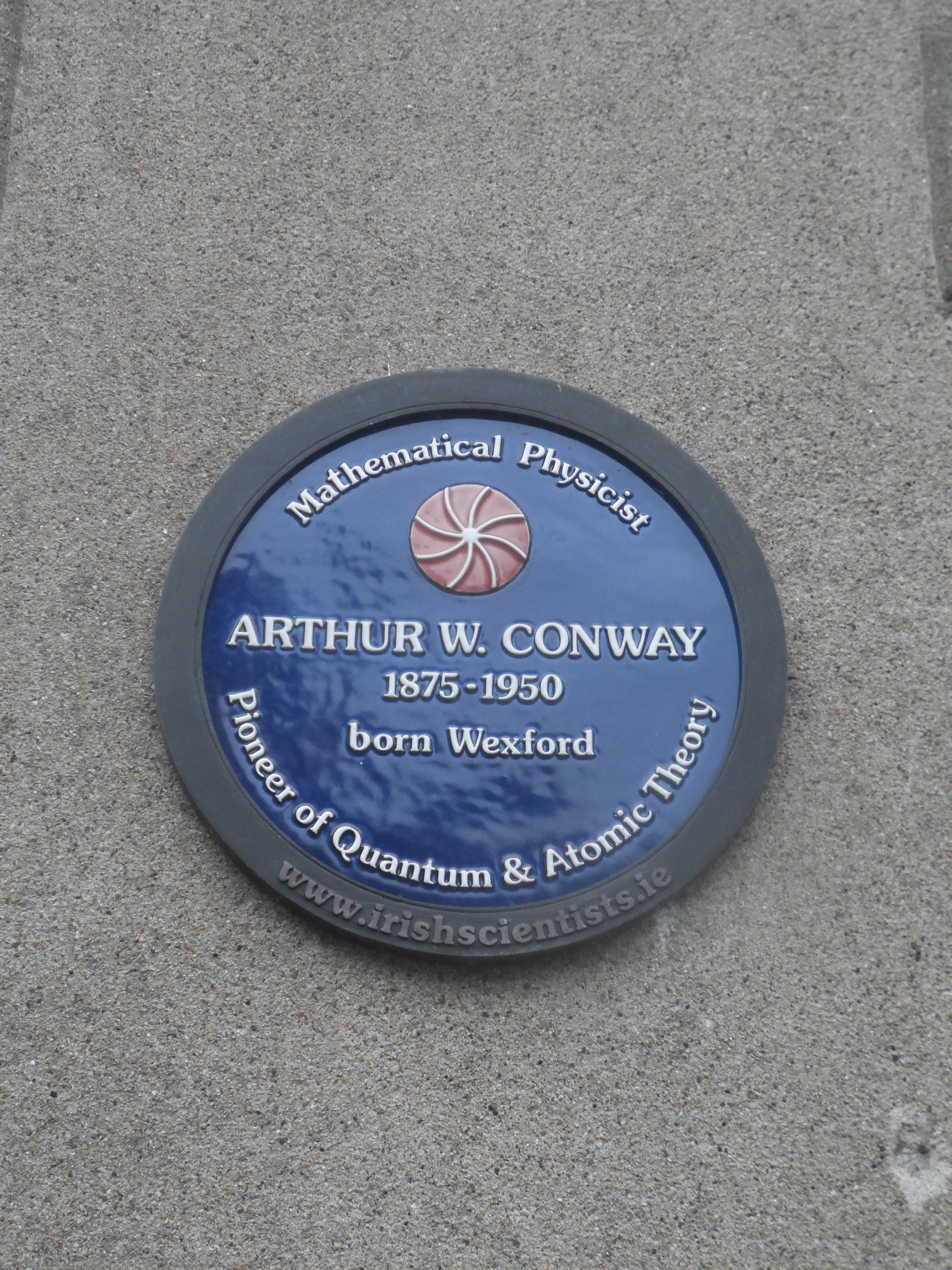
Memorial plaque in Wexford town

Born in Wexford, he received his early education in St Peter's College, Wexford and proceeded to enter old University College, Dublin in 1892. He received his BA degree from the Royal University of Ireland in 1896 with honours in Latin, English, Mathematics and Natural Philosophy. In 1897, he received his MA degree with highest honours in mathematics and proceeded to Corpus Christi College, Oxford, becoming University Scholar there in 1898, and studying under Augustus Love. Also in 1901, he was appointed to the professorship of Mathematical Physics in the old University College Dublin and held the chair until the creation of the new college in 1909 until 1940. He also taught for a short time at St. Patrick's College, Maynooth.

He married Agnes Christina Bingham on 19 August 1903; they had three daughters and one son.

One of Conway's students was Éamon de Valera, whom he introduced to Hamilton's quaternions. De Valera warmed to the subject and engaged in research of this novelty of abstract algebra. Later, when de Valera became Taoiseach (he was also subsequently President of Ireland), he called upon Conway while forming the Dublin Institute for Advanced Studies.

Conway's earliest publications, dating back to 1903, were on the electromagnetic theory. He is remembered for his application of biquaternion algebra to the special theory of relativity, and in 1915 published a 43-page tract "Relativity" in Edinburgh. He published an article in 1911, and in 1912 asserted priority over Ludwik Silberstein, who also applied biquaternions to relativity. This claim was backed up by George Temple in his book 100 Years of Mathematics. In 1947 Conway put quaternions to use with rotations in hyperbolic space. The next year he published quantum mechanics applications which were referred to in a PhD thesis by J. Lambek in 1950.

In 1918, he was the Irish Parliamentary Party candidate in South Londonderry and in the National University, coming second in both.

Arthur Conway continued his scholarship in the fields of mathematics and theoretical physics, and made a special study of William Rowan Hamilton. With J. L. Synge, he edited the first volume of Hamilton's mathematical papers and with A. J. McConnell he edited the second volume of Hamilton's mathematical papers. Conway was also active in college life, being appointed Registrar, a position he occupied until his election as president in 1940. He retired in 1947 from the presidency of UCD. In 1953, some of his writings were edited by J. McConnell for publication by the Dublin Institute for Advanced Studies.

He was an Invited Speaker of the ICM in Toronto in 1924, in 1932 in Zurich, and in 1936 in Oslo. He was elected President of the Royal Irish Academy from 1937 to 1940.

In October 1975, to mark the centenary of his birth, UCD hosted the AC Conway Memorial Mathematical Symposium. Speakers included Roger Penrose, Ian Sneddon, and William B. Bonnor.

In his obituary, E.T. Whittaker referred to Conway as the "most distinguished Irish Catholic man of science of his generation."

== Books ==
- 1915: Relativity, G. Bell & Sons (Edinburgh Mathematical Tracts No. 3) via Internet Archive
- 1931: The Mathematical Papers of Sir William Rowan Hamilton: Volume 1, Geometrical Optics, Cambridge (edited with J L Synge)
- 1940: The Mathematical Papers of Sir William Rowan Hamilton: Volume 2, Dynamics, Cambridge (edited with J L Synge)

Academic offices
Preceded by Denis Coffey	President of the University College Dublin; 1940–1947	Succeeded by Michael Tierney
