= Bill Toner =

Scottish chief executive

Bill Toner MBE
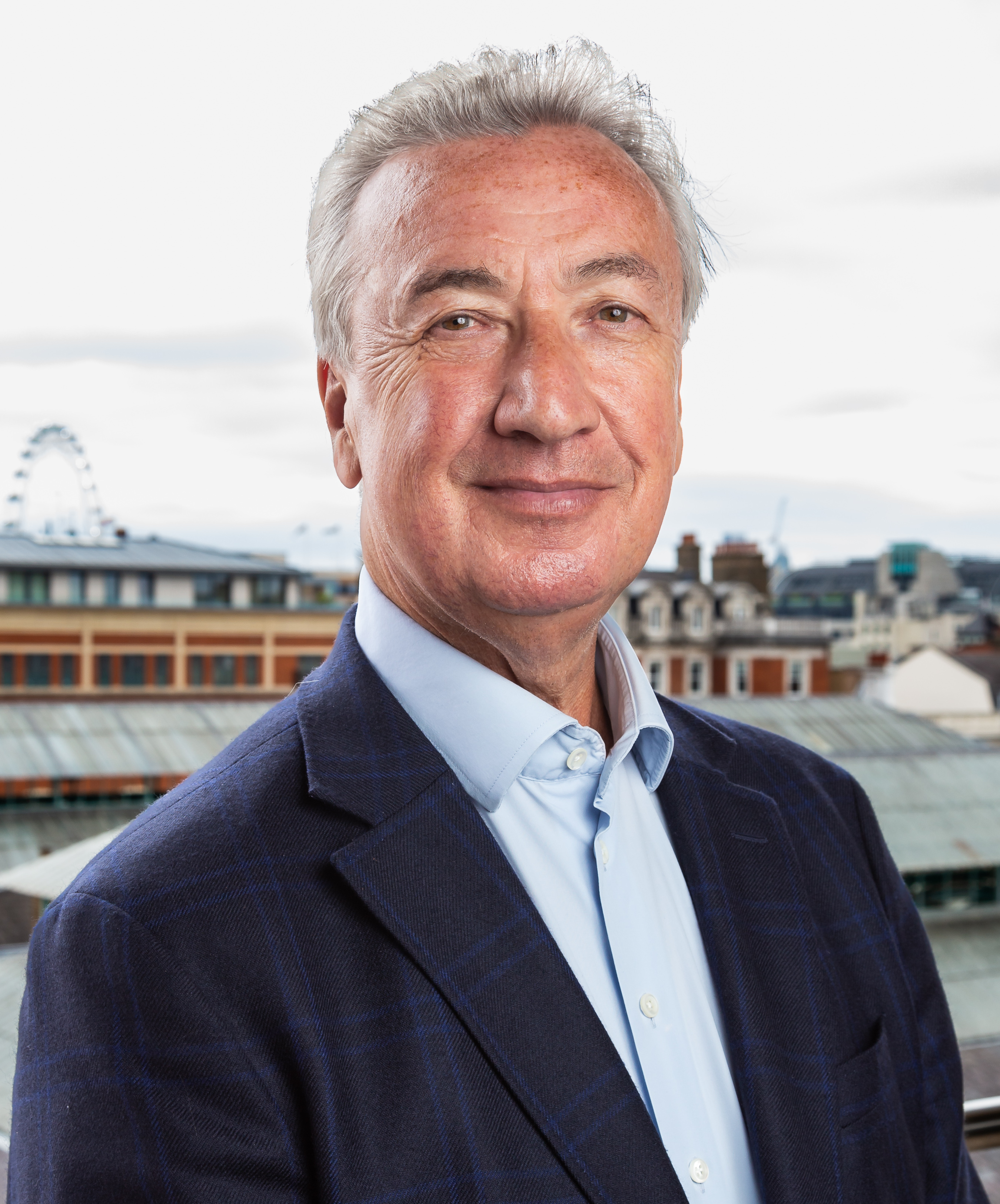
- Toner in 2025
- Born: May 1958 (age 67); West Lothian, Scotland, United Kingdom
- Education: Telford College
- Occupation: Business executive
- Known for: Former CEO of foodservice company CH&CO
- Spouse: Susanne Toner
- Children: 2, (Joanne and Blair)

Bill Toner is a Scottish chief executive in the hospitality industry. He served as the CEO of foodservice company CH&CO from 2015 until it was acquired in 2024.

In 2018, The Caterer ranked Toner in tenth place for its Top 100 list. For the 2023 Catey Awards, Toner received the Lifetime Achievement Award for his work at several caterers. On December 30, 2024, he was named to the King's New Year Honours List 2025 for "services to the hospitality sector" and made an MBE.

== Education ==
Toner was born in West Lothian, Scotland, in 1958 and grew up in a family of five. His father and brothers were coal miners.

In 1977, Toner graduated from Telford College with an Ordinary National Diploma in Hotel Catering & International Management and several City & Guilds culinary courses completed. He was also certified by the Hotel and Catering Institutional Management Association.

== Career ==
Toner began working in the hospitality industry at the age of 14 as a part-time kitchen helper at Bridge Castle Hotel. At the age of 16, he left home and school to live and work there permanently before going to Telford College at the age of 18. He then trained to become a professional chef and worked at restaurants in France and Scotland. At the age of 23, he was offered a sous chef role at a hotel in South Africa, but Susanne, his wife who was pregnant at the time, applied to a job as a catering manager at Royal Bank of Scotland (contracted through Gardner Merchant) on his behalf.

Toner then worked several roles at Gardner Merchant for 18 years, including general manager, district manager, and several director positions. By the time it was sold to Sodexo, he served as its managing director at the age of 36. Afterward, he worked as a chief executive of Aramark starting in 1999, then Host Catermasters Group in 2011, and went through several company mergers and acquisitions before arriving at CH&CO where, as of 2015, Toner has been the CEO.

In 2023, Toner was appointed as a trustee of the Savoy Educational Trust. He also serves as a trustee for industry charities like Hospitality Action and Springboard.
