= William Delany (Jesuit) =

Irish Jesuit priest and educationalist

William Delany, SJ (1835–1924) was an Irish Jesuit priest and educator who served as president of University College Dublin.

== Life ==
Delany was born in 1835 in Leighlinbridge, County Carlow and received his early education in St. Patrick's, Carlow College before going on to Maynooth College he pursued further studies in the Gregorian University, Rome.

In 1856 he entered the Jesuits at St. Acheul, near Amiens in France. He returned to Ireland and taught classics and mathematics at the Jesuit Clongowes Wood College and St Stanislaus College(Tullabeg), and was Rector of Crescent College in Limerick. He returned to the jesuit St Stanislaus College, Tullabeg(Rahan), County Offaly, as master of novices and prepared them for BA examinations to the University of London similar to Carlow and Thurles Seminaries, with the establishment of the Royal University students were prepared for its examinations instead. He became rector of Tullabeg in 1870.

He also served as rector of St. Ignatius' College, Dublin for a year.

In 1883 Delany became the first President of University College Dublin, until 1888 (technically he was the first president of UCD since previously the post was called Rector), and the university flourished under his leadership. After serving as a priest in England he returned again to the role of President of University College, Dublin, serving from 1897 until 1909.

In 1909 he was appointed Provincial of the Society of Jesus (Jesuits) in Ireland, a post he held for three years.

Fr Delany served on the Senate of the Royal University of Ireland from 1885 until its abolition in 1909, and subsequently was on the Senate of its replacement the new National University of Ireland until 1919.

His brother Thomas Delany was also a priest, who supported tenants rights during the Land League campaign.

In 1924 Fr. Delany died in Dublin.

Academic offices
Preceded by None	President of the University College Dublin; 1883–1888	Succeeded by Robert Carbery SJ
Preceded by Robert Carbery SJ	President of the University College Dublin; 1897–1909	Succeeded by Denis Coffey (physician)
