= Battle of Prosperous =

Engagement during 1798 Irish rebellion

- Part of the Irish Rebellion
- Attack on Prosperous by George Cruikshank
Date	24 May 1798
Location	Prosperous, County Kildare 53°17′16″N 6°45′21″W
Result	Irish victory

Belligerents
United Irishmen	Great Britain: (Kingdom of Ireland) British Ireland

Commanders and leaders
John Esmonde	Richard Swayne †

Strength
200	150

Casualties and losses
Unknown, probably few	40-70 killed
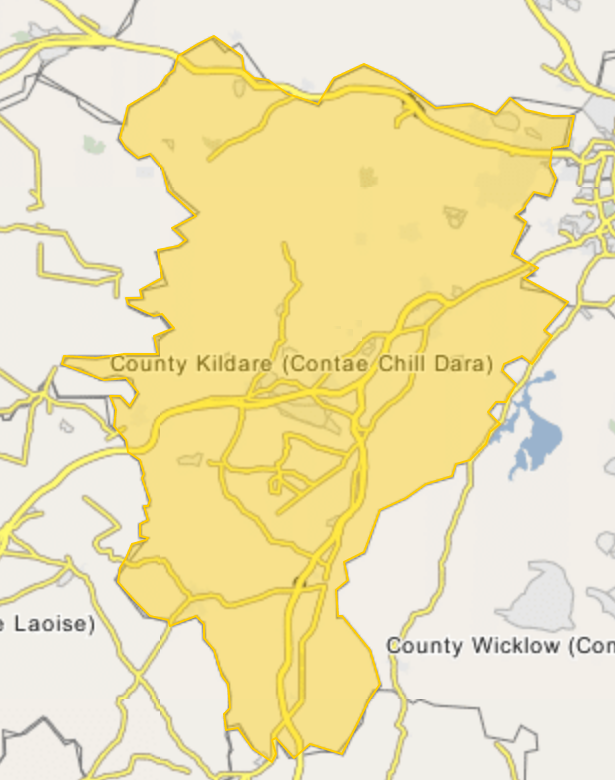
- Location within County Kildare Battle of Prosperous (Ireland)

The Battle of Prosperous was a military engagement between British Crown forces and United Irishmen rebels on 24 May 1798, during that year's Irish Rebellion, in the town of Prosperous, County Kildare.

Prosperous was founded by Sir Robert Brooke in 1780 as a village for processing cotton produced in the Americas.

== Prelude ==
In the days before the rebellion broke out, Prosperous was garrisoned by elements of the Royal Cork City Militia under the command of Captain Richard Swayne. Swayne was later reinforced by detachments of a Welsh mounted fencible regiment, the Ancient British Regiment of Fencible Cavalry Dragoons (also known as the Ancient Britons) bringing the garrison strngth to 150

When a rebellion spearheaded by the United Irishmen broke out against British rule in Ireland, rebel forces led by John Esmonde made plans to capture Prosperous.

== Attack ==
After darkness fell on 24 May 1798, a small rebel vanguard infiltrated the town and with the possible help of sympathetic female residents, scaled the walls of the town's barracks, killed the sentries and opening the town gates. The barracks were quickly surrounded and an attempt by the garrison to break out was beaten back. Most of the off-guard garrison were trapped in the upper floors of the barracks which was set on fire by the rebels, causing some to jump in desperation from the windows to the ground below, where they were summarily executed with pikes.

== Aftermath ==
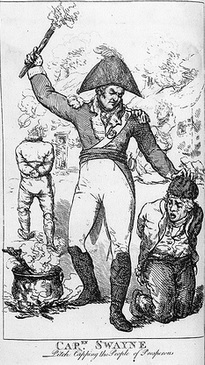
Captain Swayne pitchcapping the people of Prosperous

The rebels lost two or three in the attack with around 40 members of the garrison being killed, though the commander of the Clane yeomanry, Richard Griffith, reported the loss of 50 militia and 20 Ancient Britons in the battle

Ten members of the garrison, all belonging to the Ancient Britons, managed to escape from Prosperous to Dunlavin, County Wicklow, where they participated in the Dunlavin Green executions on 26 May. Esmonde, who had previously enlisted in the Clane Yeomanry as their first-lieutenant, returned to his regular unit hoping to gain intelligence, but was betrayed by his aide, captured and brought to Dublin for trial.He was court-martialled on 13 June and found guilty of being a deserter. Esmonde was executed by hanging on 14 June at on Carlisle Bridge with his yeoman's coat being worn reversed to indicate that he was convicted of desertion. Prosperous remained under the control of the United Irishmen until 19 June, when a detachment of the 5th Dragoon Guards under the command of Lieutenant-Colonel Stewart recaptured the town.
