= Clongowes Wood College =

Boarding school in Clane, County Kildare, Ireland

Clongowes Wood College S.J.

Location
- Clane, County Kildare; Ireland; 53°18′39.3″N 6°41′0.4″W

Information
- Type: Voluntary boarding school
- Motto: Aeterna Non Caduca (The Eternal not the Passing)
- Religious affiliations: Roman Catholic; Society of Jesus
- Established: 1814; 212 years ago
- Founder: Peter Kenney
- Rector: Michael Sheil
- Headmaster: Chris Lumb
- Gender: Boys
- Age: 12 to 18
- Enrolment: 421 (2026)
- Campus size: 1100 Acres
- Houses: Arrupe, Collins, Claver, Gonzaga, Hopkins, Kenney, Kostka, Loyola, Sullivan, Xavier
- Colours: Purple and white
- Publication: The Clongownian
- Yearbook: The Clongownian
- School fees: information available upon enquiry
- Affiliation: Society of Jesus
- Alumni: Old Clongownians
- Website: www.clongowes.net
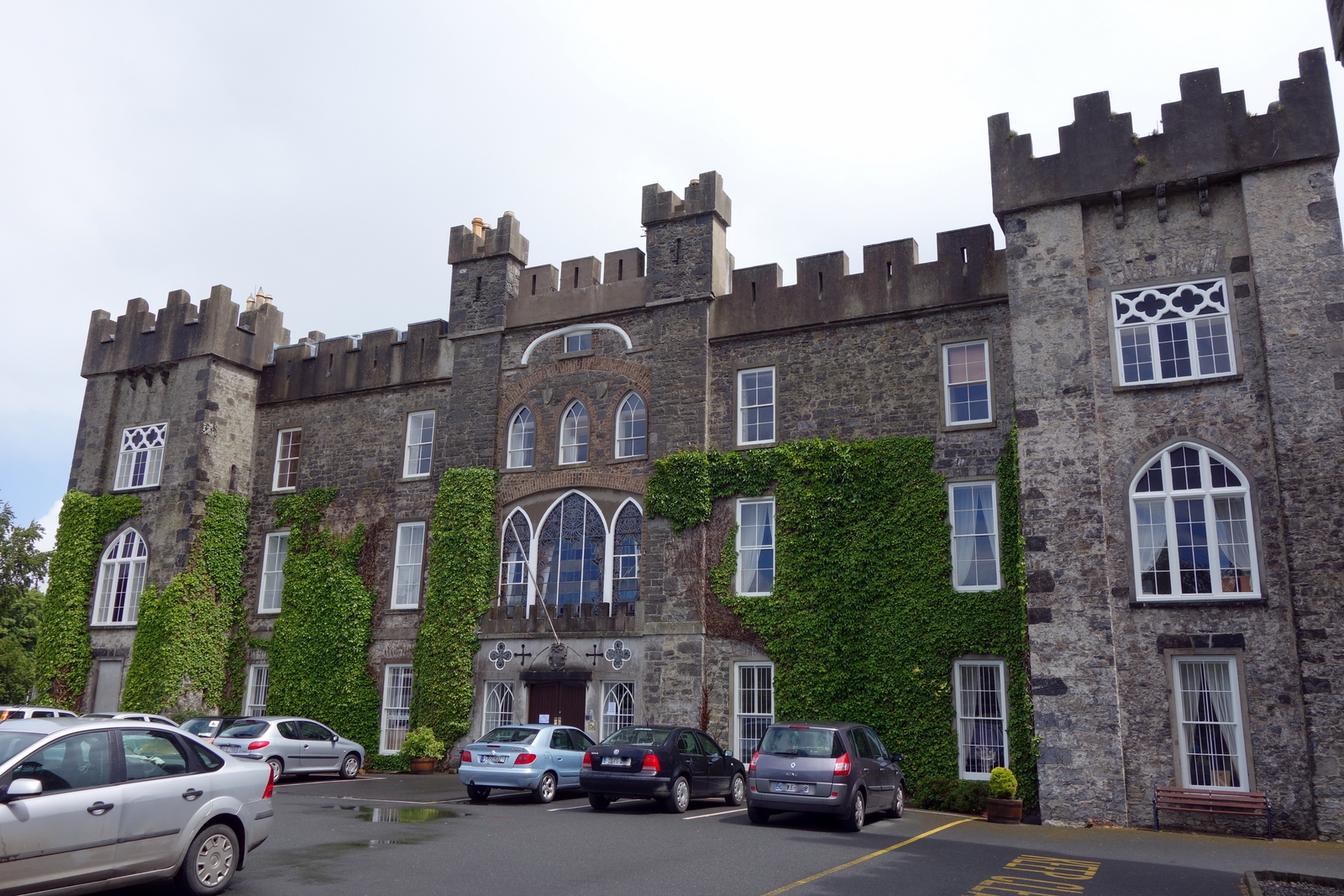

Clongowes Wood College SJ is a Catholic voluntary boarding school for boys near Clane, County Kildare, Ireland, founded by the Jesuits in 1814. It features prominently in James Joyce's semi-autobiographical novel A Portrait of the Artist as a Young Man. Blessed John Sullivan (Jesuit) taught at Clongowes Wood College from 1907 until his death in 1933. One of five Jesuit secondary schools in Ireland, it had 450 students in 2019.

The school's current headmaster, Christopher Lumb, is the first lay headmaster in its history.

The school is also a member of the Headmasters' and Headmistresses' Conference being one of only three members based in Ireland.

== School ==
The school is a secondary boarding school for boys from Ireland and other parts of the world. The school is divided into three groups, known as "lines". The Third Line is for first and second year students, the Lower Line for third and fourth years, and the Higher Line for fifth and sixth years. Each year is known by a name, drawn from the Jesuit Ratio Studiorum: Elements (first year), Rudiments (second), Grammar (third), Syntax (fourth), Poetry (fifth), and Rhetoric (sixth).

== Buildings ==
The medieval castle was originally built in the 13th century by John de Hereford, an early Anglo-Norman warrior and landowner in North Kildare. He had been given extensive lands in the area of Kill, Celbridge and Mainham by his brother, Adam de Hereford, who had come to Ireland with 'Strongbow', the Earl of Pembroke.

The castle is the residence of the religious community and was improved by a "chocolate box" type restoration in the 18th century. It was rebuilt in 1718 by Stephen Fitzwilliam Browne and extended in 1788 by Thomas Wogan Browne. It is situated beside a ditch and wall—known as ramparts—constructed for the defence of the Pale in the 14th century. The building was completely refurbished in 2004 and the reception area was moved back there from the "1999 building."

The castle is connected to the modern buildings by an elevated corridor hung with portraits, the Serpentine Gallery referred to by James Joyce. This gallery was completely demolished and rebuilt in 2004 as part of a redevelopment programme for the school buildings.

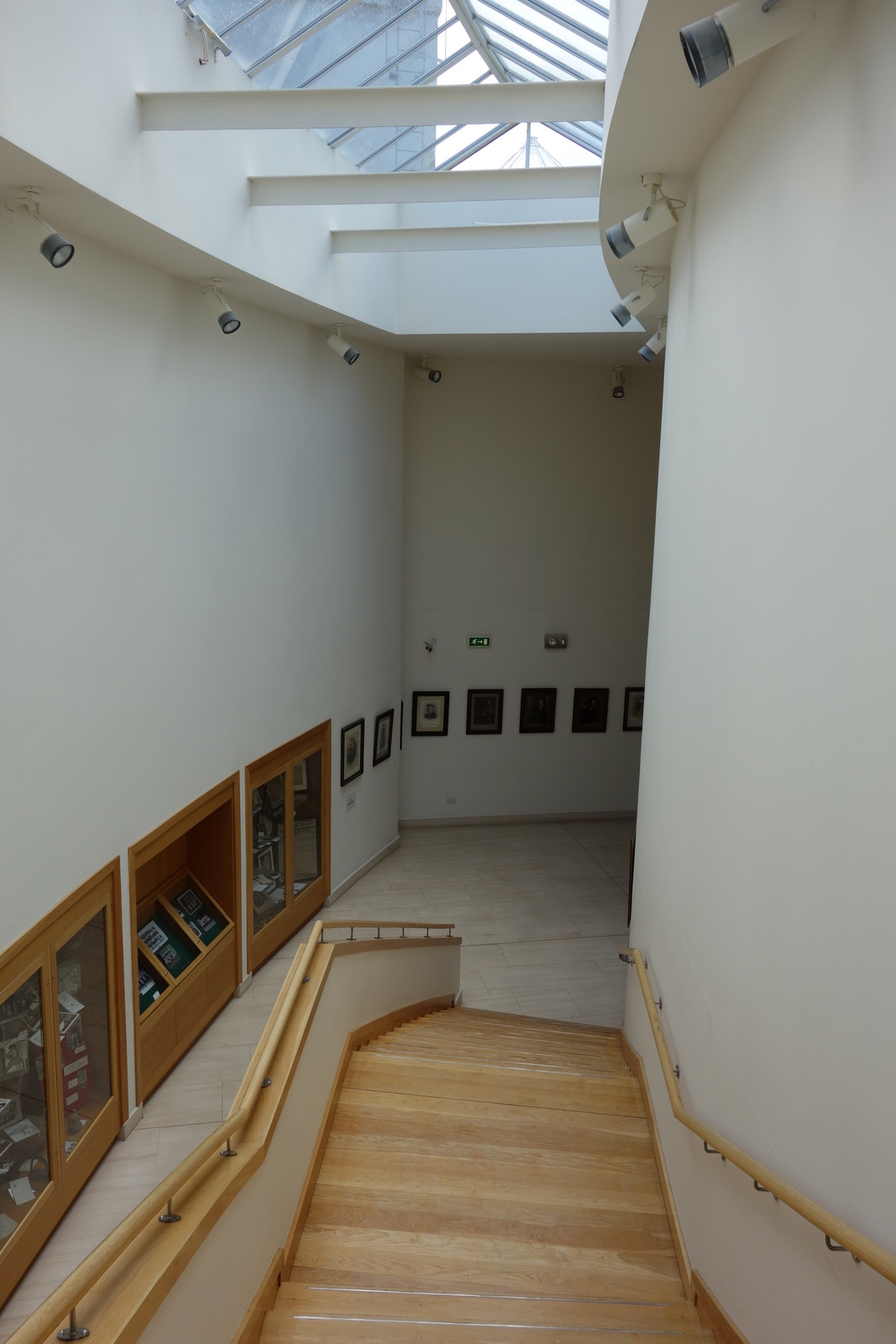
The Serpentine Gallery – a portrait corridor connecting Clongowes castle to modern buildings

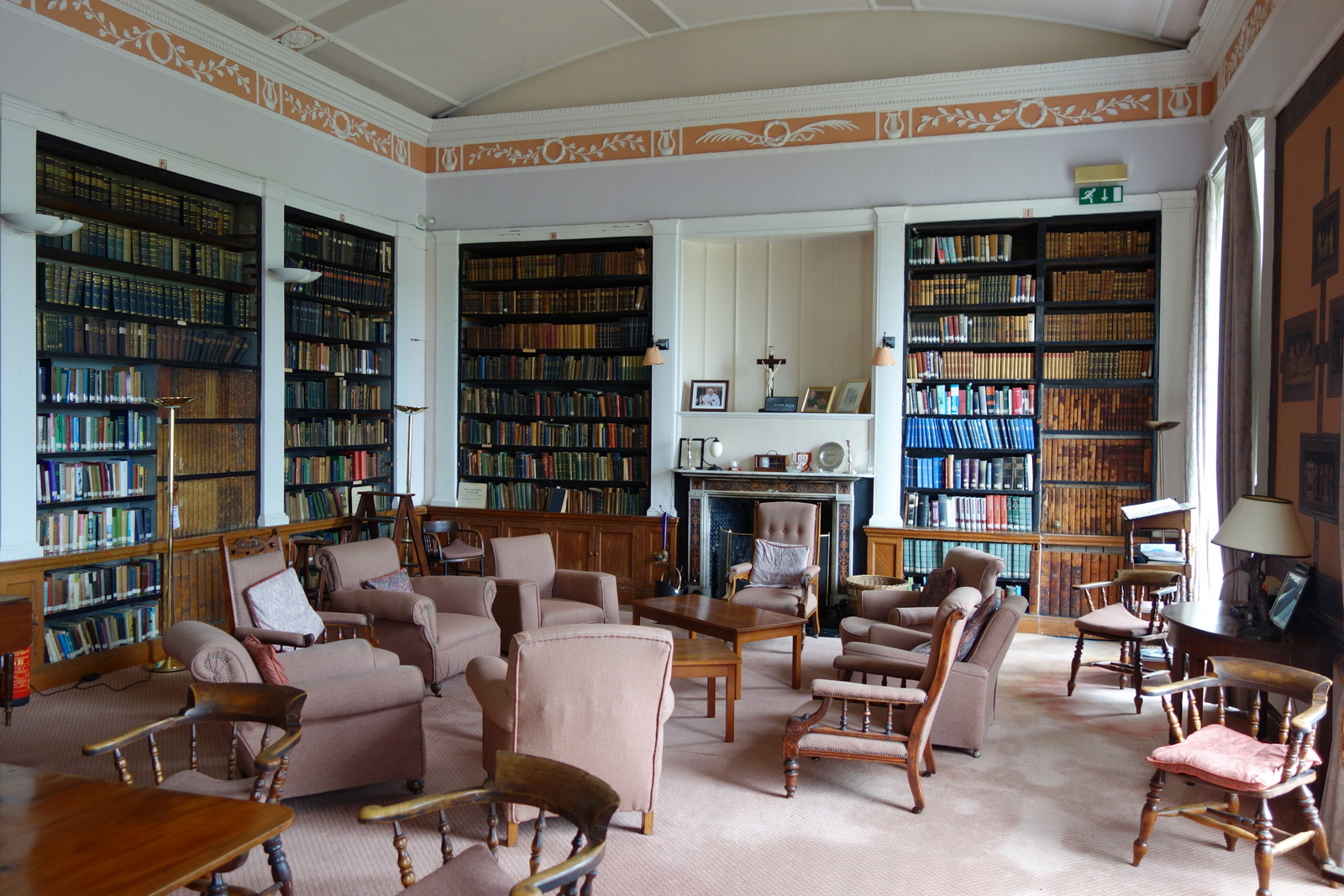
The Jesuit Community Library at Clongowes Wood College SJ

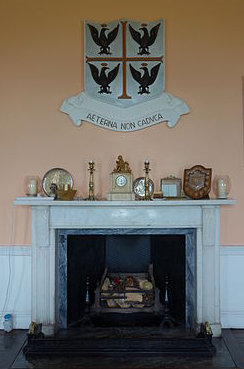
The college coat of arms in the Community Reception Room at Clongowes Wood College SJ

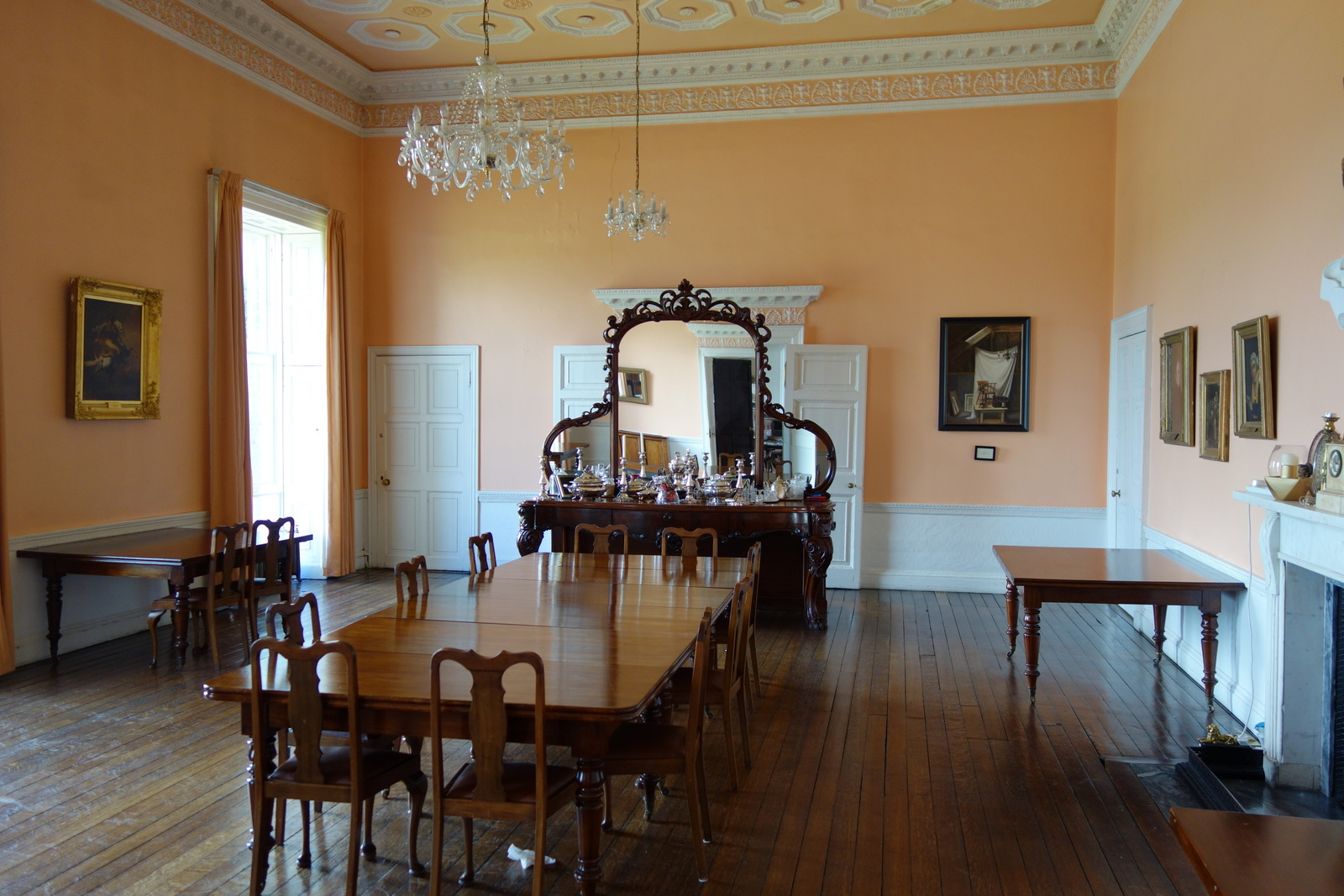
The Jesuit Community Reception Room at Clongowes Wood College SJ

In 1929, another wing was built at a cost of £135,000, presenting the rear façade of the school. It houses the main classrooms and the Elements, Rudiments, Grammar and Syntax dormitories.

An expansion and modernisation was completed in 2000; the €4.8m project added another residential wing that included a 500-seat dining hall, kitchen, entrance hall, offices, and study/bedrooms for sixth year ("Rhetoric") students.

The Boys' Chapel has an elaborate reredos, a large pipe organ in the gallery, and a sequence of Stations of the Cross painted by Sean Keating. School tradition has it that the portrait of Pontius Pilate in the 12th station was based on the school rector, who had refused to pay the artist his asking price.

The moat that outlines the nearby forest of the college is the old border of The Pale, with the Wogan-Browne castle (now the residence of the Jesuit community) landmarking its edge.

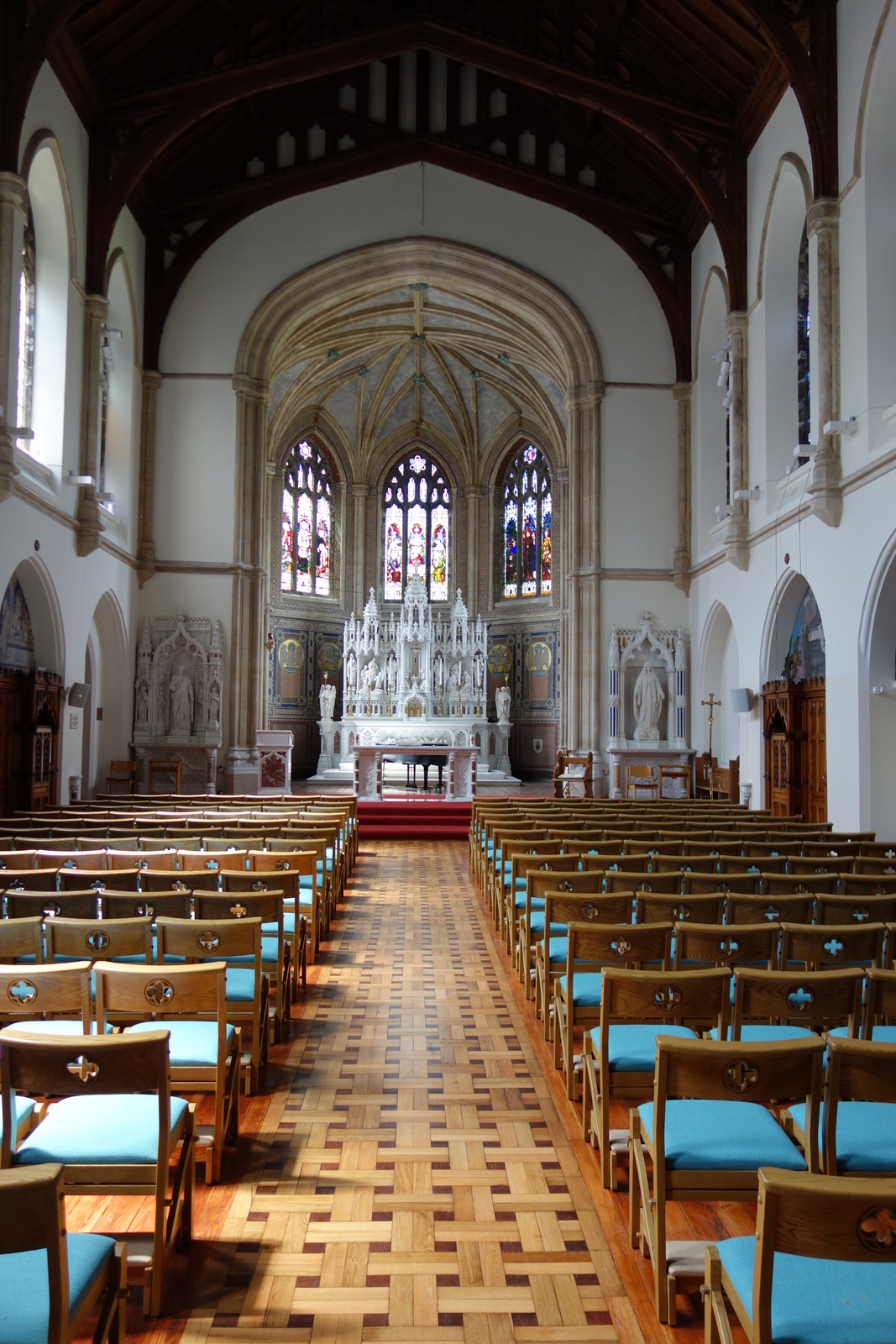
The Boys' Chapel at Clongowes Wood College SJ

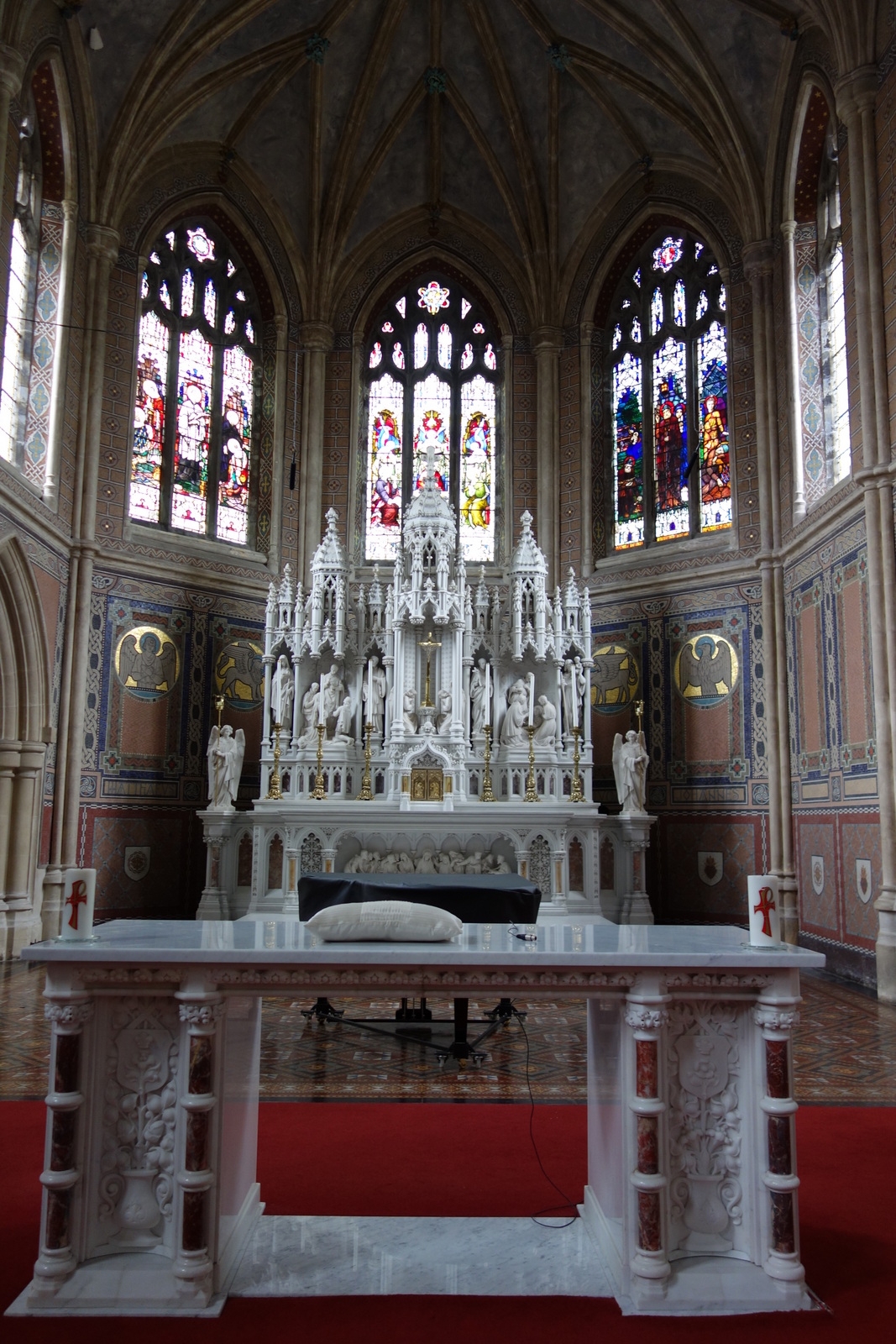
The altar in the Boys' Chapel at Clongowes

== History ==
The school traces its history back to a 799-acre (3.23 km^{2}) estate owned by the Wogan family in 1418 under the reign of Henry IV. The name "Clongowes" comes from the Irish for "meadow" (cluain) and for "blacksmith" (gobha). The estate was originally known as "Clongowes de Silva" (de Silva meaning "of the wood" in Latin). The estate later passed to the Eustace family and became part of the fortified border of the Pale in 1494. The Eustaces lost their estates during the Restoration (1660). The estate was sold by the Wogan-Brownes to the Jesuits in March 1814 for £16,000.

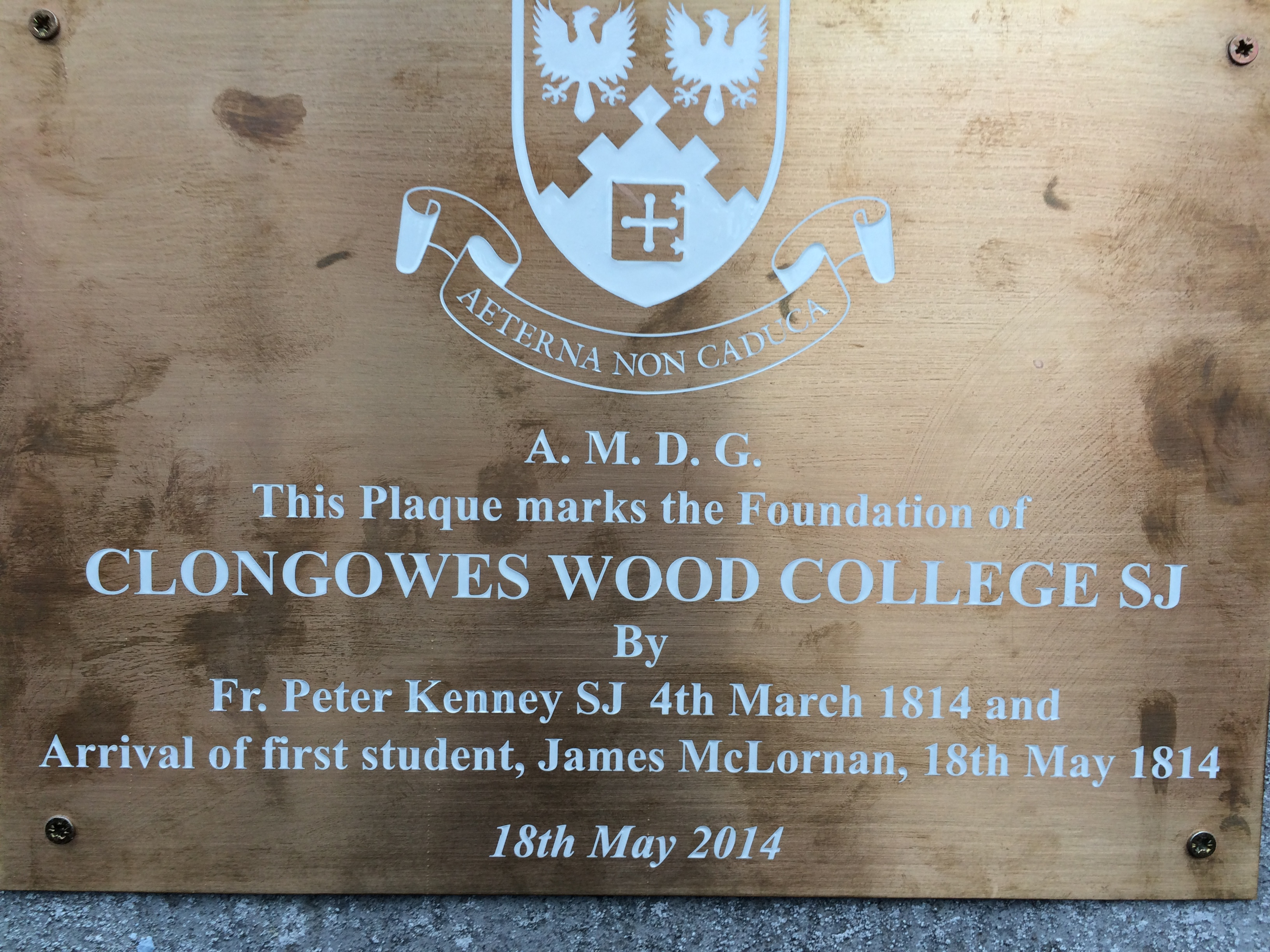
Plaque outside reception, commemorating its 1st pupil James McLornan on 18 May 1814

The school accepted its first pupil, James McLornan, on 18 May 1814.

In 1886, the Jesuit-run St Stanislaus College in Tullabeg, County Offaly, was amalgamated with Clongowes Wood College.

Joseph Dargan served as rector in the 1970s. Leonard Moloney was the headmaster from 2004 to 2015. Michael Sheil retired as rector in 2006 and Bruce Bradley (headmaster 1992–2000) was his successor. In September 2011 Michael Sheil returned as rector.

As of 2021, there are four Jesuits living at the school, two priests and two brothers.

Clongowes is also part of an initiative to ease religious tensions in Turkey, currently being headed by Alan McGuckian (former teacher in Clongowes, now Bishop of Down and Connor, in Northern Ireland) in Istanbul.

=== Prefect of Studies/Headmaster ===
- Fr. Francis Mahony
- Fr. John Conmee (1883–1887)
- Fr. James Daly (1887–1916)
- Fr. Larry Kieran (1917–1925)
- Fr. Mathias Bodkin (1933–1937)
- Fr. Brian McMahon (1944–1947)
- Fr. Hilary Lawton (1948–1959)
- Fr. Raymond J Lawler (1959–1962)
- Fr. Joseph Marmion (1962–1965)
- Fr. Paddy Crowe (1971–1976)
- Fr. Philip Fogarty (1976–1987)
- Fr. Liam O'Connell (1987–1992)
- Fr. Bruce Bradley (1992–2000)
- Fr. Dermot Murray (2000–2004)
- Fr. Leonard Moloney (2004–2015)
- Chris Lumb (2015–present)

=== Rectors ===
- Fr. Peter Kenney (1814–17) – founder of the college
- Fr. Charles Aylmer (1817–20)– took out lease of land for Tullabeg College
- Fr. Bartholomew Esmonde (1820–21)
- Fr. Peter Kenney (1821–30)
- Fr. Bartholomew Esmonde (1830–36)
- Fr. Robert Haly (1836–41)
- Fr. Robert St. Leger (1841–42)
- Fr. Robert Haly (1842–50)
- Fr. Michael Kavanagh (1850–1855)
- Fr. Joseph Lentaigne (1855–58)
- Fr. John McDonald (1858–60)
- Fr. Eugene Browne (1860–1870)
- Fr. Robert Carbery (1870–1876)
- Fr. Thomas Keating (1876–81)
- Fr. Edward Kelly (1881–85)
- Fr. John Conmee (1885–91)
- Fr. Matthew Devitt (1891–1900)
- Fr. Michael Browne (1900)
- Fr. James Brennan (1900–04)
- Fr. Vincent Byrne (1904–07)
- Fr. Matthew Devitt (1907–08)
- Fr. Thomas Nolan (1908–12)
- Fr. Nicholas Tomkin (1912-19)
- Fr. Charles Mulcahy (1919–1922)
- Fr. John Joy (1922–27)
- Fr. George Roche (1927–33)
- Fr. Hilary Lawton (1959–65)
- Fr. Frank Joy (1965–68)
- Fr. Paddy Crowe (1968–71)
- Fr. Jack Brennan (1972–77)
- Fr. Joseph Dargan (1977–1979)
- Fr. Paddy Carberry (1980–1983)
- Fr. Kieran Hanley (1983–89)
- Fr. Patrick Crowe (1992–95)
- Fr. Dermot Murray (1995–2000)
- Fr. Michael Sheil (2000–06)
- Fr. Bruce Bradley (2006–11)
- Fr. Michael Sheil (2011–present)

== Historical accounts ==
One early history of the school is The Clongowes Record 1814–1932 by Timothy Corcoran (Browne and Nolan, Dublin, 1932). A half-century later, a history was written by Fr. Roland Burke Savage, SJ and published in The Clongownian school magazine during the 1980s; that same decade, Peter Costello wrote Clongowes Wood: a History of Clongowes Wood College 1814–1989, published by Gill and Macmillan, Dublin, 1989).

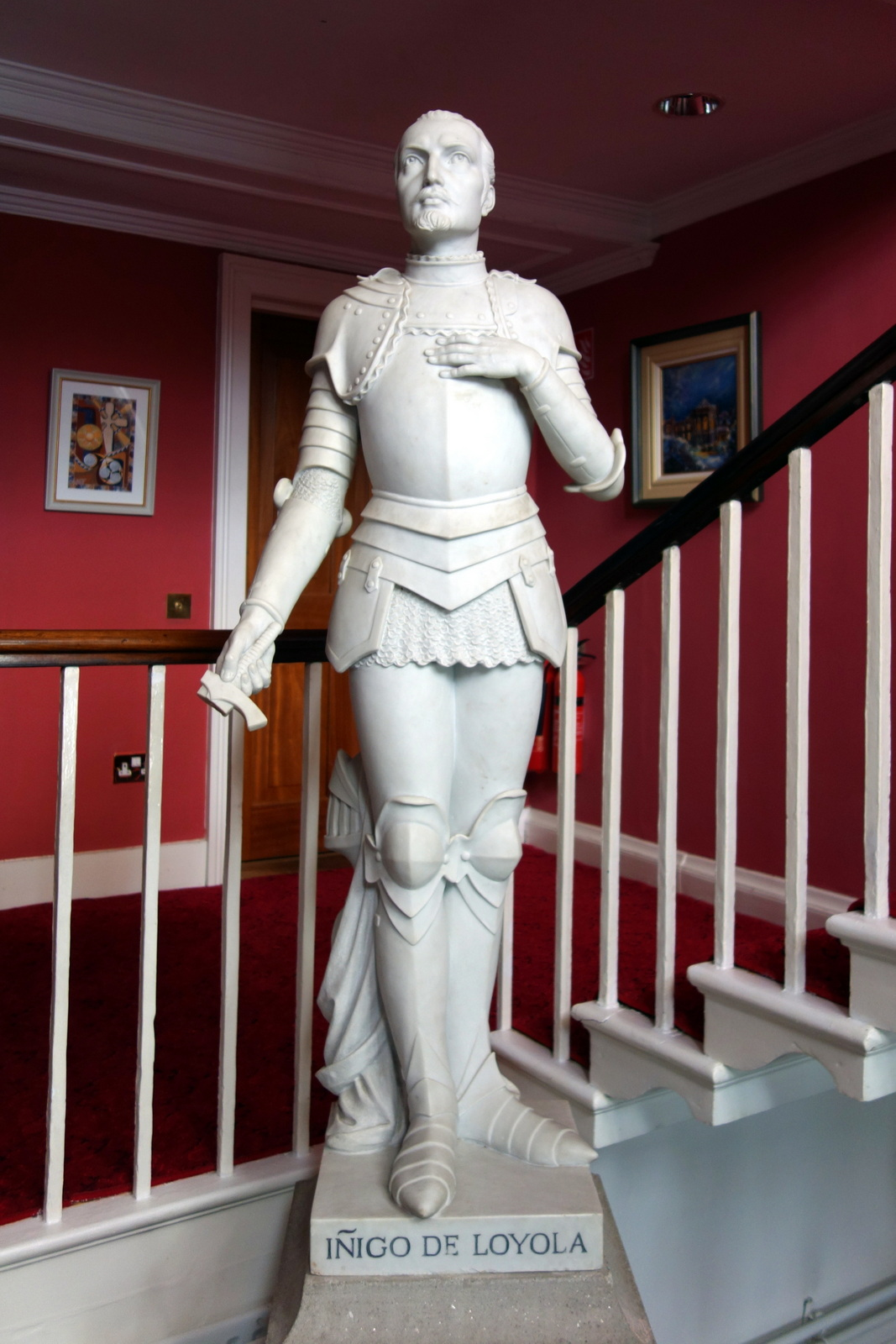
Statue of Ignatius of Loyola in reception area

== Sport ==
Clongowes is known for its strong pedigree in rugby union. Despite a relatively small size, Clongowes has won the Leinster Schools Rugby Senior Cup nine times, winning its first final in 1926. Following this, there was a gap of 52 years until the next title in 1978. Beginning with a 3rd title in 1988 and up until 2011, Clongowes has appeared in 13 finals, more than any other school in the competition during this period. Clongowes secured a first set of back-to-back titles with wins in 2010 and 2011 before being awarded a joint title in the 2020 season which was cut short because of the COVID-19 pandemic.

== Cultural associations ==
The school featured prominently in James Joyce's semi-autobiographical novel A Portrait of the Artist as a Young Man. A documentary depicting a year in the life in the school was screened in 2001 as part of RTÉ's True Lives series. The popular fictional series of Ross O'Carroll Kelly has mentioned Clongowes Wood on a number of occasions in the book and Irish Times column.

== Notable alumni ==
=== Arts and media ===
- Peter Campion — actor
- Maurice Healy (writer) — author
- Nick Hewer — public relations expert
- Aidan Higgins — writer
- James Joyce — writer
- Francis Sylvester Mahony — 19th-century humorist known by the pen name "Father Prout"
- Paul McGuinness — former business manager for the Irish rock band U2
- David McSavage — comedian, writer and producer of The Savage Eye
- Charles Mitchel — RTÉ's first newsreader
- Micheal O'Siadhail — Irish poet
- Kieran Prendiville — television writer and producer
- John Ryan — artist, broadcaster, publisher, critic, editor, patron and publican
- Sydney Bernard Smith — poet, author, actor, and dramatist
- Patrick James Smyth — journalist
- J. T. Walsh — film actor

=== Law ===
- Sir Donnell Deeny — judge in the High Court of Northern Ireland, pro-Chancellor of the University of Dublin
- Nial Fennelly — judge of the Supreme Court of Ireland, former Advocate General of the European Court of Justice
- Thomas Finlay — former Irish Fine Gael politician and Chief Justice of the Supreme Court of Ireland
- James FitzGerald-Kenney — Irish politician, former Minister for Justice
- Raymond Groarke — president of the Circuit Court
- Alan Mahon — judge of the Court of Appeal (Ireland)
- James Patrick Mahon — known as the O'Gorman Mahon, journalist, barrister, parliamentarian
- Niall McCarthy (judge) — Justice of the Supreme Court of Ireland
- Tom O'Higgins — former Chief Justice of Ireland, former Minister for Health, judge of the European Court of Justice
- Daniel O'Keeffe — chairperson of the Standards in Public Office Commission, former judge of the High Court
- Alexander Owens — judge in the High Court of Ireland, judge in the Special Criminal Court
- Christopher Palles — the most eminent Irish judge of his time
- Sir John Joseph Sheil PC — Lord Justice of Appeal in Northern Ireland
- James John Skinner — first Minister of Justice of the Republic of Zambia and former Chief Justice of Malawi

=== Politics and diplomacy ===
- Frederick Boland — first Irish ambassador to the United Kingdom and to the United Nations, chancellor of the University of Dublin
- John Bruton — former Taoiseach of Ireland
- Richard Bruton — Minister for Jobs, Enterprise and Innovation
- Simon Coveney — former Tánaiste and Irish Minister for Foreign Affairs
- Edmund Dwyer-Gray, 29th Premier of Tasmania
- Andrew Kettle — Irish nationalist politician and founder member of the Irish Land League
- Tom Kettle — Irish journalist, barrister, writer, poet, soldier, economist and Home Rule politician
- Sir Gilbert Laithwaite — former British ambassador to Ireland and High Commissioner to Pakistan
- Patrick Little — Irish Fianna Fáil politician and government minister, most notably as the country's longest-serving Minister for Posts & Telegraphs
- Enoch Louis Lowe — 33rd Governor of the US state of Maryland
- Patrick McGilligan — former Irish Minister for Industry and Commerce
- Thomas Francis Meagher — Irish nationalist and leader of the Young Irelanders
- Purcell O'Gorman — soldier and Home Rule League politician
- Kevin O'Higgins — former Irish Vice-president of the Executive Council and Minister for Justice
- Michael O'Higgins — former Fine Gael TD and leader of the Seanad
- Donogh O'Malley — former Irish Minister for Health and Minister for Education
- James O'Mara — nationalist leader and key member of the First Dáil
- The O'Rahilly — Irish Volunteer, killed in the Easter Rising
- John M. O'Sullivan — Cumann na nGaedheal politician, cabinet minister and academic
- Cornelius James Pelly — Irish diplomat
- John Redmond — Irish nationalist politician, barrister, MP in the House of Commons of the United Kingdom of Great Britain and Ireland and leader of the Irish Parliamentary Party from 1900 to 1918

=== Military ===
- Francis Clery — British Army General who commanded 2nd Division during the Second Boer War
- Eugene Esmonde — Second World War pilot and posthumous recipient of the Victoria Cross
- Aidan MacCarthy — Air Commodore RAF, doctor, author of 'A Doctor's War'
- Pat Reid — British Army officer who escaped from Colditz, noted nonfiction and historical author

=== Religion ===
- James Corboy SJ — first Roman Catholic Bishop of Monze, Zambia (1962-1992), rector of Milltown (1959-1962)
- Joseph Dalton — Jesuit who founded a number of schools and churches in Australia
- John Charles McQuaid — Catholic Archbishop of Dublin and Primate of Ireland between 1940 and 1972
- The O'Conor Don — Charles O'Conor
- Patrick Finbar Ryan, O.P., (1881-1975) — Dominican priest, served as Archbishop of Port of Spain, Trinidad (1940–1966)

=== Science and medicine ===
- Francis Cruise (surgeon) — Irish surgeon and urologist best known for inventing an endoscope
- Daniel Joseph Kelly O'Connell — SJ, Jesuit, astronomer and seismologist, director of Riverview and the Vatican Observatory, president of the Pontifical Academy of Sciences(1968-72), the O'Connell effect named after him
- Oliver St John Gogarty — surgeon, writer, critic, and inspiration for Buck Mulligan in James Joyce's Ulysses
- James Bayley Butler — academic biologist and zoologist

=== Business ===
- Aidan Heavey — CEO of Tullow Oil
- Barry O'Callaghan — chairman and CEO of Houghton Mifflin Harcourt, and the chairman of Education Media & Publishing Group
- Michael O'Leary — CEO of Ryanair
- Tony O'Reilly, Junior — Irish businessman
- Michael Smurfit — businessman, former CEO of Jefferson Smurfit Group

=== Sports ===
- Tadhg Beirne — Irish rugby union international, British & Irish Lion #838, Munster rugby player
- Brian Carney — Irish rugby league player
- Will Connors — Irish rugby union international, Leinster Rugby player and former Ireland sevens player
- Thomas Crean — Irish rugby union player, British & Irish Lion #53, British Army soldier and doctor, Awarded the V.C.
- Gordon D'Arcy — Irish rugby union international, British & Irish Lion #720, Leinster rugby player
- Ted Durcan — Champion Flat Jockey, winner of multiple global classic races
- Paddy Hopkirk — international rally driver, winner of Monte Carlo Rally
- David Kearney — Irish rugby union international, Leinster rugby player
- Rob Kearney — Irish rugby union international, British & Irish Lion #766, Leinster rugby player
- James Magee — Irish cricketer and rugby union player, British & Irish Lion #56
- Fergus McFadden — Irish rugby union international, Leinster rugby player
- Max McFarland — Scotland rugby sevens international
- Noel Purcell — Irish rugby union player, Irish & GB water polo Olympian, the first man to have represented two countries at the Olympics
- Patrick Quinlan — Australian cricketer and lawyer
- Arthur Robinson — Irish first-class cricketer
- Dan Sheehan — Irish rugby union international, Leinster rugby player

== Partner schools ==
- Aloisiuskolleg, Jesuit boarding school in Bonn-Bad Godesberg, Germany
- Collegium Augustinianum Gaesdonck, boarding school in Goch, Germany
- Enniskillen Royal Grammar School, voluntary grammar school in Enniskillen, County Fermanagh
- Kolleg St. Blasien, Jesuit boarding school in St. Blasien, Germany
- Saint Ignatius' College, Riverview, Jesuit boarding school in Sydney, Australia
- Passy-Buzenval, Catholic private school, Paris, France
- St Joseph's College, Hunters Hill, Marist Brothers boarding school in Sydney, Australia
- St Aloysius' College (Sydney), Jesuit Day School in Sydney, Australia

== See also ==
- List of Jesuit schools
- List of Jesuit sites in Ireland
- List of alumni of Jesuit educational institutions
- Our Lady's Children's Hospital, Crumlin
