= Edmund O'Reilly (theologian) =

Irish Catholic theologian

The Reverend Father Edmund O'Reilly

Orders
- Ordination: 1838

Personal details
- Born: 30 April 1811 London, England, United Kingdom
- Died: 10 November 1878 (aged 67) Dublin, Ireland, United Kingdom
- Denomination: Roman Catholic
- Profession: Priest and theologian
- Education: Roman College, Rome, Papal States

Ordination history of Edmund O'Reilly
History
Priestly ordination
- Date: 1838

Edmund James O'Reilly SJ (30 April 1811 – 10 November 1878) was an Irish Jesuit Catholic theologian.

== Biography ==
Edmund James O'Reilly was born in London, England, United Kingdom of Great Britain and Ireland, on 30 April 1811. He was educated at Clongowes and Maynooth and studied theology for seven years in the Roman College in Rome. He then gained the decree of Doctor of Divinity by a "public act" de iniversa theologia.

He was ordained a priest in 1838. He taught theology for 13 years at Maynooth College. He entered the Jesuit novitiate at Naples, Italy. He taught theology for several years at Saint Beuno's College in North Wales.

O'Reilly was named Professor of Theology at the Catholic University of Ireland in Dublin on its foundation. Father Peter Jan Beckx, Superior-General of the Society of Jesus, proposed to appoint O'Reilly as Professor of Theology at the Roman College. However, circumstances, which were unrelated to O'Reilly, prevent the appointment. O'Reilly was the Rector of a house of spiritual exercises at Milltown Park near Dublin, and Provincial of Ireland from 1863 to 1870.

At a conference held regarding the philosophical and theological studies in the Society of Jesus, O'Reilly was chosen to represent all the English-speaking "provinces" of the Society (Ireland, England, Maryland, and the other divisions of the United States).

He was constantly consulted on theological questions by the bishops and priests of Ireland. These bishops chose O'Reilly as their theologian: Cardinal Paul Cullen, then Bishop of Armagh, at the Synod of Thurles in 1850; Doctor James Brown, Bishop of Shrewsbury, at the Synod of Shrewsbury; and Doctor Thomas Furlong, Bishop of Ferns and O'Reilly's former colleague as Professor of Theology at Maynooth, at the Synod of Maynooth.

Cardinal John Henry Newman in his famous Letter to the Duke of Norfolk calls O'Reilly "a great authority" and "one of the first theologians of the day".

O'Reilly's chief work was The Relations of the Church to Society.

He died in Dublin on 10 November 1878.
