= Chris O'Malley =

Irish former politician (born 1959)

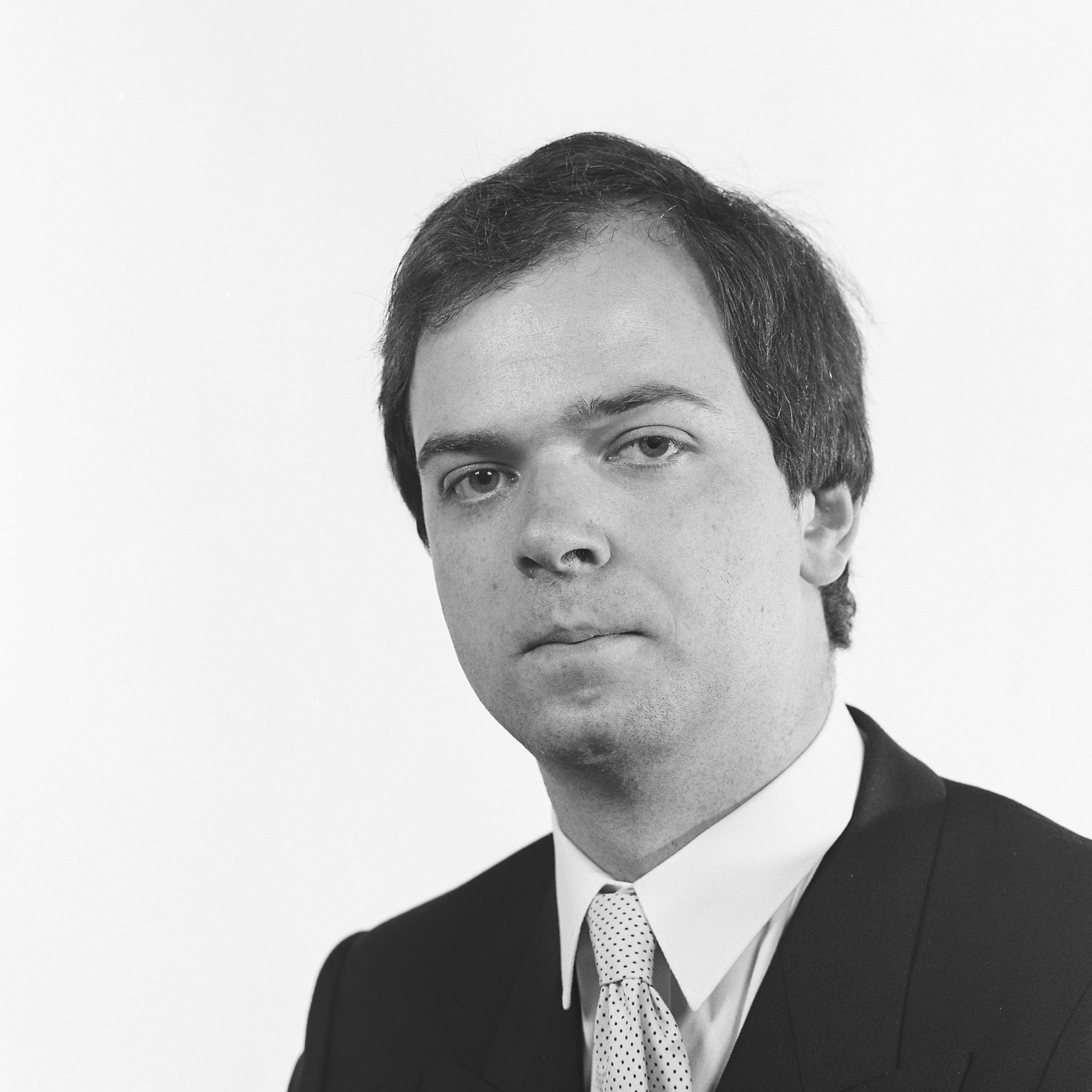
- O'Malley in 1986

Member of the European Parliament
- In office 5 January 1986 – 24 May 1989
- Constituency: Dublin

Personal details
- Born: Christopher Gerard O'Malley; 9 June 1959 (age 66) Dalkey, Dublin, Ireland
- Party: Fine Gael
- Spouse: Aideen Hayden (m. 1997)
- Children: 2
- Relatives: Kevin O'Higgins (grandfather); Iseult O'Malley (sister); Thomas F. O'Higgins (granduncle); Tom O'Higgins (cousin); Michael O'Higgins (cousin)

Christopher Gerard O'Malley (born 9 June 1959) is an Irish former Fine Gael politician who served as a Member of the European Parliament (MEP) for the Dublin constituency from 1986 to 1989.

In January 1986, he was nominated to the European Parliament by Fine Gael as an MEP following the resignation of Richie Ryan. He lost his seat at the 1989 European election. In 2003, he was co-opted to Dún Laoghaire–Rathdown County Council to replace Eamon Gilmore. He lost his seat at the 2004 local elections.

In November 2007, he was appointed Pro Vice-Chancellor (Regional and International Development) at the University of Wales, Newport.

He is the grandson of Kevin O'Higgins, the government minister assassinated in 1927. He is married to former Labour Party Senator Aideen Hayden.

== See also ==
- Families in the Oireachtas
