= T. F. O'Higgins =

T. F. O'Higgins may refer to:

- Thomas F. O'Higgins (1890–1953) Fine Gael politician
- Tom O'Higgins (1916–2003) Fine Gael politician, Chief Justice
