= Iseult O'Malley =

Irish judge (born 1964)

The Hon. Ms Justice Iseult O'Malley
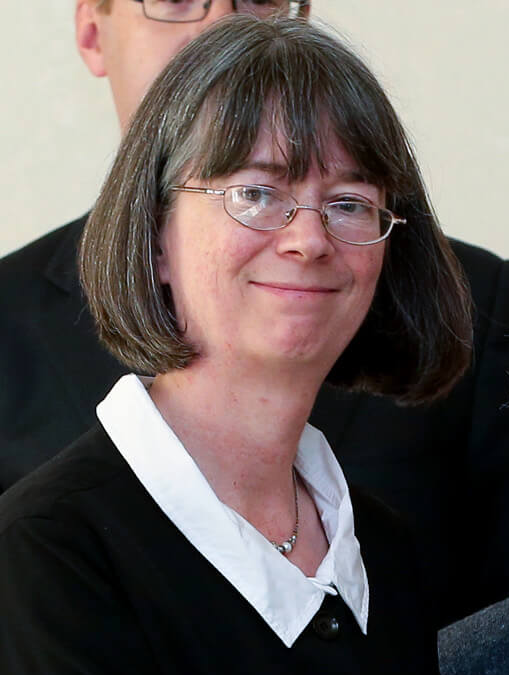
- O'Malley in 2015

Judge of the Supreme Court of Ireland
- Incumbent
- Assumed office 6 October 2015
- Nominated by: Government of Ireland
- Appointed by: Michael D. Higgins

Judge of the High Court
- In office 21 July 2012 – 6 October 2015
- Nominated by: Government of Ireland
- Appointed by: Michael D. Higgins

Personal details
- Born: 30 June 1964 (age 62) Dalkey, Dublin, Ireland
- Relatives: Kevin O'Higgins (grandfather); Chris O'Malley (brother); Aideen Hayden (sister-in-law); Thomas F. O'Higgins (granduncle); Tom O'Higgins (cousin); Michael O'Higgins (cousin)
- Education: Trinity College Dublin; King's Inns

Iseult Pauline Mary O'Malley (born 30 June 1964) is an Irish judge who has served as a Judge of the Supreme Court of Ireland since October 2015. She previously served as a Judge of the High Court from 2012 to 2015.

== Early life ==
O'Malley was born in 1964 to Una O'Higgins O'Malley, a writer, and Eoin O'Malley, a heart surgeon. She is a granddaughter of Kevin O'Higgins, the Minister for Justice who was assassinated in 1927. She has five brothers, including Chris O'Malley.

She was educated at Trinity College Dublin and King's Inns. She was the individual runner-up of the Irish Times Debate in 1982 and debated in the final of the Observer Mace in 1985 with David Keane.

== Legal career ==
She was called to the Bar in 1987, and became a Senior Counsel in 2007. She practised mainly in criminal law.

She was Director and Chair of the Free Legal Advice Centres (FLAC) from 1985 to 2012. During her time as chairperson, the organisation campaigned for the introduction of civil legal aid. She won a Person of the Year Award in 2004 for her work with FLAC. She also chaired the Refugee Agency between 1993 and 1996.

She was a member of the Employment Appeals Tribunal between 1995 and 1998 and concurrently served on the Hepatitis C Compensation Tribunal.

She was appointed a Bencher of the King's Inns in 2012.

== Judicial career ==
She was appointed as a Judge of the High Court in 2012.

She was nominated to the Supreme Court in July 2015 and was appointed by the President of Ireland on 1 October 2015. She made the Declaration required by the Constitution of a Justice of the Supreme Court on 6 October 2015. She has delivered opinions for the court in final appeals involving criminal law, contract law, EU law, ward of court, and judicial review.
