= Brigid Hogan-O'Higgins =

Irish politician (1932–2022)

- Hogan-O'Higgins in 1971

Teachta Dála
- In office June 1969 – June 1977
- Constituency: Clare–South Galway
- In office October 1961 – June 1969
- Constituency: Galway East
- In office March 1957 – October 1961
- Constituency: Galway South

Personal details
- Born: Brigid Hogan; 10 March 1932 Galway, Ireland
- Died: 2 November 2022 (aged 90) Galway, Ireland
- Party: Fine Gael
- Spouse: Michael O'Higgins (m. 1958–2005)
- Children: 9
- Parent: Patrick Hogan (father)
- Relatives: Thomas F. O'Higgins (father-in-law); Tom O'Higgins (brother-in-law)

Brigid Hogan-O'Higgins (née Hogan; 10 March 1932 – 2 November 2022) was an Irish Fine Gael politician who served as a Teachta Dála (TD) from 1957 to 1977. She was the first woman to represent County Galway in Dáil Éireann.

== Biography ==
Brigid Hogan was the daughter of Patrick Hogan, who died when she was 4 years old. He had been the Minister for Agriculture from 1922 to 1932.

At the age of 24, she was elected as a Fine Gael TD for the Galway South constituency at the 1957 general election. In doing so, she became the first woman to represent Galway in the Dáil. One year later she married fellow TD Michael O'Higgins and in doing so together they became the first married couple to serve in the Dáil together simultaneously.

Hogan-O'Higgins was re-elected at the 1961 general election for the Galway East constituency and again at the 1965 general election. After boundary changes, she was elected at the 1969 general election for Clare–South Galway, where she was returned for a fifth and final term at the 1973 general election.

Hogan-O'Higgins' years as a deputy were mostly spent in opposition: Fianna Fáil was in power continuously from 1957 to 1973, and it was only in her last term (in the 20th Dáil) that Fine Gael formed a government. She was the Fine Gael spokeswoman on Posts and Telegraphs from 1969 to 1972. She was defeated at the 1977 general election, when Jack Lynch led Fianna Fáil's return to government with a large majority.

Hogan-O'Higgins' husband, Michael O'Higgins, was also a TD, as were his father, uncle, and brother. Brigid and Michael had nine children. She was the last surviving member of the 16th Dáil.

Hogan-O'Higgins died in Galway on 2 November 2022, at the age of 90. Commenting on her death, the President of Ireland Michael D. Higgins stated she had made a "significant contribution to Irish politics" and recalled that "Both Brigid and [her husband] Michael were always courteous in respecting the views of others, while themselves offering their views with sincerity and consideration."

== See also ==
- Families in the Oireachtas

Honorary titles
Preceded by Kathleen O'Connor	Baby of the Dáil; 1957–1958	Succeeded by Anthony Millar

Dáil	Election	Deputy (Party)	Deputy (Party)	Deputy (Party)
13th	1948	Frank Fahy (Note: As Ceann Comhairle, Frank Fahy was returned automatically in each of the two elections held in Galway South in 1948 and 1951. He rejoined the Fianna Fáil parliamentary party in 1951.) (FF)	Patrick Beegan (FF)	Robert Lahiffe (FF)
14th	1951	Frank Fahy (FF)	Patrick Beegan (FF)	Patrick Cawley (FG)
14th	1953 by-election	Robert Lahiffe (FF)	Patrick Beegan (FF)	Patrick Cawley (FG)
15th	1954	Robert Lahiffe (FF)	Patrick Beegan (FF)	Brendan Glynn (FG)
16th	1957	Michael Carty (FF)	Patrick Beegan (FF)	Brigid Hogan-O'Higgins (FG)
16th	1958 by-election	Michael Carty (FF)	Anthony Millar (FF)	Brigid Hogan-O'Higgins (FG)
17th	1961	Constituency abolished. See Galway East and Galway West		

Dáil	Election	Deputy (Party)	Deputy (Party)	Deputy (Party)	Deputy (Party)
9th	1937	Frank Fahy (FF)	Mark Killilea Snr (FF)	Patrick Beegan (FF)	Seán Broderick (FG)
10th	1938	Frank Fahy (FF)	Mark Killilea Snr (FF)	Patrick Beegan (FF)	Seán Broderick (FG)
11th	1943	Frank Fahy (FF)	Mark Killilea Snr (FF)	Patrick Beegan (FF)	Michael Donnellan (CnaT)
12th	1944	Frank Fahy (FF)	Mark Killilea Snr (FF)	Patrick Beegan (FF)	Michael Donnellan (CnaT)
13th	1948	Constituency abolished. See Galway North and Galway South			

Dáil	Election	Deputy (Party)	Deputy (Party)	Deputy (Party)	Deputy (Party)	Deputy (Party)
17th	1961	Michael F. Kitt (FF)	Anthony Millar (FF)	Michael Carty (FF)	Michael Donnellan (CnaT)	Brigid Hogan-O'Higgins (FG)
17th	1964 by-election	Michael F. Kitt (FF)	Anthony Millar (FF)	Michael Carty (FF)	John Donnellan (FG)	Brigid Hogan-O'Higgins (FG)
18th	1965	Michael F. Kitt (FF)	Anthony Millar (FF)	Michael Carty (FF)	John Donnellan (FG)	Brigid Hogan-O'Higgins (FG)
19th	1969	Constituency abolished. See Galway North-East and Clare–South Galway				

Dáil	Election	Deputy (Party)	Deputy (Party)	Deputy (Party)	Deputy (Party)
21st	1977	Johnny Callanan (FF)	Thomas Hussey (FF)	Mark Killilea Jnr (FF)	John Donnellan (FG)
22nd	1981	Johnny Callanan (FF)	Michael P. Kitt (FF)	Paul Connaughton Snr (FG)	3 seats 1981–1997
23rd	1982 (Feb)	Johnny Callanan (FF)	Michael P. Kitt (FF)	Paul Connaughton Snr (FG)	3 seats 1981–1997
23rd	1982 by-election	Noel Treacy (FF)	Michael P. Kitt (FF)	Paul Connaughton Snr (FG)	3 seats 1981–1997
24th	1982 (Nov)	Noel Treacy (FF)	Michael P. Kitt (FF)	Paul Connaughton Snr (FG)	3 seats 1981–1997
25th	1987	Noel Treacy (FF)	Michael P. Kitt (FF)	Paul Connaughton Snr (FG)	3 seats 1981–1997
26th	1989	Noel Treacy (FF)	Michael P. Kitt (FF)	Paul Connaughton Snr (FG)	3 seats 1981–1997
27th	1992	Noel Treacy (FF)	Michael P. Kitt (FF)	Paul Connaughton Snr (FG)	3 seats 1981–1997
28th	1997	Noel Treacy (FF)	Michael P. Kitt (FF)	Paul Connaughton Snr (FG)	Ulick Burke (FG)
29th	2002	Noel Treacy (FF)	Joe Callanan (FF)	Paul Connaughton Snr (FG)	Paddy McHugh (Ind.)
30th	2007	Noel Treacy (FF)	Michael P. Kitt (FF)	Paul Connaughton Snr (FG)	Ulick Burke (FG)
31st	2011	Colm Keaveney (Lab)	Michael P. Kitt (FF)	Ciarán Cannon (FG)	Paul Connaughton Jnr (FG)
32nd	2016	Seán Canney (Ind.)	Anne Rabbitte (FF)	Ciarán Cannon (FG)	3 seats 2016–2024
33rd	2020	Seán Canney (Ind.)	Anne Rabbitte (FF)	Ciarán Cannon (FG)	3 seats 2016–2024
34th	2024	Seán Canney (Ind.)	Albert Dolan (FF)	Peter Roche (FG)	Louis O'Hara (SF)

Dáil	Election	Deputy (Party)	Deputy (Party)	Deputy (Party)
19th	1969	Bill Loughnane (FF)	Michael Carty (FF)	Brigid Hogan-O'Higgins (FG)
20th	1973	Bill Loughnane (FF)	Johnny Callanan (FF)	Brigid Hogan-O'Higgins (FG)
21st	1977	Constituency abolished. See Galway East, Galway West and Clare		
