= 1929 Dublin North by-election =

By-election to the 6th Dáil

- 14 March 1929
- Turnout: 56,739 (58.7%)
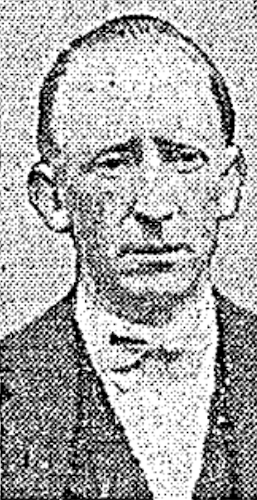

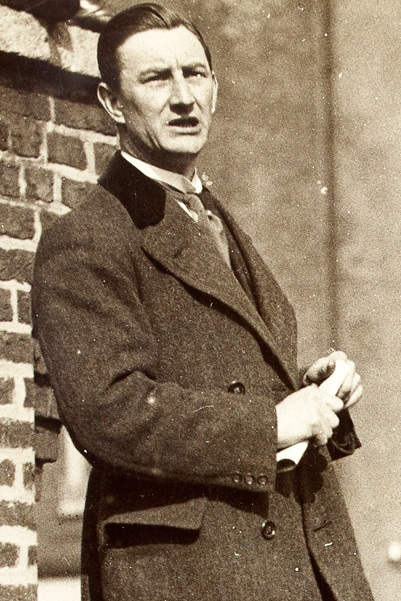
Nominee	Thomas F. O'Higgins	Oscar Traynor
Party	Cumann na nGaedheal	Fianna Fáil
First preferences	28,445	28,294
Percentage	50.1%	49.9%
TD before election
Alfie Byrne
Independent
TD after election
Thomas F. O'Higgins
Cumann na nGaedheal

A Dáil by-election was held in the constituency of Dublin North in the Irish Free State on Thursday, 14 March 1929, to fill a vacancy in the 6th Dáil. It followed the election of independent TD Alfie Byrne to Seanad Éireann.

Alfie Byrne was elected to the 1928 Seanad on 4 December 1928. Under Article 16 of the Constitution of the Irish Free State, he was deemed to have vacated his seat in the Dáil. The writ of election to fill the vacancy was agreed by the Dáil on 20 February 1929.

In 1929, Dublin North was an eight-seat constituency comprising the areas of Arran Quay, Clontarf East, Clontarf West, Drumcondra, Glasnevin, Inns' Quay, Rotunda, Mountjoy, North City and North Dock in the county borough of Dublin. The by-election was won by the Cumann na nGaedheal candidate Thomas F. O'Higgins, by a margin of 151 votes.

This was the second by-election in Dublin North during the 6th Dáil.

== Result ==
1929 Dublin North by-election
Party	Candidate	FPv%	Count
Party	Candidate	FPv%	1
Cumann na nGaedheal	Thomas F. O'Higgins	50.1	28,445
Fianna Fáil	Oscar Traynor	49.9	28,294
Electorate: 96,748 Valid: 56,739 Quota: 28,370 Turnout: 58.7%
