= William FitzGerald (Irish judge) =

Irish lawyer, judge and barrister

Chief Justice of Ireland
- In office 25 September 1973 – 17 October 1974
- Nominated by: Government of Ireland
- Appointed by: Éamon de Valera
- Preceded by: Cearbhall Ó Dálaigh
- Succeeded by: Tom O'Higgins

Judge of the Supreme Court
- In office 12 May 1966 – 17 October 1974
- Nominated by: Government of Ireland
- Appointed by: Éamon de Valera

Personal details
- Born: 4 January 1906 Cork, Ireland
- Died: 17 October 1974 (aged 68) Dublin, Ireland
- Resting place: Deansgrange Cemetery, Dublin, Ireland
- Spouse: Clare O'Brien (m. 1928)
- Children: 9
- Education: University College Dublin; King's Inns

William O'Brien FitzGerald (4 January 1906 – 17 October 1974) was an Irish lawyer, judge and barrister who served as Chief Justice of Ireland from 1973 to 1974 and a Judge of the Supreme Court from 1966 to 1974.

He was born in Cork in 1906, and was educated at Belvedere College, Dublin, and King's Inns. He was called to the Bar in 1927 and to the Inner Bar in 1944. He was appointed directly to the Supreme Court of Ireland. In 1972, on the retirement of Cearbhall Ó Dálaigh, FitzGerald was appointed as Chief Justice of Ireland. He had a relatively brief tenure as Chief Justice and died suddenly on 17 October 1974.

Legal offices
Preceded by Cearbhall Ó Dálaigh	Chief Justice of Ireland; 1973–1974	Succeeded by Tom O'Higgins
