= 1928 Dublin North by-election =

By-election to the 6th Dáil

- 3 April 1928
- Turnout: 43,285 (45.9%)
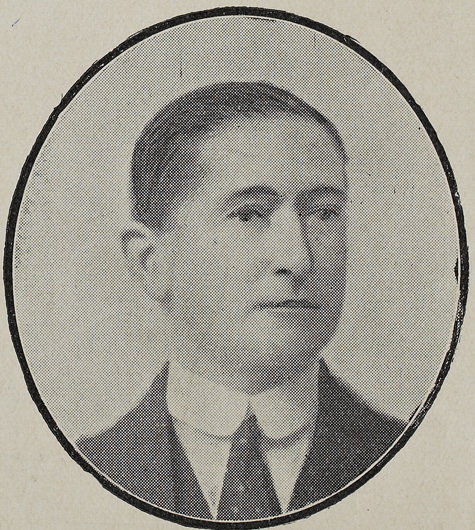

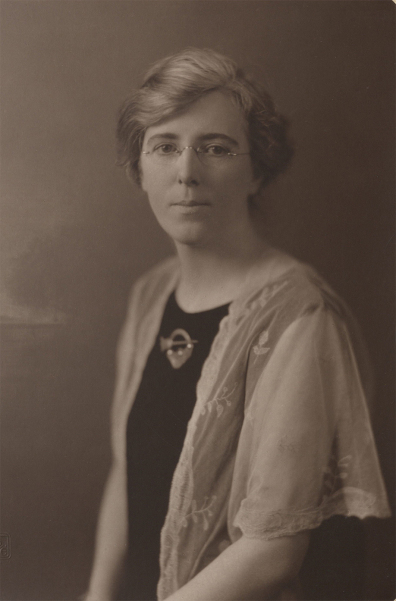

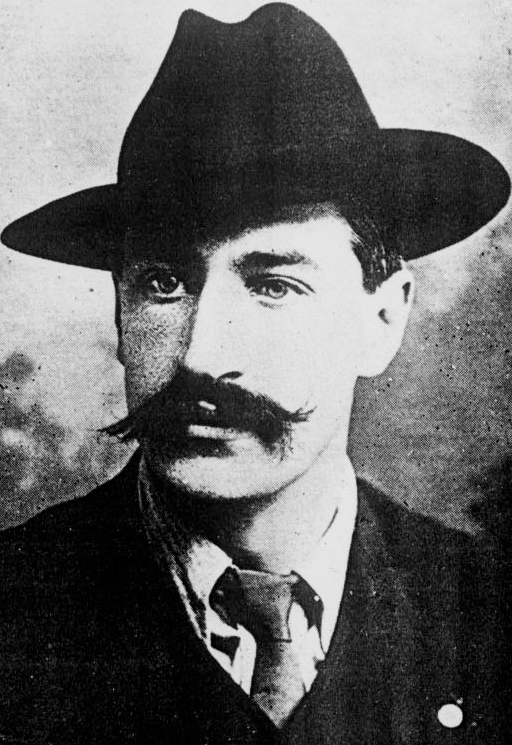
Nominee	Vincent Rice	Kathleen Clarke	James Larkin
Party	Cumann na nGaedheal	Fianna Fáil	Irish Worker League
First preferences	21,731	13,322	8,232
Percentage	50.2%	30.8%	19.0%
TD before election
James Larkin
Irish Worker League
TD after election
Vincent Rice
Cumann na nGaedheal

A Dáil by-election was held in the constituency of Dublin North in the Irish Free State on Tuesday, 3 April 1928, to fill a vacancy in the 6th Dáil. It followed the disqualification of Irish Worker League TD James Larkin due to bankruptcy. Larkin had been elected at the September 1927 general election, but had not taken his seat.

In 1928, Dublin North was an eight-seat constituency comprising the areas of Arran Quay, Clontarf East, Clontarf West, Drumcondra, Glasnevin, Inns' Quay, Rotunda, Mountjoy, North City and North Dock in the county borough of Dublin.

Jim Larkin had been adjudicated on 21 November 1924 on bankruptcy in the High Court of Justice. This followed his failure to settle the terms of a libel action which had been brought by fellow trade unionist, William O'Brien. A government motion on 1 March 1928 to issue writ of election to fill the vacancy was opposed by Fianna Fáil and the Labour Party. Éamon de Valera proposed an amendment to the motion that the writ be deferred until a court declared that the vacancy existed. The following day, the matter was referred to the Committee on Procedure and Privileges. On 14 March, debate on the motion continued, with the Fianna Fáil amendment rejected, and the government motion approved, by a vote of 80 to 50.

The disqualified TD Larkin stood at the by-election, but it was won by the Cumann na nGaedheal candidate Vincent Rice.

A second by-election in Dublin North was held later in the 6th Dáil.

== Result ==
1928 Dublin North by-election
Party	Candidate	FPv%	Count
Party	Candidate	FPv%	1
Cumann na nGaedheal	Vincent Rice	50.2	21,731
Fianna Fáil	Kathleen Clarke	30.8	13,322
Irish Worker League	James Larkin	19.0	8,232
Electorate: 94,390 Valid: 43,285 Quota: 21,643 Turnout: 45.9%
