= Aideen Hayden =

Irish former politician (born 1959)

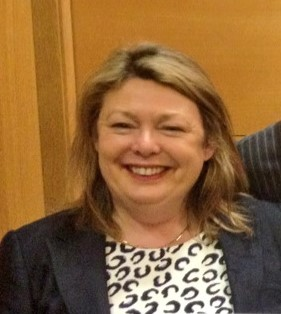
- Hayden in 2014

Senator
- In office 25 May 2011 – 8 June 2016
- Constituency: Nominated by the Taoiseach

Personal details
- Born: 6 January 1959 (age 67) Waterford, Ireland
- Party: Labour Party
- Spouse: Chris O'Malley (m. 1997)
- Children: 2
- Relatives: Iseult O'Malley (sister-in-law)
- Education: University College Dublin

Aideen Hayden (born 1 June 1959) is an Irish former Labour Party politician who served as a Senator from 2011 to 2016, after being nominated by the Taoiseach.

== Early life and career ==
Hayden was born in Waterford in 1959, but is a native of County Carlow. She moved to Dublin and attended St Joseph of Cluny Secondary School. Hayden did a Bachelors of Economics and History in University College Dublin (1981). She also obtained a PhD in Applied Social Sciences.

Hayden qualified as a solicitor and practiced between 1989 and 2008.

She became Chair of Threshold in 1999. She was also a Board Member of the Private Residential Tenancies Board from 2004 to 2011. She resigned her Board membership when she was appointed to the Seanad.

Hayden received a PhD in Housing Policy from University College Dublin in 2014.

== Political career ==
She unsuccessfully contested the 2011 Seanad election for the Industrial and Commercial Panel. In May 2011, she was nominated by Taoiseach Enda Kenny to the 24th Seanad. She was the Labour Party Seanad Spokesperson on Housing, Children and Youth Affairs and later replaced Senator Susan O'Keefe as Labour Whip.

She also held the positions of Spokesperson on Finance and Spokesperson on European Affairs.

Hayden introduced a private member's motion to establish schemes for distressed mortgage holders which received cross-party support.

Hayden was Vice-Chair of the Joint Oireachtas Committee on Finance, Public Expenditure and Reform.

In 2016, she ran for the NUI Panel for the Seanad as an Independent but was not elected.

She received the UCD Alumni Award for Social Sciences in 2016.

== See also ==
- Families in the Oireachtas
