= Kevin O'Higgins =

Irish politician (1892–1927)

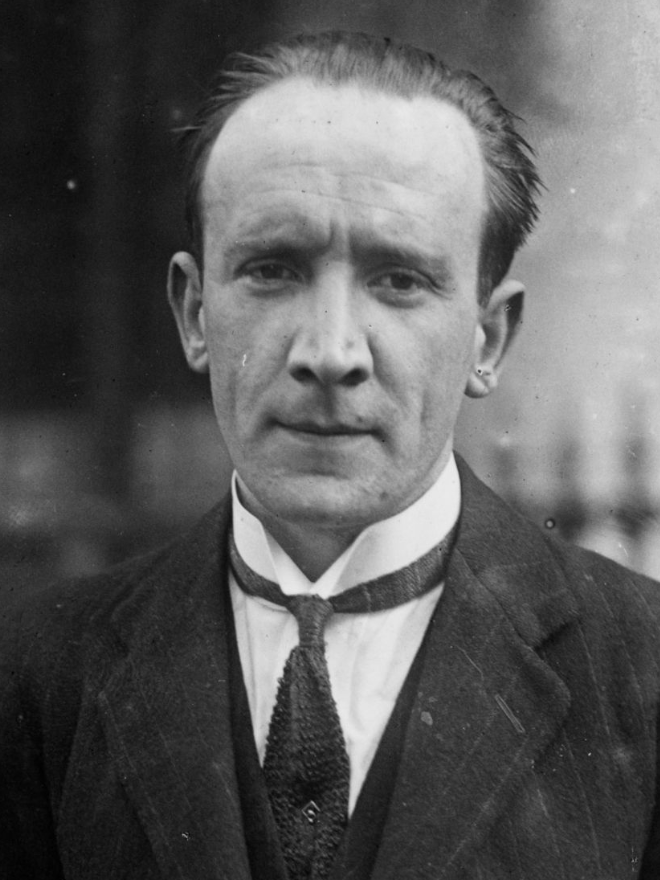
- O'Higgins in 1922

Vice-President of the Executive Council
- In office 6 December 1922 – 10 July 1927
- President: W. T. Cosgrave
- Preceded by: New office
- Succeeded by: Ernest Blythe

Minister for Justice
- In office 30 August 1922 – 10 July 1927
- President: W. T. Cosgrave
- Preceded by: Eamonn Duggan
- Succeeded by: W. T. Cosgrave

Minister for External Affairs
- In office 23 June 1927 – 10 July 1927
- President: W. T. Cosgrave
- Preceded by: Desmond FitzGerald
- Succeeded by: W. T. Cosgrave

Minister for Economic Affairs
- In office 10 January 1922 – 9 September 1922
- President: Michael Collins; W. T. Cosgrave
- Preceded by: Robert Barton
- Succeeded by: Ernest Blythe

Teachta Dála
- In office August 1923 – 10 July 1927
- Constituency: Dublin County
- In office May 1921 – August 1923
- Constituency: Leix–Offaly
- In office June 1918 – May 1921
- Constituency: Queen's County

Personal details
- Born: 7 June 1892 Stradbally, County Laois, Ireland
- Died: 10 July 1927 (aged 35) Booterstown, Dublin, Ireland
- Cause of death: Assassination
- Resting place: Glasnevin Cemetery, Dublin, Ireland
- Party: Cumann na nGaedheal (1923–1927)
- Other political affiliations: Sinn Féin (1918–1923)
- Spouse: Brigid Cole (m. 1915)
- Children: 5
- Relatives: Timothy Daniel Sullivan (grandfather); Tim Healy (uncle-in-law); Thomas F. O'Higgins (brother); Tom O'Higgins (nephew); Michael O'Higgins (nephew); Iseult O'Malley (granddaughter)
- Education: University College Dublin

Kevin Christopher O'Higgins (Irish: Caoimhghín Críostóir Ó hUigín; 7 June 1892 – 10 July 1927) was an Irish politician who served as Vice-President of the Executive Council and Minister for Justice from 1922 to 1927, Minister for External Affairs from June 1927 to July 1927 and Minister for Economic Affairs from January 1922 to September 1922. He served as a Teachta Dála (TD) from 1918 to 1927.

He was part of early nationalist Sinn Féin, before going on to become a prominent member of Cumann na nGaedheal. In his capacity as Minister for Justice, O'Higgins established the Garda Síochána police force. His brother Thomas and nephews Tom and Michael were also elected TDs at various stages.

Along with Arthur Griffith, Michael Collins and Eoin O'Duffy, O'Higgins is an important figure in Irish nationalist historiography, representing a more "conservative revolutionary" position when contrasted with republicanism. After having a role in the Irish War of Independence, he went on to defend the nascent Irish Free State, as part of the pro-Treaty side in the Irish Civil War. During this time he signed the execution orders of seventy-seven prisoners. He was later assassinated in retaliation by an IRA unit in Booterstown, County Dublin.

== Background ==
Kevin O'Higgins was born in Stradbally, County Laois, one of sixteen children of Dr. Thomas Higgins and Anne Sullivan, daughter of the Nationalist politician Timothy Daniel Sullivan. His aunt was married to the Nationalist Member of Parliament (MP) Tim Healy. He was educated at the Jesuit-run Clongowes Wood College, where he was expelled. O'Higgins was then moved to Knockbeg College, St. Marys Christian Brother School, Portlaoise. With a view to becoming a priest he went to St Patrick's College, Maynooth. There he broke the non-smoking rules, and was removed to Carlow Seminary. He attended University College Dublin.

O'Higgins joined the Irish Volunteers in 1915. He was efficient, had a forceful personality and was soon appointed captain of Stradbally company, Carlow brigade. He joined Sinn Féin, but was soon arrested and imprisoned in 1918 for making an anti-conscription speech. While he was in prison he became MP for Queen's County (Laois).

== 1919–1923 ==
In 1919, the First Dáil elected its Ministry under the shadow of the War of Independence. O'Higgins was appointed as the Assistant Minister for Local Government under W. T. Cosgrave. When Cosgrave was arrested in 1920, O'Higgins took the lead as head of the Ministry. Like other writers on Sinn Féin, O'Higgins believed the extremists were self-deluded; they themselves rejected the damning epithet "extremist". When he wrote on disillusionment he articulated this fear:

the whole history of the world is the triumph of mind over matter. We are backing our Idea against aeroplanes and armoured cars.

Sinn Féin split in 1922 over the terms of the Anglo-Irish Treaty. In the debate that took place in the Dáil on the Treaty, O'Higgins outlined the reasons for his support thus:

Last October the Minister of Local Government W. T. Cosgrave and myself came deliberately to the decision that we would not recommend any settlement involving allegiance to the King of England. That is true, but I am not ashamed to plead guilty to the fact that I consider political realities and the consequence of my vote... I would have gone back to war rather than recommend a settlement involving allegiance if the Treaty had not been signed. But I face the political situation and realise that some of the biggest personalities in our movement ... have considered this is the last ounce [that] could be got from England, and who, knowing the situation better than I do, attached their names to that document.

During the campaign for the 1922 general election, he told a crowd:

I have not abandoned any political aspirations to which I have given expression in the past, but in the existing circumstances I advise the people to trust to evolution rather than revolution for their attainment.

He was duly elected as a TD for Leix–Offaly, becoming Minister for Justice and External Affairs in the Provisional Government.

=== Irish Civil War ===
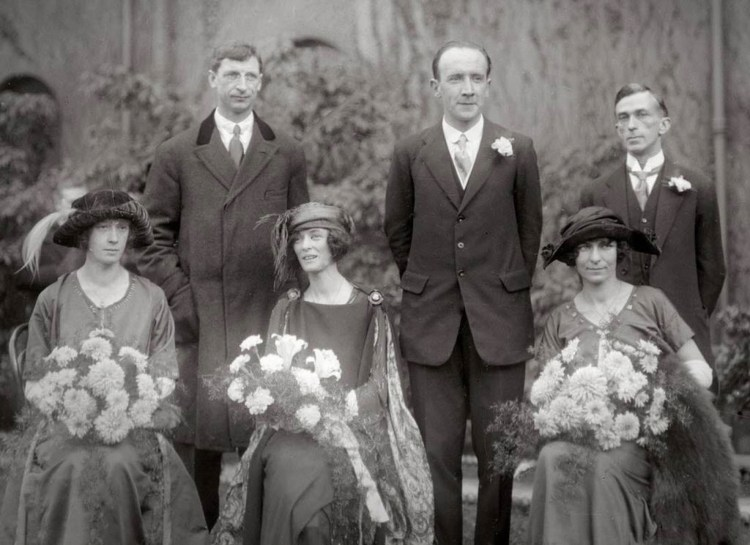
back row l-r: Éamon de Valera, O'Higgins and his best man, Rory O'Connor at O'Higgins' wedding, October 1921. On 8 December 1922 O'Higgins signed O'Connor's execution order.

When the Irish Civil War broke out in June 1922, O'Higgins tried to restore law and order by introducing tough measures. Between then and mid-1923, he confirmed the sentences of execution of seventy-seven republican prisoners of war. The executions of Liam Mellows, Richard Barrett, Joe McKelvey and Rory O'Connor, was particularly noteworthy given O'Connor had been best man at O'Higgins wedding to Brigid Cole the previous year. The men were executed for a crime that was legislated for after their imprisonment and were offered no trial. O'Higgins and his colleagues did not view them as prisoners of war, but rather as criminals. Today, the executions O'Higgins legislated for are seen as unconstitutional even by the Fine Gael party, the inheritors of the Pro-Treaty party. In 2022, then Taoiseach, Micheál Martin said the four executions were “murder by any definition and were seen so as that at the time”. The contemporary Labour Party leader Tom Johnson said the executions were "utterly to destroy in the public mind the association of the Government with the idea of law. I am almost forced to say you have killed the new State at its birth". On 11 February 1923, the Anti-Treaty IRA killed his father, who had snatched a revolver from the leader of a raiding party in his family home in Stradbally, County Laois.

O'Higgins feared, as did many of his colleagues, that a prolonged civil conflict would give the British an excuse, in the eyes of the world, to reassert their control in the Free State. He was given a nominal posting to the Irish Army during the early stages of the war, which he described as "very short, though very brilliant". General Richard Mulcahy was less impressed, recalling that "O'Higgins' personal presence in the Adjutant-General's office at that time (July–August 1922) was the personal presence of a person who didn't understand what was going on".

In August 1922, following Collins's assassination, O'Higgins was moved from the Army to Ministry of Home Affairs. O'Higgins had formed a negative view of Cosgrave, having worked under him at Local Government, and was not happy when the latter was appointed President of the Executive Council. Of the alternatives Mulcahy had been seen as indecisive, pedantic and too close to the Army (opinions which the subsequent Kenmare incident would make widespread), whereas O'Higgins himself was not avowedly republican. In the Government of the 3rd Dáil, he would be classed, along with Desmond FitzGerald, as one of the "Donnybrook set" – out of step with the rest on issues such as Irish language, autarky and militarism.

O'Higgins had set up the Garda Síochána, but by September 1922, the force was experiencing indiscipline in the ranks. He appointed Eoin O'Duffy as Garda Commissioner. At the time, O'Duffy was a fine organiser and worked for the emergence of a respected and unarmed police force. O'Duffy insisted on a Catholic nationalist ethos to distinguish the Gardaí from their RIC predecessors. He became increasingly authoritarian in later years, however, a fact that caused several high-profile arguments between himself and O'Higgins. Cosgrave appointed O'Higgins as vice-president in December that year.

== Politics and later career ==
In March 1924, midway through the 'Army Mutiny', Minister Joseph McGrath resigned from the cabinet and President Cosgrave took sick leave. O'Higgins, as de facto head of government, reversed Cosgrave's policy of appeasement and confronted the IRAO mutineers confounding their objectives. In June, the Ministers and Secretaries Act 1924 changed his title from Minister for Home Affairs to Minister for Justice.

As Minister for External Affairs he successfully increased Ireland's autonomy within the Commonwealth of Nations. O'Higgins was seen very much as the "strong man" of the cabinet. He once described himself as one of "the most conservative-minded revolutionaries that ever put through a successful revolution". Though far-left political enemies characterised him as having supposed "fascist" tendencies, O'Higgins was to the fore in resisting the small wing of Cumann na nGaedheal who looked to Italy for inspiration. He did not approve of feminism, for instance when asked by Leader of the Labour Party Thomas Johnson in the Dáil whether he believed giving women the vote had been a success, O'Higgins replied, "I would not like to pronounce an opinion on it in public".

He derided the socialist influenced Democratic Programme of the First Dáil as "mostly poetry". Before his death, he toyed with Arthur Griffith's idea of a dual monarchy to end the Partition of Ireland.

== Assassination ==
At approximately midday on Sunday 10 July 1927, O'Higgins was assassinated at the age of 35 by three anti-Treaty members of the IRA, Timothy Coughlan, Bill Gannon and Archie Doyle, in revenge for O'Higgins' part in the executions of 77 IRA prisoners during the civil war. O'Higgins had been walking from his home on Cross Avenue, Blackrock to mass on Booterstown Avenue. He had been accompanied by an armed garda detective but had sent the detective back to Blackrock to buy cigarettes. As he approached the junction with Booterstown Avenue, one of the assassins emerged from a parked car and shot him. O'Higgins ran a short distance before collapsing, and one of the assailants shot him again as he lay on the ground. The men then got back in their car and drove away. Despite being hit eight times, O'Higgins did not die for almost five hours. Harry White, the former IRA chief of staff explained the cause of the assassination as; "As minister for justice, he ordered the murder of his former friends, Rory O’Connor, Liam Mellows, Dick Barrett and Joe McKelvey in Mountjoy Jail .. That’s why he was killed."

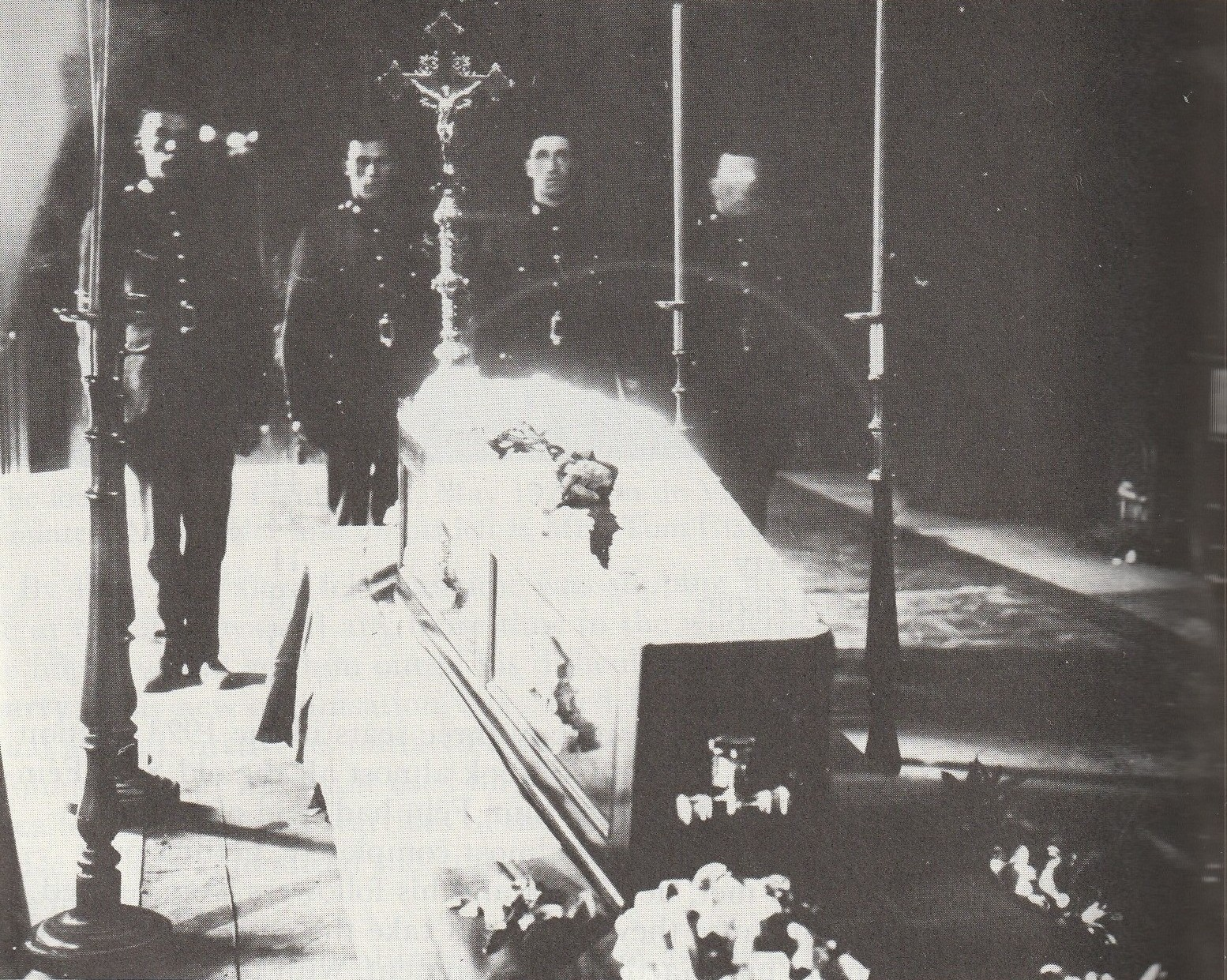
The body of Kevin O'Higgins lying in state in the Mansion House, July 1927

None of the three assassins was ever apprehended or charged, but Coughlan, a member of Fianna Fáil as well as the IRA, was killed in strange circumstances in Dublin, in 1928, by a police undercover agent whom he was attempting to murder. The other two (Doyle and Gannon) benefited from the amnesty to IRA members issued by Éamon de Valera, upon his assumption of power in 1932. Gannon, who died in 1965, joined the Communist Party of Ireland and played a central role in organising Irish volunteers for the Spanish Civil War. Yet in party publications, his part in assassinating O'Higgins is downplayed. Doyle remained a prominent IRA militant and took part in various acts in the early 1940s. He lived to an old age, dying in 1980, and continued to take pride in having killed O'Higgins.

== Legacy ==
O'Higgins' body lay in state in the Mansion House before a state funeral held at St Andrew's Church, Westland Row. He was buried at Glasnevin Cemetery.

In 1927, a relief of O'Higgins was posthumously added to a 1923 cenotaph in the grounds of Leinster House dedicated to Michael Collins and Arthur Griffith. This was replaced in 1950, by a simpler granite obelisk commemorating Griffith, Collins and O'Higgins.

In July 2012, Taoiseach Enda Kenny unveiled a commemorative plaque to his memory at the site in Booterstown, at the junction of Cross Avenue and Booterstown Avenue, where he was shot. Red paint was sprayed over this memorial within its first week, and it was further damaged shortly afterwards. It was removed some two weeks later and has not returned.

His brother Thomas F. O'Higgins and nephews Tom O'Higgins and Michael O'Higgins were later elected TDs. His granddaughter Iseult O'Malley is a judge of the Supreme Court of Ireland.

== Gallery ==
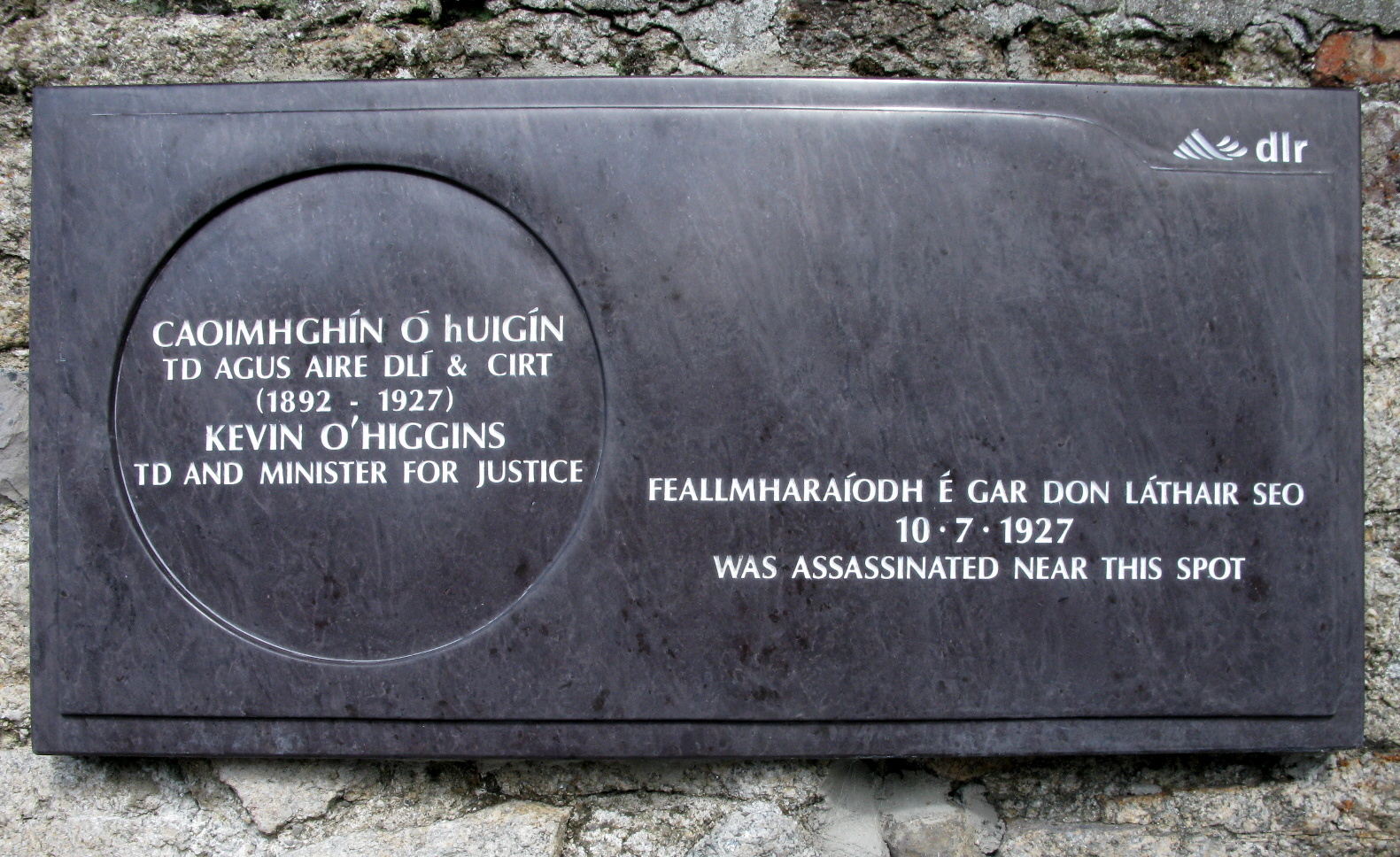
2012 memorial plaque to O'Higgins, located briefly near the site where he was shot

British Army military intelligence file for Kevin O'Higgins

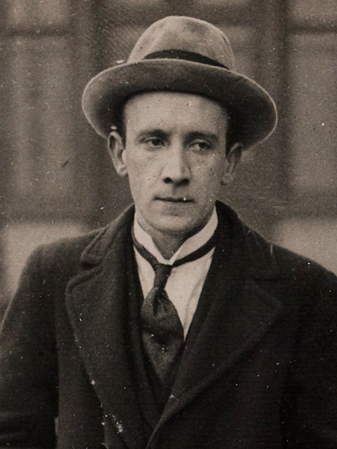
O'Higgins in 1922

== See also ==
- Families in the Oireachtas

Parliament of the United Kingdom
New constituency	Member of Parliament for Queen's County; 1918–1922	Constituency abolished
Oireachtas
New constituency	Teachta Dála for Queen's County; 1918–1921	Constituency abolished
Political offices
New office	Assistant Minister for Local Government; 1919–1922	Succeeded by Lorcan Robbins
Preceded by Robert Barton	Minister for Economic Affairs; 1922	Succeeded by Ernest Blythe
New office	Vice-President of the Executive Council; 1922–1927	Succeeded by Ernest Blythe
Preceded by Eamonn Duggan	Minister for Justice; 1922–1927	Succeeded by W. T. Cosgrave (acting)
Preceded by Desmond FitzGerald	Minister for External Affairs; Jun–Jul 1927	Succeeded by W. T. Cosgrave (acting)

Dáil	Election	Deputy (Party)	Deputy (Party)	Deputy (Party)	Deputy (Party)	Deputy (Party)
2nd	1921	Joseph Lynch (SF)	Patrick McCartan (SF)	Francis Bulfin (SF)	Kevin O'Higgins (SF)	4 seats 1921–1923
3rd	1922	William Davin (Lab)	Patrick McCartan (PT-SF)	Francis Bulfin (PT-SF)	Kevin O'Higgins (PT-SF)	4 seats 1921–1923
4th	1923	William Davin (Lab)	Laurence Brady (Rep)	Francis Bulfin (CnaG)	Patrick Egan (CnaG)	Seán McGuinness (Rep)
4th	1926 by-election	William Davin (Lab)	Laurence Brady (Rep)	Francis Bulfin (CnaG)	Patrick Egan (CnaG)	James Dwyer (CnaG)
5th	1927 (Jun)	William Davin (Lab)	Patrick Boland (FF)	Thomas Tynan (FF)	John Gill (Lab)	James Dwyer (CnaG)
6th	1927 (Sep)	William Davin (Lab)	Patrick Boland (FF)	Patrick Gorry (FF)	William Aird (CnaG)	James Dwyer (CnaG)
7th	1932	William Davin (Lab)	Patrick Boland (FF)	Patrick Gorry (FF)	Thomas F. O'Higgins (CnaG)	Eugene O'Brien (CnaG)
8th	1933	William Davin (Lab)	Patrick Boland (FF)	Eamon Donnelly (FF)	Thomas F. O'Higgins (CnaG)	Jack Finlay (NCP)
9th	1937	William Davin (Lab)	Patrick Boland (FF)	Patrick Gorry (FF)	Thomas F. O'Higgins (FG)	Jack Finlay (FG)
10th	1938	William Davin (Lab)	Patrick Boland (FF)	Patrick Gorry (FF)	Thomas F. O'Higgins (FG)	Daniel Hogan (FF)
11th	1943	William Davin (Lab)	Patrick Boland (FF)	Patrick Gorry (FF)	Thomas F. O'Higgins (FG)	Oliver J. Flanagan (IMR)
12th	1944	William Davin (Lab)	Patrick Boland (FF)	Patrick Gorry (FF)	Thomas F. O'Higgins (FG)	Oliver J. Flanagan (IMR)
13th	1948	William Davin (Lab)	Patrick Boland (FF)	Patrick Gorry (FF)	Tom O'Higgins, Jnr (FG)	Oliver J. Flanagan (Ind.)
14th	1951	William Davin (Lab)	Patrick Boland (FF)	Peadar Maher (FF)	Tom O'Higgins, Jnr (FG)	Oliver J. Flanagan (Ind.)
15th	1954	William Davin (Lab)	Nicholas Egan (FF)	Peadar Maher (FF)	Tom O'Higgins, Jnr (FG)	Oliver J. Flanagan (FG)
15th	1956 by-election	Kieran Egan (FF)	Nicholas Egan (FF)	Peadar Maher (FF)	Tom O'Higgins, Jnr (FG)	Oliver J. Flanagan (FG)
16th	1957	Kieran Egan (FF)	Nicholas Egan (FF)	Peadar Maher (FF)	Tom O'Higgins, Jnr (FG)	Oliver J. Flanagan (FG)
17th	1961	Kieran Egan (FF)	Nicholas Egan (FF)	Patrick Lalor (FF)	Tom O'Higgins, Jnr (FG)	Oliver J. Flanagan (FG)
18th	1965	Henry Byrne (Lab)	Nicholas Egan (FF)	Patrick Lalor (FF)	Tom O'Higgins, Jnr (FG)	Oliver J. Flanagan (FG)
19th	1969	Ger Connolly (FF)	Bernard Cowen (FF)	Patrick Lalor (FF)	Tom Enright (FG)	Oliver J. Flanagan (FG)
20th	1973	Ger Connolly (FF)	Charles McDonald (FG)	Patrick Lalor (FF)	Tom Enright (FG)	Oliver J. Flanagan (FG)
21st	1977	Ger Connolly (FF)	Bernard Cowen (FF)	Patrick Lalor (FF)	Tom Enright (FG)	Oliver J. Flanagan (FG)
22nd	1981	Ger Connolly (FF)	Bernard Cowen (FF)	Liam Hyland (FF)	Tom Enright (FG)	Oliver J. Flanagan (FG)
23rd	1982 (Feb)	Ger Connolly (FF)	Bernard Cowen (FF)	Liam Hyland (FF)	Tom Enright (FG)	Oliver J. Flanagan (FG)
24th	1982 (Nov)	Ger Connolly (FF)	Bernard Cowen (FF)	Liam Hyland (FF)	Tom Enright (FG)	Oliver J. Flanagan (FG)
24th	1984 by-election	Ger Connolly (FF)	Brian Cowen (FF)	Liam Hyland (FF)	Tom Enright (FG)	Oliver J. Flanagan (FG)
25th	1987	Ger Connolly (FF)	Brian Cowen (FF)	Liam Hyland (FF)	Tom Enright (FG)	Charles Flanagan (FG)
26th	1989	Ger Connolly (FF)	Brian Cowen (FF)	Liam Hyland (FF)	Tom Enright (FG)	Charles Flanagan (FG)
27th	1992	Ger Connolly (FF)	Brian Cowen (FF)	Liam Hyland (FF)	Pat Gallagher (Lab)	Charles Flanagan (FG)
28th	1997	John Moloney (FF)	Brian Cowen (FF)	Seán Fleming (FF)	Tom Enright (FG)	Charles Flanagan (FG)
29th	2002	John Moloney (FF)	Brian Cowen (FF)	Seán Fleming (FF)	Olwyn Enright (FG)	Tom Parlon (PDs)
30th	2007	John Moloney (FF)	Brian Cowen (FF)	Seán Fleming (FF)	Olwyn Enright (FG)	Charles Flanagan (FG)
31st	2011	Brian Stanley (SF)	Barry Cowen (FF)	Seán Fleming (FF)	Marcella Corcoran Kennedy (FG)	Charles Flanagan (FG)
32nd	2016	Constituency abolished. See Laois and Offaly.				
33rd	2020	Brian Stanley (SF)	Barry Cowen (FF)	Seán Fleming (FF)	Carol Nolan (Ind.)	Charles Flanagan (FG)
33rd	2024	Brian Stanley (SF)	(Vacant)	Seán Fleming (FF)	Carol Nolan (Ind.)	Charles Flanagan (FG)
34th	2024	Constituency abolished. See Laois and Offaly.				

Dáil	Election	Deputy (Party)	Deputy (Party)	Deputy (Party)	Deputy (Party)	Deputy (Party)	Deputy (Party)	Deputy (Party)	Deputy (Party)
2nd	1921	Michael Derham (SF)	George Gavan Duffy (SF)	Séamus Dwyer (SF)	Desmond FitzGerald (SF)	Frank Lawless (SF)	Margaret Pearse (SF)	6 seats 1921–1923	
3rd	1922	Michael Derham (PT-SF)	George Gavan Duffy (PT-SF)	Thomas Johnson (Lab)	Desmond FitzGerald (PT-SF)	Darrell Figgis (Ind)	John Rooney (FP)	6 seats 1921–1923	
4th	1923	Michael Derham (CnaG)	Bryan Cooper (Ind)	Thomas Johnson (Lab)	Desmond FitzGerald (CnaG)	Darrell Figgis (Ind)	John Good (Ind)	Kathleen Lynn (Rep)	Kevin O'Higgins (CnaG)
4th	1924 by-election	Batt O'Connor (CnaG)	Bryan Cooper (Ind)	Thomas Johnson (Lab)	Desmond FitzGerald (CnaG)	Darrell Figgis (Ind)	John Good (Ind)	Kathleen Lynn (Rep)	Kevin O'Higgins (CnaG)
4th	1926 by-election	Batt O'Connor (CnaG)	Bryan Cooper (Ind)	Thomas Johnson (Lab)	Desmond FitzGerald (CnaG)	William Norton (Lab)	John Good (Ind)	Kathleen Lynn (Rep)	Kevin O'Higgins (CnaG)
5th	1927 (Jun)	Batt O'Connor (CnaG)	Bryan Cooper (Ind)	Thomas Johnson (Lab)	Desmond FitzGerald (CnaG)	Patrick Belton (FF)	John Good (Ind)	Seán MacEntee (FF)	Kevin O'Higgins (CnaG)
5th	1927 by-election	Batt O'Connor (CnaG)	Bryan Cooper (Ind)	Thomas Johnson (Lab)	Desmond FitzGerald (CnaG)	Patrick Belton (FF)	John Good (Ind)	Seán MacEntee (FF)	Gearóid O'Sullivan (CnaG)
6th	1927 (Sep)	Batt O'Connor (CnaG)	Bryan Cooper (CnaG)	Joseph Murphy (Ind)	Desmond FitzGerald (CnaG)	Seán Brady (FF)	John Good (Ind)	Seán MacEntee (FF)	Gearóid O'Sullivan (CnaG)
6th	1930 by-election	Batt O'Connor (CnaG)	Thomas Finlay (CnaG)	Joseph Murphy (Ind)	Desmond FitzGerald (CnaG)	Seán Brady (FF)	John Good (Ind)	Seán MacEntee (FF)	Gearóid O'Sullivan (CnaG)
7th	1932	Batt O'Connor (CnaG)	Thomas Finlay (CnaG)	Patrick Curran (Lab)	Henry Dockrell (CnaG)	Seán Brady (FF)	John Good (Ind)	Seán MacEntee (FF)	Gearóid O'Sullivan (CnaG)
8th	1933	Batt O'Connor (CnaG)	John A. Costello (CnaG)	Margaret Mary Pearse (FF)	Henry Dockrell (CnaG)	Seán Brady (FF)	John Good (Ind)	Seán MacEntee (FF)	Gearóid O'Sullivan (CnaG)
8th	1935 by-election	Cecil Lavery (FG)	John A. Costello (CnaG)	Margaret Mary Pearse (FF)	Henry Dockrell (CnaG)	Seán Brady (FF)	John Good (Ind)	Seán MacEntee (FF)	Gearóid O'Sullivan (CnaG)
9th	1937	Cecil Lavery (FG)	Henry Dockrell (FG)	Gerrard McGowan (Lab)	Patrick Fogarty (FF)	Seán Brady (FF)	5 seats 1937–1948		
10th	1938	Patrick Belton (FG)	Henry Dockrell (FG)	Thomas Mullen (FF)	Patrick Fogarty (FF)	Seán Brady (FF)	5 seats 1937–1948		
11th	1943	Liam Cosgrave (FG)	Henry Dockrell (FG)	James Tunney (Lab)	Patrick Fogarty (FF)	Seán Brady (FF)	5 seats 1937–1948		
12th	1944	Liam Cosgrave (FG)	Henry Dockrell (FG)	Patrick Burke (FF)	Patrick Fogarty (FF)	Seán Brady (FF)	5 seats 1937–1948		
12th	1947 by-election	Liam Cosgrave (FG)	Henry Dockrell (FG)	Patrick Burke (FF)	Seán MacBride (CnaP)	Seán Brady (FF)	5 seats 1937–1948		
13th	1948	Éamon Rooney (FG)	Seán Dunne (Lab)	Patrick Burke (FF)	3 seats 1948–1961				
14th	1951	Éamon Rooney (FG)	Seán Dunne (Lab)	Patrick Burke (FF)	3 seats 1948–1961				
15th	1954	Éamon Rooney (FG)	Seán Dunne (Lab)	Patrick Burke (FF)	3 seats 1948–1961				
16th	1957	Éamon Rooney (FG)	Kevin Boland (FF)	Patrick Burke (FF)	3 seats 1948–1961				
17th	1961	Éamon Rooney (FG)	Kevin Boland (FF)	Patrick Burke (FF)	Mark Clinton (FG)	Seán Dunne (Ind)	5 seats 1961–1969		
18th	1965	Des Foley (FF)	Kevin Boland (FF)	Patrick Burke (FF)	Mark Clinton (FG)	Seán Dunne (Lab)	5 seats 1961–1969		
19th	1969	Constituency abolished. See Dublin County North and Dublin County South							
