= Tom O'Higgins =

Irish politician and judge (1916–2003)

Chief Justice of Ireland
- In office 17 October 1974 – 1 October 1985
- Nominated by: Government of Ireland
- Appointed by: Erskine H. Childers
- Preceded by: William FitzGerald
- Succeeded by: Thomas Finlay

Judge of the European Court of Justice
- In office 16 January 1985 – 6 October 1991
- Nominated by: Government of Ireland
- Appointed by: European Council

Judge of the Supreme Court
- In office 14 May 1974 – 1 October 1985
- Nominated by: Government of Ireland
- Appointed by: Erskine H. Childers

Judge of the High Court
- In office 30 July 1973 – 14 May 1974
- Nominated by: Government of Ireland
- Appointed by: Erskine H. Childers

Deputy leader of Fine Gael
- In office 20 April 1972 – 14 September 1977
- Leader: Liam Cosgrave
- Preceded by: New office
- Succeeded by: Peter Barry

Minister for Health
- In office 2 June 1954 – 20 March 1957
- Taoiseach: John A. Costello
- Preceded by: James Ryan
- Succeeded by: Seán MacEntee

Teachta Dála
- In office June 1969 – February 1973
- Constituency: Dublin County South
- In office February 1948 – June 1969
- Constituency: Laois–Offaly

Personal details
- Born: 23 July 1916 Cork, Ireland
- Died: 25 February 2003 (aged 86) Dublin, Ireland
- Resting place: Shanganagh Cemetery, Shankill, Dublin, Ireland
- Party: Fine Gael
- Spouse: Therese Keane (m. 1940)
- Children: 7
- Parent: Thomas F. O'Higgins (father)
- Relatives: Timothy Daniel Sullivan (great-grandfather); Tim Healy (grand-uncle-in-law); Kevin O'Higgins (uncle); Michael O'Higgins (brother); Iseult O'Malley (cousin); Chris O'Malley (cousin)
- Education: University College Dublin; King's Inns

Thomas Francis O'Higgins (23 July 1916 – 25 February 2003) was an Irish Fine Gael politician, barrister and judge who served as Chief Justice of Ireland and a Judge of the Supreme Court from 1974 to 1985, a Judge of the European Court of Justice from 1985 to 1991, a Judge of the High Court from 1973 to 1974, Deputy leader of Fine Gael from 1972 to 1977 and Minister for Health from 1954 to 1957. He also served as a Teachta Dála (TD) from 1948 to 1969.

Part of a new generation of Fine Gael leaders who emerged in the 1950s and 1960s, O'Higgins worked alongside Declan Costello and Garret FitzGerald to liberalise the conservative Fine Gael. In the late 1960s, and early 1970s, O'Higgins twice contested the presidency of Ireland for his party; in his first attempt in 1966, he lost by 1% of the vote against incumbent President Éamon de Valera. In the aftermath, his image was greatly enhanced and he was catapulted into the position of deputy leader of Fine Gael. Despite being the initial favourite to win, O'Higgins lost the 1973 Irish presidential election to Erskine H. Childers.

In 1973, O'Higgins became a High Court judge and the following year was named Chief Justice of Ireland and a Supreme Court judge. Although a liberal politician, O'Higgins was considered by many a conservative judge, given his rulings on matters such as contraceptives and homosexuality. In 1985, O'Higgins became a member of the European Court of Justice following his nomination by Taoiseach Garret FitzGerald and his government. He served on the court in Luxembourg until his retirement in 1991.

== Early life and education ==
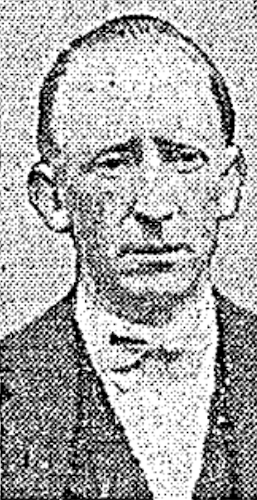
Thomas F. O'Higgins

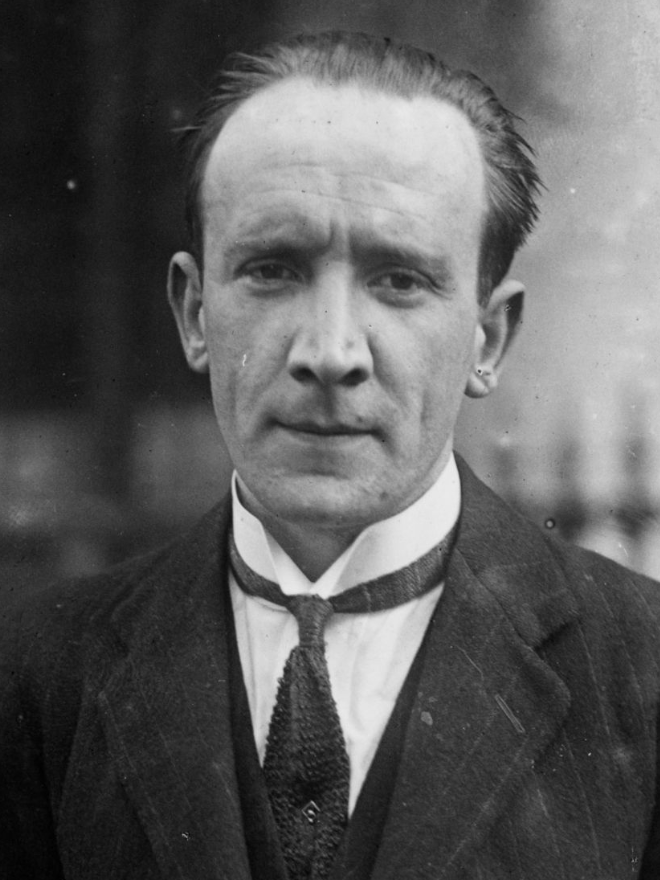
Kevin O'Higgins

Both O'Higgins' father and uncle had been influential politicians in their time, each serving as ministers in their careers.

O'Higgins was born in Cork in 1916, and came from an influential Irish political family: his father was Thomas F. O'Higgins and his uncle was Kevin O'Higgins. Both had been ministers during their political careers and were highly influential on the Cumann na nGaedheal political party which governed Ireland immediately upon independence from the United Kingdom. In 1923, Dr Thomas Higgins (Tom's grandfather) was killed by members of the Anti-Treaty IRA during a raid and in 1927, Kevin O'Higgins was assassinated by Irish republicans in a revenge killing; Kevin O'Higgins had been the Minister for Justice during the Irish Civil War who signed the death warrants of 77 members of the IRA. As a result of these murders, TF O'Higgins (Tom's father) was radicalised and would become a member of the Blueshirts, a radical right-wing paramilitary explicitly opposed to the IRA which eventually merged into Fine Gael, the political successor of Cumann na nGaedheal.

Despite this background, O'Higgins never embraced bitterness or anti-republicanism, and instead espoused a forward-looking politics which sought to advance Irish politics beyond the wounds of the Irish Civil War. Nonetheless, he would always defend his father's membership of the Blueshirts as a requirement for upholding free speech and democracy in Ireland.

O'Higgins was educated at St Mary's College, Dublin, Clongowes Wood College and University College Dublin, where he became auditor of the Literary and Historical Society. He later attended King's Inns. In 1938, he qualified as a barrister and was called to the Bar. In 1954, he was called to the Inner Bar.

== Political career ==
O'Higgins's political career began during the 1943 Irish general election when he unsuccessfully stood on behalf of Fine Gael in the Dublin South constituency. O'Higgins did not stand in the snap general election of 1944, instead choosing to campaign on behalf of his father. However, at this time he founded the "Central Branch" of Fine Gael which gathered younger members of the party together. Additionally, O'Higgins also began to write for the policy review magazine The Forum.

O'Higgins first's successful campaign saw him securing the Leix–Offaly constituency at the 1948 general election, an area once previously represented by his father. On the same day his brother, Michael O'Higgins, was also elected a TD.

In 1950, O'Higgins was one of eight members of the Oireachtas chosen to represent Ireland on the Council of Europe; it was the start of a lifetime interest in European politics.

=== Minister for Health ===
In the Second Inter-Party Government (1954–57), O'Higgins was appointed Minister for Health. He inherited a department mired by the aftermath of the failed Mother and Child Scheme and was now tasked with implementing the 1953 Health Act, which had been introduced by Fianna Fáil. Doing so required O'Higgins to carefully manage both the Irish Medical Association and Fine Gael's coalition partners the Labour Party.

During his period as Minister for Health, he introduced the Voluntary Health Insurance Board (VHI), which brought state-controlled health insurance to Ireland.

=== Ideological reformer ===
In 1956, O'Higgins began to advocate internally in Fine Gael that the party needed to move away from the fiscal conservatism of the minister for finance, Gerard Sweetman, and managed to secure significant initial support. However, his plans were scuppered by the Suez Crisis which began in October 1956 and caused economic slumps around the world. His manoeuvring was further damaged when Clann na Poblachta left the government coalition.

Nonetheless, in the years afterwards, O'Higgins began closely working with fellow second-generation Fine Gael members Garret FitzGerald and Declan Costello to shift Fine Gael ideologically leftwards. The culmination of this was Costello producing a document entitled Towards a Just Society which advocated that Fine Gael adopt social democratic policies. Fine Gael adopted the document as the basis for their election manifesto for the 1965 Irish general election. O'Higgins supported this move; additionally, O'Higgins attempted to win over fellow party members to this move. He also attempted to build bridges with members of the Labour Party.

When Liam Cosgrave succeeded James Dillon as leader of Fine Gael in April 1965, O'Higgins was promoted to party spokesman on finance and economic affairs, replacing the conservative Sweetman. Although the left wing of the party was not in control of the party, O'Higgins move up the ranks represented that their influence was growing.

=== Presidential candidate ===
==== 1966 presidential election ====
In 1966, Ireland was due to hold a presidential election. The election was due to be one of significance, as 1966 marked the 50th anniversary of the Easter Rising of 1916. The incumbent, an ageing Éamon de Valera, himself a veteran of the Easter Rising, was initially widely expected to either win easily or, more probably, stand unopposed. O'Higgins, however, was not content with this and attempted to rally Fine Gael to support the Irish republican Seán MacBride in a presidential bid. Predictably, this idea did not gain much traction, particularly with the more conservative elements of Fine Gael. However, O'Higgins did not give up on the idea that de Valera should be challenged. His next venture was to petition former Taoiseach and Fine Gael stalwart John A. Costello to stand in the election. O'Higgins, however, was not able to convince Costello, who was now nearing the end of his political career, to run.

Having campaigned so hard on the idea that someone must challenge de Valera, eventually party members turned the question back on O'Higgins and suggested he run. He eventually agreed.

O'Higgins' campaign was met with immediate difficulty when, at the outset, de Valera declared that he would not conduct a campaign himself, believing that the office of President should be above party politics. In response, the broadcaster RTÉ decided it could not (or would not), cover O'Higgins campaigning as this would be unbalanced in their view. Fine Gael leader Liam Cosgrove responded by arguing that this was unjust, as although de Valera was not formally campaigning, he regularly appeared on RTÉ radio and television in his capacity as president. RTÉ, however, did not change its position.

O'Higgins carried out a grassroots campaign that saw him attend over 130 public meetings across the Republic of Ireland, covering an estimated 22,000 miles around the country over five weeks, reportedly attending as many as three rallies a night. O'Higgins' campaign manager was his erstwhile political rival Gerald Sweetman, who despite their differences, helped O'Higgins construct a modern strategy. Fine Gael presented O'Higgins and his wife Terry as Irish analogues of John Fitzgerald Kennedy and his wife Jackie Kennedy, emphasising their comparative youth to the elderly de Valera. Campaign ads for O'Higgins prominently featured images of him surrounded by Terry and their seven children in shots designed to evoke the spirit of Camelot that had earned the Kennedys much popularity earlier in the decade. The general thrust of the campaign was that O'Higgins represented the future in contrast to the nostalgia of de Valera. Sweetman described the O'Higgins campaign as expressing "the need for a youthful, forward looking president to personify the real Ireland and what it can best contribute to modern civilisation".

An example of O'Higgins' attempt to emulate modern American politics could be seen on 28 May 1966 when a light aircraft dropped balloons bearing Fine Gael slogans onto the city of Limerick during an O'Higgins motorcade procession. Observing these new tactics, the journalist John Healy of The Irish Times observed, "The Fine Gael tail is up. It is running as it has not run for a long time. It will be an interesting finish indeed".

Polling was not yet a feature of Irish politics in 1966; instead parties still generally relied on their constituency branches to provide a sense of grassroots sentiment. When Fianna Fáil received feedback from their branches about the O'Higgins campaign, they became highly concerned. Although de Valera remained officially committed to not campaigning, he began to make several public appearances on the pretence of commemorating 1916. De Valera's campaign manager was then Minister for Agriculture and future leader of Fianna Fáil, Charles Haughey. Responding to the momentum of the O'Higgins campaign, Haughey announced £5.5 million in spending targeted at farmers just five days before voting began.

The results of the election were agonisingly close; by a margin of just 10,718 votes (1% of the total vote), de Valera managed to secure a victory. Years later, O'Higgins would remark in his autobiography that he felt he had conducted himself well in the race and was glad he was able to maintain his dignity and that of his family. Paraphrasing the Duke of Wellington's remarks about the battle of Waterloo, O'Higgins described the race as "a close run thing". As of 2022, the result of the 1966 contest remains the tightest margin of any Irish presidential election.

==== Deputy leader of Fine Gael ====
Although not victorious in the 1966 election, O'Higgins' image had been greatly enhanced by the contest; at the 1969 Irish general election O'Higgins moved from the Laois–Offaly constituency to the newly created Dublin County South, where he topped the poll. In April 1972, O'Higgins was named the first-ever deputy leader of Fine Gael. In this role, O'Higgins was looked at by some in Fine Gael as an intermediary between the liberal and conservative wings of the party. As deputy leader, O'Higgins made several trips to Northern Ireland in the face of the emerging Troubles and was one of the Fine Gael representatives at the funerals of those killed on Bloody Sunday in 1972.

Anticipating running for president again in May 1973, O'Higgins did not contest the earlier 1973 Irish general election that February. In the aftermath of the general election, his diplomatic skills were once again called upon, as he looked to as a broker between Fine Gael and the Labour Party as they attempted to form a governing coalition, which was ultimately successful.

==== 1973 presidential election ====
In 1973, O'Higgins was again chosen once again as the Fine Gael candidate in the presidential election. This time he faced former Fianna Fáil Tánaiste and Minister, Erskine H. Childers. Childers was elected by 52% to 48%.

== Judicial career ==
Shortly afterwards O'Higgins was appointed a Judge of the High Court. In 1974, after the sudden death of Chief Justice William FitzGerald, O'Higgins, although the most junior High Court judge, was chosen to replace him as Chief Justice of Ireland in the Supreme Court and a judge of the Supreme Court.

After the sudden death of Erskine H. Childers, O'Higgins, in his role as Chief Justice swore in Cearbhall Ó Dálaigh as President of Ireland. He was Chief Justice until 1985 when he was appointed a Judge of the European Court of Justice. He remained there until 1991.

O'Higgins died on 25 February 2003, at the age of 86.

== See also ==
- List of members of the European Court of Justice
- Families in the Oireachtas
- Norris v. Attorney General
- Marleasing SA v La Comercial Internacional de Alimentacion SA

Political offices
| Preceded by James Ryan | Minister for Health; 1954–1957 | Succeeded by Seán MacEntee |
Legal offices
| Preceded by William FitzGerald | Chief Justice of Ireland; 1974–1985 | Succeeded by Thomas Finlay |
Party political offices
| New office | Deputy leader of Fine Gael; 1972–1977 | Succeeded by Peter Barry |

| Dáil | Election | Deputy (Party) | Deputy (Party) | Deputy (Party) | Deputy (Party) | Deputy (Party) |
|---|---|---|---|---|---|---|
| 2nd | 1921 | Joseph Lynch (SF) | Patrick McCartan (SF) | Francis Bulfin (SF) | Kevin O'Higgins (SF) | 4 seats 1921–1923 |
| 3rd | 1922 | William Davin (Lab) | Patrick McCartan (PT-SF) | Francis Bulfin (PT-SF) | Kevin O'Higgins (PT-SF) | 4 seats 1921–1923 |
| 4th | 1923 | William Davin (Lab) | Laurence Brady (Rep) | Francis Bulfin (CnaG) | Patrick Egan (CnaG) | Seán McGuinness (Rep) |
| 4th | 1926 by-election | William Davin (Lab) | Laurence Brady (Rep) | Francis Bulfin (CnaG) | Patrick Egan (CnaG) | James Dwyer (CnaG) |
| 5th | 1927 (Jun) | William Davin (Lab) | Patrick Boland (FF) | Thomas Tynan (FF) | John Gill (Lab) | James Dwyer (CnaG) |
| 6th | 1927 (Sep) | William Davin (Lab) | Patrick Boland (FF) | Patrick Gorry (FF) | William Aird (CnaG) | James Dwyer (CnaG) |
| 7th | 1932 | William Davin (Lab) | Patrick Boland (FF) | Patrick Gorry (FF) | Thomas F. O'Higgins (CnaG) | Eugene O'Brien (CnaG) |
| 8th | 1933 | William Davin (Lab) | Patrick Boland (FF) | Eamon Donnelly (FF) | Thomas F. O'Higgins (CnaG) | Jack Finlay (NCP) |
| 9th | 1937 | William Davin (Lab) | Patrick Boland (FF) | Patrick Gorry (FF) | Thomas F. O'Higgins (FG) | Jack Finlay (FG) |
| 10th | 1938 | William Davin (Lab) | Patrick Boland (FF) | Patrick Gorry (FF) | Thomas F. O'Higgins (FG) | Daniel Hogan (FF) |
| 11th | 1943 | William Davin (Lab) | Patrick Boland (FF) | Patrick Gorry (FF) | Thomas F. O'Higgins (FG) | Oliver J. Flanagan (IMR) |
| 12th | 1944 | William Davin (Lab) | Patrick Boland (FF) | Patrick Gorry (FF) | Thomas F. O'Higgins (FG) | Oliver J. Flanagan (IMR) |
| 13th | 1948 | William Davin (Lab) | Patrick Boland (FF) | Patrick Gorry (FF) | Tom O'Higgins, Jnr (FG) | Oliver J. Flanagan (Ind.) |
| 14th | 1951 | William Davin (Lab) | Patrick Boland (FF) | Peadar Maher (FF) | Tom O'Higgins, Jnr (FG) | Oliver J. Flanagan (Ind.) |
| 15th | 1954 | William Davin (Lab) | Nicholas Egan (FF) | Peadar Maher (FF) | Tom O'Higgins, Jnr (FG) | Oliver J. Flanagan (FG) |
| 15th | 1956 by-election | Kieran Egan (FF) | Nicholas Egan (FF) | Peadar Maher (FF) | Tom O'Higgins, Jnr (FG) | Oliver J. Flanagan (FG) |
| 16th | 1957 | Kieran Egan (FF) | Nicholas Egan (FF) | Peadar Maher (FF) | Tom O'Higgins, Jnr (FG) | Oliver J. Flanagan (FG) |
| 17th | 1961 | Kieran Egan (FF) | Nicholas Egan (FF) | Patrick Lalor (FF) | Tom O'Higgins, Jnr (FG) | Oliver J. Flanagan (FG) |
| 18th | 1965 | Henry Byrne (Lab) | Nicholas Egan (FF) | Patrick Lalor (FF) | Tom O'Higgins, Jnr (FG) | Oliver J. Flanagan (FG) |
| 19th | 1969 | Ger Connolly (FF) | Bernard Cowen (FF) | Patrick Lalor (FF) | Tom Enright (FG) | Oliver J. Flanagan (FG) |
| 20th | 1973 | Ger Connolly (FF) | Charles McDonald (FG) | Patrick Lalor (FF) | Tom Enright (FG) | Oliver J. Flanagan (FG) |
| 21st | 1977 | Ger Connolly (FF) | Bernard Cowen (FF) | Patrick Lalor (FF) | Tom Enright (FG) | Oliver J. Flanagan (FG) |
| 22nd | 1981 | Ger Connolly (FF) | Bernard Cowen (FF) | Liam Hyland (FF) | Tom Enright (FG) | Oliver J. Flanagan (FG) |
| 23rd | 1982 (Feb) | Ger Connolly (FF) | Bernard Cowen (FF) | Liam Hyland (FF) | Tom Enright (FG) | Oliver J. Flanagan (FG) |
| 24th | 1982 (Nov) | Ger Connolly (FF) | Bernard Cowen (FF) | Liam Hyland (FF) | Tom Enright (FG) | Oliver J. Flanagan (FG) |
| 24th | 1984 by-election | Ger Connolly (FF) | Brian Cowen (FF) | Liam Hyland (FF) | Tom Enright (FG) | Oliver J. Flanagan (FG) |
| 25th | 1987 | Ger Connolly (FF) | Brian Cowen (FF) | Liam Hyland (FF) | Tom Enright (FG) | Charles Flanagan (FG) |
| 26th | 1989 | Ger Connolly (FF) | Brian Cowen (FF) | Liam Hyland (FF) | Tom Enright (FG) | Charles Flanagan (FG) |
| 27th | 1992 | Ger Connolly (FF) | Brian Cowen (FF) | Liam Hyland (FF) | Pat Gallagher (Lab) | Charles Flanagan (FG) |
| 28th | 1997 | John Moloney (FF) | Brian Cowen (FF) | Seán Fleming (FF) | Tom Enright (FG) | Charles Flanagan (FG) |
| 29th | 2002 | John Moloney (FF) | Brian Cowen (FF) | Seán Fleming (FF) | Olwyn Enright (FG) | Tom Parlon (PDs) |
| 30th | 2007 | John Moloney (FF) | Brian Cowen (FF) | Seán Fleming (FF) | Olwyn Enright (FG) | Charles Flanagan (FG) |
| 31st | 2011 | Brian Stanley (SF) | Barry Cowen (FF) | Seán Fleming (FF) | Marcella Corcoran Kennedy (FG) | Charles Flanagan (FG) |
| 32nd | 2016 | Constituency abolished. See Laois and Offaly. | | | | |
| 33rd | 2020 | Brian Stanley (SF) | Barry Cowen (FF) | Seán Fleming (FF) | Carol Nolan (Ind.) | Charles Flanagan (FG) |
| 33rd | 2024 | Brian Stanley (SF) | (Vacant) | Seán Fleming (FF) | Carol Nolan (Ind.) | Charles Flanagan (FG) |
| 34th | 2024 | Constituency abolished. See Laois and Offaly. | | | | |

| Dáil | Election | Deputy (Party) | Deputy (Party) | Deputy (Party) |
|---|---|---|---|---|
| 19th | 1969 | Kevin Boland (FF) | Tom O'Higgins (FG) | Richard Burke (FG) |
| 19th | 1970 by-election | Larry McMahon (FG) | Tom O'Higgins (FG) | Richard Burke (FG) |
| 20th | 1973 | Larry McMahon (FG) | Ruairí Brugha (FF) | Richard Burke (FG) |
| 21st | 1977 | John Kelly (FG) | Niall Andrews (FF) | John Horgan (Lab) |
| 22nd | 1981 | Constituency abolished. See Dublin South | | |
