= Thomas F. O'Higgins =

Irish politician (1890–1953)

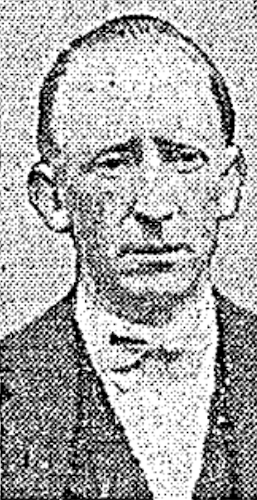
- O'Higgins in 1933

Minister for Industry and Commerce
- In office 7 March 1951 – 13 June 1951
- Taoiseach: John A. Costello
- Preceded by: Daniel Morrissey
- Succeeded by: Seán Lemass

Minister for Defence
- In office 18 February 1948 – 7 March 1951
- Taoiseach: John A. Costello
- Preceded by: Oscar Traynor
- Succeeded by: Seán Mac Eoin

Leader of the Opposition
- In office 11 January 1944 – 9 June 1944
- Taoiseach: Éamon de Valera
- Preceded by: W. T. Cosgrave
- Succeeded by: Richard Mulcahy

Teachta Dála
- In office February 1948 – 1 November 1953
- Constituency: Cork Borough
- In office July 1937 – February 1948
- Constituency: Laois–Offaly
- In office March 1929 – February 1932
- Constituency: Dublin North

Personal details
- Born: 20 November 1890 Stradbally, County Laois, Ireland
- Died: 1 November 1953 (aged 62) Dublin, Ireland
- Party: Fine Gael
- Spouse: Agnes McCarthy (m. 1915)
- Children: 5, including Tom and Michael
- Relatives: Timothy Daniel Sullivan (grandfather); Tim Healy (uncle-in-law); Kevin O'Higgins (brother); Brigid Hogan-O'Higgins (daughter-in-law)
- Education: University College Dublin

Military service
- Branch/service: National Army
- Rank: Colonel
- Battles/wars: Irish Civil War

Thomas Francis O'Higgins (né Higgins) (20 November 1890 – 1 November 1953) was an Irish Fine Gael politician and medical practitioner who served as Minister for Defence from 1948 to 1951, Minister for Industry and Commerce from March 1951 to June 1951 and Leader of the Opposition from January 1944 to June 1944. He served as a Teachta Dála (TD) from 1929 to 1932 and 1937 to 1953.

Following the killing of his father and his brother during the Irish Civil War in the 1920s, he became politically radicalised and joined Cumann na nGaedhael, as well as also briefly becoming the leader of the Blueshirts.

== Background ==
O'Higgins grew up in Stradbally, County Laois, the second son of sixteen children (eight boys, eight girls) of Dr. Thomas Higgins and Anne Sullivan. His mother was the daughter of Timothy Daniel Sullivan, an Irish nationalist, journalist, politician and poet. His father's first cousin, Tim Healy, was one of the most well known Irish MPs in the British House of Commons in the late 19th century and later the first Governor-General of the Irish Free State. Thomas grew up alongside his younger brother Kevin O'Higgins, the fourth son of his parents.

Higgins was educated at Presentation Convent, Stradbally, the Christian Brothers’ schools in Maryborough (now Portlaoise), and Clongowes Wood College in County Kildare before studying medicine at University College Dublin. He qualified as a medical doctor in 1914. It was while practising as a Doctor in Fontstown, County Kildare, in the late 1910s, that he became a local organiser for both Sinn Féin and the Irish Volunteers. In 1919, he was imprisoned twice; first, he was sent to in Mountjoy Prison, Dublin, and then the Curragh Camp, County Kildare, for soliciting subscriptions to the first Dáil Éireann loan.

Higgins's status continued to grow; he became a Town Commissioner for Portlaoise in 1920, and was later arrested again for leading the people of Portlaoise in a protest after the death of Terence MacSwiney. As a result, he was sent to Abercorn Barracks in County Down, during which time his home back in Portlaoise was turned into an Officers' Mess for the Black and Tans after they evicted his wife and children.

In 1921, he added the prefix "O" to his surname, a common trend at the time, particularly amongst those involved in the Gaelic League. Those adding O to their surnames believed they were simply restoring what had been previously removed during Anglicisation in previous generations.

== Military career ==
O'Higgins supported the Anglo-Irish Treaty and enlisted in the National Army of the Irish Free State in 1922 during the Irish Civil War. There he was appointed captain in the medical corps, and subsequently became Medical Corps Deputy Commander and Director of Medical Services with the rank of colonel.

== Killing of his father and brother ==
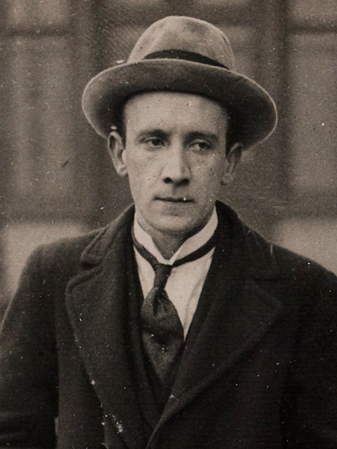
O'Higgins' younger brother Kevin O'Higgins was Minister of Justice when he was assassinated in 1927 in retaliation for confirming death sentences of captured Republicans during the Irish Civil War.

On 11 February 1923, his father was killed by the Anti-Treaty IRA during a raid on his fathers' home. On 10 July 1927, his brother Kevin O'Higgins, the Minister for Justice, was assassinated by the IRA. During the Civil War, as Minister for Justice, Kevin had brought in severe measures to crack down on the IRA, including the introduction of the death penalty. Kevin confirmed the death sentences of 77 captured Republicans, including that of Rory O'Connor, who had been the best man at Kevin's wedding. The deaths of both Thomas Senior and Kevin were believed to have been in retaliation for those death sentences.

== Political career ==
O'Higgins resigned his army commission to stand as a Cumann na nGaedheal candidate for Dublin North at the 14 March 1929 by-election. He won a narrow victory over Fianna Fáil's Oscar Traynor.

At the 1932 general election, he switched constituencies and was elected for Leix–Offaly. This was the beginning of a sixteen-year stint as a TD for Laois–Offaly.

=== With the Blueshirts ===
The political atmosphere of the early 1930s in Ireland was becoming increasingly divisive. The 1920s had seen the Labour Party as the main opposition in the Dáil but in 1927 Fianna Fáil dropped their abstentionism and entered the chamber, becoming the main opposition, and were much more vocally opposed to Cumann na nGaedhael than Labour had been. Fianna Fáil had been pressured to drop their abstentionism partially after Kevin O'Higgins as Minister for Justice brought forward a law that requiring all political candidates to swear that they would take the Oath of Allegiance if elected to the Dáil. Fianna Fáil eventually agreed to do so after dismissing the Oath as an "Empty formula". The onset of the Great Depression further increased tensions as the economy tanked.

It was the midset of this that Fianna Fáil won the 1932 general election. Upon entry into government, Fianna Fáil set about releasing many of the political prisoners arrested by Cumann na nGaedhael in the preceding years. As a result, many members of the IRA were freed. The IRA and many released prisoners, who held Cumann na nGaedhael in contempt, began a "campaign of unrelenting hostility" against those associated with the former Cumann na nGaedheal government. Frank Ryan, one of the most prominent socialists in 1930s Ireland, active in the IRA and Republican Congress, declared "as long as we have fists and boots, there will be no free speech for traitors". As a consequence, many Cumann na nGaedhael public meeting began to be disrupted by IRA members.

In response, former members of the National Army and supporters of the Cumann na nGaedhael party formed the Army Comrades Association (ACA), better known as the Blueshirts. The organisation began acting as stewards at Cumann na nGaedhael meetings and began engaging in street fighting with IRA members. In August 1932, O'Higgins was invited to become the leader of the ACA, which he accepted. O'Higgins was joined in the organisation by fellow Cumann na nGaedhael TDs Ernest Blythe, Patrick McGilligan and Desmond Fitzgerald. It was under O'Higgins direction that the ACA went from an association of ex-National Army members into a crusading right-wing movement hitched to Cumann na nGaedhael. O'Higgins asked ACA members to defend the right to free speech and assembly against "Republican thuggery", and to defend Christian values against "Communist influences" he suggested were entering Ireland via the IRA.

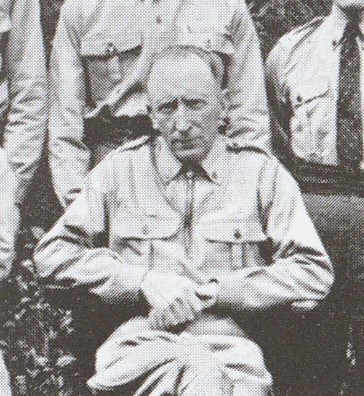
Thomas F. O'Higgins photographed in uniform with other Blueshirt officers.

In 1933, Fianna Fáil called a surprise election which saw them consolidate their power in the Dáil. That spring, O'Higgins handed over leadership of the ACA to Eoin O'Duffy, the former Garda Commissioner who had just been sacked by Éamon de Valera. O'Duffy took the ACA into a more radically hardline direction, renaming it the "National Guard" and adopting many elements of European Fascism such as the Roman straight-arm salute, uniforms and huge public rallies.

In August 1933, Fianna Fáil banned the National Guard following an aborted march on Dublin. As a result, in September the National Guard, the National Centre Party and Cumann na nGaedhael merged into one new party, Fine Gael. O'Duffy was named leader, with WT Cosgrave of CnaG replaced to avoid the idea that the new party was merely a continuation of CnaG. The National Guard, now known as the Young Ireland Association, was to act as a youth wing for the party. O'Higgins was key in battering the new alliance. Representing the National Guard in the negotiation phase, he became part of Fine Gael's first national executive and sat on its Dáil front bench.

In September 1933, the Gardaí raided the National Guard's Dublin headquarters. In response, O'Higgins and Desmond FitzGerald led other Fine Gael TDs in wearing the blue shirt of the National Guard in the Dáil chamber. In February 1934, at Fine Gael's first national convention, O'Higgins denounced Fianna Fáil as ‘the vanguard of the communist policy here’, and called Éamon de Valera an ‘arch-communist agent’. O'Higgins was amongst the Fine Gael leaders more open to the introduction of Corporatism policies being pushed by members of the Blueshirts such as James Hogan, Michael Tierney and Ernest Blythe.

=== In Fine Gael ===
O'Duffy lasted only a year as leader before being replaced by Cosgrave. O'Higgins was made vice-president of the party and in October 1936 reorganised the Blueshirts, abolishing their status as a semi-independent grouping within Fine Gael and made their officers directly responsible to the party's standing committee. It marked the general trend of winding down the Blueshirts and merging them into the mainstream of the party.

During World War II, O'Higgins defended the right of James Dillon to speak out against the party's stance of supporting Irish neutrality alongside Fianna Fáil. Dillon wished to see Ireland join the Allies against the Axis powers.

He became parliamentary leader of Fine Gael in 1944, while the former leader, Richard Mulcahy, was attempting to get elected to Seanad Éireann and retain his position.

=== Return to government ===
During the 1948 general election, O'Higgins left the Laois–Offaly constituency in order to allow his son Tom O'Higgins to successful stand there. O'Higgins stood for Cork Borough instead. In the same election, another son Michael O'Higgins was also elected for Dublin South-West.

In 1948, he joined the government of John A. Costello as Minister for Defence. He served as Minister for Industry and Commerce from March 1951 to June 1951.

O'Higgins died while still in office in 1953. On 3 March 1954, Stephen Barrett of Fine Gael won the by-election for the vacant seat.

== Personal life ==
On 17 October 1915, O'Higgins married Agnes McCarthy of Cork. They had four sons and one daughter together.

== See also ==
- Families in the Oireachtas
- Auditors of the Literary and Historical Society (University College Dublin)

Political offices
| Preceded by W. T. Cosgrave | Leader of the Opposition; January–June 1944 (acting) | Succeeded by Richard Mulcahy |
| Preceded by Oscar Traynor | Minister for Defence; 1948–1951 | Succeeded by Seán Mac Eoin |
| Preceded by Daniel Morrissey | Minister for Industry and Commerce; March–June 1951 | Succeeded by Seán Lemass |

| Dáil | Election | Deputy (Party) | Deputy (Party) | Deputy (Party) | Deputy (Party) | Deputy (Party) | Deputy (Party) | Deputy (Party) | Deputy (Party) |
|---|---|---|---|---|---|---|---|---|---|
| 4th | 1923 | Alfie Byrne (Ind.) | Francis Cahill (CnaG) | Margaret Collins-O'Driscoll (CnaG) | Seán McGarry (CnaG) | William Hewat (BP) | Richard Mulcahy (CnaG) | Seán T. O'Kelly (Rep) | Ernie O'Malley (Rep) |
| 4th | 1925 by-election | Alfie Byrne (Ind.) | Patrick Leonard (CnaG) | Margaret Collins-O'Driscoll (CnaG) | Oscar Traynor (Rep) | William Hewat (BP) | Richard Mulcahy (CnaG) | Seán T. O'Kelly (Rep) | Ernie O'Malley (Rep) |
| 5th | 1927 (Jun) | Alfie Byrne (Ind.) | John Byrne (CnaG) | Margaret Collins-O'Driscoll (CnaG) | Oscar Traynor (SF) | Denis Cullen (Lab) | Richard Mulcahy (CnaG) | Seán T. O'Kelly (FF) | Kathleen Clarke (FF) |
| 6th | 1927 (Sep) | Alfie Byrne (Ind.) | John Byrne (CnaG) | Margaret Collins-O'Driscoll (CnaG) | Patrick Leonard (CnaG) | James Larkin (IWL) | Richard Mulcahy (CnaG) | Seán T. O'Kelly (FF) | Eamonn Cooney (FF) |
| 6th | 1928 by-election | Alfie Byrne (Ind.) | John Byrne (CnaG) | Margaret Collins-O'Driscoll (CnaG) | Patrick Leonard (CnaG) | Vincent Rice (CnaG) | Richard Mulcahy (CnaG) | Seán T. O'Kelly (FF) | Eamonn Cooney (FF) |
| 6th | 1929 by-election | Thomas F. O'Higgins (CnaG) | John Byrne (CnaG) | Margaret Collins-O'Driscoll (CnaG) | Patrick Leonard (CnaG) | Vincent Rice (CnaG) | Richard Mulcahy (CnaG) | Seán T. O'Kelly (FF) | Eamonn Cooney (FF) |
| 7th | 1932 | Alfie Byrne (Ind.) | John Byrne (CnaG) | Margaret Collins-O'Driscoll (CnaG) | Oscar Traynor (FF) | Cormac Breathnach (FF) | Richard Mulcahy (CnaG) | Seán T. O'Kelly (FF) | Eamonn Cooney (FF) |
| 8th | 1933 | Alfie Byrne (Ind.) | Patrick Belton (CnaG) | Vincent Rice (CnaG) | Oscar Traynor (FF) | Cormac Breathnach (FF) | Richard Mulcahy (CnaG) | Seán T. O'Kelly (FF) | Eamonn Cooney (FF) |
| 9th | 1937 | Constituency abolished. See Dublin North-East and Dublin North-West | | | | | | | |

| Dáil | Election | Deputy (Party) | Deputy (Party) | Deputy (Party) | Deputy (Party) |
|---|---|---|---|---|---|
| 22nd | 1981 | Ray Burke (FF) | John Boland (FG) | Nora Owen (FG) | 3 seats 1981–1992 |
| 23rd | 1982 (Feb) | Ray Burke (FF) | John Boland (FG) | Nora Owen (FG) | 3 seats 1981–1992 |
| 24th | 1982 (Nov) | Ray Burke (FF) | John Boland (FG) | Nora Owen (FG) | 3 seats 1981–1992 |
| 25th | 1987 | Ray Burke (FF) | John Boland (FG) | G. V. Wright (FF) | 3 seats 1981–1992 |
| 26th | 1989 | Ray Burke (FF) | Nora Owen (FG) | Seán Ryan (Lab) | 3 seats 1981–1992 |
| 27th | 1992 | Ray Burke (FF) | Nora Owen (FG) | Seán Ryan (Lab) | Trevor Sargent (GP) |
| 28th | 1997 | Ray Burke (FF) | Nora Owen (FG) | G. V. Wright (FF) | Trevor Sargent (GP) |
| 28th | 1998 by-election | Seán Ryan (Lab) | Nora Owen (FG) | G. V. Wright (FF) | Trevor Sargent (GP) |
| 29th | 2002 | Seán Ryan (Lab) | Jim Glennon (FF) | G. V. Wright (FF) | Trevor Sargent (GP) |
| 30th | 2007 | James Reilly (FG) | Michael Kennedy (FF) | Darragh O'Brien (FF) | Trevor Sargent (GP) |
| 31st | 2011 | James Reilly (FG) | Alan Farrell (FG) | Brendan Ryan (Lab) | Clare Daly (SP) |
| 32nd | 2016 | Constituency abolished. See Dublin Fingal | | | |

| Dáil | Election | Deputy (Party) | Deputy (Party) | Deputy (Party) | Deputy (Party) | Deputy (Party) |
|---|---|---|---|---|---|---|
| 2nd | 1921 | Liam de Róiste (SF) | Mary MacSwiney (SF) | Donal O'Callaghan (SF) | J. J. Walsh (SF) | 4 seats 1921–1923 |
| 3rd | 1922 | Liam de Róiste (PT-SF) | Mary MacSwiney (AT-SF) | Robert Day (Lab) | J. J. Walsh (PT-SF) | 4 seats 1921–1923 |
| 4th | 1923 | Richard Beamish (Ind.) | Mary MacSwiney (Rep) | Andrew O'Shaughnessy (Ind.) | J. J. Walsh (CnaG) | Alfred O'Rahilly (CnaG) |
| 4th | 1924 by-election | Richard Beamish (Ind.) | Mary MacSwiney (Rep) | Andrew O'Shaughnessy (Ind.) | J. J. Walsh (CnaG) | Michael Egan (CnaG) |
| 5th | 1927 (Jun) | John Horgan (NL) | Seán French (FF) | Richard Anthony (Lab) | J. J. Walsh (CnaG) | Barry Egan (CnaG) |
| 6th | 1927 (Sep) | W. T. Cosgrave (CnaG) | Seán French (FF) | Richard Anthony (Lab) | Hugo Flinn (FF) | Barry Egan (CnaG) |
| 7th | 1932 | W. T. Cosgrave (CnaG) | Thomas Dowdall (FF) | Richard Anthony (Ind.) | Hugo Flinn (FF) | William Desmond (CnaG) |
| 8th | 1933 | W. T. Cosgrave (CnaG) | Thomas Dowdall (FF) | Richard Anthony (Ind.) | Hugo Flinn (FF) | William Desmond (CnaG) |
| 9th | 1937 | W. T. Cosgrave (FG) | Thomas Dowdall (FF) | Richard Anthony (Ind.) | Hugo Flinn (FF) | 4 seats 1937–1948 |
| 10th | 1938 | W. T. Cosgrave (FG) | Thomas Dowdall (FF) | James Hickey (Lab) | Hugo Flinn (FF) | 4 seats 1937–1948 |
| 11th | 1943 | W. T. Cosgrave (FG) | Frank Daly (FF) | Richard Anthony (Ind.) | Séamus Fitzgerald (FF) | 4 seats 1937–1948 |
| 12th | 1944 | William Dwyer (Ind.) | Frank Daly (FF) | Richard Anthony (Ind.) | Walter Furlong (FF) | 4 seats 1937–1948 |
| 12th | 1946 by-election | Patrick McGrath (FF) | Frank Daly (FF) | Richard Anthony (Ind.) | Walter Furlong (FF) | 4 seats 1937–1948 |
| 13th | 1948 | Patrick McGrath (FF) | Michael Sheehan (Ind.) | James Hickey (NLP) | Jack Lynch (FF) | Thomas F. O'Higgins (FG) |
| 14th | 1951 | Patrick McGrath (FF) | Seán McCarthy (FF) | James Hickey (Lab) | Jack Lynch (FF) | Thomas F. O'Higgins (FG) |
| 14th | 1954 by-election | Patrick McGrath (FF) | Seán McCarthy (FF) | James Hickey (Lab) | Jack Lynch (FF) | Stephen Barrett (FG) |
| 15th | 1954 | Patrick McGrath (FF) | Anthony Barry (FG) | Seán Casey (Lab) | Jack Lynch (FF) | Stephen Barrett (FG) |
| 15th | 1956 by-election | John Galvin (FF) | Anthony Barry (FG) | Seán Casey (Lab) | Jack Lynch (FF) | Stephen Barrett (FG) |
| 16th | 1957 | John Galvin (FF) | Gus Healy (FF) | Seán Casey (Lab) | Jack Lynch (FF) | Stephen Barrett (FG) |
| 17th | 1961 | John Galvin (FF) | Anthony Barry (FG) | Seán Casey (Lab) | Jack Lynch (FF) | Stephen Barrett (FG) |
| 17th | 1964 by-election | Sheila Galvin (FF) | Anthony Barry (FG) | Seán Casey (Lab) | Jack Lynch (FF) | Stephen Barrett (FG) |
| 18th | 1965 | Gus Healy (FF) | Pearse Wyse (FF) | Seán Casey (Lab) | Jack Lynch (FF) | Stephen Barrett (FG) |
| 18th | 1967 by-election | Gus Healy (FF) | Pearse Wyse (FF) | Seán French (FF) | Jack Lynch (FF) | Stephen Barrett (FG) |
| 19th | 1969 | Constituency abolished. See Cork City North-West and Cork City South-East | | | | |

| Dáil | Election | Deputy (Party) | Deputy (Party) | Deputy (Party) | Deputy (Party) | Deputy (Party) |
|---|---|---|---|---|---|---|
| 2nd | 1921 | Joseph Lynch (SF) | Patrick McCartan (SF) | Francis Bulfin (SF) | Kevin O'Higgins (SF) | 4 seats 1921–1923 |
| 3rd | 1922 | William Davin (Lab) | Patrick McCartan (PT-SF) | Francis Bulfin (PT-SF) | Kevin O'Higgins (PT-SF) | 4 seats 1921–1923 |
| 4th | 1923 | William Davin (Lab) | Laurence Brady (Rep) | Francis Bulfin (CnaG) | Patrick Egan (CnaG) | Seán McGuinness (Rep) |
| 4th | 1926 by-election | William Davin (Lab) | Laurence Brady (Rep) | Francis Bulfin (CnaG) | Patrick Egan (CnaG) | James Dwyer (CnaG) |
| 5th | 1927 (Jun) | William Davin (Lab) | Patrick Boland (FF) | Thomas Tynan (FF) | John Gill (Lab) | James Dwyer (CnaG) |
| 6th | 1927 (Sep) | William Davin (Lab) | Patrick Boland (FF) | Patrick Gorry (FF) | William Aird (CnaG) | James Dwyer (CnaG) |
| 7th | 1932 | William Davin (Lab) | Patrick Boland (FF) | Patrick Gorry (FF) | Thomas F. O'Higgins (CnaG) | Eugene O'Brien (CnaG) |
| 8th | 1933 | William Davin (Lab) | Patrick Boland (FF) | Eamon Donnelly (FF) | Thomas F. O'Higgins (CnaG) | Jack Finlay (NCP) |
| 9th | 1937 | William Davin (Lab) | Patrick Boland (FF) | Patrick Gorry (FF) | Thomas F. O'Higgins (FG) | Jack Finlay (FG) |
| 10th | 1938 | William Davin (Lab) | Patrick Boland (FF) | Patrick Gorry (FF) | Thomas F. O'Higgins (FG) | Daniel Hogan (FF) |
| 11th | 1943 | William Davin (Lab) | Patrick Boland (FF) | Patrick Gorry (FF) | Thomas F. O'Higgins (FG) | Oliver J. Flanagan (IMR) |
| 12th | 1944 | William Davin (Lab) | Patrick Boland (FF) | Patrick Gorry (FF) | Thomas F. O'Higgins (FG) | Oliver J. Flanagan (IMR) |
| 13th | 1948 | William Davin (Lab) | Patrick Boland (FF) | Patrick Gorry (FF) | Tom O'Higgins, Jnr (FG) | Oliver J. Flanagan (Ind.) |
| 14th | 1951 | William Davin (Lab) | Patrick Boland (FF) | Peadar Maher (FF) | Tom O'Higgins, Jnr (FG) | Oliver J. Flanagan (Ind.) |
| 15th | 1954 | William Davin (Lab) | Nicholas Egan (FF) | Peadar Maher (FF) | Tom O'Higgins, Jnr (FG) | Oliver J. Flanagan (FG) |
| 15th | 1956 by-election | Kieran Egan (FF) | Nicholas Egan (FF) | Peadar Maher (FF) | Tom O'Higgins, Jnr (FG) | Oliver J. Flanagan (FG) |
| 16th | 1957 | Kieran Egan (FF) | Nicholas Egan (FF) | Peadar Maher (FF) | Tom O'Higgins, Jnr (FG) | Oliver J. Flanagan (FG) |
| 17th | 1961 | Kieran Egan (FF) | Nicholas Egan (FF) | Patrick Lalor (FF) | Tom O'Higgins, Jnr (FG) | Oliver J. Flanagan (FG) |
| 18th | 1965 | Henry Byrne (Lab) | Nicholas Egan (FF) | Patrick Lalor (FF) | Tom O'Higgins, Jnr (FG) | Oliver J. Flanagan (FG) |
| 19th | 1969 | Ger Connolly (FF) | Bernard Cowen (FF) | Patrick Lalor (FF) | Tom Enright (FG) | Oliver J. Flanagan (FG) |
| 20th | 1973 | Ger Connolly (FF) | Charles McDonald (FG) | Patrick Lalor (FF) | Tom Enright (FG) | Oliver J. Flanagan (FG) |
| 21st | 1977 | Ger Connolly (FF) | Bernard Cowen (FF) | Patrick Lalor (FF) | Tom Enright (FG) | Oliver J. Flanagan (FG) |
| 22nd | 1981 | Ger Connolly (FF) | Bernard Cowen (FF) | Liam Hyland (FF) | Tom Enright (FG) | Oliver J. Flanagan (FG) |
| 23rd | 1982 (Feb) | Ger Connolly (FF) | Bernard Cowen (FF) | Liam Hyland (FF) | Tom Enright (FG) | Oliver J. Flanagan (FG) |
| 24th | 1982 (Nov) | Ger Connolly (FF) | Bernard Cowen (FF) | Liam Hyland (FF) | Tom Enright (FG) | Oliver J. Flanagan (FG) |
| 24th | 1984 by-election | Ger Connolly (FF) | Brian Cowen (FF) | Liam Hyland (FF) | Tom Enright (FG) | Oliver J. Flanagan (FG) |
| 25th | 1987 | Ger Connolly (FF) | Brian Cowen (FF) | Liam Hyland (FF) | Tom Enright (FG) | Charles Flanagan (FG) |
| 26th | 1989 | Ger Connolly (FF) | Brian Cowen (FF) | Liam Hyland (FF) | Tom Enright (FG) | Charles Flanagan (FG) |
| 27th | 1992 | Ger Connolly (FF) | Brian Cowen (FF) | Liam Hyland (FF) | Pat Gallagher (Lab) | Charles Flanagan (FG) |
| 28th | 1997 | John Moloney (FF) | Brian Cowen (FF) | Seán Fleming (FF) | Tom Enright (FG) | Charles Flanagan (FG) |
| 29th | 2002 | John Moloney (FF) | Brian Cowen (FF) | Seán Fleming (FF) | Olwyn Enright (FG) | Tom Parlon (PDs) |
| 30th | 2007 | John Moloney (FF) | Brian Cowen (FF) | Seán Fleming (FF) | Olwyn Enright (FG) | Charles Flanagan (FG) |
| 31st | 2011 | Brian Stanley (SF) | Barry Cowen (FF) | Seán Fleming (FF) | Marcella Corcoran Kennedy (FG) | Charles Flanagan (FG) |
| 32nd | 2016 | Constituency abolished. See Laois and Offaly. | | | | |
| 33rd | 2020 | Brian Stanley (SF) | Barry Cowen (FF) | Seán Fleming (FF) | Carol Nolan (Ind.) | Charles Flanagan (FG) |
| 33rd | 2024 | Brian Stanley (SF) | (Vacant) | Seán Fleming (FF) | Carol Nolan (Ind.) | Charles Flanagan (FG) |
| 34th | 2024 | Constituency abolished. See Laois and Offaly. | | | | |
