= UCD School of Medicine =

Program of University College, Dublin

Coordinates: 53.30914°N 6.22683°W

- Type: Medical school
- Established: 1854; 172 years ago (as Catholic University Medical School)
- Affiliations: Universitas 21; Universitas 21 Health Sciences Group; International Association of Universities; Worldwide Universities Network
- Dean: Professor Patrick (Paddy) Mallon
- Administrative staff: 165
- Undergraduates: 2,154
- Postgraduates: 699
- Doctoral students: 194
- Location: Dublin, Ireland
- Campus: Belfield, Dublin Mater Misericordiae University Hospital St. Vincent's University Hospital
- Website: Official website

The UCD School of Medicine (Scoil an Leighis UCD) at University College Dublin, Ireland, was founded in 1854. At undergraduate level, the school offers programmes in Medicine MB BCh BAO (undergraduate and graduate entry), BSc Biomedical Health and Life Sciences, and the BSc Radiography. At graduate level, the school UCD offers over 40 programmes for health care professionals.

Health Sciences building, Belfield campus, UCD.

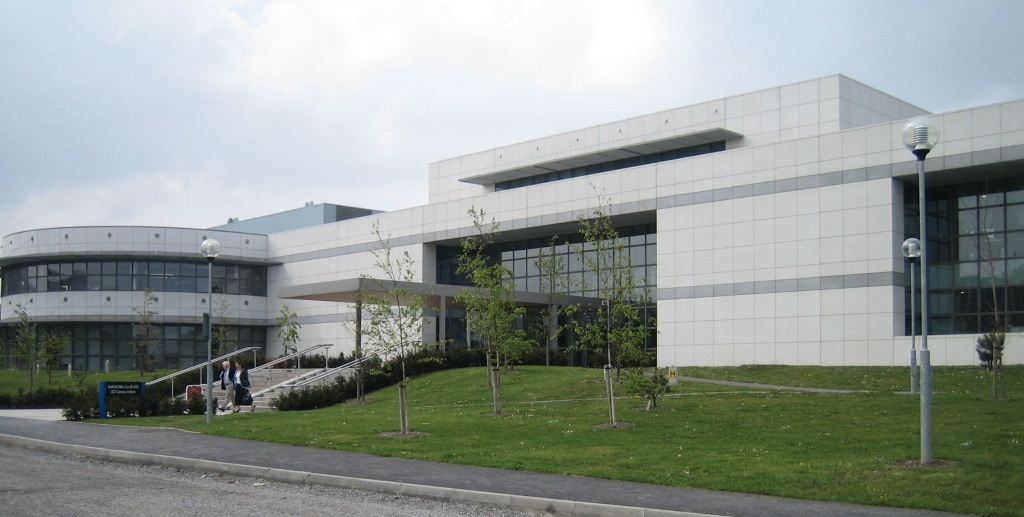
The Conway Institute, Belfield campus, UCD.

== History ==
The Catholic University Medical School was founded in 1854 and in 1908 it became the medical faculty of UCD. After 75 years at its original location on Cecilia Street, it moved to Earlsfort Terrace. In 2007 UCD moved again, to Belfield campus. The Health Science building sits adjacent to the Conway Institute (a biomedical and biomolecular research centre), Ireland's Centre for Research in Infectious Diseases, and the Centre for Synthesis and Chemical Biology. The UCD National Virus Reference Laboratory is also located on the Belfield campus.

The University College Dublin degree in Radiography is the oldest in Europe with the first graduates being conferred in 1994. It is the only Diagnostic Imaging Programme in the Republic of Ireland.

== Medical school curriculum ==
A pre-medicine year is completed by approximately 85% of undergraduate entry students. Thereafter, undergraduate entry medical students embark upon a three-year pre-clinical programme, followed by their final two years of clinical training in one of the affiliated teaching hospitals, either St. Vincent’s University Hospital or the Mater Misericordiae University Hospital. Graduate entry medical students study a 2-year-pre-clinical programme and study the final two years in the affiliated hospitals. Both graduate and undergraduate students complete specialist training rotations at The National Maternity Hospital, the Coombe Women & Infants University Hospital, Children's Health Ireland at Crumlin, and Children's Health Ireland at Temple Street. Upon graduation students are awarded bachelor's degrees in medicine, surgery and obstetrics.

In September 2005 there was a restructuring of the medical programme in the systems-based model, as part of a university wide implementation.

UCD has connections with several prestigious North American institutions, allowing medical students to participate in funded electives at Harvard Medical School, Washington University in St. Louis, University of Pennsylvania, University of Toronto and the University of British Columbia. The medical school also has a twinning medical programme with the RCSI & UCD Malaysia Campus.

== Admissions and rankings ==
=== National ===
In 2020, of the five medical schools offering medical degrees to undergraduates in the Republic of Ireland, UCD had the highest required CAO points to gain entry, at 737. In 2021 points required for undergraduate entry into UCD Medicine rose from 737 to 743, tied with Trinity for the highest requirement. Likewise in 2022, UCD once again was tied with Trinity for highest required CAO points at 743, to study medicine in Ireland. In 2023 the points requirement for UCD medicine was 736, making it the second highest points requirement behind Trinity at 741. Once again in 2024, UCD medicine had the second highest points requirement at 735, only behind Trinity at 738. In 2025 the CAO points requirement for medicine rose to 738. The 2026 CAO points requirement (including HPAT) for medicine at UCD remained 738 only behind Trinity at 741.

=== International ===
In the subject listed as "Medicine", the 2023 QS World University Rankings gave University College Dublin a ranking of 151–200 of 682 schools ranked. The following year UCD placed 167th among 720 schools ranked and 172nd among 850 schools in 2025. The US News 2024 "Best Global Universities for Clinical Medicine" rankings gave UCD a position of 216 among 1,000 schools scored. In the 2025 Times Higher Education World University Rankings UCD ranked 176–200 in the category "Medical and Health".

For American applicants who wish to enter the four-year graduate entry medical program, the minimum GPA required from a completed undergraduate degree program is 3.0 and the MCAT must be a 503 or higher.

== Global graduate destinations ==
UCD students have secured residencies at (but not limited to) the following training programmes:

- Baylor College of Medicine – Texas, US
- Beth Israel Deaconess Medical Center – Massachusetts, US
- Cleveland Clinic – Ohio, US
- Columbia University Irving Medical Center – New York, US
- Dartmouth–Hitchcock Medical Center – New Hampshire, US
- Emory University Hospital – Atlanta, US
- Hospital of the University of Pennsylvania – Philadelphia, US
- Massachusetts General Hospital, Harvard Medical School – Boston, Massachusetts, US
- Mayo Clinic College of Medicine and Science – Minnesota, US
- McMaster University Medical School – Hamilton, Ontario, Canada
- Monash Health – Melbourne, Australia
- NYU Langone Health – New York, US
- Pennsylvania Hospital, University of Pennsylvania Health System – Philadelphia, US
- Queen Elizabeth II Medical Centre, University of Western Australia - Perth, Australia
- Stanford International Residency Training Programme – Stanford, California
- Singapore General Hospital – Singapore
- University of British Columbia – Vancouver, Canada
- University of Melbourne – Melbourne, Australia
- University of Toronto – Toronto, Canada
- Westmead Hospital – Sydney, NSW, Australia
- Yale New Haven Hospital – Connecticut, US

== Notable alumni ==
Notable UCD alumni and former students of the School of Medicine include:

- Peter Boylan – Obstetrician, former master of the National Maternity Hospital, Dublin
- Hugh Brady – President of UCD, President of Imperial College London
- Barry Bresnihan – Rheumatologist, Irish rugby international, British and Irish Lion
- Mark English – 800 m bronze medalist at the 2014 European Athletics Championships
- Garret A. FitzGerald – Professor of translational medicine and Therapeutics and chair of the department of pharmacology at the Perelman School of Medicine of the University of Pennsylvania. His work contributed substantially to the development of low-dose aspirin to prevent heart attacks and strokes. His work showing that selective COX-2 inhibitors depress the production of prostacyclin in the endothelium, thereby increasing cardiovascular risk, was instrumental in the withdrawal of Vioxx (rofecoxib) from the U.S. market in 2004
- Michael Fitzsimons – 8-time All-Ireland Senior Football Champion for Dublin
- Noëlle Healy – 4-time All-Ireland Senior Ladies' Football Champion
- Tony Holohan – Chief Medical Officer for Ireland
- Maura Lynch – Catholic nun, doctor, women's rights advocate, founding member of the Association of Surgeons in Uganda, North–South Prize recipient
- Jack McCaffrey – five-time All-Ireland Senior Football Champion for Dublin
- Gerry McEntee – two-time All-Ireland Senior Football Champion for Meath, Consultant Hepatobiliary and pancreatic surgeon at the Mater Misericordiae University Hospital
- Eilis McGovern – 168th President of the Royal College of Surgeons in Ireland and first female President of any surgical Royal College in the world
- Patrick Meenan – President of the Medical Council of Ireland, lawyer, president of the Royal Zoological Society of Ireland, acting President of UCD and dean of the faculty of medicine in University College Dublin
- Bill Mulcahy – Irish rugby international, British and Irish Lion
- Josh Murphy – Connacht and Leinster Rugby player
- Seán Murphy – three-time All-Ireland Senior Football Champion for Kerry
- Lucy O'Brien – Missionary nun, medical doctor
- Paul O'Byrne – Pulmonologist, Dean and Vice President-elect of the Faculty of Health Sciences and Dean of the Michael G. DeGroote School of Medicine at McMaster University, former Chair of Respiratory Medicine at McMaster University Medical School
- Brid Ryan – biomedical scientist and cancer researcher
- Mona Tyndall – medical doctor and missionary nun in Nigeria and Zambia

== List of deans ==
Below is a list of the deans of the UCD School of Medicine, Cecilia Street School of Medicine and the Catholic University Medical School:

Deans
No.	Name	Years
1	Ambrose Birmingham (Registrar)	1890–1905
2	Francis John Boxwell Quinlan	1889–1890
3	Christopher Nixon	1900–1905
4	Denis Coffey	1905–1908
5	Edward Patrick McLoughlin	1909–1941
6	James Malachy O'Connor	1941–1956
7	John A. McGrath	1956–1957
8	Edward Keenan	1957–1962
9	Thomas Murphy	1962–1964
10	Denis K. Donovan	1965–1973
11	Patrick Meenan	1973–1985
12	Geoffrey Bourke	1985–1991
13	Ronan O'Regan	1991–2000
14	Muiris Fitzgerald	2000–2006
15	William Powderly	2006–2013
16	Patrick Murray	2013–2018
17	Michael Keane	2018–2025
18	Paddy Mallon	2025–present

== See also ==
- Mater Misericordiae University Hospital
- St. Vincent's University Hospital
- Dublin Hospitals Rugby Cup
