= Patrick Cosgrave =

Irish journalist, writer, and advisor to Margaret Thatcher (1941–2001)

- Born: Patrick John Francis Cosgrave; 28 September 1941; Dublin, Ireland
- Died: 16 September 2001 (aged 59); London, England
- Occupations: Journalist; writer

Patrick John Francis Cosgrave (28 September 1941 – 16 September 2001) was a British-Irish journalist and writer. A staunch supporter of the Conservative Party, he was an adviser to Margaret Thatcher whilst she was Leader of the Opposition.

== Early life and education ==
Patrick Cosgrave was the only child of an improvident builder, who died from cancer when Patrick was ten, leaving his mother impoverished. She took work as a cleaner in the Chapel Royal in Dublin Castle. Cosgrave rebelled against the Roman Catholic piety of his mother and his teachers at St. Vincent's C.B.S. in Glasnevin. He acquired a love of British history aged 14, while reading as a convalescent from rheumatic fever. He read works by Rudyard Kipling, Winston Churchill, and Lawrence of Arabia.

At University College Dublin (UCD), he was influenced by Desmond Williams, professor of history. He embraced the epithet "West Brit"; at a debate, when an opponent accused him of being "to the Right of Douglas-Home", he retorted that he was "to the Right of Lord Salisbury". He claimed that his grandfather, a warden in Mountjoy Prison, had beaten up Kevin Barry, a Republican rebel executed in 1920. He partnered Anthony Clare to win the Irish Times debate and the Observer Mace debate, and was elected auditor of the Literary and Historical Society in spite of his unpopular pro-British views.

At Peterhouse, Cambridge, Cosgrave switched from "Paddy" to "Patrick", and earned a doctorate in history from Cambridge University. His supervisor was Herbert Butterfield, whom he later described as "the greatest influence on my life I can define". He was among the Peterhouse alumni nicknamed "the reactionary chic" by the New Statesman.

== Career ==
Having freelanced for Raidió Teilifís Éireann while at UCD, he was appointed their London correspondent in 1968, before working at the Conservative Research Department from 1969, where he was given the task of briefing Ted Heath for Parliamentary Questions, but his temperament did not match Heath's. He became a Zionist. He became political editor of The Spectator in 1971, where his numerous, often scathing, articles about Edward Heath's leadership were influential in effecting the change to Margaret Thatcher, and earned him the nickname "The Mekon".

When Thatcher first saw him speaking on television, she reportedly dismissed him as a "typical upper-class public school twit", to his obvious delight. In 1975, he became her advisor while she was Leader of the Opposition. He seemed on the path to a safe seat in Parliament, and ultimately a cabinet post. However, Thatcher dropped him after winning power in the 1979 general election, by which time his heavy drinking was impairing his reliability. Private Eye suggested Thatcher dropped him because he had vomited on her in a taxi, though the story is disputed.

Subsequently, he was briefly editor-in-chief of Tiny Rowland's Lonrho publications. He had first attracted Rowland's attention in 1973 after criticising in The Spectator Ted Heath's calling Lonrho "the unacceptable face of capitalism". After this, Cosgrave earned a precarious living as a freelance journalist and by writing books, mainly political biographies. Among other publications, he wrote for The Times, The Daily Telegraph, The Independent, The Irish Times, The Irish Press, the Literary Review, Encounter, the New Law Journal, and Le Point.

=== Books ===
Cosgrave's first book was a review of the poetry of Robert Lowell. Martin Seymour-Smith derided the book, but Lowell agreed with Cosgrave's criticism of "Mr Edwards and the Spider", and dedicated a rewritten version to him.

His 1978 biography of Margaret Thatcher was faulted for hero worship; George Gale called it "not much above a hagiography". His biography of Enoch Powell, whom he also admired, was made with access to Powell and his correspondence, and was the work of which he was most proud. He completed only the first volume of a planned two-volume study of Winston Churchill during World War II.

He published three mystery novels featuring the daring Colonel Allen Cheyney.

== Personal life ==
He obtained a British passport and sometimes attended services of the Church of England, while remaining agnostic. In contrast to his public image as a vigorous polemicist, he was considered kind and courteous in private.

He married three times and divorced twice. His first marriage in 1965 was to Ruth Dudley Edwards, a fellow student at UCD and, later, Cambridge. He married Norma Green, mother of his daughter Rebecca, in 1974; and Shirley Ward, his widow, in 1981; she was secretary of the European Democrats at the European Parliament.

He had financial problems from the late 1970s and when Green left him in 1980, Rebecca was made a ward of court. In 1981 the Inland Revenue filed a tax demand for over £10,000 and he was declared bankrupt. His debt of £18,700 was discharged in 1985.

He died of heart failure. His poor health was exacerbated by heavy drinking and smoking.

== Works ==
=== Books ===
- The Public Poetry of Robert Lowell. London: Gollancz. 1970. ISBN 0-575-00539-4.
- Churchill at War. Vol. 1, Alone, 1939-40. London: Collins. 1974. ISBN 0-00-211184-5.
- Cheyney's Law. London: Macmillan. 1977. ISBN 0-333-21635-0. (novel)
- Margaret Thatcher: a Tory and her party. London: Hutchinson. 1978. ISBN 0-09-131380-5.
- The Three Colonels. London: Macmillan. 1979. ISBN 0-333-25941-6. (novel)
- R.A. Butler: an English life. London: Quartet Books. 1981. ISBN 0-7043-2258-7.
- Adventure of State. Bolton: Ross Anderson Publications. 1984. ISBN 0-86360-016-6. (novel)
- Thatcher: The First Term. London: Bodley Head. 1985. ISBN 0-370-30602-3.
- Carrington: a life and a policy. London: Dent. 1985. ISBN 0-460-04691-8.
- The Lives of Enoch Powell. London: Bodley Head. 1989. ISBN 0-370-30871-9.
- The Strange Death of Socialist Britain: post-war British politics. London: Constable. 1992. ISBN 0-09-471430-4.

=== Papers ===
- Impressions of Israel. Anglo-Israel Association. Vol. 53. London: Anglo-Israel Association. 1975.
- Israel Revisited: address to the Anglo-Israel Association. Vol. 78/2. London: Anglo-Israel Association. 23 February 1978.
- The defence of Britain. Salisbury papers. London: Salisbury Group. 1978.
- The origins, evolution and future of Israeli foreign policy. Sacks lectures. Vol. 6. Oxford Centre for Postgraduate Hebrew Studies. 23 May 1979.
- George Richey (1985). NATO's strategy: a case of outdated priorities?. Occasional paper. London: Alliance Publishers for the IEDSS. ISBN 0-907967-40-X.

== See also ==
- Auditors of the Literary and Historical Society (University College Dublin)
