= List of auditors of the Literary and Historical Society (University College Dublin) =

The Auditor of the Literary and Historical Society at University College Dublin, Ireland is a position elected by the members of the society. In this setting, the term auditor has no connection with accounting but means "a position corresponding to that of President of the Union at Oxford or Cambridge" (Oxford English Dictionary). Some former auditors of the society have gone on to careers of high distinction in law, politics, medicine, academia, journalism, and other endeavours.

== Auditors of the Literary and Historical Society ==
This is a list of the auditors from when the society was founded by John Henry Newman in 1855 to the present:

- 1856–1857 Henry S. Bethell
- 1857–1858 Augustus P. Bethell
- 1858–1859 Hugh Hyacinth MacDermot
- 1859–1860 Richard Fennelly
- 1861–1862 Philip Farrelly
- 1862–1863 John Kean
- 1863–1864 John Butler
- 1864–1865 Morgan B. Kavanagh
- 1865–1866 Robert Wogan MacDonnell
- 1866–1867 Patrick J. O'Connor
- 1867–1868 Charles Dawson
- 1868–1869 N. J. Gossan
- 1869–1870 William Dillon
- 1870–1871 George Fottrell
- 1871–1872 Michael Charles Aughney
- 1872–1873 Michael Francis Cox
- 1873–1874 Michael O'Meara
- 1874–1875 John Dillon
- 1875–1876 Gerald Griffin
- 1876–1877 John Francis O'Carroll
- 1877–1878 Michael Duff
- 1878–1879 Ignatius O'Brien
- 1880–1881 J. D. McFeeley
- 1882–1883 Joseph McGrath
- 1883–1884 Thomas A Finlay, S. J.
- 1884–1885 Robert Donovan
- 1885–1886 Edmund Young
- 1886–1887 Joseph J. Farrell
- 1887–1888 Patrick Lennox
- 1888–1889 William Magennis
- 1889–1890 John F. W. Howley
- 1890–1891 Luke Nolan
- 1897–1898 Charles Griffin / Francis Skeffington
- 1898–1899 Thomas M. Kettle
- 1899–1900 Arthur E. Clery
- 1900-1901 Hugh Kennedy
- 1901-1902 Robert Kinahan
- 1902-1903 William Dawson
- 1903-1904 John P. Doyle
- 1904-1905 Richard Sheehy
- 1905-1906 Thomas F. Bacon
- 1906–1907 Francis Cruise O'Brien
- 1907–1908 Maurice Healy
- 1908–1909 Thomas Bodkin
- 1909–1910 Michael McGilligan
- 1910–1911 Michael Davitt
- 1911–1912 John A. Ronayne / Patrick McGilligan
- 1912–1913 Arthur Cox
- 1913–1914 Michael J. Ryan
- 1914–1915 James R. MacDonnell
- 1915–1916 James G. O'Connor
- 1916–1917 Joseph Mooney
- 1917–1918 H. Garrett McGrath
- 1918–1919 Thomas F. Aird
- 1919–1920 Daniel Binchy
- 1920–1921 John Farrell
- 1921–1922 James Skehan
- 1922–1923 David H. Travers
- 1923–1924 John Charles Flood
- 1924–1925 Bernard J. M. MacKenna
- 1925–1926 Anthony J. Malone / Richard K. Boylan
- 1926–1927 Patrick Byrne
- 1927–1928 John J. Nash
- 1928–1929 Thomas A. O'Rourke
- 1929–1930 William Binchy / Thomas A. O'Rourke / Robert Dudley Edwards
- 1930–1931 John Kent
- 1931–1932 Cearbhall Ó Dálaigh
- 1932–1933 James Meenan
- 1933–1934 Vivion de Valera
- 1934–1935 R. N. Cooke
- 1935–1936 Desmond Bell
- 1936–1937 Vincent Grogan
- 1937–1938 Richard Walsh
- 1938–1939 Thomas F. O'Higgins
- 1939–1940 Tomas P. Ó Siaghail
- 1940–1941 Patrick N. Meenan
- 1941–1942 Frank Roe
- 1942–1943 Francis Meenan
- 1943–1944 Richard Cremins / Peter Hogbin
- 1944–1945 Walter Treanor
- 1945–1946 Eamonn Walsh
- 1946–1947 Frank Martin
- 1947–1948 Kevin Burke
- 1948–1949 Patrick J. O'Kelly
- 1949–1950 Patrick J. Connolly
- 1950–1951 Richard Ryan
- 1951–1952 Dermot Ryan
- 1952–1953 Diarmuid Ó Sioradain
- 1953–1954 Gerard Sheehy
- 1954–1955 Micheal Ó Riain
- 1955–1956 Henry Kennedy
- 1956–1957 Desmond P. H. Windle
- 1957–1958 Myles McSwiney
- 1958–1959 Owen Dudley Edwards
- 1959–1960 Brian McSwiney
- 1960–1961 Dermot Bouchier Hayes
- 1961–1962 Desmond J. Green
- 1962–1963 Louis B. Courtney
- 1963–1964 Anthony W. Clare
- 1964–1965 Patrick Cosgrave
- 1965–1966 Henry Crawley
- 1966–1967 Anthony D. Glavin / J Harold Owens
- 1967–1968 Henry Kelly
- 1968–1969 Dermot Gleeson
- 1969–1970 Gerald Barry
- 1970–1971 Mary E. Finlay
- 1971–1972 Declan O'Donovan
- 1972–1973 Adrian Hardiman
- 1973–1974 Kevin Cross
- 1974–1975 J. Gerard Danaher
- 1975–1976 Michael Moloney
- 1976–1977 Paul O'Higgins
- 1977–1978 Frank Callanan
- 1978–1979 Maev-Ann Wren
- 1979–1980 Gerard Stembridge
- 1980–1981 Charles Meenan
- 1981–1982 Laurence Ward
- 1982–1983 Cormac Lucey
- 1983–1984 Shane Murphy
- 1984–1985 Dermot Meagher / Isobel Murray
- 1985–1986 Eamon Delaney
- 1986–1987 Richard Humphreys
- 1987–1988 Denise McDonald
- 1988–1989 Oliver O'Brien
- 1989–1990 Jason A. Devitt
- 1990–1991 Pat O'Keeffe
- 1991–1992 Sinéad E. Canning
- 1992–1993 Marcus Dowling
- 1993–1994 Tabitha Wood
- 1994–1995 Padraig Francis; Dara Ó Briain
- 1995–1996 Ian Walsh
- 1996–1997 Alastair McMenamin
- 1997–1998 Tom Wright
- 1998–1999 Barry Ward
- 1999–2000 Patrick E. Smyth
- 2000–2001 J. Paul Brady
- 2001–2002 Brian Flanagan
- 2002–2003 Jarlath Regan
- 2003–2004 Ciaran Lawlor
- 2004–2005 Frank Kennedy
- 2005–2006 Louisa Ní Eadeáin
- 2006–2007 Ross McGuire; David O'Connor [Vice-Auditor]
- 2007–2008 Michael MacGrath
- 2008–2009 Ian Hastings
- 2009–2010 Conor McAndrew
- 2010–2011 Niall Fahy
- 2011–2012 Christine Simpson
- 2012–2013 Daisy Onubogu
- 2013–2014 Alex Owens
- 2014–2015 Eoin MacLachlan
- 2015–2016 Conor Rock
- 2016–2017 Donal Naylor
- 2017–2018 Aisling Tully
- 2018–2019 Ella McLoughlin
- 2019–2020 Anthony Tracey
- 2020–2021 Samuel Ajetunmobi
- 2021–2022 Rob Fitzpatrick
- 2022–2023 Adrianne Ward
- 2023–2024 Ayman Memon
- 2024–2025 Stéphane de Bairéid
- 2025–2026 Noah Mullen Clarke
- 2026–2027 Katie O'Sullivan
