= Laura Viani =

President of the Royal College of Surgeons in Ireland
- In office 7 June 2022 – 2024
- Preceded by: Ronan O'Connell
- Succeeded by: Deborah McNamara

Personal details
- Children: 1
- Education: Trinity College Dublin; University of Manchester

Laura G. Viani is an Irish otolaryngologist and neurotologist who established Ireland's first national cochlear implant program in 1995 and has performed over 2,000 cochlear implant surgeries. She served as president of the Royal College of Surgeons in Ireland (RCSI) from 2022 to 2024. A specialist in neuro-otology and skull base surgery, she established a multi-institutional Hearing Research Centre to foster collaboration between hospitals and universities.

== Education ==
Viani attended medical school at Trinity College Dublin, where she completed a Bachelor of Arts, Bachelor of Surgery, and Bachelor of the Art of Obstetrics (BA, BCH, BAO). She also completed a Diploma in Micro-vascular and Micro-neural Anastomosis with dissection of free flaps (DMMD). Her career in surgery began in paediatric surgery before she progressed into otolaryngology. After graduating, she pursued postgraduate training in otolaryngology in Dublin, Manchester, and Liverpool. At the University of Manchester, she earned a Master of Science (MSc) in Audiological Medicine. During her training in Liverpool, she was mentored by Philip Stell. Upon completion of her specialist training, she became a Fellow of the Royal College of Surgeons in Ireland (FRCSI).

She won a RAMI Registrar Prize and a Research Fellowship from the RCSI in 1986, the Augustine Mehigan Scholarship in 1992, and the TWJ Scholarship in 1993. Viani later undertook further specialized fellowships in skull base surgery in Cambridge, and in neuro-otology in Zurich. It was during her time in Cambridge that she was exposed to cochlear implant clinics, which inspired her to bring the service to Ireland.

== Career ==
Viani was appointed as a consultant otolaryngologist to Beaumont Hospital, Dublin in 1993 and is Ireland's first female ENT surgeon. She is also a consultant at Children's Health Ireland at Temple Street. Viani is a past president of the otolaryngology section of the Royal Academy of Medicine in Ireland and a past president of the Student Surgical Society in RCSI. She has held honorary positions as an associate professor of surgery at RCSI and an adjunct professor in the School of Medicine at Trinity College Dublin.

=== National Cochlear Implant Program ===
Recognizing a lack of services for profoundly deaf individuals in Ireland, Viani returned from her fellowships to establish the country's first cochlear implant program. She opened her first clinic in 1994 and performed Ireland's first cochlear implant surgery on an adult in March 1995, followed by the first pediatric implant in 1996. For 14 years, until 2009, she was the only surgeon performing the procedure in the country. She has performed over 2,000 cochlear implants on both children and adults.

The program began with three staff members working from a desk at the back of a hospital. Viani faced challenges in securing support and funding. In the program's early days, she had to personally buy hearing aids for children for their pre-implantation trials to avoid long waits. To overcome these obstacles, she engaged in political lobbying and, along with patients and parents, launched the "Happy New Ear" campaign to raise public awareness.

The service grew into the National Hearing Implant and Research Centre (NHIRC), a standalone department at Beaumont Hospital. By 2019, the multidisciplinary team had expanded to over 30 professionals, and the program had a ring-fenced annual budget of €6.8 million. The centerperforms approximately 200 cochlear implant surgeries annually. Viani was honored as the Graves Lecturer in 2012. In 2019, she received multiple awards recognizing her contributions, including the Philip Stell Award and the inaugural Cpl World-Class Talent Award. In 2021, she delivered the Joseph Toynbee Memorial Lecture at the Royal Society of Medicine in London. She was a visiting professor at the Cochlear Institutes of Sydney, Melbourne, and Bahrain.

=== Royal College of Surgeons in Ireland ===
Viani has been an active member of the RCSI Council since 2000. In February 2020, she was elected President-elect of the college. On June 7, 2022, she was officially elected president, succeeding Ronan O'Connell. Her election alongside Deborah McNamara as vice-president was a historic first for the RCSI, marking the first time a woman held both the president and vice-president roles simultaneously. She served a two-year term from 2022 to 2024, becoming only the second female president in the institution's history.

During her presidency, in October 2022, Viani was awarded an honorary fellowship in the American College of Surgeons. On December 5, 2023, she received the 'Outstanding Contribution to Healthcare' award at the Irish Healthcare Awards in Dublin.

== Personal life ==
Viani has a son named Dylan.
