= Charles Meenan =

Irish judge (born 1957)

The Hon. Mr Justice Charles Meenan

Judge of the Court of Appeal
- Incumbent
- Assumed office 4 July 2023
- Nominated by: Government of Ireland
- Appointed by: Michael D. Higgins

Judge of the High Court
- In office 19 June 2017 – 4 July 2023
- Nominated by: Government of Ireland
- Appointed by: Michael D. Higgins

Personal details
- Born: Charles Francis Meenan; 21 June 1957 (age 69) Dublin, Ireland
- Spouse: Anita Meenan (m. 1984)
- Children: 2
- Education: University College Dublin; King's Inns

Charles Francis Meenan (born 21 June 1957) is an Irish judge who has served as a Judge of the Court of Appeal since July 2023. He previously served as a Judge of the High Court from 2017 and 2023.

== Early life ==
Meenan graduated from Gonzaga College in 1975. He was educated at University College Dublin and King's Inns. He was the auditor of the UCD Literary and Historical Society between 1980 and 1981. His inaugural speech featured contributions from former Taoiseach Jack Lynch, then Leader of the Opposition Garret FitzGerald and Professors James Meenan and Brendan Walsh. His father Charles Meenan and uncles James and Patrick were also former auditors. He was the team winner of the Irish Times Debate in 1981 for the L&H with teammate Gerard Stembridge.

== Legal career ==
He was called to the Bar in 1980. He became Senior Counsel in 1998 and is a CEDR Accredited Mediator. He led a wide practice, including representing clients in matters involving professional negligence, personal injuries, constitutional law, commercial and administrative law.

He represented John Bruton at the Moriarty Tribunal in 1999. He represented Des Smyth and his co-investors in actions against businessman Thomas O'Keeffe. He was counsel for James Reilly who appeared in a personal capacity in a defamation action and acted for Michael Neary in several actions.

He provided legal advice to the Oireachtas committee conducting hearings during the Committee of Inquiry into the Banking Crisis.

He was a legal assessor for bodies including the Irish Medical Council and the Irish Nursing Board. He was the Chairman of the Ethics Committee of the Temple Street Children's University Hospital between 2002 and 2015.

== Judicial career ==
=== High Court ===
He was nominated to the High Court in May 2017 and appointed in June 2017.

Meenan has heard cases involving personal injuries against the estate of Dolores O'Riordan and a defamation action taken by Gerry Adams against the BBC. In 2017, he overturned a decision of the Data Protection Commissioner which had found that Alan Shatter had acted in breach of his duties while Minister for Justice and Equality. He found in 2018, that Simon Harris had not taken proper account of reports in his role as Minister for Health in a decision to launch an inquiry into the welfare of patients at the National Maternity Hospital, Dublin.

He was appointed to make a report into issues surrounding the CervicalCheck cancer scandal in August 2018. The purpose of his investigation was to propose alternatives to court cases. He proposed the establishment of a tribunal of inquiry in his findings published in October 2018, which formed the basis of the government's decision to introduce the CervicalCheck Tribunal Act 2019.

As of 2020, Meenan is the Judge in Charge of the Non-Jury and Judicial Review List of the High Court. In May 2020, he presided over a hearing in which Gemma O'Doherty and John Waters sought leave for judicial review to challenge the constitutionality of legislation enacted in response to the COVID-19 pandemic. He refused to grant leave.

=== Court of Appeal ===
He was nominated for appointment to the Court of Appeal in May 2023. He was appointed in July 2023.

== Personal life ==
He and his wife, Anita, have two children who are solicitors.
