= Medical education in Ireland =

Medical education in Ireland is the education of medical students and qualified medical doctors across the island of Ireland.

== Medical schools ==
There are eight medical schools in Ireland from which students can obtain a medical degree, including six schools in the Republic of Ireland and two schools in Northern Ireland. Medical schools in the Republic of Ireland are accredited by the Medical Council of Ireland, while Northern Ireland is regulated by the General Medical Council. All schools except University of Limerick Medical School offer undergraduate courses in medicine.

=== Republic of Ireland ===
Name	City	Established	Comments	Degree awarded	Course entry & length	Ref.
University of Galway, School of Medicine	Galway	1845	Medicine was one of the original founding Faculties of the university.	MB BCh BAO	5 year undergraduate course	
Royal College of Surgeons in Ireland	Dublin	1784	RCSI is the only independent, not-for-profit medical school in Ireland. Medical qualifications are awarded jointly by the National University of Ireland, the Royal College of Physicians of Ireland, and by the Royal College of Surgeons in Ireland, which has independent degree awarding status.	MB BCh BAO LRCP&SI	5 year undergraduate course; 6 years with foundation year for lower academic requirements	
Trinity College Dublin, School of Medicine	Dublin	1711	Medicine was taught at Trinity College Dublin in some form since at least the early 1600s, but it was not until 1711 that the School of Medicine was officially founded.	BA MB BCh BAO	5 year undergraduate course	
University College Cork, School of Medicine	Cork	1849	The first intake to the medical school was 20 students. At the time, the primary medical degree was an MD.	MB BCh BAO	5 year undergraduate course; rse	
University College Dublin, School of Medicine	Dublin	1854	The Medical School was originally part of the Catholic University of Ireland, based in Dublin.	MB BCh BAO	6 year undergraduate course; 4 year graduate course	
University of Limerick, School of Medicine	Limerick	2007	University of Limerick is the only medical school in Ireland based on Problem-Based Learning. It does not offer medical degrees to undergraduates.	BM BS	4 year graduate course	

=== Northern Ireland ===
Name	City	Established	Comment	Degree awarded	Course entry & length	Ref.
Queen's University Belfast School of Medicine, Dentistry and Biomedical Sciences	Belfast	1821	Only United Kingdom medical school to award graduates Bachelor of Obstetrics (BAO) degree.	MB BCh BAO	5 year undergraduate course	
Ulster University School of Medicine	Magee College, Derry	2021		MBBS	4 year graduate course	

== Postgraduate education ==
=== Republic of Ireland ===
In the Republic of Ireland, medical education begins with a medical degree followed by a 12-month internship to achieve a right to practise medicine in Ireland. The National Doctors Training and Planning unit (NDTP) in the Health Service Executive (HSE) is responsible for the intern scheme. Internships are based with one of the medical schools in the Republic of Ireland and are employed by the HSE.

Following the internship, basic specialist training lasts 2-3 years followed by higher specialist training of 4-6 years. Alternatively, streamlined specialist training is a continuous block of training.

The Forum of Irish Postgraduate Medical Training Bodies, established in 2006, supports a number of postgraduate training bodies in the state.

=== Northern Ireland ===
==== Foundation school ====
The Foundation Programme is a two-year generic programme aiming to bridge medical school and Specialist/General Practice Training. It includes a variety of placement specialities and settings. the programme is operated across the UK with a national curriculum and learning portfolio. The Northern Ireland Foundation School offers a programme exclusively within Northern Ireland.

==== Speciality training ====
===== General practice =====
To train as a general practitioner (GP), after completing a Foundation Programme (not limited to Northern Ireland), a doctor must complete three years of speciality training (ST). This comprises a minimum of 12 to 18 months of posts in a variety of hospital specialities - often including paediatrics, psychiatry, geriatrics and obstetrics & gynaecology.

===== Hospital specialty =====
After successfully completing a Foundation Programme (not limited to Northern Ireland), doctors can pursue Core Training (CT) that lasts two to three years which depends on the specialty. After completion of CT training, doctors can enter a ST post via open competition.

Alternatively, those who complete a Foundation Programme can apply for a run-through programme which lasts five to seven years.

===== Certificate of Completion of Training =====
A Certificate in Completion of Training (CCT) is a confirmation that a doctor has completed an approved UK training programme and can be entered on the Specialist Register or GP Register.

To qualify as a GP for example, a speciality trainee must complete the MRCGP, including the Applied Knowledge Test (AKT), Simulated Consultation Assessment (SCA) and Workplace Based Assessment (WBPA). Passing these three components in addition to 36 months in GP Training allows obtainment of a CCT.

===== Continuing medical education =====
Continuing professional development is now mandatory for all doctors, under guidelines from the General Medical Council.

Medical career grades of the National Health Service
Year	Current (Modernising Medical Careers)		Previous	
1	Foundation doctor (FY1 and FY2), 2 years		Pre-registration house officer (PRHO), 1 year	
2	Foundation doctor (FY1 and FY2), 2 years		Senior house officer (SHO), minimum 2 years; often more	
3	Specialty registrar, general practice (GPST), minimum 3 years	Specialty registrar, hospital speciality (SpR), minimum 5 years	Senior house officer (SHO), minimum 2 years; often more	
4	Specialty registrar, general practice (GPST), minimum 3 years	Specialty registrar, hospital speciality (SpR), minimum 5 years	Specialist registrar, 4–6 years	GP registrar, 1 year
5	Specialty registrar, general practice (GPST), minimum 3 years	Specialty registrar, hospital speciality (SpR), minimum 5 years	Specialist registrar, 4–6 years	General practitioner, 4 years total time in training
6–8	General practitioner, minimum 5 years total time in training	Specialty registrar, hospital speciality (SpR), minimum 5 years	Specialist registrar, 4–6 years	General practitioner, 4 years total time in training
9	General practitioner, minimum 5 years total time in training	Consultant, minimum 7 years total time in training	Consultant, minimum 7–9 years total time in training	General practitioner, 4 years total time in training
Optional	Training is competency based, times shown are a minimum. Training may be extended by obtaining an Academic Clinical Fellowship for research or by dual certification in another speciality.		Training may be extended by pursuing medical research (usually 2–3 years), usually with clinical duties as well	
