= Robert Dudley Edwards =

Irish historian (1909–1988)

Robert Walter Dudley Edwards (4 June 1909 – 5 June 1988) was an Irish historian, one of the leaders of the 'scientific revolution' in Irish history, co-founder of the journal Irish Historical Studies and a lifelong campaigner for archives. He founded University College Dublin's Archives department and is the historian most associated with the campaign to create Ireland's National Archives in 1988.

== Biography ==
Robert Walter Dudley Edwards, known to his friends as Robin and his students as 'Dudley' was born in Dublin. His father was Walter Dudley Edwards, an English journalist who came to Ireland with his wife, Bridget Teresa MacInerney from Clare, and became a civil servant. Dudley Edwards's mother was a supporter of women's rights, a member of Cumann na mBan, and Dudley Edwards later recalled that he had a 'Votes for Women' flag on his pram.

Educated first at the Catholic University School, Dudley Edwards moved first to St. Enda's School and then to Synge Street CBS, before finally returning to the Catholic University School. In his final exams he failed French and Irish but gained first place in Ireland in History.

In 1933, Dudley Edwards married Sheila O'Sullivan (d. 1985), a folklorist and teacher. They had three children: Mary Dudley Edwards, a teacher and civil rights activist; Ruth Dudley Edwards, a historian, crime novelist, journalist and broadcaster; and Owen Dudley Edwards, a historian at the University of Edinburgh. Robert Dudley Edwards died in 1988 in St. Vincent's Hospital after a short illness.

== Academic career ==
In University College Dublin, Edwards was auditor of the Literary and Historical Society, gained a first-class degree in history in 1929 followed by a first class master's degree in 1931 with the National University of Ireland prize. He carried out postgraduate work at the University of London and earned his PhD in 1933 at the Institute for Historical Research, published in 1935 as Church and State in Tudor Ireland. His supervisor at the Institute was Canon Claude Jenkins, who later became Regius Professor of Ecclesiastical History at Oxford University. In collaboration with Theo Moody he founded the Irish Historical Society in 1936, and its journal Irish Historical Studies was first published in 1938. With colleagues, he was responsible for Ireland joining the Comité International des Sciences Historiques in August 1938, at its last meeting before World War II.

In 1937 he was awarded a DLitt by the National University of Ireland and in 1939 was appointed to a statutory lectureship in Modern Irish History at University College Dublin. He succeeded Mary Hayden to the Chair of Modern Irish History in 1944, which he held until he retired in 1979. His contribution to the discipline of History in Ireland was substantial, and included the setting up of University College Dublin Archives Department, now part of the School of History and Archives.

The introduction to David Edwards's book Age of Atrocity records how the leading Irish history journal, Irish Historical Studies (edited by Dudley Edwards and T. W. Moody), for the first half-century and more of its existence, systematically avoided the theme of violence, killing and atrocity during the 16th and 17th centuries.

During his tenure as Chair of Modern History, Dudley Edwards is alleged to have sexually harassed assistant lecturer Miriam Daly until her father visited the department and threatened him with a gun.

== Published works ==
- Church and State in Tudor Ireland. A history of penal laws against Irish Catholics, 1534–1603 (London: Longmans and Company, 1935)
- The great famine: studies in Irish History 1845–52 (Editor, with Desmond Williams; Dublin: Browne and Nolan, 1956)
- A New History of Ireland, (Dublin: Gill and Macmillan, 1972)
- Irish Families: the archival aspect, (Dublin: National University of Ireland, 1974)
- Daniel O'Connell and his world, (London: Thames and Hudson, 1975)
- Ireland in the age of the Tudors : the destruction of Hiberno-Norman civilization, (London: Croom Helm; New York: Barnes and Noble, 1977)
- Sources for Early Modern Irish History, 1534–1641, (with Mary O'Dowd; Cambridge: Cambridge University Press: 1985)

== See also ==
- Auditors of the Literary and Historical Society (University College Dublin)
- Irish History Students' Association
