= Deborah McNamara =

Irish consultant general and colorectal surgeon

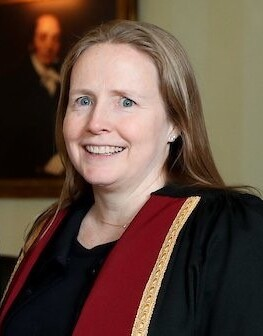
- McNamara in 2018

President of Royal College of Surgeons in Ireland
- Incumbent
- Assumed office 7 June 2024
- Preceded by: Laura Viani

Personal details
- Education: Trinity College Dublin

Deborah A. McNamara is an Irish surgeon and academic serving as president of the Royal College of Surgeons in Ireland (RCSI) since 2024. She also serves as a clinical professor in surgery at the college. A consultant general and colorectal surgeon at Beaumont Hospital, Dublin and Bon Secours Hospital, she is noted for being the first woman to be appointed a consultant colorectal surgeon in Ireland. Her career has focused on the surgical management of colorectal cancer, as well as on national healthcare quality improvement, surgical training and gender equity in the surgical profession.

== Education ==
McNamara earned her primary medical degree, a Bachelor of Medicine, Bachelor of Surgery, and Bachelor in the Art of Obstetrics (MB BAO BCh (Honours)), from Trinity College Dublin. She subsequently completed surgical training in Ireland and France, specializing in the surgical management of colorectal cancer. McNamara completed two fellowships from the Royal College of Surgeons in Ireland (FRCSI and FRCSI (Gen Surg)). McNamara obtained a Doctor of Medicine (MD) degree and a Postgraduate Certificate in Improvement Science (PG Cert Imp Sci) with distinction from Trinity College Dublin, in addition to a Diploma in Quality and Leadership from the Royal College of Physicians of Ireland. She holds a specialist registration in surgery with the Irish Medical Council.

== Career ==
In 2003, McNamara was appointed a consultant general and colorectal surgeon at Beaumont Hospital, Dublin, becoming the first woman in Ireland to hold such a position. She serves as a consultant at Bon Secours Hospital, Dublin. Her clinical practice includes the surgical management of colon and rectal cancer, laparoscopic surgery, endoscopy, and hernia repair.

Alongside her clinical practice, she has held several national leadership roles and serves as a clinical professor in Surgery at RCSI. From 2010 to 2013, she was Programme Director of the National Higher Surgical Training Programme. She chaired the Colorectal Cancer Guidelines and Clinical Leads groups of the Irish National Cancer Control Programme from 2011 to 2024. At Beaumont Hospital, she served as clinical director for surgery from 2014 to 2017, founded the 'Better Beaumont' quality improvement learning collaborative in 2014, and contributed to research collaborations between Beaumont clinicians and RCSI-affiliated scientists.

McNamara has worked on advancing gender equity. In 2017, she chaired the RCSI working group on gender diversity that published the PROGRESS report, which outlined a strategy to improve gender equality within the surgical profession in Ireland. The report was described as groundbreaking and inspired changes in the country's surgical environment. That same year, she began her tenure as co-lead of the National Clinical Programme for Surgery, a role she held until 2024. In October 2023, she was awarded an honorary fellowship in the American College of Surgeons.

McNamara's work has also been recognized with several other significant distinctions, including the Patey Prize, the AWS Olga Jonasson Award, the Millin Lecture of RCSI, and an honorary fellowship from the Royal College of Physicians and Surgeons of Glasgow. Her research interests focus on patient safety, patient outcomes, surgical training and education, and healthcare management and leadership. At RCSI, she is part of research clusters in population health, surgical science and practice, and cancer. Her work is also noted to align with United Nations Sustainable Development Goals, including good health and well-being, and gender equality.

=== Royal College of Surgeons in Ireland Leadership ===
In June 2022, McNamara was elected vice-president of RCSI. The election alongside Laura Viani as president was historic for the institution, as it was the first time two women were elected to serve together as president and vice-president.

On 7 June 2024, McNamara was elected president of RCSI, with professor Michael Kerin being elected as the college's vice-president. Upon her appointment, she stated that a key focus of her presidency would be to "support the younger generation of surgeons who are dealing with considerable challenges". In an interview in October 2024, she identified outdated infrastructure and cumbersome IT systems as significant challenges adding to pressure on staff, and she advocated for separating emergency and scheduled surgical care to better address waiting lists.
