= Maev-Ann Wren =

Irish writer

- Education: Trinity College Dublin; University College Dublin
- Writing career
- Genre: Non-fiction

Maev-Ann Wren is an Irish economist, journalist, author, and former special advisor to the Minister of State at the Department of Health, Roisin Shortall. She is the former economics editor of The Irish Times newspaper. Wren has written two books about the Irish health system and her writings have often been mentioned during Dáil and Seanad debates, and in parliamentary committee. She has been described in the Seanad as "a recognised expert on health care."

== Early life ==
Wren grew up in Rathmines and attended University College Dublin. She graduated in 1978 with a bachelor's degree in history and economics; this was followed by a master's degree in economics from UCD and a PhD in economics from TCD. In 1978, she became the second female auditor in the history of the university's Literary and Historical Society.

== Career ==
Wren worked at The Irish Times from 1980 to 2004 where she covered economic, political and social matters and produced an award-winning series of articles. She has reported from Dublin, Belfast and the United States, and worked as a financial reporter, business features editor, economics editor, columnist, editorial writer and senior newspaper editor. She has studied and travelled in the United States on a World Press Institute fellowship, and was a Fordham University Ethics Center Fellow for 2005.

She won the 2001 National Media Award for newspaper analysis and comment for her October 2000 series, An Unhealthy State, on the Irish health system. The following year, she reached the short list for the 2002 National Media Award for Specialist Writer of the Year for her work on a series, States of Health, comparing Irish health care with other countries'.

Her first book Unhealthy State — Anatomy of a Sick Society (2003) examined the crisis in Irish medical care, and described options for reform. Her second book, How Ireland Cares — The Case for Health Reform (2006) began life as a study of the Irish health system commissioned by the Irish Congress of Trade Unions in preparation for negotiations with the government. It was written with American health economist Professor A. Dale Tussing.

After leaving The Irish Times in 2004, Wren conducted independent research and graduated with a PhD in health economics from Trinity College Dublin, while continuing to contribute journalism and reports to The Sunday Business Post, Village magazine and the Economic and Social Research Institute's Quarterly Economic Commentary. She was formerly employed as a special advisor to the Labour Party Junior Minister Roisin Shortall (2011–2012). She has worked as a researcher at the Centre for Health Policy and Management at TCD (2011–2012) and at the Economic and Social Research Institute in Dublin (2013), where she was a senior research officer from 2014 to her retirement in 2022. She became an adjunct associate professor at the Geary Institute, University College Dublin in 2022.

Wren is a Dubliner and is married to Cormac O'Rourke; they have two daughters, Claire and Sorcha.

== Selected works ==
- Unhealthy State: Anatomy of a Sick Society. Dublin: New Island, 2003. ISBN 1-902602-88-9.
- How Ireland Cares: The Case for Health Care Reform. With A. Dale Tussing. Dublin: New Island, 2006. ISBN 1-905494-23-8.
- Health Spending and the Black Hole. Article in ESRI's Quarterly Economic Commentary, September 2004

== See also ==
- Auditors of the Literary and Historical Society (University College Dublin)
