= Eamon Delaney =

Irish writer and diplomat (born 1962)

Eamon Delaney (born 14 July 1962) is an Irish newspaper columnist, author, editor, novelist, journalist and former diplomat. According to the Irish Independent, Delaney's best-selling memoir of life as an Irish diplomat "ruffled feathers" within the Irish diplomatic corps.

== Education and career ==
Delaney attended University College Dublin (UCD). He was Auditor of the Literary and Historical Society from 1985 to 1986. He served Ireland as a diplomat from 1987 until 1995.

After leaving the diplomatic corps, he became a full-time author. His first novel, The Casting of Mr. O'Shaughnessy was published in 1995, and republished in 2002. The eponymous character of Mr O'Shaughnessy was, in the author's own words, "partly, but quite obviously, based on the career of the colourful Seán MacBride".

His next book, an account of his eight years as a diplomat, An Accidental Diplomat: My Years in the Irish Foreign Service 1987–1995 was widely discussed. Irish journalist Thomas O'Dwyer describes Delaney's wit as "wicked" and his 2001 book An Accidental Diplomat as having been, "a runaway bestseller." Delaney writes for the Irish Independent, and on an occasional basis for The Irish Times and other outlets.

In 2004 Delaney was named editor of the Dublin news and opinion magazine, Magill Magazine, a position that continued until its closure in 2009.

In 2006, he confronted then-MP George Galloway on the Irish talk show The Late Late Show as an audience member.

In 2009 Delaney published a book focusing on the life of his late father, the sculptor Edward Delaney entitled Breaking the Mould.

== O'Shaughnessy hoax ==
In 1986, Delaney applied for a government pension to be granted to Cornelius O'Shaughnessy, fictional hero of Delaney's later novel The Casting of Mr. O'Shaughnessy, on the basis of the character's participation in the 1921 Irish War of Independence. Singer Gavin Friday lent Delaney the name and service details of his own grandfather, an actual veteran of 1921, to serve as the fictional O'Shaughnessy's commanding officer in the application. Delaney cited sufficient plausible historic detail in the application which attracted the personal attention of Taoiseach Charles Haughey. Haughey asked Secretary of Defense Michael J. Noonan to review the case, and three months later the government sent Delaney the appropriate service medals and approved the pension. Delaney revealed the hoax before the pension was actually paid.

== Accidental Diplomat ==
According to The Times of London, Delaney's Accidental Diplomat, "lifted the lid on the internal workings of the Department of Foreign Affairs." The book was serialised in The Sunday Times which described Delaney as "spilling the diplomatic beans."

According to the Irish Times, Delaney's memoir was a "surprise bestseller."

== Columnist ==
In 2011, a Delaney column in the Sunday Independent in which he argued that the gay rights movement is "overreaching" in seeking the "right to marry, to adopt children, and to intimidate opponents into silence," touched off a media flap. Those who criticised Delaney's column included actor Charlie Condou writing in The Guardian.

== Personal life ==
Delaney is married, with children.

== Books ==
- Delaney, Eamon (1995). The Casting of Mr. O'Shaughnessy. Bloomsbury. ISBN 978-0-7475-2002-3.
- Delaney, Eamon (2001). The Accidental Diplomat: My Years in the Irish Foreign Service, 1987-1995. New Island. ISBN 978-1-902602-39-4.
- Delaney, Eamon (2009). Breaking the Mould: A Story of Art and Ireland. New Island. ISBN 978-1-84840-056-6.

== See also ==
- Auditors of the Literary and Historical Society (University College Dublin)
