= Anthony Glavin =

Irish poet and professor of music (1945–2006)

Anthony Glavin (7 August 1945 – 14 November 2006) was an Irish poet and professor of music at the Royal Irish Academy of Music.

== Biography ==
Anthony Glavin was born in Dublin to Kathleen and James J. Glavin. His father fought in the War of Independence and later went on to work for the Irish Sugar Company until he retired in 1971. Glavin was educated at the O'Connell School in Dublin where he excelled at drama and music, eventually studying at the Royal Irish Academy of Music where Dina Copeman was his tutor.

After leaving school, Glavin studied at University College Dublin (UCD) and Trinity College, Dublin. In 1963, during his first year at UCD, he was approached by the Rathmines and Rathgar Musical Society and played Jack Point in The Gaiety's production of The Yeomen of the Guard. He took over from Harry Crawley as auditor of the Literary and Historical Society. During this period he was also active in the UCD drama society, Dramsoc.

Glavin received his licentiate from the Royal Irish Academy of Music (RIAM) and joined the staff there in 1969. During the 1980s he served on the RIAM Board of Governors. Many of his students went on to become distinguished singers, teachers and musicians such as Peter Tuite, who won the European Musician of the Year Award; also Sarah, John and Michelle Picardo, Niamh McGarry and Robin Tritschler. He died at the Mater Hospital, Dublin, after many years of suffering with emphysema. On the day of his funeral the RIAM held a half-day of mourning and a one-minute silence.

== Poetry ==
Glavin began publishing poetry and reviews while at university. His poetry appeared in numerous newspapers and journals and was first anthologised in Irish Poets 1924–74, edited by David Marcus. Anthony received the Patrick Kavanagh Poetry Award in 1987 and his poetry collection, The Wrong Side of the Alps, was published by The Gallery Press in 1989. The following year he received an Arts Council bursary and his collection was shortlisted for the Irish Book Awards. Reviewing The Wrong Side of the Alps for Books Ireland, Fred Johnston wrote that "it is a fine, meticulous book" and "there is, to quote Glavin himself, 'a weightless perfection' about most of these poems."

Glavin's work of half a lifetime was the ambitious sequence of four-line poems, originally titled Living In Hiroshima. Anthony was haunted by the fact that his birthdate, 7 August 1945 (a Bank Holiday in Ireland), was just one day after Little Boy was dropped on Hiroshima; that his coming into the world coincided with an event that abruptly altered the world's "historical velocity." As the title of the first poem in the sequence (taken from a Time article in 1985) puts it: "Everybody lives in Hiroshima." When Anthony received his Arts Council bursary in 1990, his intention was to travel to Japan, to visit Hiroshima and Nagasaki and supplement his extensive research with actual experience.

== Writings ==
- The Wrong Side of the Alps (Dublin: The Gallery Press, 1989)
