= Bríd Ryan =

Irish biomedical scientist

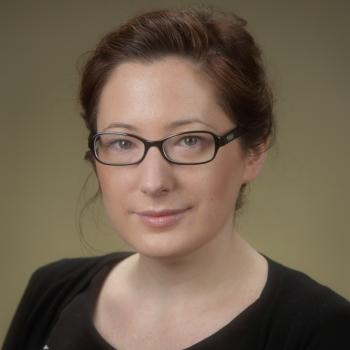
- Ryan in 2013
- Born: Ireland
- Education: University College Cork; University College Dublin
- Scientific career
- Fields: Cancer research, health disparities
- Workplaces: National Cancer Institute

Bríd M. Ryan is an Irish biomedical scientist and cancer researcher. She was an investigator at the National Cancer Institute from 2013 to 2021.

== Early life and education ==
Ryan grew up on a farm and dairy in Ireland. She has five sisters. Ryan always enjoyed science and decided she wanted to be a cancer researcher as a teenager. She completed her undergraduate training in biochemistry at University College Cork in 2001.

Ryan received her Ph.D. in Cancer Biology from St. Vincent’s University Hospital and UCD School of Medicine and in 2005 was accepted into the National Cancer Institute (NCI) Cancer Prevention Fellowship Program. In 2007, she completed a Masters of Public Health at School of Public Health and Population Sciences, University College Dublin. Ryan worked under the mentorship of Curtis C. Harris during her postdoctoral training at the NCI.

As a postdoc at NCI, she was involved in research that bridged both basic science and translational molecular epidemiology. Initially, Ryan studied populations of European descent, but it became clear that, within the United States, significant disparities in incidence and survival existed across populations.

== Career ==
In 2013, Ryan became a National Institutes of Health (NIH) Stadtman Investigator in the Laboratory of Human Carcinogenesis at the NCI Center for Cancer Research (CCR). Her work focused on health disparities related to lung cancer across different populations.

Ryan left NIH in April 2021 and joined MiNA Therapeutics, where she is VP, Oncology and Immunology Research.

Ryan was among the first to demonstrate asymmetric division of DNA in cancer. This process is thought to underpin how tumors self-renew and regenerate. Since then, her studies have examined the roles of the tumor microenvironment and p53 in regulating this process in lung cancer. Her lab oversees an integrative and translational approach to lung cancer research, examining the genetic, environmental, and biological contributions to racial disparities in lung cancer incidence. Her research program also developed biomarkers for the early detection of lung cancer.

== Works ==
- Ryan, Bríd M.; Robles, Ana I.; Harris, Curtis C. (2010). "Genetic variation in microRNA networks: the implications for cancer research". Nature Reviews Cancer. 10 (6). Springer Science and Business Media LLC: 389–402. doi:10.1038/nrc2867. ISSN 1474-175X. PMC 2950312.
- Ryan, Bríd M.; O’Donovan, Norma; Duffy, Michael J. (2009). "Survivin: A new target for anti-cancer therapy". Cancer Treatment Reviews. 35 (7): 553–562. doi:10.1016/j.ctrv.2009.05.003.
- Greathouse, K. Leigh; White, James R.; Vargas, Ashely J.; Bliskovsky, Valery V.; Beck, Jessica A.; von Muhlinen, Natalia; Polley, Eric C.; Bowman, Elise D.; Khan, Mohammed A.; Robles, Ana I.; Cooks, Tomer; Ryan, Bríd M.; Padgett, Noah; Dzutsev, Amiran H.; Trinchieri, Giorgio; Pineda, Marbin A.; Bilke, Sven; Meltzer, Paul S.; Hokenstad, Alexis N.; Stickrod, Tricia M.; Walther-Antonio, Marina R.; Earl, Joshua P.; Mell, Joshua C.; Krol, Jaroslaw E.; Balashov, Sergey V.; Bhat, Archana S.; Ehrlich, Garth D.; Valm, Alex; Deming, Clayton; Conlan, Sean; Oh, Julia; Segre, Julie A.; Harris, Curtis C. (2018). "Interaction between the microbiome and TP53 in human lung cancer". Genome Biology. 19 (1). doi:10.1186/s13059-018-1501-6. ISSN 1474-760X. PMC 6109311. PMID 30143034.
