= Jarlath Regan =

Irish comedian and podcaster (born 1980)

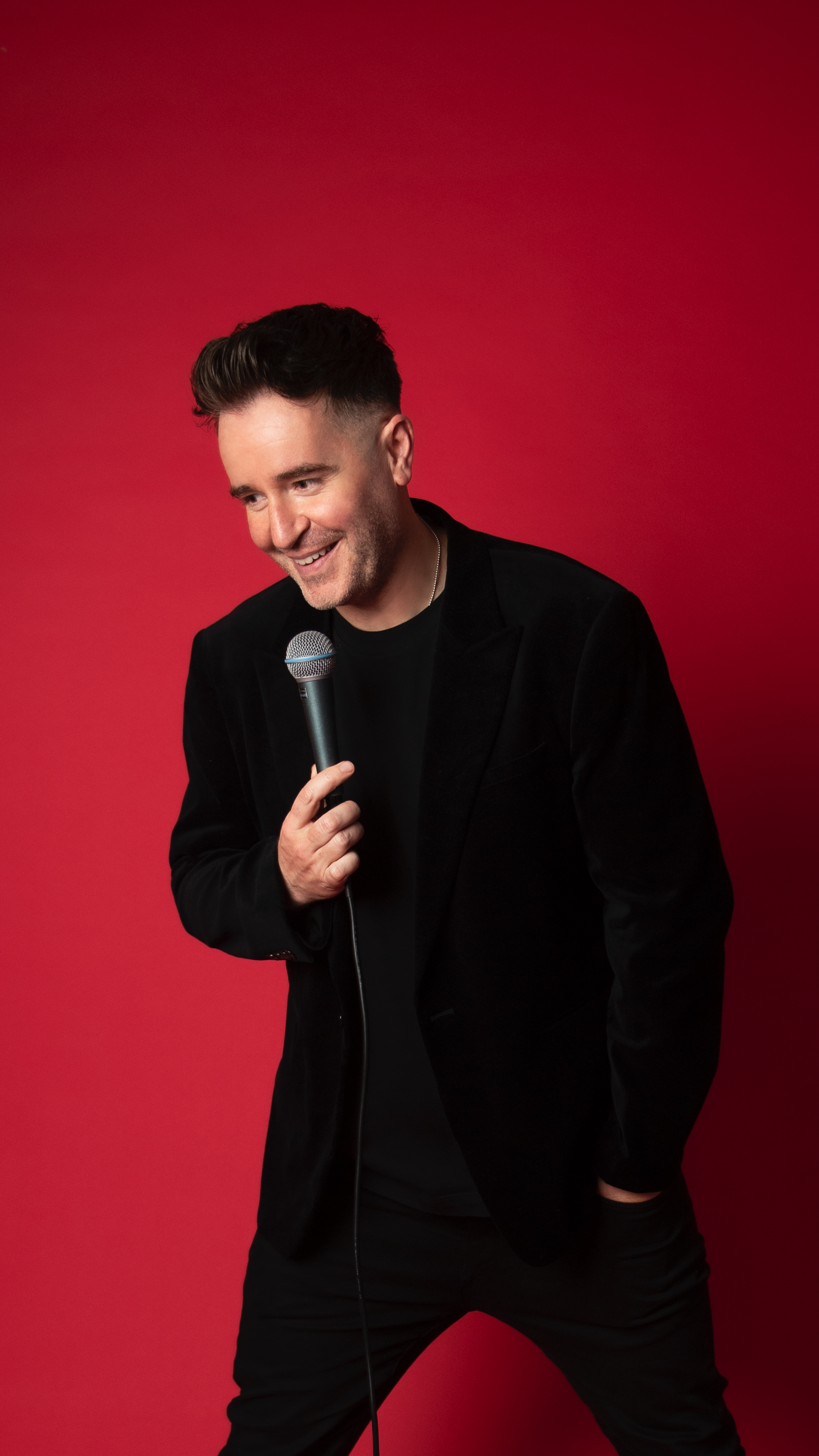
- Regan in 2023
- Born: 1980 (age 45–46)
- Education: University College Dublin
- Occupations: Comedian; podcaster
- Spouse: Tina

Jarlath Regan (born 1980) is an Irish stand-up comedian, television performer, and host of the An Irishman Abroad podcast.

== Stand-up shows ==
While attending University College Dublin, he was auditor of the Literary and Historical Society. Regan began his stand-up comedy career in 2003 and by the end of 2004 was a finalist for three major UK comedy newcomer awards: So You Think You're Funny, BBC New Comedy Awards and the Chortle Student Comedian of the Year. In 2006, he performed as part of the first ever Irish gala at the Just for Laughs festival in Montreal, Canada. Regan's shows have included 2007's Edinburgh Fringe show "Nobody Knows... Jarlath Regan", 2018/19's "Organ Freeman", which chronicled his experience as a live-organ donor, and 2019/2020's "Notion's Eleven", which was recorded in Vicar Street for online release in late 2020.

== Television work ==
Regan wrote and performed sketches on Scope, an Irish science television programme for teenagers and was a regular panellist during the 2008–2009 season of The Panel.

In 2010, Regan co-presented The Rumour Room, a teen entertainment series part of TRTÉ on RTÉ Two television.

== An Irishman Abroad ==
In 2013, Regan began An Irishman Abroad, a series of weekly podcasts interviewing Irish people and people of Irish descent about their lives and gaining insights into the experiences of Irish people abroad, both successes and failures. It won the iTunes Store's award for "Best New Audio Podcast" for 2013.

Most of the guests of the more than 350 episodes have been celebrities from the worlds of comedy (Dara Ó Briain, Jason Byrne, Graham Linehan), sport (Sonia O'Sullivan, Richard Hughes), as well as film and television (Jack Reynor, Aidan Gillen, Paul Mescal).

Some of the guests are not particularly famous, but are successful and have a story to tell. In 2014, The Daily Telegraph included the podcast among the "best comedy podcasts", and Niall Byrne of the Irish Independent included it in a list of "world's greatest podcasts". In 2017, Diaspora website IrishCentral.com described the podcast as "some of the best conversations with Irish people you'll ever hear". Pat Carty of Hot Press attributes this success to the non-reliance on a "parade of famous faces". In 2020, Stevie Gallacher of The Sunday Post described the podcast as proof that the Irish have the "gift of the gab".

In 2014, Paul Campbell of The Guardian's "Talking Sport" blog wrote of the Jerry Flannery edition that "every single young person reading this should go download this podcast and listen to it every week for the rest of time".

A justice-themed spin-off series Irishman Behind Bars was launched in 2019, while a basketball-themed spin-off series, Inside Basketball and US politics-themed series, Irishman In America, were launched in 2020. Irishman Running Abroad also launched in 2020.

The podcast moved to Patreon in August 2020. Regan took over the editing and production on all of the Irishman Abroad podcasts. Together with his wife Tina, he created a new parenting podcast entitled, "Honey! You Are Ruining Our Kid!" This podcast was piloted on Patreon and released to the general public through a partnership with the GoLoud Network in September 2022.

== See also ==
- Auditors of the Literary and Historical Society (University College Dublin)
