= Irish History Students' Association =

Academic organisation which promotes the study of history in Ireland

Irish History Students' Association Comhaltas na gCumann Staire
- IHSA CCS logo
- Abbreviation: IHSA CCS
- Formation: 1950
- Type: student association academic conference
- Headquarters: Ireland

IHSA (Irish: Comaltas na gCumann Staire) is an academic organisation which promotes the study of history in Ireland. The organisation was founded in 1950 by representatives from the main universities of Ireland in Dublin. The association organises an annual conference in Ireland on a rotating basis between the main third level institutions offering history courses and research facilities. Its current Reachtaire (Chair) is Dr Sarah-Anne Buckley.

== History ==
The Inaugural Congress of the Irish Inter-Varsity History Students took place at Newman House, St Stephen's Green, Dublin, on 17 February 1950. Niall Delargy (University College Galway, now NUI Galway), F.X. Martin (University College Dublin), Con O'Leary (University College Cork), Cecil Smith (Queen's University Belfast), and Laird Taylor (Trinity College Dublin) were instrumental in organising the first annual congress. Robert Dudley Edwards (1909–88), Professor of Modern Irish History at UCD, was a key figure in what became known as the Irish Universities History Students' Association, now called the Comhaltas na gCumann Staıre (CCS) - Irish History Students' Association (IHSA), serving as senior archivist and adviser to successive committees down to 1980 when he retired from the post.

== Conference ==
The association organises an annual conference on a rotating basis between the main third level institutions of Ireland. This conference sees papers presented by those studying and researching history at both undergraduate and postgraduate levels. In more recent years the vast majority of papers presented are by students undertaking a PhD. The conference generally features an opening reception on a Friday evening with the papers presented the following day. Due to the large number of papers presented it is normal to have multiple panels of papers taking place at the same time. The Comhdháil 2016 Conference took place on the weekend of the 19–21 February 2016 on the campus of NUIG in Gaillimh - Galway, the main city of the province of Connacht on the west coast of the island. Trinity College Dublin followed-up by hosting of the annual conference for 2017 while the following year's conference took place on the Derry campus of the University of Ulster. On the weekend of 1–2 March the Comhdháil 2019 Conference was organised on the campus of MIC (Coláiste Mhuire Gan Smál) in the city of Limerick. Following several years of not hosting a conference University College Dublin hosted the 2020 conference over the weekend of the 28–29 February, before the full impact of the Covid19 pandemic was felt in Ireland. Due to the aforementioned pandemic the 2021 conference is planned to happen entirely online, making it the Association's first ever virtual conference. The 2021 host institution is Maynooth University (Ollscoil Mhá Nuad), also known as the National University of Ireland Maynooth.
