= Ronan Sheehan =

Irish writer

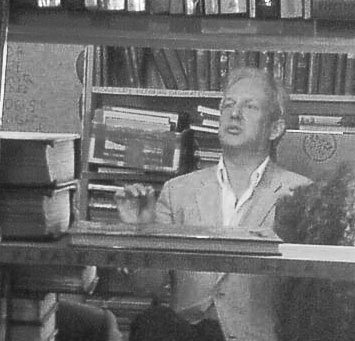
Ronan Sheehan at the West Port Book Festival

Ronan Sheehan (born 1953) is an Irish novelist, short story writer and essayist. He was an early member of the Irish Writers' Co-operative (founded in 1974 by Fred Johnston, Neil Jordan and Peter Sheridan) and its Secretary from 1975 to 1983. He received the Rooney Prize for Irish Literature in 1984. Until 2005 he was a practising lawyer in Dublin, specialising in copyright law. He was the General Editor of the Catullus Project to translate works by Catullus into English and Irish.

Sheehan was educated at Gonzaga College, and University College Dublin, and the Incorporated Law Society. Neil Jordan, the Irish filmmaker, called his Foley's Asia, "A meditation on arms, oppression and empire, [offering] a unique insight into [the] Irish and Indian colonial experience".

== Works ==
- Tennis Players (Dublin, Co-Op Books, 1977), ISBN 0-905441-03-6.
- Boy with an injured eye (Tralee, Brandon Books, 1983), ISBN 0-86322-028-2 (Hardcover), ISBN 0-86322-049-5 (Paperback)
- Foley's Asia (Dublin, The Lilliput Press, 1999), ISBN 1-901866-36-X.
- The Irish Catullus: One Gentleman from Verona (A.& A. Farmar, 15 April 2010), ISBN 978-1-906353-19-3.
