= Patrick Meenan =

Patrick Meenan (30 June 1917 – 30 June 2008) was the president of the Medical Council of Ireland and dean of the faculty of medicine in University College Dublin (UCD). In his research work, he was involved with Albert Sabin and Jonas Salk in the development of the polio vaccine. He was educated in the Catholic University School, Clongowes Wood, and UCD, where he became auditor of the Literary and Historical Society. He died in June 2008.

== Publications ==
- The essentials of virus diseases 1951

== See also ==
- Auditors of the Literary and Historical Society (University College Dublin)
