= Rajorshi Chakraborti =

Indian writer and academic

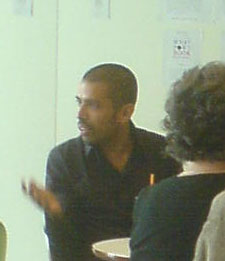
Rajorshi Chakraborti at the West Port Book Festival

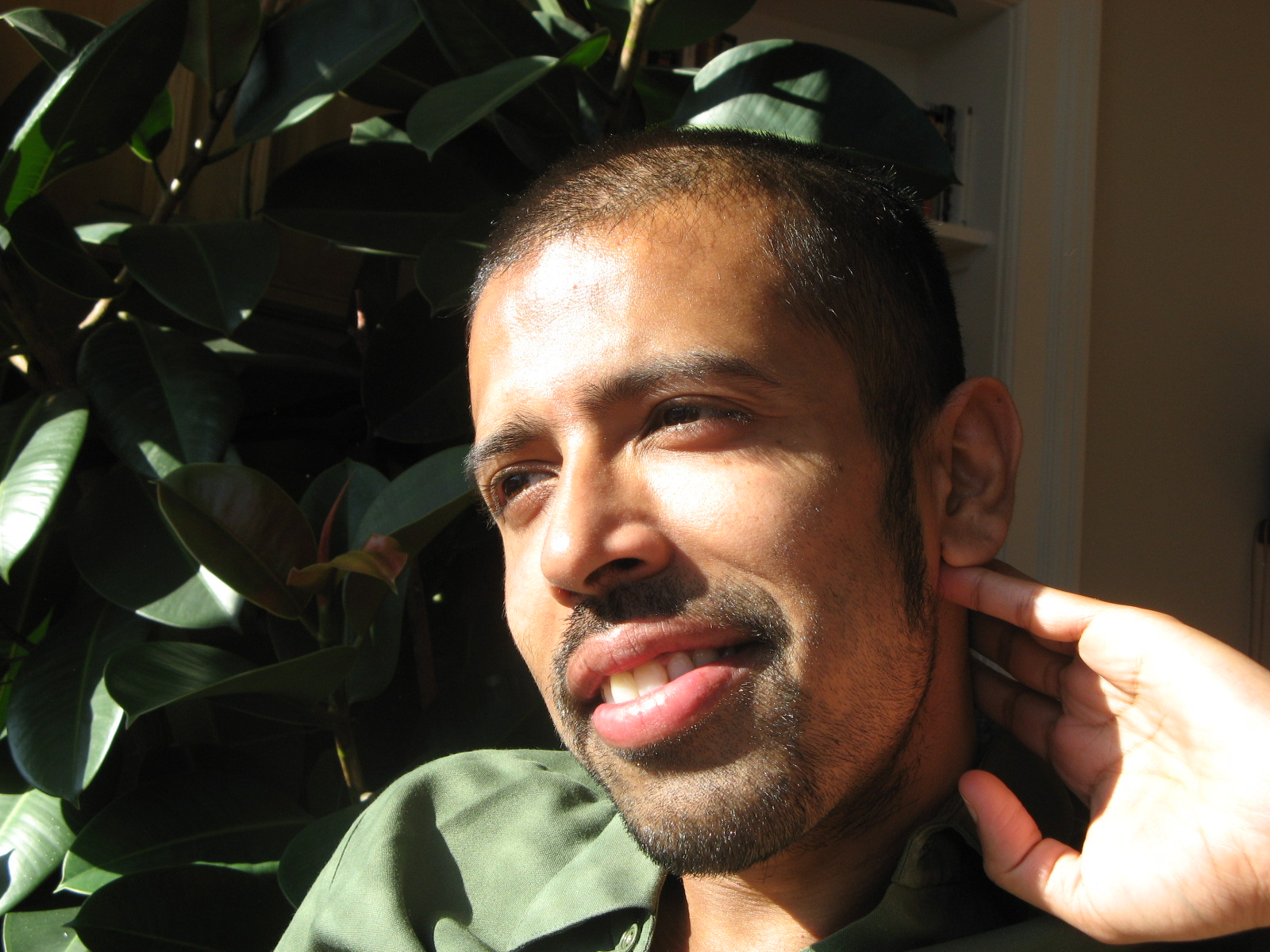
Rajorshi Chakraborti

Rajorshi Chakraborti is an Indian novelist and academic. He was born in 1977 in Kolkata, and grew up there and in Mumbai. He attended the Lester B. Pearson United World College in Victoria, B.C., Canada, the University of Hull where he was awarded the Philip Larkin Prize, and the University of Edinburgh where he completed his doctoral studies in African and Indian Literature. Chakraborti is the great-grandson of the Bengali writer Hemendrakumar Roy.

Chakraborti's first novel Or the Day Seizes You, (Penguin India), was shortlisted for the Hutch-Crossword Book Award in 2006. A Spanish translation entitled La Vida Que Nos Lleva was published in April 2009 by Ediciones Ambar. His second novel, Derangements was published by HarperCollins in August 2008.

The novel Derangements appeared in the US in July 2010 under the title Shadow Play, published by St Martin's Press (Minotaur Books). Chakraborti's third novel, Balloonists, was released in June 2010 in India, published by Westland Books.

He has also published reviews, short stories and essays in periodicals and anthologies including the Edinburgh Review; Turbine; The Istanbul Review (forthcoming); Excess: The Tehelka Book of Stories (Hachette India: 2010); Why We Don't Talk (Rupa: 2010); Too Asian, Not Asian Enough (An Anthology of New British Asian Fiction) (Tindal Street Press: 2011), The Edinburgh Introduction to Studying English Literature (EUP: 2010), and The Popcorn Essayists: What Movies do to Writers (Westland: 2011).

Between 2007 and 2010, Chakraborti worked as a lecturer in English Literature and Creative Writing at the University of Edinburgh. He currently lives in Wellington, New Zealand.

Chakraborti's novel, Mumbai Rollercoaster, appeared in India in November 2011, published by Hachette India. His most recent novel "The Man Who Would Not See" is published by Penguin Random House New Zealand in February 2018, it has been longlisted for the NZ Ockham Book Awards 2019
