= Peter Tuite =

Irish pianist (born 1976)

Peter Tuite is a classical concert pianist.

== Early studies ==
Born in Dublin, Tuite was first educated at Belvedere College SJ. He studied under Anthony Glavin at the Royal Irish Academy of Music and later at the Peabody Institute in the United States. Tuite earned degrees at Trinity College Dublin, and the Royal Irish Academy of Music before, in 2002, he was awarded a Fulbright Scholarship and a Bank or Ireland Millennium Scholarship for further study in the United States, whereupon he enrolled at the Peabody Institute of Johns Hopkins University. After completing his graduate studies at Peabody, he earned a Masters in Literature and Arts from the University of Oxford. Whilst a student, Tuite won several awards for classical performance, including the Millennium Young Musician of the Future competition, and the Chopin Prize at the Dublin International Piano Competition.

== Career ==
A number of Tuite's performances have been broadcast on both radio and television. In 2008, he was appointed head of the keyboard faculty at the Royal Irish Academy of Music, whilst between 2015 and 2018, he served as "Head of Piano and Keyboard Instruments" at Trinity Laban Conservatoire of Music and Dance in London. As of May 2020 he was a member of faculty at both the Royal Irish Academy of Music and Trinity Laban Conservatoire of Music and Dance. In April 2024, Tuite was appointed as Head of Keyboard at the Royal Irish Academy of Music for a further four years.
