= West Port Book Festival =

Book festival in Edinburgh (2008-2012)

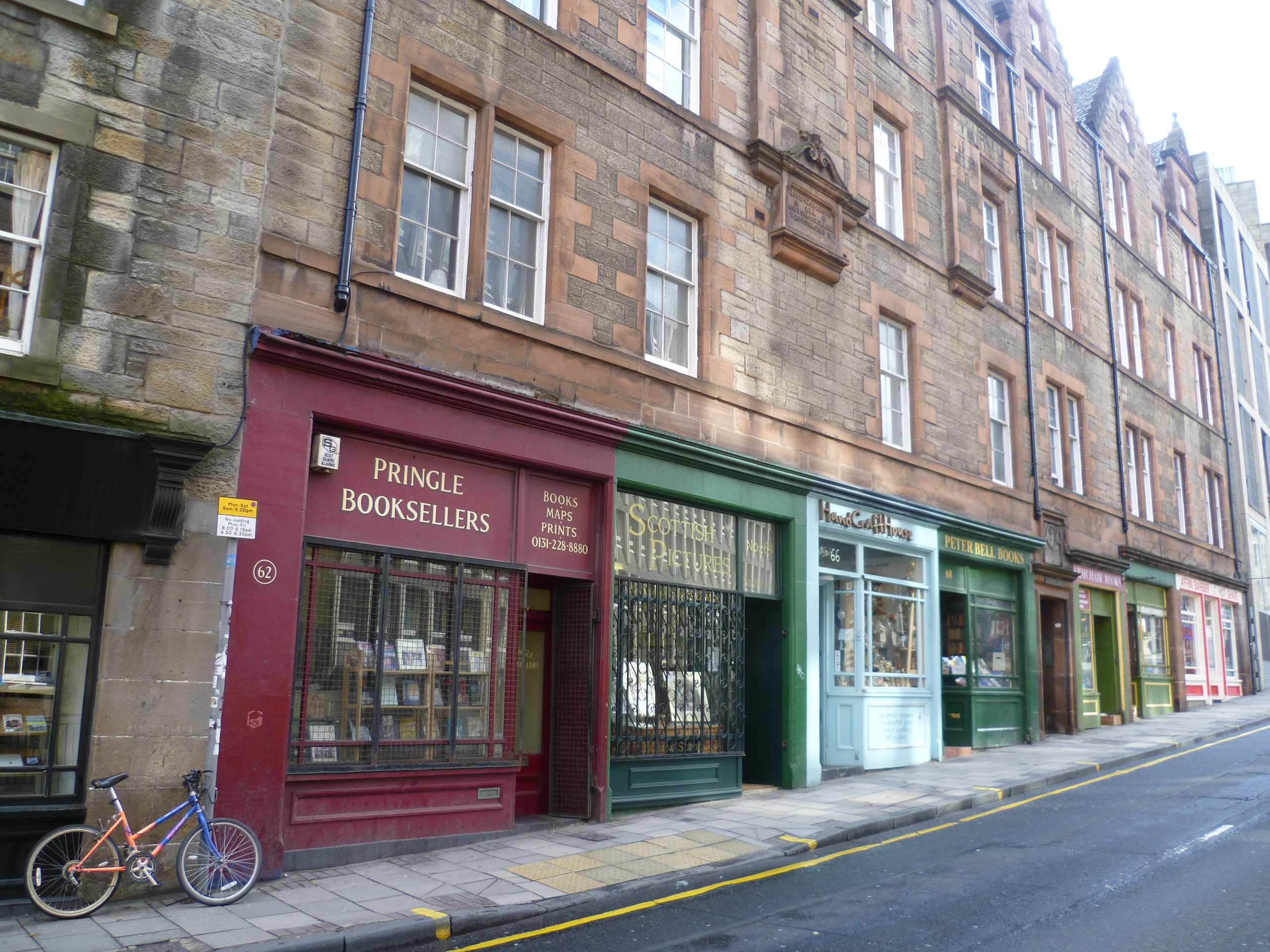
West Port bookshops

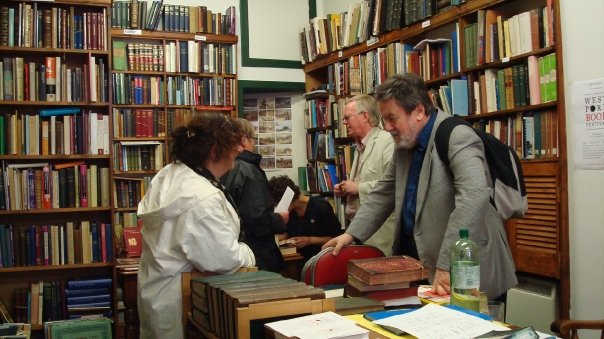
Owen Dudley Edwards talking with an audience member at the West Port Book Festival

The West Port Book Festival was a book festival which was held in Edinburgh from 2008 to 2012. Initially it took place in August during the busy Edinburgh Festival season, but later it was held at different times in the year. The festival was run by Hannah Adcock and Peggy Hughes.

It is of note due to its use of many working second-hand bookshop venues, pubs, fish and chip shops, cafés and art venues in the West Port for most of the events, and its insistence on free tickets for entry. Although the West Port Book Festival received some coverage claiming it was a formal rival to the much larger Edinburgh International Book Festival, the organisers stated that it was designed to complement rather than to challenge its much more famous cousin.

== Programme ==
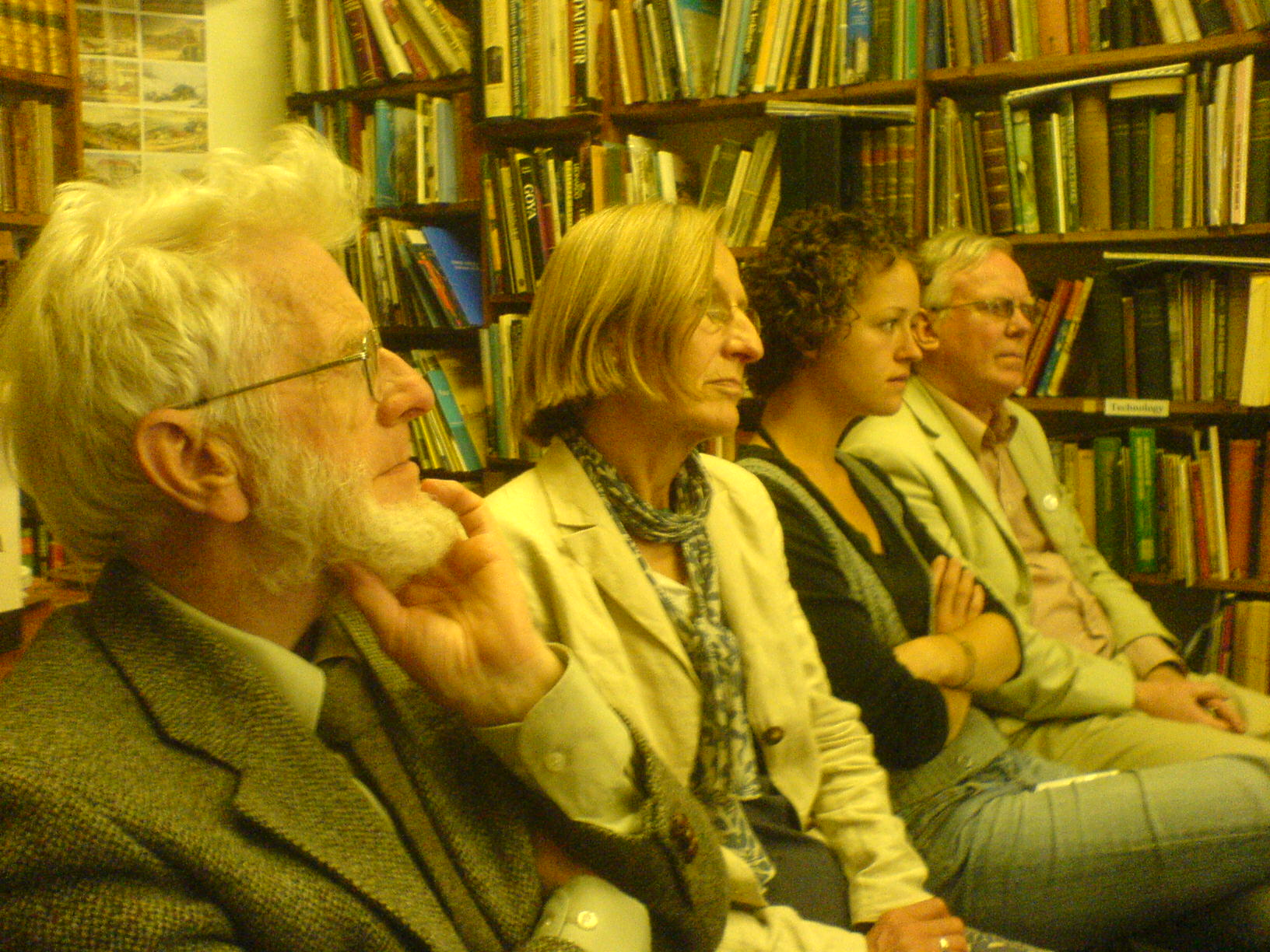
Audience members at a West Port Book Festival event

=== 2008 ===
The first festival included some well known Scottish writers, as well as up and coming authors from around the world, including Ali Smith, Ian Rankin, Douglas Dunn, A. L. Kennedy, Kapka Kassabova, Ronan Sheehan, Rajorshi Chakraborti, Dilys Rose, Dean Parkin, Robert Alan Jamieson, Owen Dudley Edwards, and many others.

=== 2009 ===
As well as featuring poets John Hegley, Tim Turnbull, Jack Underwood, Douglas Dunn and 2009 Forward Poetry Prize nominee J. O. Morgan, novelists Alan Bissett, Eleanor Thom, Elaine di Rollo, Mike Stocks and Gregory Norminton, the 2009 festival also featured a Celtic contingent in the form of Gaelic novelist, poet and actor Angus Peter Campbell and a group of celebrated Irish writers with translations of bawdy poet Catullus, events highlighting unusual non-fiction and magic, and played host to the world's first literary twestival. In this edition two Spanish poets, Jesús Ge and Rocío Ovalle, also participated, with their event "The Word Whirling".

=== 2010 ===
The 2010 festival ran from 24 to 27 June.

=== 2011 ===
The 2011 festival ran from 13 to 16 October.

=== 2012 ===
The 2012 festival ran from 23 to 26 November.
