= Ronan O'Connell =

- Medical career
- Profession: Surgeon
- Institutions: University College Dublin; Royal College of Surgeons in Ireland

Ronan O'Connell MD, FRCSI is emeritus professor of surgery at University College Dublin and past president of the Royal College of Surgeons in Ireland.

== Education ==
O'Connell was born in Dublin, Ireland. He attended and earned his medical degree from Trinity College Dublin in 1979. He completed post-graduate training in colon and rectal surgery at Mayo Clinic in 1986.

== Career ==
O'Connell began his career as a consultant at the London Hospital (1989–1990) and then moved to the Mater Misericordiae University Hospital. In 2002, he was named a Newman Clinical Professor at UCD. In 2007, he moved to St Vincent's University Hospital as Professor of Surgery. He became professor emeritus at UCD in 2017.

He was appointed to the Medical Council of Ireland in July 2023, and is serving a three-year term until 2026.

== Honours ==
O'Connell was named the president of the Royal College of Surgeons in Ireland in 2020, serving until 2022. He has also led the European Surgical Association, and served as its president from 2021 to 2022.
