= Ruth Dudley Edwards =

Irish historian, biographer and crime fiction author

- Born: May 24, 1944 (age 82); Dublin, Ireland
- Education: Girton College, Cambridge; Wolfson College, Cambridge
- Parent: Robert Dudley Edwards
- Relatives: Owen Dudley Edwards (brother)
- Writing career
- Genre: Non-fiction

Ruth Dudley Edwards (born 24 May 1944) is an Irish Unionist historian and writer, with published work in the fields of history, biography and crime fiction, and a number of awards won. Born in Dublin, Ireland, she has lived in England since 1965, and describes herself as British-Irish. Her revisionist approach to Irish history and her views have sometimes generated controversy or ridicule. She has been a columnist with the Irish Sunday Independent, the Daily Telegraph and Sunday Telegraph, and The News Letter.

== Background ==
Dudley Edwards was born and brought up in Dublin, in what she describes as "the Catholic tribe", and first graduated from University College Dublin (UCD). She has said that she loved her time at UCD but subsequently left Ireland to escape the influence of the Catholic Church, and a culture which backed "physical force nationalism." She studied at two Cambridge University colleges, Girton and Wolfson.

Her father was an Irish historian, Professor Robert Dudley Edwards. Her brother Owen Dudley Edwards, a recognised expert on Sherlock Holmes, also pursued a career as an historian, latterly at the University of Edinburgh, while her sister, Mary, is deceased. Dudley Edwards's grandmother, Bridget Dudley Edwards, was an Irish suffragette and a member of Cumann na mBan, a women's organisation designed to support the Irish Volunteers.

== Works ==
Her non-fiction books include An Atlas of Irish History, James Connolly, Victor Gollancz: A Biography (winner of the James Tait Black Memorial Prize), The Pursuit of Reason: The Economist 1843–1993, The Faithful Tribe: An Intimate Portrait of the Loyal Institutions (shortlisted for Channel 4/The House Politico's Book of the Year) and Newspapermen: Hugh Cudlipp, Cecil King and the glory days of Fleet Street.

Her Patrick Pearse: The Triumph of Failure, first published in 1977, which won the National University of Ireland Prize for Historical Research, was reissued in 2006 by Irish Academic Press.

In 2009 she published Aftermath: The Omagh Bombings and the Families' Pursuit of Justice, a book about the civil case that was won on 8 June 2009 against the Omagh bombers. The book won the CWA Gold Dagger for Non-Fiction.

The Faithful Tribe was criticised by Ulster Protestant journalist Susan McKay as "sentimental and blinkered", but the New Statesman contributor Stephen Howe described it as "engrossing and illuminating" and the Irish Independent journalist John A. Murphy described it as "enormously readable, entertaining and informative", but "[her argument] 'extremely disingenuous'", and he quotes Shakespeare, 'The lady doth protest too much, methinks', when describing one of her counter-arguments as 'exaggerated'. He added "Historically in Ireland, Protestant 'liberties' tended to mean Protestant 'privilege,' and many Protestants (even including some United Irishmen) doubted whether Roman Catholics were constitutionally capax libertatis capable of appreciating or enjoying liberty at all, because of Roman tyranny and priest-craft. In short, the Orange Protestant is still benightedly living in the seventeenth and eighteenth centuries: the Southern Catholic, whatever his past intolerances, has moved on.". In 2016 she published The Seven: The Lives and Legacies of the Founding Fathers of the Irish Republic (Oneworld), a re-examination of the Easter Rising, addressing the fundamental questions and myths surrounding the 1916 leaders.

Also a crime fiction writer, her novels, most with a satirical angle, and featuring a British civil servant, Robert Amiss, and later led by Baroness Ida "Jack" Troutbeck, include: Corridors of Death, The Saint Valentine's Day Murders, The English School of Murder, Clubbed to Death, Matricide at St. Martha's, Ten Lords A-leaping, Murder in a Cathedral, Publish and Be Murdered, The Anglo-Irish Murders, Carnage on the Committee, Murdering Americans, and Killing the Emperors (the latter two won awards). She was inducted into the prestigious Detection Club in 1996.

== Journalism ==
Dudley Edwards has been a long-term columnist with the Irish Sunday Independent and the Daily Telegraph and Sunday Telegraph of London, and also writes for The News Letter of Belfast.

== Positions ==
=== Historical revisionism ===
Dudley Edwards has noted that "revisionist" is sometimes used as a term of attack on her and her work, for example by Sinn Féin, a party which she holds is itself revisionist in its handling of some historical narratives. She summarises her own position as "I'm a proud revisionist who believes it is the job of historians to be prepared constantly to revise their opinions in the light of fresh evidence, and that if their conclusions are of national relevance they should defend them publicly." Others view her “revisionist” history as being too biased, lacking in context, and intentionally misleading that her works classified as “nonfiction,” such as the “An Atlas of Irish History,” are better understood as partisan propaganda that would be inappropriate for use in an academic setting.

=== Unionism and anti-Irish republicanism ===
Dudley Edwards describes herself as having grown up in a "Catholic tribe" which "was given an absurdly exaggerated and often invented narrative of their past sufferings which the Protestant tribe were not educated to counter" and has written sympathetically of Ulster Unionism. At the same time, she stated that she is "not in principle against Irish unification". In 2000 Dudley Edwards wrote "I am neither [Irish] nationalist nor unionist, just a democrat."

In a February 2022 column, titled "It's official – I am now a unionist!", she acknowledged that politically she was a Unionist, claiming "the awfulness of Sinn Féin and many of their weaselly fellow-travellers have succeeded in making me embrace unionism".

In a radio debate with historian Tim Pat Coogan over Ken Loach's 2006 film The Wind That Shakes the Barley, in which neither historian had seen the film beforehand, Dudley Edwards was "highly critical of what she saw as being little more than a lopsided, anti-British, pro-IRA propaganda piece. At one point, she suggested that historical accuracy would have been better served if Loach had made reference to the IRA's pogrom against the Protestant population in Cork.", to which Coogan responded that revisionists "ignored the fact that the murdered Protestants of Cork were informers."

=== Brexit ===
Dudley Edwards has described herself as "hardline Brexiteer." She called on the DUP to support Boris Johnson's Brexit deal in October 2019, citing a Unionist friend who said "it could put Northern Ireland in a terrific position as a gateway between the EU and the UK/world economy." She has also called for the Republic of Ireland to leave the EU.

=== Zionism ===
Dudley Edwards proclaimed herself to be an unapologetic Zionist. In her articles she repeatedly criticised the development of Islam in the UK and Palestinian freedom movement.

== Directorships and voluntary posts ==
- Member, Executive Committee of the British-Irish Association 1982–93
- Chairwoman, British Association for Irish Studies 1985–93
- Member, Executive Committee of the Crime Writers' Association 1995–99
- Member of Management Committee of the Society of Authors 1996–99
- Elected to Detection Club 1996
- Director, Centre for Social Cohesion (2009–2013)
