= Medical Practitioners Act 2007 =

Irish health law

The Medical Practitioners Act 2007 is an Act (Number 25 of 2007) of the Oireachtas (Irish parliament). It deals with the regulation of doctors. This act amends previous acts, in particular the Medical Practitioners Act 1978, which was thereby repealed. It was enacted in May 2007.
