= Owen Dudley Edwards =

Irish historian and critic

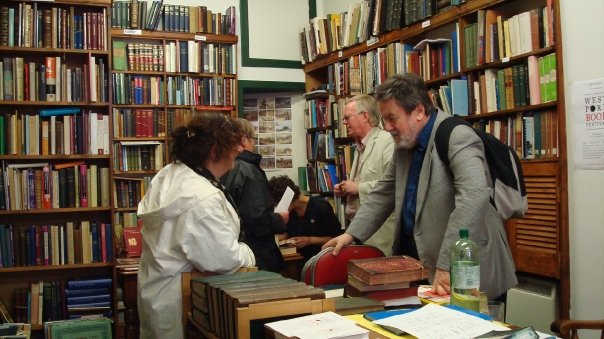
- Owen Dudley Edwards talking with an audience member at the West Port Book Festival
- Spouse: Barbara Balbirnie Lee
- Children: 3, including Sara Parvis
- Parent: Robert Dudley Edwards
- Relatives: Ruth Dudley Edwards (sister)

Academic work
- Institutions: University of Edinburgh

Owen Dudley Edwards (born 27 March 1938) is an Irish historian and former Reader in Commonwealth and American History at the University of Edinburgh, Scotland.

== Life ==
He is the son of Professor Robert Dudley Edwards and brother to the Irish writer, Ruth Dudley Edwards. He is the general editor of the Oxford Sherlock Holmes series, and is a recognised expert on Sir Arthur Conan Doyle, P. G. Wodehouse and Oscar Wilde.

Dudley Edwards attended Belvedere College, Dublin, University College Dublin, and Johns Hopkins University in Baltimore.

In 1966 he married Barbara Balbirnie Lee. They have three children.

== Selected bibliography ==
- Our Nations and Nationalisms (2022)
- British Children's Fiction in the Second World War (2007)
- Hare and Burke (1994) (play)
- City of a Thousand Worlds: Edinburgh in Festival (1991)
- Eamon de Valera (1988)
- The Quest for Sherlock Holmes (1983)
- Burke and Hare (1981; 2nd ed., 1993)
- P. G. Wodehouse: A Critical and Historical Essay (1977)
- The Sins of our Fathers (1970)

== See also ==
- Auditors of the Literary and Historical Society (University College Dublin)
