= Fred Johnston (writer) =

Irish poet, novelist, literary critic and musician

- Born: 1951; Belfast, Northern Ireland
- Died: September 9, 2024 (aged 72–73)
- Occupations: Poet, novelist, literary critic, translator, musician

Fred Johnston (1951-2024) was an Irish poet, novelist, literary critic and musician. He was the founder and current director of the Western Writers' Centre in Galway. He co-founded the Irish Writers' Co-operative in 1974, and founded Galway's annual Cúirt International Festival of Literature in 1986.

== Life ==
Johnson was born in Belfast, Northern Ireland, into a mixed, unorthodox background: his father's side were Belfast, Methodist, and both Unionist and Trade unionist; his mother's side were Dublin, Catholic, followers of Michael Collins and admirers of the Queen. He spent the first seven years of his life in Toronto, Canada.

He went to St Malachy's College's grammar school in Belfast from 1962–68. During these years he learnt guitar and banjo and listened to and played folk music. He performed on the cabaret lounge circuit, made appearances on Ulster TV, released some singles and, aged 16, an LP of rebel and football songs called The Flags Are Out for Celtic.

After school he moved to Dublin and worked in journalism, writing for the Evening Press and The Belfast Telegraph, and in Public Relations. He had several prose pieces published in the New Irish Writing section (edited by David Marcus) of the Evening Press, and won a Hennessy Literary Award (the judges being V. S. Pritchett and James Plunkett) in 1972.

In 1974 he met up with Neil Jordan and Peter Sheridan to found the Irish Writers' Co-operative, a publishing outlet for new Irish fiction. Early publications under its imprint Co-op Books were Desmond Hogan's The Ikon Maker (1976) and Ronan Sheehan's Tennis Players (1977).

He moved to Galway in 1978 and in 1979 published his first collection of poems, Life and Death in the Midlands, and a collection of short stories, Picture of a Girl in a Spanish Hat.

From the early 1980s to the mid 1990s, Johnston contributed poetry and a short story to the Scottish international literature, arts and affairs magazine, Cencrastus.

In 1986 he founded the poetry festival Cúirt, which became an annual literary festival in Galway and is now one of the largest of its kind in Ireland. He ended his association with it in 1988.

In the 1990s he formed an Irish traditional folk group, Parson's Hat, which released two albums: Cutty Wren and The Better Match. Tracks by the group have been included on a number of compilation albums.

In 2000 he received the Prix de l'Ambassade Translation bursary to work on translations of the French poet Michel Martin. He has also translated the Senegalese poet Babacar Sall, and more recently the Breton poet Colette Wittorski.

In 2004 he received The Ireland Fund of Monaco bursary to be writer-in-residence for a month at the Princess Grace Irish Library in Monaco, where he continued working on his novel-in-progress The Neon Rose (published 2007), wrote some new poems, and sourced some Monégasque poems which he later translated.

In 2005 he founded the Western Writers' Centre, or in Irish Ionad Scríbhneoiri Chaitlín Maude (the Caitlín Maude Writers' Centre, after the Galway Gaeltacht poet), which bills itself as "the only writers' centre West of the Shannon". The centre holds readings, lectures, workshops and courses, and organises the Gort literary festival.

He released two solo albums, Get You and Local Papers.

Johnston was a regular poetry reviewer for Poetry Ireland Review and Books Ireland and on occasion for the Southern Humanities Review, The Irish Times and Harpers & Queen, and has contributed to the literary magazines Orbis, New Letters, The Southern Review, The Seneca Review, and Irish Studies Review.

== Books ==
=== Poetry ===
- Life and Death in the Midlands (Enniskerry: Tansy Books, 1979) OCLC 22526179
- A Scarce Light (Dublin: Beaver Row Press, 1985) ISBN 978-0946308347
- Song at the Edge of the World (Galway: Salmon Poetry, 1987) ISBN 978-0948339127
- Measuring Angles (with cassette) (Spiddal: Cló Iar-Chonnachta, 1993) ISBN 978-1874700111
- Browne (Belfast: Lapwing Publications, 1993) ISBN 978-1898472063
- Canzoni con Accompagnamento d'Arpa (Songs for Harp Accompaniment, translated into Italian by Daniele Serafini) (Faenza: MobyDick, 1996) OCLC 35075289
- True North (Cliffs of Moher: Salmon Poetry, 1998) ISBN 978-1897648803
- Being Anywhere: New & Selected Poems (Belfast: Lagan Press, 2001) ISBN 978-1873687635
- Paris Without Maps (Dingwall: Sandstone Press, 2003) ISBN 978-0954231248
- The Oracle Room (Blaenau Ffestiniog: Cinnamon Press, 2007) ISBN 978-1905614219

=== Novels ===
- Atalanta: A Novel (Cork: The Collins Press, 2000) ISBN 978-1898256922
- Mapping God = Le Tracé de Dieu (in English and French) (Galway: Wynkin deWorde, 2003) ISBN 978-0954260798
- The Neon Rose (Bristol: Bluechrome Publishing, 2007) ISBN 978-1906061074

=== Short stories ===
- Picture of a Girl in a Spanish Hat (Enniskerry: Tansy Books, 1979) OCLC 19678188
- Keeping the Night Watch (Cork: The Collins Press, 1998) ISBN 978-1898256-58-8
- Dancing in the Asylum (Cardigan: Parthian Books, 2011) ISBN 978-1906998448

=== Plays ===
- No Earthly Pole

=== Translations ===
- Northern Lights (poems by Colette Wittorski, from French) (Belfast: Lapwing Publications, 2007) ISBN 978-1907276064
