= School of Medicine (Trinity College Dublin) =

Tertiary institution of Medical and Health Sciences in Dublin, Ireland

Coordinates: 53.342994°N 6.252232°W

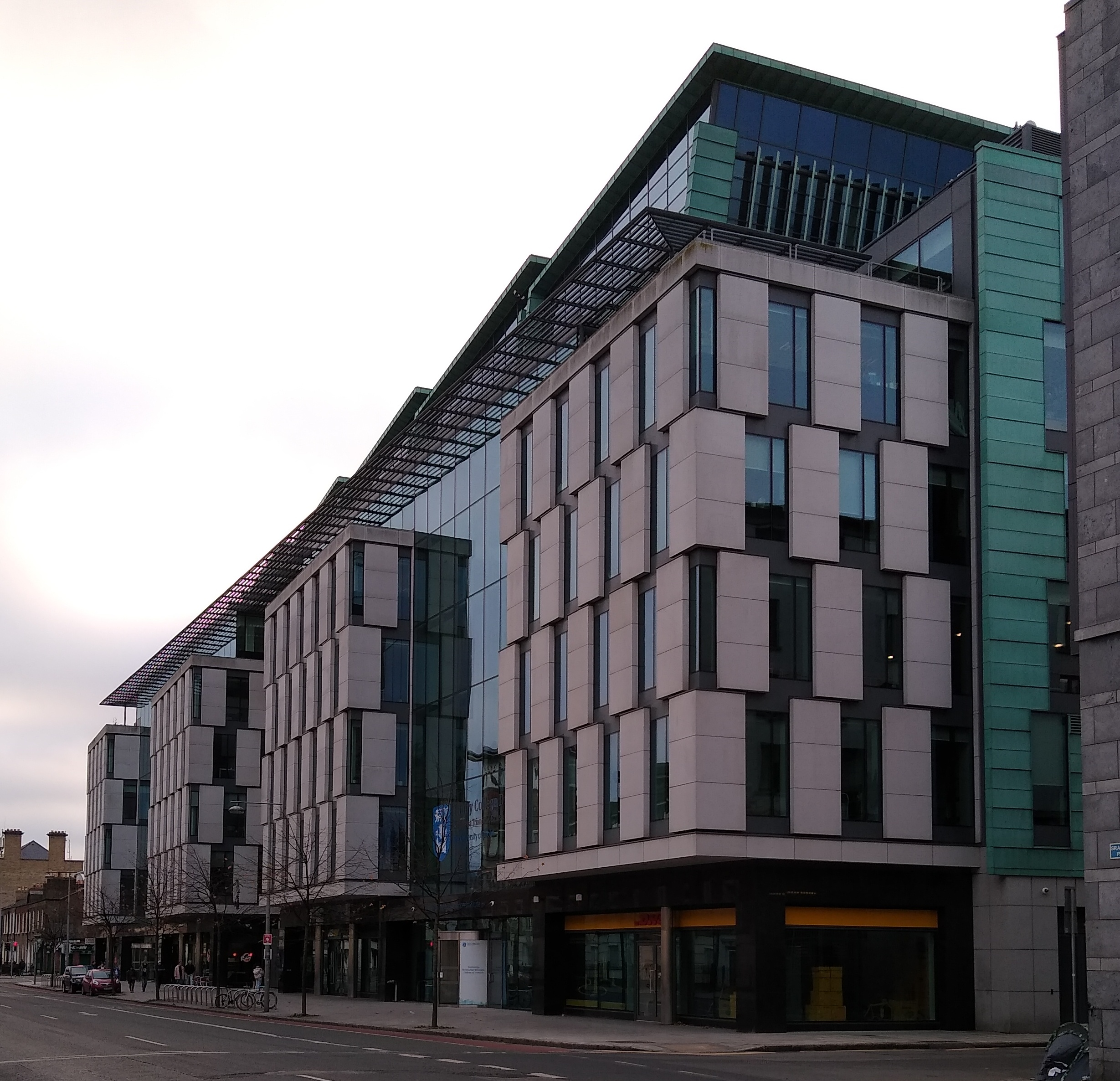
- Trinity Biomedical Sciences Institute
- Former names: School of Physic (-2005)
- Type: Medical school
- Established: 11 August 1711; 1715 (royal charter)
- Affiliations: Trinity College Dublin
- Interim Head: Professor Paul Browne
- Location: Dublin, Ireland
- Campus: Trinity College Dublin St James's Hospital Tallaght University Hospital
- Website: https://www.tcd.ie/medicine/

The School of Medicine at Trinity College in Dublin, Ireland (known until 2005 as the School of Physic), is the oldest medical school in Ireland. Founded in the early eighteenth century, it was originally situated at the site of the current Berkeley Library. As well as providing an undergraduate degree in medicine, the school provides undergraduate courses in physiotherapy, occupational therapy, radiation therapy, human nutrition & dietetics and human health & disease, over 20 taught postgraduate courses, and research degrees.

== History ==
Medical training has taken place at Trinity College since the seventeenth century, originally on a rather unremarkable basis; extant records suggest that by 1616 only one medical degree had been conferred. In a letter to James Ussher in 1628, Provost William Bedell commented, "I suppose it hath been an error all this time to neglect the faculties of law and physic and attend only to the ordering of one poor College of Divines." From 1618 the post of "Medicus" had existed among the Fellows, this post later being formalised under Bedell's revised college statutes in 1628 and by royal letters patent in 1637, but in practice the office was usually held by Junior Fellows who did not hold medical degrees and who participated in no real sense in medical education; for example, the first Fellow to be chosen Medicus, John Temple (son of the then-provost of the college, Sir William Temple), went on to pursue a prominent legal career. The Public (later Regius) Professorship of Physic was for the most part used as ceremonial title for a practising doctor. A 17th-century manuscript preserved in the Trinity College Library, describing the ceremonies accompanying conferral of degrees, makes no mention of graduates in medicine.

The first recorded named holder of a Dublin medical degree was John Stearne, a Trinity graduate who had trained as a doctor in England (possibly at Cambridge), and was appointed a Fellow upon returning to Trinity in 1651. From 1662 until his death in 1669 he was Professor of Physic, and during this time was instrumental in the foundation of a college of physicians, which later became the Royal College of Physicians of Ireland; this institution had originally functioned as a daughter institution of Trinity College, located at the former Trinity Hall on Hoggen Green (now College Green). Trinity Hall had been intended as a place of residence and tuition for students of the college, but a dispute arose, as the property fell into disuse and disrepair following the rebellion of 1641, and Dublin Corporation demanded its return, as the conditions by which the Corporation had provided it to the college were not being upheld. The matter was resolved by Stearne, who offered to raise funds to cover the costs of restoring the building (which the college could not afford at the time) as a daughter college for the education of physicians, with Stearne as its president, and with medical students there first becoming members of Trinity; the agreement stated "that the College should have the nomination of the President of the College of Physicians, and that the President and Fellows of that College should give their professional services without fees to the Provost and Senior Fellows of Trinity College and their successors whenever they should require them to attend them during illness."

A "Colledge of Physitians in Dublin" was thus granted a royal charter in 1667, but no records survive from the time of Stearne's death in 1669 to confirm whether medical students from Trinity were in residence, and in subsequent years the College of Physicians gained virtual independence from the university, largely due to the mother institution being unable to supply sufficient qualified physicians to administer it. The college was given the right of granting medical licences within a radius of seven miles of the city of Dublin. In 1692 it was rechartered as the King and Queen's College of Physicians in Ireland, and provision was made for representatives of the college to examine candidates for medical degrees of the University of Dublin—this arrangement persisting until 1760—and for holders of Dublin medical degrees to be admitted without further examination or fees to the college.

By the 18th century, the board of the college was moved to urgently rectify and formalise the state of its pre-clinical medical education. In 1710 it approved both the construction of a two-storey "Elaboratory" to the west of College Park in Trinity (at the site of the current Berkeley Library), and the establishment of lectureships in anatomy, chemistry and botany. The building was designed by Thomas Burgh and was formally opened on 11 August of the following year with lecture facilities, a dissecting room, a museum and a chemical laboratory. For clinical training, students would then rely on tutorials from the Professor of Physic, and on lectures from same at the Royal College of Physicians. It was agreed with the College of Physicians that, in addition to the normal examinations for all students at the University, medical students would also be examined in "all parts of Anatomy relating to the Œconomia Animalis, and in all parts of Botany, Chemistry, and Pharmacy, and that every candidate Doctor in Physic be examined as to the aforesaid subjects, and likewise in the explanation of Hippocrates' Aphorisms, and in the theory and cure of external and internal diseases."

A bequest drawn up in 1711 by the eminent physician Sir Patrick Dun provided for the endowment of further professorships of physic at Trinity, to be appointed jointly by Trinity, the College of Physicians and the Archbishop of Dublin. To allow this to be carried out, a royal charter was sought to establish the 'School of Physic' under the joint government of both colleges, and this was granted in 1715.

The school expanded significantly in the first half of the 20th century, with the establishment of professorships in pathology, bacteriology and biochemistry, and lecturerships in radiology, anaesthetics and psychological medicine, among others.

== Alumni ==
Notable alumni and former students include:

- George James Allman (1812–1898), British biologist
- George Johnston Allman (1824–1904), Irish mathematician and botanist
- Leonard H. Ball (1900–1966), Australian surgeon
- Edward Hallaran Bennett (1837–1907), Irish surgeon
- Dame Beulah Bewley, British epidemiologist
- Noël Browne (1915–1997), Irish politician and physician
- Denis Parsons Burkitt (1911–1993), Irish surgeon
- Sir Charles Cameron (1841–1924), Scottish politician and newspaper editor
- Sir Dominic Corrigan (1802–1880), Irish physician
- Ara Darzi (born 1960), British surgeon and politician
- David Drummond (1852–1932), British physician and academic
- Michael ffrench-O'Carroll (1919–2007), Irish physician and politician
- Oliver St. John Gogarty (1878–1957), Irish otolaryngologist, writer and politician
- William Crampton Gore (1871–1946), Irish painter
- Robert James Graves (1796–1853), Irish surgeon
- Edward Hand (1744–1802), Irish-American military and political leader
- Samuel Haughton (1795–1873), Irish scientific writer
- William Hayes (1918–1994), Irish-Australian microbiologist and geneticist
- David Healy, Irish psychiatrist
- Mary Henry (born 1940), Irish politician and physician
- William Irvine (1741–1804), Irish-American military and political leader
- Sophia Jex-Blake (1840–1912), British physician, educator and feminist
- Robert Kane (1809–1890), Irish chemist
- Charles Lever (1806–1872), Irish novelist
- John Martin (1812–1875), Irish nationalist
- Joseph Moloney (1857–1896), British military medical officer
- William Fetherstone Montgomery (1797–1859), Irish obstetrician
- George Morrison (born 1922), Irish documentary maker
- Francis Murphy (1809–1891), Australian politician and pastoralist
- Sir Thomas Myles (1857–1937), Irish surgeon and nationalist
- Edmund O'Donovan (1844–1883), British journalist
- Barry Edward O'Meara (1783–1836), Irish surgeon
- Alexander Charles O'Sullivan (1858–1924), Irish pathologist
- Edith Pechey (1845–1908), British physician and feminist
- Maxwell Simpson (1815–1902), Irish chemist
- Robert William Smith (1807–1873), Irish surgeon
- William Stokes (1804–1878), Irish physician
- Sir William Stokes (1839–1900), Irish surgeon
- John Anderson Strong (born 1915), Scottish surgeon and academic
- Jeremy Swan (1922–2005), Irish cardiologist
- John Todhunter (1839–1916), Irish poet and playwright
- Leo Varadkar (born 1979), Taoiseach
- Thomas Wilson (1663–1755), British bishop
- Sir Robert Henry Woods (1865–1938), Irish physician and politician
- Sir Almroth Wright (1861–1947), British bacteriologist and immunologist
