= Medical Council of Ireland =

Regulator of the medical profession in the Republic of Ireland

The Medical Council (Irish: Comhairle na nDochtúirí Leighis) is the regulator of the medical profession in Ireland. It maintains the register of medical practitioners licensed to practice, and has the power to place restrictions on or revoke such licences, in cases of questions about a doctor's fitness to practise. As of 2026 the President of the Medical Council is Professor Deirdre J Murphy, and its Chief Executive Officer is Dr Maria O'Kane.

The objective of the Medical Council is to protect the public by promoting and better ensuring high standards of professional conduct and professional education, training and competence among registered medical practitioners.

== History ==
The council was established by the Medical Practitioners Act 1978 and commenced operation in April 1979. It replaced an earlier body, the Medical Registration Council, which had been established under the provisions of the Medical Practitioners Act 1927, and which took over certain functions from the General Medical Council (the medical regulator for the United Kingdom). Its powers are now dependent on the Medical Practitioners Act 2007.

== Purpose ==
The principal functions of the Medical Council include:

- Establishing and maintaining the register of all medical practitioners in Ireland.
- Setting and monitoring standards for undergraduate, intern and postgraduate medical programmes and the bodies that deliver them ensuring that curricula are in line with Medical Council rules, criteria, standards and guidelines.
- Oversight of lifelong learning and skills development by ensuring that doctors maintain their professional competence by completing professional development and clinical audit activities.
- Specifying standards of practice for registered medical practitioners, including providing guidance on all matters related to professional conduct and ethics.
- Investigating allegations of breach of established professional standards of competence, conduct and ethics, and instigating appropriate measures in respect of doctors against whom complaints have been upheld.

== Services of public interest ==
Managing the register of doctors

The council maintains a publicly accessible searchable database of registered doctors with their qualifications.

Lifelong learning and skills development

In May 2011 the Medical Council introduced requirements for all registered doctors to maintain their professional competence, making it a legal duty to engage in formal arrangements for lifelong learning and skills development. The council oversees doctors to ensure that they fulfil this duty.

Handling complaints

Anyone can make a complaint against a doctor to the Medical Council. The council then begins the formal complaint procedure by forwarding it to the Preliminary Proceedings Committee of the Medical Council, which considers all complaints made to the council. After the committee receives enough information about the complaint it then decides whether to take further action. If so, the complaint is referred to the Fitness to Practise Committee for a Fitness to Practise inquiry. Alternatively, the council could decide to take no further action, refer the complaint to another body or authority, or for mediation, or could refer the doctor for a performance assessment.

Setting ethical standards

The Medical Council gives guidance on all matters related to professional conduct and ethics for registered doctors.

== About the Medical Council ==
The council consists of 25 members and includes both elected and appointed members. Under the provisions of the Medical Practitioners Act, 2007, the new Council is composed of 13 non-medical members and 12 medical members representing a range of medical specialities, teaching bodies, and members of the public and stakeholders. All appointments must be approved by the Minister for Health. The council that took office in 2013 will remain in office until 2018.

The Medical Council is required by law to establish an Education and Training Committee (known as the Professional Development Committee), a Preliminary Proceedings Committee, a Fitness to Practise Committee and a Health Sub-committee. Only members of the Medical Council may be eligible to chair the Fitness to Practise Committee and the Preliminary Proceedings Committee. The council may establish as many committees as it considers necessary to carry out specific functions.

== Administration ==
On 15 June 2009 the Medical Council moved to premises in Kingram House, Kingram Place, Dublin 2. Kingram House, located just off Fitzwilliam Square, is a singularly distinctive building characterised by its odd blend of Georgian and contemporary architecture. Front-of-house, a two-story listed building, was once home to an infant school and links directly on to a modern office suite.

The Medical Council has a staff of over 50 who work in three directorates (Professional Development and Practice, Regulation and Finance and Administration) reporting to the chief executive officer. The council's communications function sits within the CEO's office. The Medical Practitioners Act 2007 sets out the functions of the CEO and Committees of the council. It also specifies functions reserved for the Minister for Health and Children, such as agreement to the creation of new specialities. The Act gives the CEO an independent responsibility to present disciplinary inquiries to the Fitness to Practise Committee, once a decision has been made that a prima facie case exists for an enquiry. To carry out this function, the CEO is empowered to collect evidence and employ legal representatives to present the case.

The council is funded exclusively by the annual payments of registered medical practitioners. The annual retention fee for a fully registered medical practitioner was set at €490 in 2012. According to the Medical Council's 2011 Annual Report, there were 18,812 medical practitioners, including various registration categories, registered with the Medical Council.

380 new complaints against doctors were received in 2011, a five percent increase. Of these new complaints, 15 doctors received sanctions and six doctors had conditions imposed on them. Eight doctors were struck off the register.

In 2011 the Medical Council inspected 6 medical schools and 38 clinical sites. The Medical Council is responsible for setting and monitoring standards for undergraduate education and training in Ireland. This is done by establishing standards and producing guidelines on medical curriculum, content, student conduct and behaviour. The council may fully approve, conditionally approve or refuse to approve medical schools or programmes.
