= Literary and Historical Society (University College Dublin) =

Irish collegiate student group

The Literary and Historical Society (L&H) is the oldest society in University College Dublin (UCD), which according to its constitution is the 'College Debating Union'. Founded in 1855 by Cardinal John Henry Newman, as of 2017 it had over 5000 enrolled members, and was previously the largest student society in UCD.

== History ==
The L&H was founded in 1855, a year after the foundation of the Catholic University of Ireland, the precursor to UCD. Both the university and the debating society were founded by Father John Henry Newman (future Cardinal Newman). One of the society's most famous members from this era was James Joyce, who presented his paper "Drama and Life" before a crowd of assembled members in 1900. A number of the college's societies, including the UCD Student Union itself, can trace their roots to the L&H.

In 1961, the L&H was temporarily "suspended" by the academic council of UCD.

The society's debates were originally held in the Physics Theatre in Earlsfort Terrace. Following the move of UCD's main campus to Belfield, the society relocated its activities in 1972.

A 150th anniversary book, edited by Frank Callanan SC, was published in 2005 to update James Meenan's centenary history of the society, published in 1955. The book, together with the reprinted centenary history, covers the society's history and includes articles by personalities from its past, including Maeve Binchy, Owen Dudley Edwards, Vincent Browne, Kevin Myers, Adrian Hardiman and Michael McDowell.

== Activities ==
=== Guest speakers and awards ===
The L&H regularly invites speakers outside of debates. Former speakers have included actor Roger Moore, economist Paul Krugman, linguist Noam Chomsky, Irish politician John Hume, LGBTQ+ activist Rory O'Neil aka Panti Bliss, photographer and blogger Brandon Stanton, writer Bill Bryson, economist John Nash and British writer Neil Gaiman.

The society awards Honorary Fellowships and James Joyce Awards to individuals who have "contributed significantly to a field of human endeavour". Recipients of either of the two awards include F. W. de Klerk, Rev. Jesse Jackson, Noam Chomsky and Prime Minister of Australia John Howard, actor Ralph Fiennes, actor Will Ferrell, author J. K. Rowling, former UN Chief Weapons Inspector Hans Blix, novelist Bill Bryson, former England soccer captain Gary Lineker, The Beatles' producer George Martin, Monty Python member Michael Palin, actor Martin Freeman, writer Salman Rushdie. and Irish author Liz Nugent. In 2025 the society planned to give the award to author John Boyne but later withdrew the offer.

=== Competitive debating ===
The L&H has won a number of international debating competitions and has won The Irish Times and Mace debating competitions as well as international and national intervarsities. The society has attended the World Universities Debating Championship, in Asia, Australia, Africa and North America, reaching the grand final in both 2000 and 2002. In 1987 and 2006, UCD hosted the World Universities Debating Championship.

The society also promotes and organises competitive debating in schools across Ireland through the Schools' Mace, the Leinster Schools Debating Competition (co-organised by Trinity's College Historical Society) and the UCD Junior Schools Debating Competition, which reach secondary schools throughout the country.

== Organisation ==
The L&H is run by a committee each with specific responsibilities. The committee is chosen by the auditor, who is elected on a yearly basis by the enrolled membership of the society. The auditor is the head of the committee and responsible for the general running of the society. Each session begins around the beginning of March, on the date of the Annual General Meeting. The new auditor for the coming year is appointed at this meeting, either as the result of an election from the enrolled membership or, in cases where a single candidate is unopposed, by nomination.

Notable former auditors of the society include former President of Ireland and Chief Justice Cearbhall Ó Dálaigh, comedians Dara Ó Briain and Jarlath Regan, suffragist and writer Francis Sheehy-Skeffington and Irish Supreme Court judge Adrian Hardiman. James Joyce ran for election to the post of auditor twice, and was defeated on both occasions. Conor Cruise O'Brien served as vice president of the society for a period.

The 153rd session of the society recorded record membership for any university society in Europe. The membership exceeded 5,000 members, surpassing by several hundred the previous record, also set by the L&H in its 150th session. The 159th session of the society again broke this record, making it the university's largest ever society.

== See also ==
- Auditors of the Literary and Historical Society (University College Dublin)
- List of college literary societies
