= Cab rank =

A cab rank (in British English) or taxicab stand (in American English) is an area where taxicabs queue to await passengers.

Cab rank may also refer to:

- Bank (in Cockney rhyming slang)
- A flying reserve of fighter-bomber aircraft that can be called in to provide close air support (the term cab rank was used by the RAF during World War II)
- Cab-rank rule, the obligation in English law of a barrister to accept any work in a field in which he professes himself competent, at a court at which he normally appears and at his usual rates
