= Donal O'Donnell =

Chief Justice of Ireland since 2021

The Hon. Mr Justice Donal O'Donnell
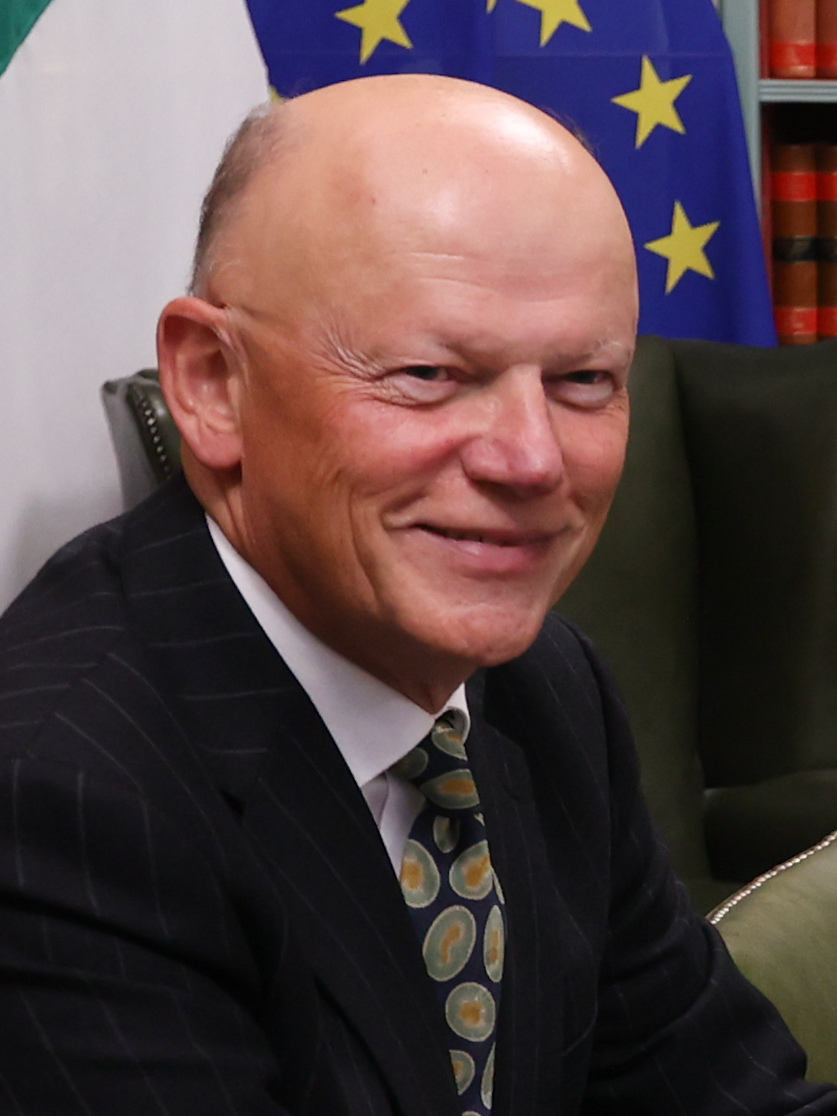
- O'Donnell in 2022

Chief Justice of Ireland
- Incumbent
- Assumed office 11 October 2021
- Nominated by: Government of Ireland
- Appointed by: Michael D. Higgins
- Preceded by: Frank Clarke

Judge of the Supreme Court
- Incumbent
- Assumed office 20 January 2010
- Nominated by: Government of Ireland
- Appointed by: Mary McAleese

Personal details
- Born: Donal Gerard O'Donnell; 25 October 1957 (age 68) Belfast, Northern Ireland
- Spouse: Mary Rose Binchy (m. 1992)
- Children: 4
- Parent: Turlough O'Donnell (father)
- Education: University College Dublin; University of Virginia; King's Inns

Donal Gerard O'Donnell (born 25 October 1957) is an Irish jurist who has served as the Chief Justice of Ireland since October 2021. He has served as a Judge of the Supreme Court of Ireland since January 2010. He practised as a barrister between 1982 and 2010, specialising in commercial law and public law.

== Early life ==
He was born in Belfast, in 1957. He was educated at St. Mary's Christian Brothers' Grammar School, Belfast, University College Dublin, King's Inns and the University of Virginia. While attending University College Dublin, he won the 1978 Irish Times Debate with Conor Gearty for the UCD Law Society. He graduated from Virginia in 1983, where he wrote a research paper comparing equality under the US and Irish constitutions, supervised by A.E. Dick Howard. Janet Napolitano was also among the class of 1983.

His brother Turlough O'Donnell SC is former chairman of the Bar Council of Ireland. He comes from a legal family, his father, The Rt. Hon Turlough O'Donnell PC, was a member of the High Court of Northern Ireland and of the Court of Appeal of Northern Ireland between 1971 and 1990.

== Legal career ==
He was called to the Bar of Ireland in 1982. He was then later called to the Bar of Northern Ireland in 1989. He became a Senior Counsel in October 1995. He has practised in all courts in Ireland, Northern Ireland, European Court of Justice (ECJ) and the European Court of Human Rights (ECHR). He was known for his speciality in constitutional law, frequently appearing on behalf of the State. In 1995-96 he represented the BTSB in the Brigid McCole case, eventually settling her case for damages. He successfully represented the applicants from the Garda Síochána after the death of John Carthy in a constitutional challenge which limited the powers of investigation of the Oireachtas, which led to the unsuccessful Thirtieth Amendment of the Constitution. He acted for the State in Zappone v. Revenue Commissioners, Roche v Roche and Miss D. In Michael Ring's challenge to a ban on a dual mandate he acted for the State and represented Micheál Martin in an action taken by Kathy Sinnott challenging the results of the 2002 general election in Cork South-Central. He was counsel for Michael Lowry at the Moriarty Tribunal. In 2002, he represented eighteen religious groups in a negotiation with the Minister for Education Michael Woods. He acted for Ireland in the European Court of Human Rights in 2009 in A, B and C v Ireland.

O'Donnell's practice also extended to commercial law. He and Paul Gallagher acted for a group of tobacco companies in 2004 challenging restrictions on tobacco advertising and he appeared for the estate of James Joyce in a copyright action against Cork University Press in 2000. He represented the Beef Industry Development Society Ltd in a 2008 case in the ECJ which clarified the meaning of an agreement under Article 101 of the Treaty on the Functioning of the European Union. In 2007 he and Paul Anthony McDermott acted for Elin Nordegren in libel proceedings against The Dubliner. He also appeared in cases involving insolvency law, employment law, company law and contract law.

O'Donnell was a member of the Law Reform Commission from 2005 to 2012. He became a Bencher of the King's Inns in 2009. In 2026, he was made a member of the Royal Irish Academy.

== Judicial career ==
O'Donnell was appointed to the Supreme Court in 2010. He was appointed directly from practice to Ireland's highest court, a rare direct appointment. His appointment followed Nicholas Kearns becoming President of the High Court.

There have been several distinctive and innovative features of his Supreme Court judgments, including writing joint opinions and opting to delay a declaration of unconstitutionality, instead of no declaration at all, to enable the government to take action before a judgment takes effect. Ruadhán Mac Cormaic of The Irish Times says O'Donnell has a reputation for elegant writing and having a "socially liberal" approach.

=== Chief Justice of Ireland ===
He was reported to have been one of three judges shortlisted to be the 12th Chief Justice of Ireland in July 2017; however, Frank Clarke was chosen. On 28 May 2021, he was nominated by the government to become the 13th Chief Justice of Ireland following Clarke's retirement in October 2021. He was appointed on 11 October 2021, by President Michael D. Higgins at a ceremony at Áras an Uachtaráin.

== Personal life ==
He is married to Mary Rose Binchy, an artist, with whom he has four children.

Legal offices
Preceded by Frank Clarke	Chief Justice of Ireland; 2021–present	Incumbent
