= Irish bar =

Irish bar may refer to:

- Irish pub, a drinking establishment
- Barristers in Ireland, regulated by the Bar Council of Ireland
- Barristers in Northern Ireland, regulated by the Bar of Northern Ireland

== See also ==
- No Irish need apply, various Irish protest songs about anti-Irish employment discrimination in the late-19th century
