= Averil Deverell =

First woman called to the bar in Ireland

- Born: 2 January 1893; Dublin
- Died: 11 February 1979, aged 86
- Education: Trinity College Dublin
- Occupation: Barrister
- Known for: One of the first two women to be admitted to the bar in either Ireland or Great Britain; The first woman to act as a barrister in the United Kingdom

Averil Katherine Statter Deverell (2 January 1893 – 11 February 1979) was one of the first two women barristers in all of Great Britain and Ireland.

== Biography ==
Deverell was born on 2 January 1893 in Dublin to William Deverell and Ada Kate Statter Carr. Her father was a solicitor who became Clerk of the Crown and Peace for County Wicklow, and her mother was the daughter of a London solicitor. She had a twin brother, William Berenger Statter Deverell (1893–1966), who also became a barrister. Her cousin, Naomi Constance Wallace (1891–1980), would be called to the bar at the Middle Temple a year after Deverell, in November 1922. Growing up in Greystones, she was taught by her governess until she attended the French School, Bray, while socialising with Irish aristocracy at home.

Deverell attended Trinity College, Dublin (TCD), in 1911, a few years after it opened its doors to women in 1904, and was awarded an LLB in 1915. She joined Trinity’s St John Ambulance VAD unit in 1912 and drove an ambulance in France during the First World War from July to December 1918. When the law changed in 1919 to allow women to become barristers, she and Frances Kyle read for the bar at the King's Inns. She was given an exemption from the full requirements because of her service during the war.

When she and Frances Kyle were called to the bar on 1 November 1921, the admission of two women made international headlines. As she was called to the bar in November 1921, which pre-dated the Anglo-Irish Treaty, and her first case being in January 1922 before the treaty was implemented, she was officially the first woman to act as a barrister in the entire United Kingdom, as all of Ireland remained within the United Kingdom until 6 December 1922.

In January 1922, Deverell joined the Law Library of the Four Courts, where she was the only woman until the arrival of Mary Dillon-Leetch in June 1923. The Library was heavily damaged during the Irish Civil War and was relocated to Dublin Castle until 1931. As a financial supplement to her work, she bought a Cairn Terrier with her first fee, and went on to set up a kennels, becoming a breeder of the dogs. Deverell was the first woman to appear in the Supreme Court of Ireland and the Court of Criminal Appeal in Ireland. In 1928, she became the first Irish female barrister to appear before the Judicial Committee of the Privy Council (JCPC) in London.

== See also ==
- First women lawyers around the world
