= LDAC =

LDAC may refer to:

== Science and technology ==
- LDAC (codec), an audio codec used in Bluetooth
- Linz-Donawitz-Arbed-Centre-National method (LDAC method), at the Minière et Métallurgique de Rodange

== Organisations ==
- Learning Disabilities Association of Canada, an association in support of children with learning disabilities
- Long Distance Advisory Council, of the European Fisheries Control Agency
- Land and Building Advisory Committee, in North East New Territories New Development Areas Planning, Hong Kong

== Other uses ==
- Leader Development and Assessment Course, of the US Army's Reserve Officers' Training Corps
- Letterman Digital Arts Center, San Francisco, US
