= Inn of Court =

An Inn of Court is training and professional association of lawyers, in particular:

For barristers

- Inn of Court (England and Wales), one of four bodies based in London
- King's Inns, Dublin, Ireland
- Northern Ireland Inn of Court, Belfast

Other

- American Inns of Court, United States forums discussing ethics, skills, and professionalism

== See also ==
- Bar council, a regulatory association often linked to one or more Inns of Court
- Inns of Chancery, for clerks of chancery, associated with the London Inns of Court
