= Cab-rank rule =

English legal obligation to accept clients

In English law (and other countries which adopt the rule), the cab-rank rule is the obligation of a barrister to accept any work in a field in which they profess themselves competent to practise, at a court at which they normally appear, and at their usual rates. The rule derives its name from the tradition by which a hackney carriage driver at the head of a queue of taxicabs is obliged to take the first passenger requesting a ride.

The cab rank rule is set out at rC29 of the Bar Standards Board Handbook. It states that if the barrister receives instructions from a professional client and the instructions are appropriate taking into account their experience, seniority and/or field of practice, they must (subject to the exceptions in rC30) accept those instructions irrespective of:

1. The identity of the client;
2. The nature of the case to which the instructions relate;
3. Whether the client is paying privately or is publicly funded; and
4. Any belief or opinion which the barrister may have formed as to the character, reputation, cause, conduct, guilt or innocence of the client.

== History ==
The ethos of the rule is thought to originate with Thomas Erskine, a prominent and wealthy barrister with links to the leader of the Whig Party, Charles James Fox, who was himself a sympathiser with French revolutionaries.

Erskine – against the advice of his friends, who suspected that it would likely affect his political career – took on the case of Thomas Paine, who was being tried in absentia for seditious libel for the publication of the second part of his Rights of Man. Erskine's speech while defending Paine – unsuccessfully – is noted for a passage on the duty of barristers to take on even unpopular cases:

I will for ever, at all hazards, assert the dignity, independence, and integrity of the English Bar, without which impartial justice, the most valuable part of the English constitution, can have no existence. From the moment that any advocate can be permitted to say that he will or will not stand between the Crown and the subject arraigned in the court where he daily sits to practise, from that moment the liberties of England are at an end.

An important element of the cab-rank rule was outlined by Lord Brougham during the Trial of Queen Caroline, where he asserted the paramount importance of advocates' zealous defence of their clients, even in circumstances where such spirited defence could threaten the very safety of the nation:

[A]n advocate, by the sacred duty of his connection with his client, knows, in the discharge of that office, but one person in the world, that client and none other. To save that client by all expedient means - to protect that client at all hazards and costs to all others, and among others to himself - is the highest and most unquestioned of his duties; and he must not regard the alarm, the suffering, the torment, the destruction, which he may bring upon any other; nay, separating, even the duties of a patriot from those of an advocate, he must go on reckless of the consequences, if his fate it should unhappily be, to involve his country in confusion for his client.

In the 1970s, the cab-rank rule was tested. The Birmingham Six, who were accused as bombers from the Irish Republican Army, were due to be tried at the Old Bailey in London. Due to difficulties in instructing any counsel willing to represent the defendants, the Bar was reminded of its duties under the cab-rank rule.

In 2006, a barrister was reprimanded by the Bar Standards Board for refusing to argue a case premised on the client's homosexual relationship, in violation of his own conscience.

The cab-rank rule has been adopted by a number of other common law jurisdictions, including Ireland, and Australia – but, notably, not the United States.

== Ireland ==
As the Irish legal system inherits from the English common law system, its barristers also abide by the cab-rank rule. In 2020, Fianna Fáil politician and later Minister for Justice, Jim O'Callaghan, defended representing former Sinn Féin leader, Gerry Adams, in a libel case against the publisher of the Sunday World in 2015. Mr O'Callaghan and the Bar of Ireland stated that barristers can not discriminate against clients based on their politics. The rule was also controversial during the 2025 Irish presidential election when left-wing candidate and subsequent winner, Catherine Connolly, refused to confirm if she ever represented a financial institution to evict an Irish family from their home. She and the Bar of Ireland defended her position stating the cab-rank rule requires barristers to accept work that is offered. Although it is claimed that barristers can decline work, if they really wanted to.

== Controversies ==
Addressing the continued necessity for the rule in 2010, the Law Society of England and Wales, which represents solicitors, together with the Bar Council questioned its necessity, highlighting increases in competition. The Bar Standards Board requested and received an independent report on the cab-rank rule. After reviewing this report, the board issued a press release titled "Removal of the 'cab rank' rule a major threat to justice", arguing that the rule protected lawyers from the stigma of defending an unpopular client.

In 2023, more than one hundred lawyers, including six KCs (King's Counsel) declared that they would not serve certain clients in light of the severe consequences of global warming. The Bar Standards Board and the Bar Council immediately issued press releases reaffirming the nature and importance of the cab rank rule.

There is also debate about exceptions to the rule, such as strategic litigation against public participation and sanctions relating to Russia.
