= Barrister =

Type of lawyer

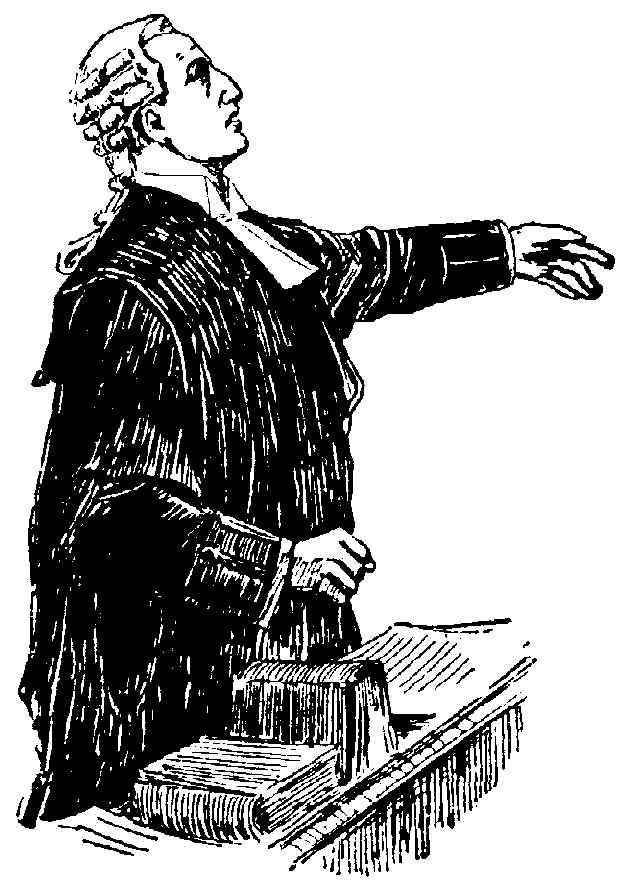
- Illustration of an English barrister

Occupation
- Occupation type: Profession
- Activity sectors: Law; Jurisprudence; Justice; Politics; Legal history; Human rights; Intellectual property

Description
- Education required: England and Wales: law degree/other degree followed by law conversion, then Bar Course then pupillage; Ireland: Barrister-at-Law degree with pupillage; Hong Kong: Postgraduate Certificate in Laws with pupillage
- Fields of employment: Barristers' chambers, government, public sector, charity and not-for-profit, sole trader, companies, law firm
- Related jobs: Pupil barrister, advocate, judge, general counsel, in-house counsel, magistrate, attorney, solicitor

A barrister is a type of lawyer in common law jurisdictions that originated in the Inns of Court of the medieval English legal system. Barristers mainly specialise in courtroom advocacy and litigation. Their tasks include arguing cases in courts and tribunals, drafting legal pleadings, researching the law and negotiation.

Barristers are distinguished from solicitors and other types of lawyers (e.g. chartered legal executives) who have more direct access to clients, and may do transactional legal work. In some legal systems, including those of South Africa, Scandinavia, Pakistan, India, Bangladesh, and the Isle of Man, some court advocates and magistrates use the term barrister as an informal honorific.

In a few jurisdictions barristers are usually forbidden from "conducting" litigation, and can only act on the instructions of another lawyer, who perform tasks such as corresponding with parties and the court, and drafting court documents. In England and Wales barristers may seek authorisation from the Bar Standards Board to conduct litigation, allowing a barrister to practise in a dual capacity.

In some common law jurisdictions, such as New Zealand and some Australian states and territories, lawyers are entitled to practise both as barristers and solicitors, but it remains a separate system of qualification to practise exclusively as a barrister. In others, such as the United States, the distinction between barristers and attorneys-at-law does not exist at all.

== Differences between barristers and other lawyers ==
A barrister is a lawyer who represents a litigant as an advocate before a court. A barrister speaks in court and presents the case before a judge, with or without a jury. In some jurisdictions, a barrister receives additional training in evidence law, ethics and court practice and procedure. In contrast, other legal professionals (such as solicitors and chartered legal executives) generally meet with clients, perform preparatory and administrative work, and provide legal advice. Barristers often have little or no direct contact with their clients. All correspondence, inquiries, invoices and so on will be addressed to the legal adviser, who is also primarily responsible for the barrister's fees.

In England and Wales, solicitors and chartered legal executives can support barristers when in court, such as managing through large volumes of documents in the case or negotiating a settlement outside the courtroom.

A barrister will usually have rights of audience in the higher courts, whereas other legal professionals will often have more limited access, or will need to acquire additional qualifications to have such access. In common law countries, in which there is a split between the roles of barrister and solicitor, the barrister in civil law cases is responsible for appearing in trials and other proceedings before the courts; such as injunction hearings.

Barristers usually have particular knowledge of case law, precedent, and the skills to build a case. When another legal professional is confronted with an unusual point of law, they may seek the opinion of a barrister on the issue.

In most countries, barristers operate as sole practitioners and are prohibited from forming partnerships or from working as a barrister as part of a corporation. In 2009 the Clemens Report recommended the abolition of this restriction in England and Wales. However, barristers normally band together into barristers' chambers to share clerks (administrators) and operating expenses. Some chambers grow to be large and sophisticated. In some jurisdictions, barristers may be employed by firms and companies as in-house legal advisers.

In court, barristers may be visibly distinguished from solicitors, chartered legal executives, and other legal practitioners by their apparel. For example, in criminal courts in Ireland, England and Wales, a barrister usually wears a horsehair wig, stiff collar, bands and a gown. Since January 2008, solicitor advocates have also been entitled to wear wigs, but wear different gowns.

In many countries the traditional divisions between barristers and other legal representatives are gradually decreasing. Barristers once enjoyed a monopoly on appearances before the higher courts, but particularly within the United Kingdom this is no longer true. Solicitor-advocates and qualified chartered legal executives can generally appear on behalf of clients at trial. Increasingly, law firms are keeping even the most advanced advisory and litigation work in-house for economic and client relationship reasons. Similarly, the prohibition on barristers taking instructions directly from the public has also been widely abolished. But, in practice, direct instruction is still a rarity in most jurisdictions, partly because barristers with narrow specialisations, or who are only really trained for advocacy, are not prepared to provide general advice to members of the public.

Historically, barristers have had a major role in trial preparation, including drafting pleadings and reviewing evidence. In some areas of law, that is still the case. In other areas, it is relatively common for the barrister to receive the brief from the instructing solicitor to represent a client at trial only a day or two before the proceeding. Part of the reason for this is cost. A barrister is entitled to a "brief fee" when a brief is delivered, and this represents the bulk of his or her fee in relation to any trial. They are then usually entitled to a "refresher" for each day of the trial after the first, but if a case is settled before trial, the barrister is not needed and the brief fee would be wasted. Some solicitors avoid this by delaying delivery of the brief until it is certain the case will go to trial.

=== Justification for a split profession ===
Some of the benefits of maintaining the split include:

- Having an independent barrister reviewing a course of action gives the client a fresh and independent opinion from an expert in the field distinct from solicitors who may maintain ongoing and long-term relationships with the client.
- In many jurisdictions, judges are appointed from the bar (members of the profession of barrister within a given jurisdiction). Since barristers do not have long-term client relationships and are further removed from clients than solicitors, judicial appointees are more independent.
- Having recourse to all of the specialist barristers at the bar can enable smaller firms, who could not maintain large specialist departments, to compete with larger firms.
- A barrister acts as a check on the solicitor conducting the trial; if it becomes apparent that the claim or defence has not been properly conducted by the solicitor prior to trial, the barrister can (and usually has a duty to) advise the client of a separate possible claim against the solicitor.
- Expertise in conducting trials, since barristers are specialist advocates.
- In many jurisdictions, barristers must follow the cab-rank rule, which obliges them to accept a brief if it is in their area of expertise and if they are available, facilitating access to justice for the unpopular.

Some disadvantages of the split include:

- A multiplicity of legal advisers can lead to less efficiency and higher costs.
- Because they are further removed from the client, barristers can be less familiar with the client's needs.

== Regulation ==
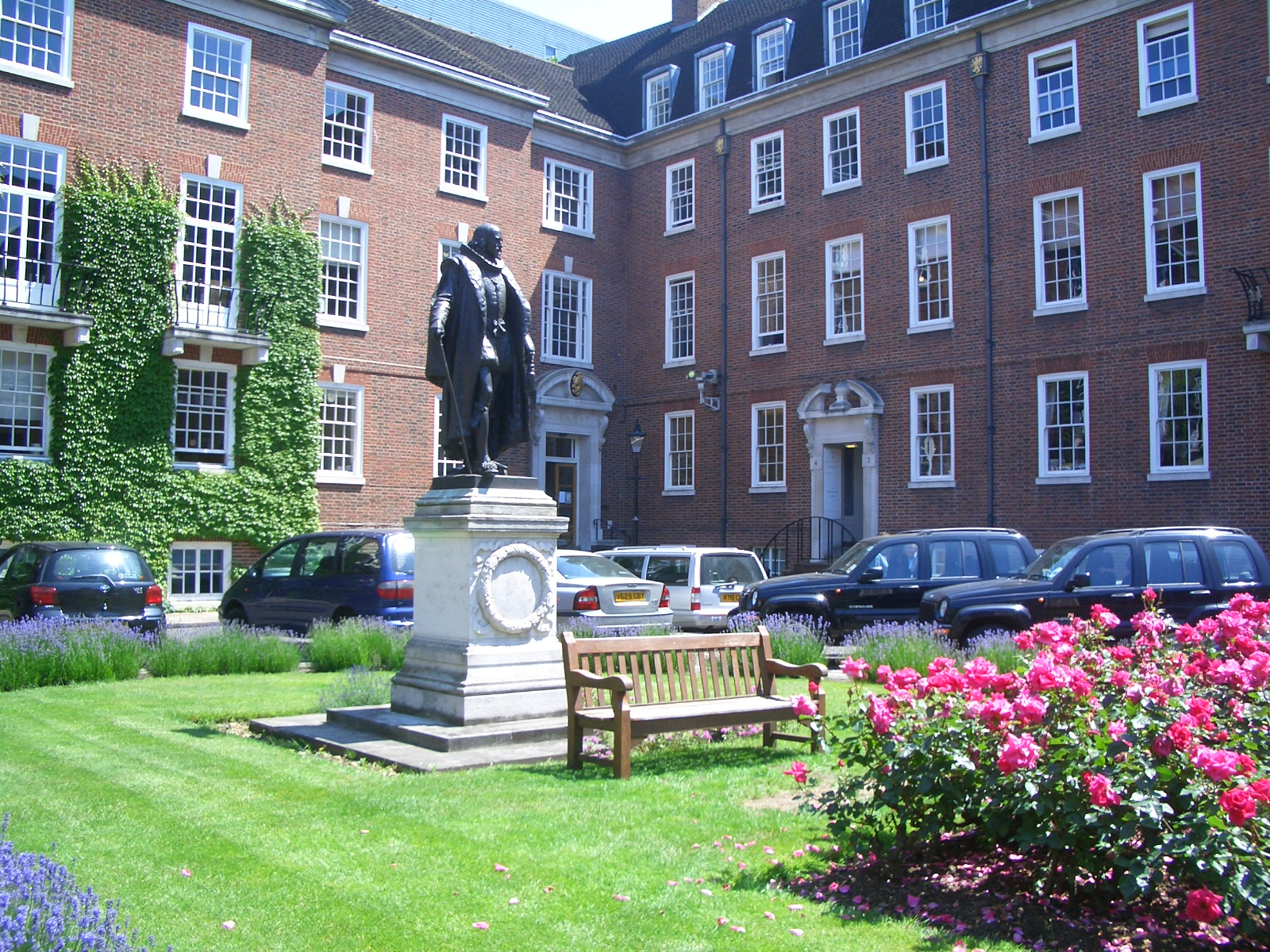
Gray's Inn, London

Barristers are regulated by the Bar for the jurisdiction where they practice, and in some countries, by the Inn of Court to which they belong. In some countries, there is external regulation.

Inns of Court, where they exist, regulate admission to the profession. Inns of Court are independent societies that are responsible for the training, admission, and discipline of barristers. Where they exist, a person may only be called to the bar by an Inn, of which they must be a member. Historically, call to and success at the bar, to a large degree, depended upon social connections made early in life.

A bar collectively describes all members of the profession of barrister within a given jurisdiction. While as a minimum the bar is an association embracing all its members, it is usually the case, either de facto or de jure, that the bar is invested with regulatory powers over the manner in which barristers practice.

== Barristers around the world ==
In the common law tradition, the respective roles of a lawyer, as legal adviser and advocate, were formally split into two separate, regulated sub-professions. Historically, the distinction was absolute, but in the modern age, some countries that had a split legal profession now have a fused profession. In practice, the distinction in split jurisdictions may be minor, or marked. In some jurisdictions, such as Australia, Scotland and Ireland, there is little overlap.

=== Australia ===
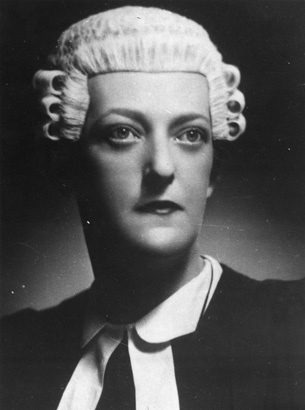
Margaret Battye, 1930s Australian court dress

In the Australian states of New South Wales, Victoria and Queensland, there is a split profession. Nevertheless, subject to conditions, barristers can accept direct access work from clients. Each state Bar Association regulates the profession and essentially has the functions of the English Inns of Court. In the states of South Australia and Western Australia, as well as the Australian Capital Territory, the professions of barrister and solicitor are fused, but an independent bar nonetheless exists, regulated by the Legal Practice Board of the state or territory. In Tasmania and the Northern Territory, the profession is fused, although a very small number of practitioners operate as an independent bar.

Generally, counsel dress in the traditional English manner (wig, gown, bar jacket and jabot) before superior courts, although this is not usually done for interlocutory applications. Wigs and robes are still worn in the Supreme Court and the District Court in civil matters and are dependent on the judicial officer's attire. Robes and wigs are worn in all criminal cases. In Western Australia, wigs are no longer worn in any court.

Each year, the Bar Association appoints certain barristers of seniority and eminence to the rank of "Senior Counsel" (in most States and Territories) or "King's Counsel" (in the Northern Territory, Queensland, Victoria and South Australia). Such barristers carry the title "SC" or "KC" after their name. The appointments are made after a process of consultation with members of the profession and the judiciary. Senior Counsel appear in particularly complex or difficult cases. They make up about 14 per cent of the bar in New South Wales.

=== Bangladesh ===
In Bangladesh, the law relating to barristers is the Bangladesh Legal Practitioners and Bar Council Order as administered and enforced by the Bangladesh Bar Council. The Bar Council is the supreme statutory body that regulates the legal professions in Bangladesh and ensures educational standards and regulatory compliance of advocates. Newly enrolled advocates are permitted to start practice in the district courts after admission. After two years of practice, advocates may apply to practise in the High Court Division of the Supreme Court of Bangladesh by passing the Bar Council Examination. Only advocates who are barristers in the United Kingdom may use the title of barrister.

=== Canada ===
In Canada (except Quebec), the professions of barrister and solicitor are fused, and many lawyers refer to themselves with both names, even if they do not practise in both areas. In colloquial parlance within the Canadian legal profession, lawyers often term themselves as "litigators" (or "barristers"), or as "solicitors", depending on the nature of their law practice though some may in effect practise as both litigators and solicitors. However, "litigators" would generally perform all litigation functions traditionally performed by barristers and solicitors; in contrast, those terming themselves "solicitors" would generally limit themselves to legal work not involving practice before the courts (not even in a preparatory manner as performed by solicitors in England), though some might practise before chambers judges. As is the practice in many other Commonwealth jurisdictions such as Australia, Canadian litigators are gowned, but without a wig, when appearing before courts of superior jurisdiction. All law graduates from Canadian law schools, and certified internationally qualified lawyers, can apply to the relevant provincial law society for admission. A year of articling as a student supervised by a qualified lawyer and the passing of provincial bar exams are also required for an individual to be called to bar.

The situation is somewhat different in Quebec as a result of its civil law tradition. The profession of solicitor, or avoué, never took hold in colonial Quebec, so lawyers (avocats) have traditionally been a fused profession, arguing and preparing cases in contentious matters, whereas Quebec's other type of lawyer, civil-law notaries (notaires), handle out-of-court non-contentious matters. However, a number of areas of non-contentious private law are not monopolised by notaries so that lawyers / avocats often specialise in handling either trials, cases, advising, or non-trial matters. The only disadvantage is that lawyers / avocats cannot draw up public instruments that have the same force of law as notarial acts. Most large law firms in Quebec offer the full range of legal services of law firms in common-law provinces. Individuals who seek to become lawyers / avocats must earn a bachelor's degree in civil law, pass the provincial bar examination, and successfully complete legal articles stage to be admitted to practise. Lawyers are regulated by the Barreau du Québec, constituted under Quebec law.

=== France ===
In France, avocats, or attorneys, were, until the 20th century, the equivalent of barristers. The profession included several grades ranked by seniority: avocat-stagiaire (trainee, who was already qualified but needed to complete two years (or more, depending on the period) of training alongside seasoned lawyers), avocat, and avocat honoraire (emeritus barrister). Since the 14th century and during the course of the 19th and 20th in particular, French barristers competed in territorial battles over respective areas of legal practice against the conseil juridique (legal advisor, transactional solicitor) and avoué (procedural solicitor), and expanded to become the generalist legal practitioner, with the notable exception of notaires (notaries), who are ministry appointed lawyers (with a separate qualification) and who retain exclusivity over conveyancing and probate. After the 1971 and 1990 legal reforms, the avocat was fused with the avoué and the conseil juridique, making the avocat (or, if female, avocate) an all-purpose lawyer for matters of contentious jurisdiction, analogous to an American attorney. French attorneys usually do not (although they are entitled to) act both as litigators (trial lawyers) and legal consultants (advising lawyers), known respectively as avocat plaidant and avocat-conseil. This distinction is however purely informal and does not correspond to any difference in qualification or admission to the role. All intending attorneys must pass an examination to be able to enrol in one of the Centre régional de formation à la profession d'avocat (CRFPA) (Regional centre for the training of lawyers). The CRFPA course has a duration of two years and is a mix between classroom teachings and internships. Its culmination is the stage final (final training), where the intending attorney spends six months in a law firm (generally in their favoured field of practice and in a firm in which they hope to be recruited afterwards). The intending attorney then needs to pass the Certificat d'Aptitude à la Profession d'Avocat (CAPA), which is the last professional examination allowing them to join a court's bar (barreau). It is generally recognised that the first examination is much more difficult than the CAPA and is dreaded by most law students. Each bar is regulated by a Bar Council (Ordre du barreau).

A separate body of barristers exists called the avocats au Conseil d'Etat et à la Cour de Cassation. Although their legal background, training and status is the same as the all-purpose avocats, these have a monopoly over litigation taken to the supreme courts, in civil, criminal or administrative matters.

=== Germany ===
In Germany, no distinction between barristers and solicitors is made. Lawyers may plead at all courts except the civil branch of the Federal Court of Justice (Bundesgerichtshof), to which fewer than fifty lawyers are admitted. Those lawyers, who deal almost exclusively with litigation, may not plead at other courts and are usually instructed by a lawyer who represented the client in the lower courts. However, these restrictions do not apply to criminal cases, nor to pleadings at courts of the other court systems, including labour, administrative, taxation, and social courts and the European Union court system.

=== Hong Kong ===
The legal profession in Hong Kong is also divided into two branches: barristers and solicitors.

In the High Court of Hong Kong (including both the Court of First Instance and the Court of Appeal) and the Hong Kong Court of Final Appeal, as a general rule, only barristers and solicitor-advocates are allowed to speak on behalf of any party in open court. This means that solicitors are restricted from doing so. In these two courts, save for hearings in chambers, barristers dress in the traditional English manner, as do the judges and other lawyers.

In Hong Kong, the rank of King's Counsel was granted prior to the handover of Hong Kong from the United Kingdom to China in 1997. After the handover, the rank has been replaced by Senior Counsel post-nominal letters: SC. Senior Counsel may still, however, style themselves as silks, like their British counterparts.

=== India ===
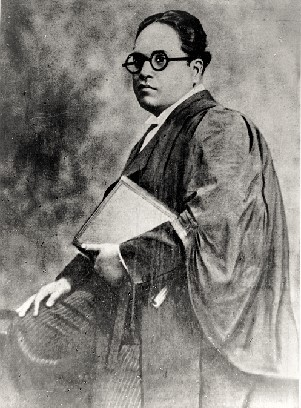
B. R. Ambedkar as barrister in 1923. Ambedkar was a notable Indian barrister, father of the Indian Constitution and the first Law Minister of India.

In India, the law relating to barristers is the Advocates Act, 1961, which is administered and enforced by the Bar Council of India. Under the act, the council is the supreme regulatory body for the legal profession in India, ensuring the compliance of the laws and maintenance of professional standards by the legal profession in the country. The council is authorised to pass regulations and make orders in individual cases.

Each state has a bar council whose function is to enrol barristers practising predominantly within that state. Each barrister must be enrolled with a single state bar council to practise in India. However, this does not restrict a barrister from appearing before any court in India.

For all practical and legal purposes, the Bar Council of India retains with it, the final power to take decisions in any and all matters related to the legal profession on the whole or with respect to any

There are two requirements to practise in India. First, the applicant must be a holder of a law degree from a recognised institution in India (or from one of the four recognised universities in the United Kingdom). Second, they must pass the enrolment qualifications of the bar council of the state they seek to be enrolled in. Through regulation, the Bar Council of India also ensures the standard of education required for practising in India is met with.

A barrister is required to maintain certain standards of conduct and professional demeanour at all times. The Bar Council of India prescribes rules of conduct to be observed by the Barristers in the courts, while interacting with clients and in non-professional settings.

=== Ireland ===
Frances Kyle, the first female Irish barrister

In the Republic of Ireland, admission to the Bar by the Chief Justice of Ireland is restricted to those on whom a Barrister-at-Law degree (BL) has first been conferred. The Honorable Society of King's Inns is the only educational establishment which runs vocational courses for barristers in the Republic and degrees of Barrister-at-Law can only be conferred by King's Inns. King's Inns are also the only body with the capacity to call individuals to the bar and to disbar them.

Most Irish barristers choose to be governed thereafter by the Bar of Ireland, a quasi-private entity. Senior members of the profession may be selected for elevation to the Inner Bar, when they may describe themselves as Senior Counsel ("SC"). All barristers who have not been called to the Inner Bar are known as Junior Counsel (and are identified by the postnominal initials "BL"), regardless of age or experience. Admission to the Inner Bar is made by declaration before the Supreme Court, patents of precedence having been granted by the Government. Irish barristers are sole practitioners and may not form chambers or partnerships if they wish to remain members of the Bar of Ireland's Law Library.

To practise under the Bar of Ireland's rules, a newly qualified barrister is apprenticed to an experienced barrister of at least seven years' experience. This apprenticeship is known as pupillage or devilling. Devilling is compulsory for those barristers who wish to be members of the Law Library and lasts for one legal year. It is common to devil for a second year in a less formal arrangement but this is not compulsory. Devils are not generally paid for their work in their devilling year.

=== Israel ===
In Israel, those certified to practise law hold the title of Advocate. The certification to practise law is unified, as there is no distinction between barristers and solicitors.

=== Japan ===
Japan adopts a unified system. However, there are certain classes of qualified professionals who are allowed to practise in certain limited areas of law, such as scriveners (shiho shoshi, qualified to handle title registration, deposit, and certain petite court proceedings with additional certification), tax accountants (zeirishi, qualified to prepare tax returns, provide advice on tax computation and represent a client in administrative tax appeals) and patent agents ("benrishi", qualified to practise patent registration and represent a client in administrative patent appeals). Only the lawyers (bengoshi) can appear before the court and are qualified to practise in any areas of law, including, but not limited to, areas that those qualified law-related professionals above are allowed to practise. Most attorneys still focus primarily on court practice and still a very small number of attorneys give sophisticated and expert legal advice on a day-to-day basis to large corporations.

=== Netherlands ===
The Netherlands used to have a semi-separated legal profession comprising the lawyer and the procureur, the latter resembling, to some extent, the profession of barrister. Under that system, lawyers were entitled to represent their clients in law, but were only able to file cases before the court at which they were registered. Cases falling under the jurisdiction of another court had to be filed by a procureur registered at that court, in practice often another lawyer exercising both functions. Questions were raised on the necessity of the separation, given the fact that its main purpose – the preservation of the quality of the legal profession and observance of local court rules and customs – had become obsolete. For that reason, the procureur as a separate profession was abolished and its functions merged with the legal profession in 2008. Currently, lawyers can file cases before any court, regardless of where they are registered. The only notable exception concerns civil cases brought before the Supreme Court, which have to be handled by lawyers registered at the Supreme Court, thus gaining from it the title "lawyer at the Supreme Court".

=== New Zealand ===
In New Zealand, the professions are not formally fused but practitioners are enrolled in the High Court as "Barristers and Solicitors". They may choose, however, to practise as barristers sole. About 15% practice solely as barristers, mainly in the larger cities and usually in "chambers" (following the British terminology). They receive "instructions" from other practitioners, at least nominally. They usually conduct the proceedings in their entirety.

Any lawyer may apply to become a King's Counsel (KC) to recognise the long-standing contribution to the legal profession but this status is only conferred on those practising as solicitors in exceptional circumstances. This step referred to as "being called to the inner bar" or "taking silk", is considered highly prestigious and has been a step in the career of many New Zealand judges.

Unlike other jurisdictions, the term "junior barrister" is popularly used to refer to a lawyer who holds a practising certificate as a barrister, but is employed by another, more senior barrister. Generally, junior barristers are within their first five years of practice and are not yet qualified to practise as barristers sole. Barristers sole (i.e. barristers who are not employed by another barrister) who are not King's Counsel are never referred to as junior barristers.

=== Nigeria ===
In Nigeria, there is no formal distinction between barristers and solicitors. All students who pass the bar examinations – offered exclusively by the Nigerian Law School – are called to the Nigerian bar, by the Body of Benchers. Lawyers may argue in any Federal trial or appellate court as well as any of the courts in Nigeria's 36 states and the Federal Capital Territory. The Legal Practitioner's Act refers to Nigerian lawyers as Legal Practitioners, and following their call to the Bar, Nigerian lawyers enter their names in the register or Roll of Legal Practitioners kept at the Supreme Court. For this reason, a Nigerian lawyer is often referred to as a Barrister and Solicitor of the Supreme Court of Nigeria, and many Nigerian lawyers term themselves Barrister-at-Law with the postnominal initials "B.L".

The vast majority of Nigerian lawyers combine contentious and non-contentious work, although there is a growing tendency for practitioners in the bigger practices to specialise in one or the other. In colloquial parlance within the Nigerian legal profession, lawyers may, therefore, be referred to as "litigators" or as "solicitors".

Consistent with the practice in England and elsewhere in the Commonwealth, senior members of the profession may be selected for elevation to the Inner Bar by the conferment of the rank of Senior Advocate of Nigeria (SAN).

=== Pakistan ===
The profession in Pakistan is fused; an advocate works both as a barrister and a solicitor, with higher rights of audience being provided. To practise as a barrister in Pakistan, a law graduate must complete three steps; pass the Bar Practical and the Training Course (BPTC), and be called to the Provincial Bar Council, and obtain a licence to practise as an advocate in the courts of Pakistan from the relevant Bar Council, either on provincial or federal level.

=== Poland ===
In Poland, there are two main types of legal professions: advocate and legal counsel. Both are regulated and these professions are restricted only for people who graduated five-year law studies, have at least three years of experience and passed five difficult national exams (civil law, criminal law, company law, administrative law and ethic) or have a doctor of law degree. Before 2015, the only difference was that advocates have a right to represent clients before the court in all cases and the legal advisors could not represent clients before the court in criminal cases. Presently, legal advisors can also represent clients in criminal cases, making the historical differences between these professions largely obsolete.

=== South Africa ===
In South Africa the employment and practice of advocates (as barristers are known in South Africa) is consistent with the rest of the Commonwealth. Advocates carry the rank of Junior or Senior Counsel (SC), and are mostly briefed and paid by solicitors (known as attorneys). They are usually employed in the higher courts, particularly in the Appeal Courts where they often appear as specialist counsel. South African solicitors (attorneys) follow a practice of referring cases to Counsel for an opinion before proceeding with a case, when Counsel in question practices as a specialist in the case law at stake. Aspiring advocates currently spend one year in pupillage (formerly only six months) before being admitted to the bar in their respective provincial or judicial jurisdictions. The term "Advocate" is sometimes used in South Africa as a title, e. g. "Advocate John Doe, SC" (Advokaat in Afrikaans) in the same fashion as "Dr. John Doe" for a medical doctor.

=== South Korea ===
In South Korea, there was no distinction between the judiciary and lawyers. Previously, a person who passed the national bar exam after two years of national education could become a judge, prosecutor, or "lawyer" based on their grades upon graduation. Due to changes brought by the implementation of an accommodated law school system, there are now two standard pathways to becoming a lawyer. Under the current legal system, lawyers who wish to become judges or prosecutors must first gain practical experience in legal practice. There is no specific limitation on what areas of law a "lawyer" may practice.

=== Spain ===
Spain has a division but it does not correspond to the division in Britain between barristers/advocates and solicitors. Procuradores represent the litigant procedurally in court, generally under the authority of a power of attorney executed by a civil law notary, while abogados represent the substantive claims of the litigant through trial advocacy. Abogados perform both transactional work and advise in connection with court proceedings, and they have full right of audience in front of the court. The court proceeding is carried out with abogados, not with procuradores. In essence, procuradores act as court agents operating under the instructions of an abogado. Their practice is confined to the locality of the court to which they are admitted.

=== United Kingdom ===
Under European Union law, barristers, along with advocates, chartered legal executives and solicitors, are recognised as lawyers.

==== England and Wales ====
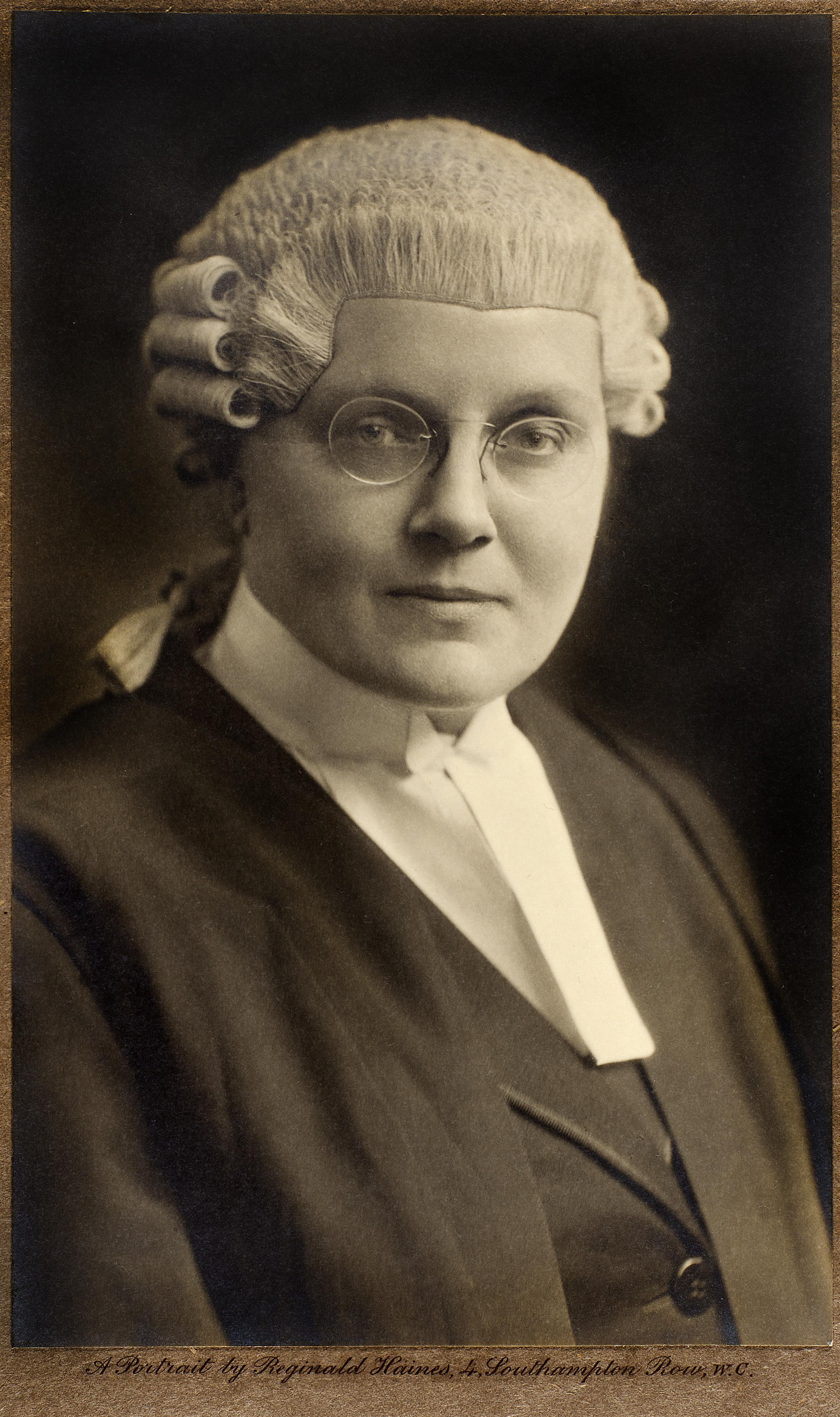
Helena Normanton, one of the first female British barristers

Although with somewhat different laws, England and Wales are considered within the United Kingdom a single united and unified legal jurisdiction for the purposes of both civil and criminal law, alongside Scotland and Northern Ireland, the other two legal jurisdictions within the United Kingdom. England and Wales are covered by a common bar and a single law society.

The profession of barrister in England and Wales is a separate profession from that of solicitor. It is, however, possible to hold the qualification of both barrister and solicitor, and/or chartered legal executive at the same time. It is not necessary to leave the bar to qualify as a solicitor.

Barristers are regulated by the Bar Standards Board, a division of the General Council of the Bar. A barrister must be a member of one of the Inns of Court, which traditionally educated and regulated barristers. There are four Inns of Court: The Honourable Society of Lincoln's Inn, The Honourable Society of Gray's Inn, The Honourable Society of the Middle Temple and The Honourable Society of the Inner Temple. All are located in Central London, near the Royal Courts of Justice. They perform both scholastic and social roles, and in all cases, provide financial aid to student barristers (subject to merit) through scholarships. It is the Inns that call students to the Bar at a ceremony akin to a graduation. Social functions include dining with other members and guests and hosting other events.

Law graduates wishing to work and be known as barristers must undertake the vocational component of Bar Training, the Bar Course at one of the 10 institutions approved by the Bar Standards Board. On successful completion of the Bar Course, students are Called to the Bar by their Inns of Court. Before completing pupillage, students who have been Called are known as unregistered barristers. Those wishing to practice as barristers must undertake 12 months of pupillage. The first six months (the "non-practising period") are spent shadowing more senior practitioners, after which pupil barristers may begin to undertake some court work of their own (the "practising period"). Following successful completion of this stage, most barristers then join a set of Chambers, a group of counsel who share the costs of premises and support staff whilst remaining individually self-employed.

There are approximately 17,000 barristers, of whom about ten per cent are King's Counsel and about 4,000 are "young barristers" (i.e., under seven years' Call). In April 2023 there were 13,800 barristers in self-employed practice. In 2022 there were about 3,100 employed barristers working as in-house counsel in companies, local or national government, academic institutions, charities, or in the armed forces.

Certain barristers in England and Wales are now instructed directly by members of the public. Members of the public may engage the services of the barrister directly within the framework of the Public Access Scheme; a solicitor is not involved at any stage. Barristers undertaking public access work can provide legal advice and representation in court in almost all areas of law and are entitled to represent clients in any court or tribunal in England and Wales. Once instructions from a client are accepted, it is the barrister who advises and guides the client through the relevant legal procedure or litigation.

Before a barrister can undertake Public Access work, they must have completed a special course. At present, about one in 20 barristers has so qualified. There is also a separate scheme called "Licensed Access", available to certain nominated classes of professional client. It is not open to the general public. Public access work is experiencing a huge surge at the bar, with barristers taking advantage of the new opportunity for the bar to make profit in the face of legal aid cuts elsewhere in the profession.

The ability of barristers to accept such instructions is a recent development; it results from a change in the rules set down by the General Council of the Bar in July 2004. The Public Access Scheme has been introduced as part of the drive to open up the legal system to the public and to make it easier and cheaper to obtain access to legal advice. It further reduces the distinction between solicitors and barristers. The distinction remains however because there are certain aspects of a solicitor's role that a barrister is not able to undertake.

Historically a barrister might use the honorific, Esquire. Even though the term barrister-at-law is sometimes seen, and was once very common, it has never been formally correct in England and Wales. Barrister is the only correct nomenclature.

Barristers are expected to maintain very high standards of professional conduct. The objective of the barristers code of conduct is to avoid dominance by either the barrister or the client and the client being enabled to make informed decisions in a supportive atmosphere and, in turn, the client expects (implicitly and/or explicitly) the barrister to uphold their duties, namely by acting in the client's best interests (CD2), acting with honesty and integrity (CD3), keeping the client's affairs confidential (CD6) and working to a competent standard (CD7). These core duties (CDs) are a few, among others, that are enshrined in the BSB Handbook.

==== Northern Ireland ====
In April 2003 there were 554 barristers in independent practice in Northern Ireland. 66 were King's Counsel (KCs), barristers who have earned a high reputation and are appointed by the King on the recommendation of the Lord Chancellor as senior advocates and advisers.

Those barristers who are not KCs are called Junior Counsel and are styled "BL" or "Barrister-at-Law". The term junior is often misleading since many members of the Junior Bar are experienced barristers with considerable expertise.

Benchers are, and have been for centuries, the governing bodies of the four Inns of Court in London and King's Inns, Dublin. The Benchers of the Inn of Court of Northern Ireland governed the Inn until the enactment of the Constitution of the Inn in 1983, which provides that the government of the Inn is shared between the Benchers, the Executive Council of the Inn and members of the Inn assembled in General Meeting.

The Executive Council (through its Education Committee) is responsible for considering Memorials submitted by applicants for admission as students of the Inn and by Bar students of the Inn for admission to the degree of Barrister-at-Law and making recommendations to the Benchers. The final decisions on these Memorials are taken by the Benchers. The Benchers also have the exclusive power of expelling or suspending a Bar student and of disbarring a barrister or suspending a barrister from practice.

The Executive Council is also involved with: education; fees of students; calling counsel to the Bar, although call to the Bar is performed by the Lord Chief Justice of Northern Ireland on the invitation of the Benchers; administration of the Bar Library (to which all practising members of the Bar belong); and liaising with corresponding bodies in other countries.

==== Scotland ====
In Scotland an advocate is, in all respects except name, a barrister, but there are significant differences in professional practice. Admission to and the conduct of the profession is regulated by the Faculty of Advocates (as opposed to an Inn).

==== Crown dependencies and UK Overseas Territories ====
===== Isle of Man, Jersey and Guernsey =====
In the Bailiwick of Jersey, there are solicitors (called ecrivains) and advocates (French avocat). In the Bailiwicks of Jersey and Guernsey and on the Isle of Man, advocates perform the combined functions of both solicitors and barristers.

===== Gibraltar =====
Gibraltar is a British Overseas Territory boasting a legal profession based on the common law. The legal profession includes both barristers and solicitors with most barristers also acting as solicitors. Admission and disciplinary matters in Gibraltar are dealt with by the Bar Council of Gibraltar and the Supreme Court of Gibraltar. For barristers or solicitors to be admitted as practising lawyers in Gibraltar they must comply with the Supreme Court Act 1930 as amended by the Supreme Court Amendment Act 2015 which requires, amongst other things, for all newly admitted lawyers as of 1 July 2015 to undertake a year's course in Gibraltar law at the University of Gibraltar. Solicitors also have right of audience in Gibraltar's courts.

=== United States ===
The United States does not distinguish between lawyers as barristers and solicitors. Any American lawyer who has passed a bar examination and has been admitted to practise law in a particular US jurisdiction may prosecute or defend. The barrister–solicitor distinction existed historically in some US states, which had a separate label for barristers (called "counselors", hence the expression "attorney and counselor at law"). Both professions have long since been fused.

Additionally, some state appellate courts require attorneys to obtain a separate certificate of admission to plead and practice in the appellate court. Federal courts require specific admission to that court's bar to practise before it. At the state appellate level and in federal courts, there is generally no separate examination process, although some US district courts require an examination on practices and procedures in their specific courts. Unless an examination is required, admission is usually granted as a matter of course to any licensed attorney in the state where the court is located. Some federal courts will grant admission to any attorney licensed in any US jurisdiction.

== Popular culture ==
- Rumpole of the Bailey (UK) – classic courtroom series
- Kavanagh QC (1995–2001) (UK)
- North Square (2000) (UK) – Channel 4 court drama series contains interactions between barristers and solicitors
- Bridget Jones's Diary (1996 book and 2001 film) – A major character, Mark Darcy, is described as a "top barrister"
- A Fish Called Wanda (1988) – John Cleese's character, Archie Leach, is a barrister who, in defending a hapless jewel thief, becomes entangled in the crime
- Silk (2011–2014) (UK) – BBC court drama series
- Rake (2010–2016) – Australian TV series based on the story of a colourful barrister
- Sydney Carton – central character, a barrister, in Charles Dickens' A Tale of Two Cities
- Witness for the Prosecution, in which the central character is the barrister Sir Wilfred Robards, QC
- Arnold Timsh – Target in The Knife of Dunwall, an expansion on the video game Dishonored
- Barrister Babu (2020) – Indian social drama TV series on Colors TV
- The Munchkin Barrister (1987) – A character with a featured role in the Wizard of Oz Musical (RSC)

== See also ==
- Bar (law)
- Barristers' Ball
- Legal professions in England and Wales
- Revising barrister
- Serjeant-at-law
- Special pleader
