= Leader Development and Assessment Course =

US Army's Reserve Officers' training

ROTC cadets board a CH-47 Chinook at Ft. Lewis

The Leadership Development and Assessment Course is the centerpiece of the US Army's Reserve Officers' Training Corps (ROTC) program. Since the 1950s, the Army has called it "Advanced Camp"; it is currently known as "Warrior Forge". It is conducted during June, July, and August at Fort Knox, Kentucky. The course is normally attended by cadets between their junior and senior years of college, although the last rotation consists of soldiers in the Officer Candidate School as well as military junior colleges.

== Training ==
The course totals 29 consecutive days of training and testing in common soldier skills.

- Days 1–4 are dedicated to in-processing paperwork and getting to know one's squad and platoon.
- Days 5–11 focus on the individual training tasks such as the Army Physical Fitness Test test, day and night land navigation, grenade assault course, rappelling, radio procedures, US weapons, Chemical Biological Radiological Nuclear and Explosives (CBRNE), cultural awareness, field craft, and tactics.
- Days 12–13 are geared toward team and squad training with Field Leadership and Reaction Course and first aid.
- Day 14 is dedicated to soldier and equipment preparation for the upcoming "deployment."
- Days 15–22 see cadets deployed to conduct four days of Squad Situational Training Exercises and two days of patrolling. These activities consist of two full squads conducting three missions per day.
- Day 23 begins with a 10-mile victory march back to the barracks where cadets clean and turn in their M16 rifle or M4 Carbine, clean their equipment, and recover.
- Days 24–29 are final assessments, including a water confidence course, retesting for physical fitness test and a land navigation test that will take place back at home school, and graduation.

Typically, the training is a refresher of what the cadets learned at their individual schools, and is meant to act as a leveler for cadets' different backgrounds. The main goal is to assess and evaluate the tactical and garrison knowledge learned during the first three years in ROTC. Formal training is conducted by the active duty officers and non-commissioned officers, but day-to-day activities are run by the cadets, who rotate through leadership positions. Cadets are encouraged to hold formations as necessary, march the formations, perform inspections, and conduct extra training to better prepare cadets for upcoming events.

=== Simulated deployment ===
All the training before day 15 is to prepare for a simulated deployment to a fictional nation that changes each year. The 2010 regiments were deployed to Atropia, said to be located in the Caucasus, where the inhabitants speak Spanish but have culture and customs similar those of Iraq and Afghanistan. In Atropia, the cadets' mission was to conduct peacekeeping missions while fighting an insurgency. The deployment is an eight-day field training exercise during which the cadets run six combat missions each day, then link up with a predetermined squad to conduct patrolling operations. Missions can include attacks, ambushes, reconnaissance, react to contact, and knock out a bunker. Variable training lanes can address dealing with media on the battlefield, enemy surrender, indirect contact. Cadets will have only the clothes and equipment that they are able carry, and they will receive a resupply of water and meals ready-to-eat each day.

== Evaluation ==
The Leadership Development and Assessment Course revolves around evaluations, which cadets receive in various leadership positions. They receive a minimum of four evaluations: two in garrison (one at a squad level and one at platoon or company level), one as squad leaders during squad tactical exercises, and accumulated evaluation on patrolling exercises. A grade of E (Exceeds the Standard), S (Satisfies the Standard), or N (Needs Improvement) is given for 17 "Dimensions of Leadership", making up an overall grade for the position. At the end of the course, cadets receive an overall grade of E, S, or N for their entire 29 days. This final grade is determined primarily by their leadership evaluations, but also by two peer evaluations, physical fitness score, land navigation score, and a TAC (Teacher, Assessor, Coach) evaluation. Cadets who received at least 2/4 E's overall, as well as 9/17 dimensional E's, receives an overall E for camp.

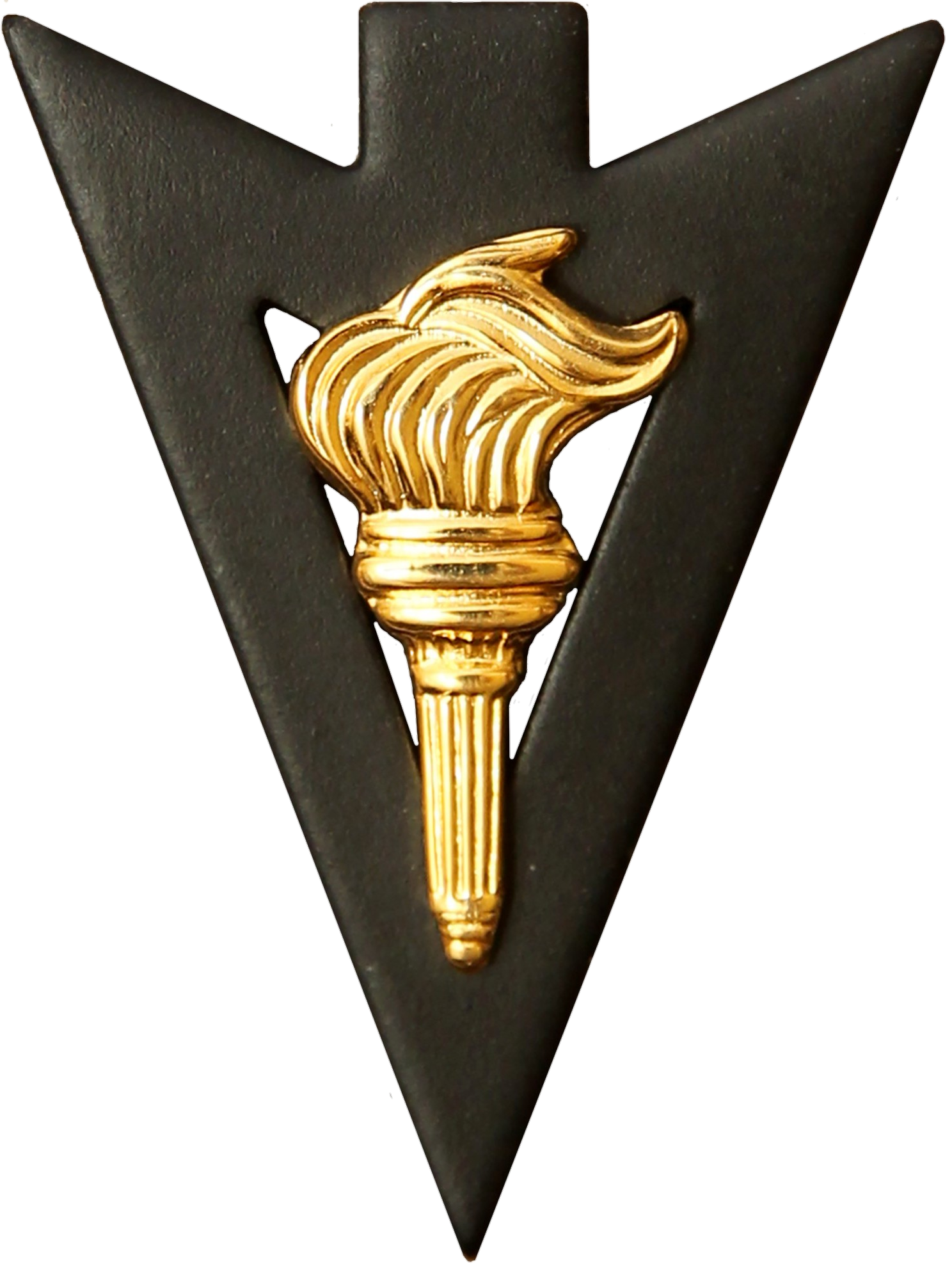
AROTC Recondo Badge, awarded to cadets that achieve the "Recondo" requirements

Approximately 8% of cadets receive an overall E, while 73% received an S, and 17% receives an N. Cadets receive additional credit for being one of the top five cadets in their platoon and for meeting "Recondo" requirements. To earn Recondo, cadets must:

- Execute all confidence training presented to the prescribed standard, to include water safety tasks.
- Have no non-medical waivers on any event throughout the course.
- Score 270 or above on the Army Physical Fitness Test, without retest, with a minimum of 90 points per event.
- Achieve a score of 80 percent on practical Land Navigation proficiency tests without retest.
- Complete the following First Aid tasks to specified standards: CPR, evaluate a casualty, manage the airway, and control bleeding.
- Pass both Squad STX lane evaluations with a minimum rating of satisfactory or higher.
- Successfully complete Warrior Forge without a performance waiver. Medical waivers are acceptable.
- Receive satisfactory or higher summary ratings for all 16 scored leadership dimensions and values, as reported on the Cadet Command Form 67-9, Cadet Evaluation Report.
- Meet height/weight or body fat standards IAW AR 600-9.

The additional credit cadets receive at the leadership course goes into their accessions packet, which is used to determine their National Order of Merit List ranking. Cadets list their preferences for their assigned Army branches and duty stations; upon graduation, the Order of Merit List (OML) ranking is the criterion by which those assignments are made, with the most sought-after assignments going to the highest-ranked cadets.
