= Frances Kyle =

Irish barrister (1893–1958)

- Kyle as pictured in The Vote, 1922
- Born: 30 October 1893; Belfast
- Died: 22 June 1958, aged 64; The London Clinic, Marylebone
- Education: Trinity College Dublin
- Occupation: Barrister
- Known for: One of the first two women to be admitted to the bar in either Ireland or Great Britain

Frances Christian Kyle, LLB (30 October 1893 – 22 June 1958) was a Northern Irish barrister and the first woman, together with Averil Deverell, to be admitted to the bar in either Ireland or Great Britain, being called to the Bar of Ireland on 1 November 1921. It not only made headlines in Dublin but also New York City, London, and India. It was almost a year before any woman was called to the English bar (Ivy Williams, 10 May 1922).

== Early life ==
Kyle was born on 30 October 1893 in Belfast in Ulster, the northern province in Ireland. She was the youngest child of Robert Alexander Kyle, an outfitter/draper, and Kathleen Frances Bates. A governess, Delphine Ladiray, educated Frances and her sister Kathleen, who subsequently attended Ladies' & Preparatory School. She spent a year in 1905 at a boarding school in Poitiers in France and then attended a finishing school in Bern in Switzerland. She received her BA in French in 1914, and her LLB in 1916 at Trinity College, Dublin (TCD).

== Career ==
In January 1920, Frances Kyle and Averil Deverell were admitted as the first female students of law at the King's Inns in Dublin. Kyle came first in the Bar Entrance Examinations and, in October 1921, she became the first woman to win the John Brooke Scholarship. At the time, The Irish Times described her being awarded the Scholarship as representing "a women's invasion of the law."

On 1 November 1921, she was called to the Irish bar by Sir Thomas Molony. A week later, she was called to the newly established Bar of Northern Ireland at the Crumlin Road Courthouse. She practiced as a probationer and received her first brief on 23 November 1922. On 14 November 1922, Kyle was elected a member of the Circuit of Northern Ireland at a meeting in Belfast, becoming the first female member of a circuit. Kyle is reported in the Dublin Evening Telegraph in 1922 as having received eight briefs.

Kyle may have struggled to find work as her last listing in Thom's Law Directory is in 1931. In 1937, she appeared in court to defend herself on a parking summons. By 1952, Kyle was living in London with her sister Kathleen, who was married to a medical inspector, Dr. John McCloy. In 1930, Kathleen was described by the Belfast Newsletter as "very well known in Belfast" and "a delightful speaker".

Kyle died of cancer at The London Clinic in Marylebone on 22 June 1958, aged 64.
