= Bar of Northern Ireland =

Northern Irish professional association

The Bar of Northern Ireland
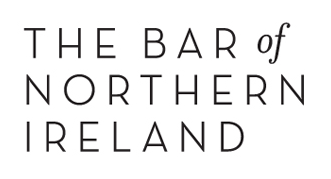

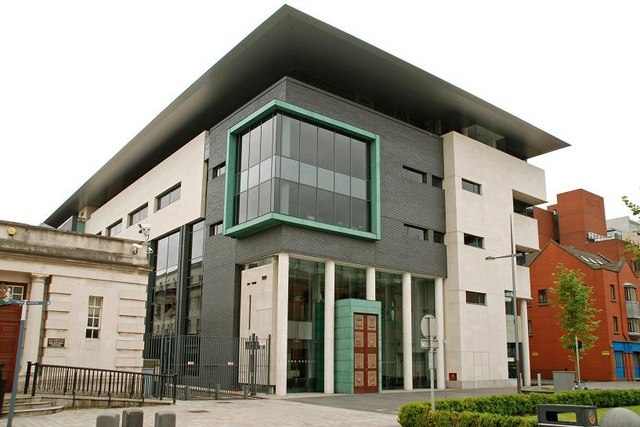
- The Bar Library, Belfast
- Predecessor: Bar of Ireland
- Formation: 1926
- Type: Bar association
- Purpose: Educational, representative and regulatory
- Professional title: Barrister
- Headquarters: The Bar Library, 91 Chichester Street
- Location: Belfast, Northern Ireland
- Region served: Northern Ireland
- Members: Over 600 (2026)
- Chair: Donal Lunny
- Funding: Professional and educational fees
- Website: www.barofni.com

The Bar of Northern Ireland is the professional association of barristers for Northern Ireland, with over 600 members. It is based in the Bar Library, beside the Royal Courts of Justice in Belfast, together with the Bar Council of Northern Ireland (the professional body of the members of the Northern Irish Bar) and the Executive Council. The Executive Council has taken on many of the functions formerly exercised by the Benchers of the Inn of Court of Northern Ireland, which was established at a meeting of the Bench and Bar held on 11 January 1926.

== Relationship with the Bar of Ireland ==
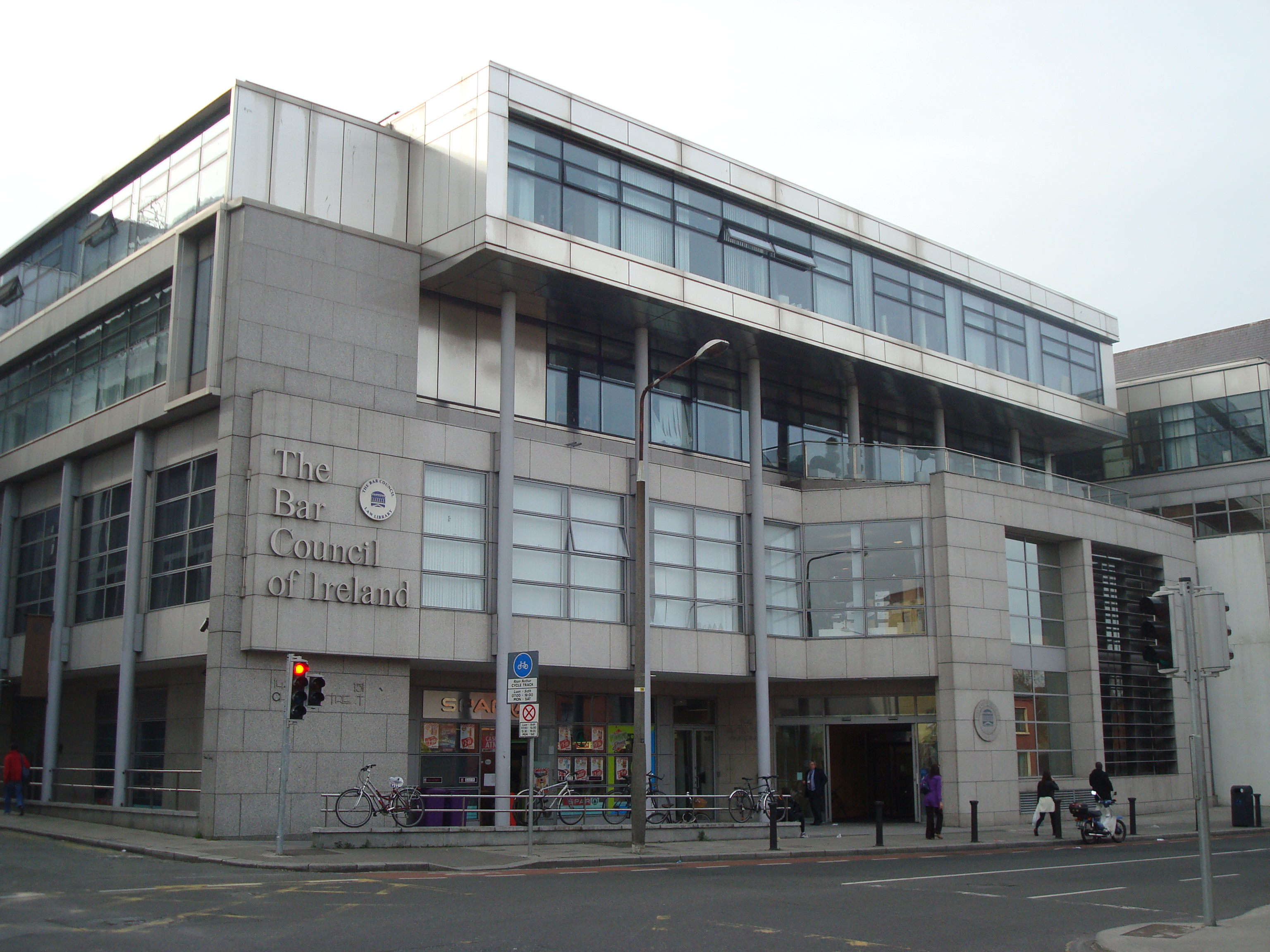
The Bar of Ireland Headquarters, Dublin

Before the partition of Ireland, barristers throughout the island of Ireland were trained at the King's Inns and were members of the Bar of Ireland. The Government of Ireland Act 1920 split Ireland into two legal jurisdictions, and after 1922, Northern Ireland became a separate legal system. The King's Inns initially hoped partition would not end its all-island remit, and it set up a "Committee of Fifteen" Northern Ireland benchers in 1922. However, this committee sought more independence, and from 11 January 1926, the Inn of Court of Northern Ireland and the Bar Council of Northern Ireland were created.

The Bar of Northern Ireland collaborates with the Bar of Ireland on various initiatives, including the Irish Rule of Law International. The two associations jointly hosted the World Bar Conference in 2024.

Practising members of the Bar of Northern Ireland are eligible to join the Bar of Ireland without taking any further exams. Practising members of the Bar of Ireland have a reciprocal eligibility.

== Development of the Bar of Northern Ireland ==
The profession of barrister has been in existence in Ireland since the arrival of the common law system in the 12th century, and co-existed with the profession of aigne until the abolition of the native Brehon law system in approximately the 17th century.

In 1541, the Honorable Society of King's Inns was established on what is now the site of the Four Courts. This meant that Irish barristers could now train within Ireland, albeit with an obligation to keep terms in one of the Inns of Court in London. This requirement was costly to Irish barristers and was a contentious issue until it was abolished by the Barristers’ Admission (Ireland) Act, 1885.

The regulation of barristers in Ireland increased during the 18th century. The Benchers of the Honorable Society of King's Inns was the profession's de facto governing body. Originally, the Benchers consisted of the Lord Chancellor, the judges of the superior courts, some senior officers of the superior courts and all the senior members of the Bar, including the Attorney-General, the Solicitor General and the three Serjeants. The Benchers had the power to censure or disbar barristers.

At a meeting of the Irish Bar in February 1816, the Law Library Society was established for the purposes of providing a subscription-based lending library of legal texts to practising barristers. This led to the development of the Law Library as a distinctive feature of the Irish Bar whereby members of the Bar practised not from chambers but from a common library to which they subscribed.

The General Council of the Bar of Ireland was established following a meeting of the Irish Bar in 1897.

Following the Partition of Ireland in 1921, all existing members of the Bar of Ireland became members of both the Bar of Ireland and the Bar of Northern Ireland, with all members having a right of audience in the courts of both jurisdictions. The Bar of Ireland agreed to provide the Bar of Northern Ireland with copies of law reports in order to assist it in establishing a library.

From 11 January 1926, the Inn of Court of Northern Ireland and the Bar Council of Northern Ireland were created.

The present constitution was adopted on 5 October 1983, and also governs the Bar of Northern Ireland and the Bar Council.

For many years the Inn of Court of Northern Ireland was a rather theoretical body, lacking as it did the physical premises for social and professional interaction provided by the comparable Inns of Court in London or the King's Inns in Dublin. The redevelopment of the Bar Library, officially opened by Her Excellency Professor Mary McAleese, The President of Ireland, on 29 April 2005, to provide not only enhanced library facilities but also suitable rooms for Continuing Professional Development, meetings, dining and receptions, has afforded the Inn the means of providing the Northern Irish Bar with the reality of association it had hitherto been lacking.

== Barristers' chambers ==
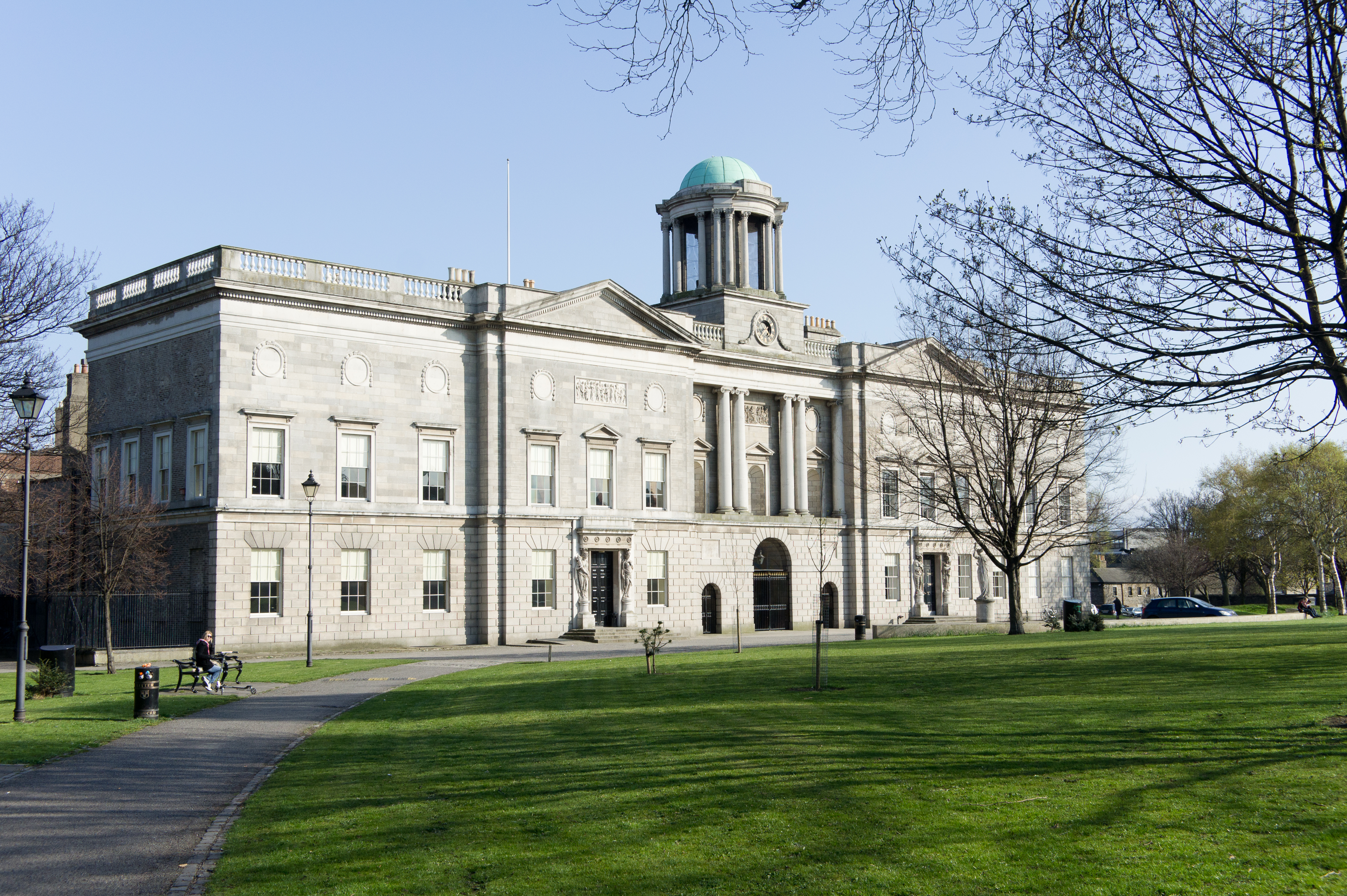
The King's Inns

Unlike some other jurisdictions, there is no system of barristers' chambers in either jurisdiction in Ireland. Rather, most barristers in Northern Ireland practice from the common Bar Library and most in the Republic of Ireland practice from the common Law Library; in each case, barristers pay a subscription to be members.

Until 1885, all intending Irish barristers were obliged to "keep terms" in one of the English Inns of Court before being called to the Bar of Ireland and being entitled to practise as barristers in Ireland. Following on from these close historical links to the English Bar, for much of the nineteenth century it appeared that a system of barristers' chambers would develop in Ireland.

Initially, the benchers of the King's Inns (which trained barristers in Ireland) made plans to build chambers for Irish barristers, in the vicinity of Dublin's Henrietta Street. From about 1793, the benchers went so far as to decide to have chambers built, funded both by the King's Inns and by barristers who would lease building land from the benchers for their own chambers. Deposits were levied annually from new barristers and solicitors, and rules were even agreed by the benchers for the regulation of tenancies by Irish barristers in chambers. However, despite this levying of the profession, following practical objections raised by the architect James Gandon concerning the difficulty of building the main King's Inns building at the same time as private chambers, the barristers' chambers were never built. To this day, no system of barristers' chambers has ever been developed in Northern Ireland or the Republic of Ireland.

== Notable barristers ==
- Frances "Fay" Kyle was the first woman barrister in either Ireland or Great Britain. She was born in Belfast in 1893. She was called to the Bar of Ireland on 1 November 1921. She had graduated from Trinity College Dublin with a BA in French in 1914 and an LLB in 1916. She had commenced her studies at the King's Inns in Dublin in January 1920. From 1922, she practiced on the Northern Ireland Circuit.
- Denis Henry was called to the Bar of Ireland in 1885 and became the first Lord Chief Justice of Northern Ireland following the partition of Ireland in 1921.
- Mary McAleese was born in Belfast and was called to the Bar of Northern Ireland in 1974 and practised in Belfast. She went on to be elected President of Ireland and served from 1997 to 2011.
- Donal O'Donnell was born in Belfast and was called to the Bar of Northern Ireland in 1989. He was also called to the Bar of Ireland in 1982. He was appointed as a judge of the Supreme Court of Ireland in 2010 and was appointed as Chief Justice of Ireland in 2021.
- Edward Carson, the famous orator and politician, began his career as a barrister when he was called to the Bar of Ireland in 1877.

Frances Kyle, the first woman barrister in Ireland

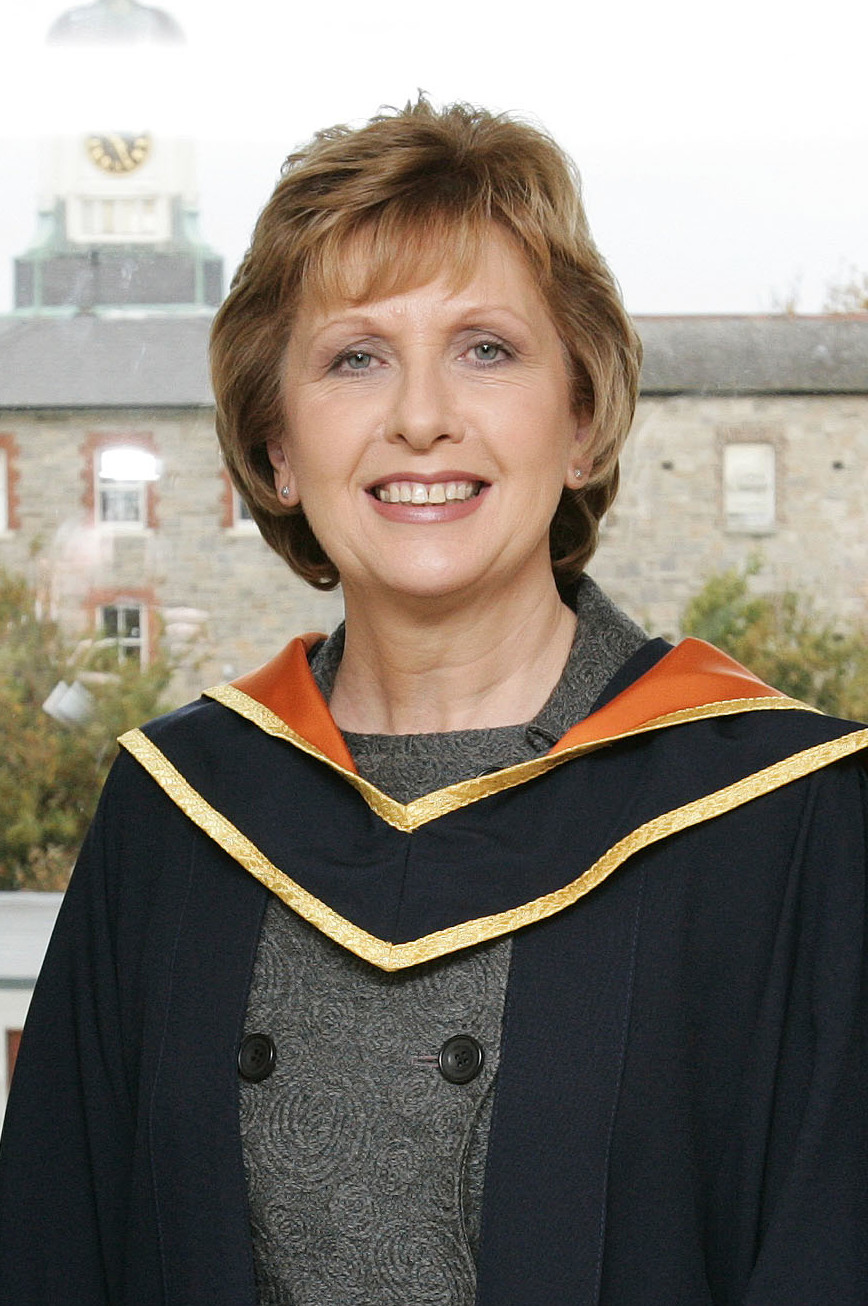
Mary McAleese, barrister and former President of Ireland

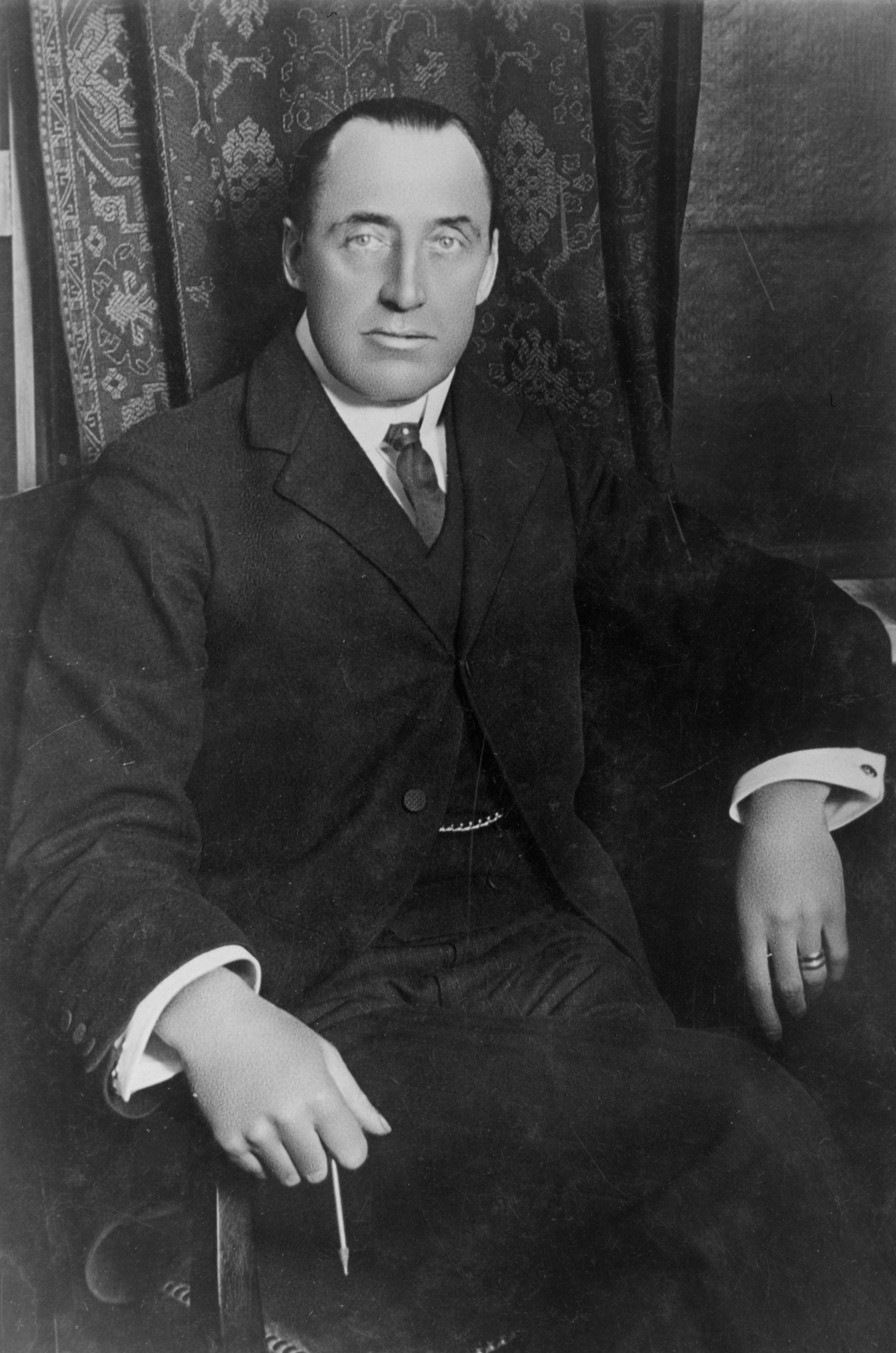
Edward Carson, barrister and Irish unionist politician

== Distinction between senior counsel and king's counsel ==
Senior counsel and king's counsel are effectively the same, in that they are honours given to certain barristers who are called to the Inner Bar in recognition of their experience and expertise. The distinction is that some jurisdictions (the UK and some Commonwealth countries) use the king's counsel title, whereas others use the senior counsel title.

Barristers who are called to the Inner Bar in Northern Ireland are called king's counsel. This is problematic for some barristers who object to the monarcy and/or to the partition of Ireland and the consequent position of the British monarch as head of state for Northern Ireland. In 2003, a workaround was found by Philip Magee, a barrister who practiced in both the Republic of Ireland and Northern Ireland. He was called to the Inner Bar in the Republic of Ireland as senior counsel, having received confirmation from the Lord Chief Justice of Northern Ireland that he would thereafter enjoy the same rights and privileges as a king's counsel in Northern Ireland. A number of senior counsel now practice in Northern Ireland on foot of this procedure. However, this option is only available to Northern Irish barristers who have also been called to the Bar of Ireland and have the requisite experience and meet the criteria for being called to the Inner Bar in the Republic of Ireland.

Barristers in Northern Ireland were formerly required to swear an oath to serve the British monarch upon being called to the Inner Bar. This was problematic for barristers who objected to the monarchy and/or to the partition of Ireland. The Bar of Northern Ireland voted in 1997 to seek the removal of that requirement, noting that it was "not aware of any other profession which requires of its individual practitioners, either on admission or on advancement, to make a promise expressly to serve the interests of the Crown as opposed to the interests of potential clients in general", and that the removal of that requirement would form part of the modernisation of the profession. In 2000, the requirement to swear an oath to serve the monarch was replaced with an oath to "well and truly serve all whom I may lawfully be called upon to serve in the office of one of Her/His Majesty's Counsel".

== See also ==
- Law Society of Northern Ireland, the professional association for solicitors in Northern Ireland
- Bar of Ireland, the predecessor of the Bar of Northern Ireland and still the professional association for barristers in the Republic of Ireland

== Sources ==
- Bar Library, Belfast
