= Taxi stand =

Queue area and pick-up point for taxis

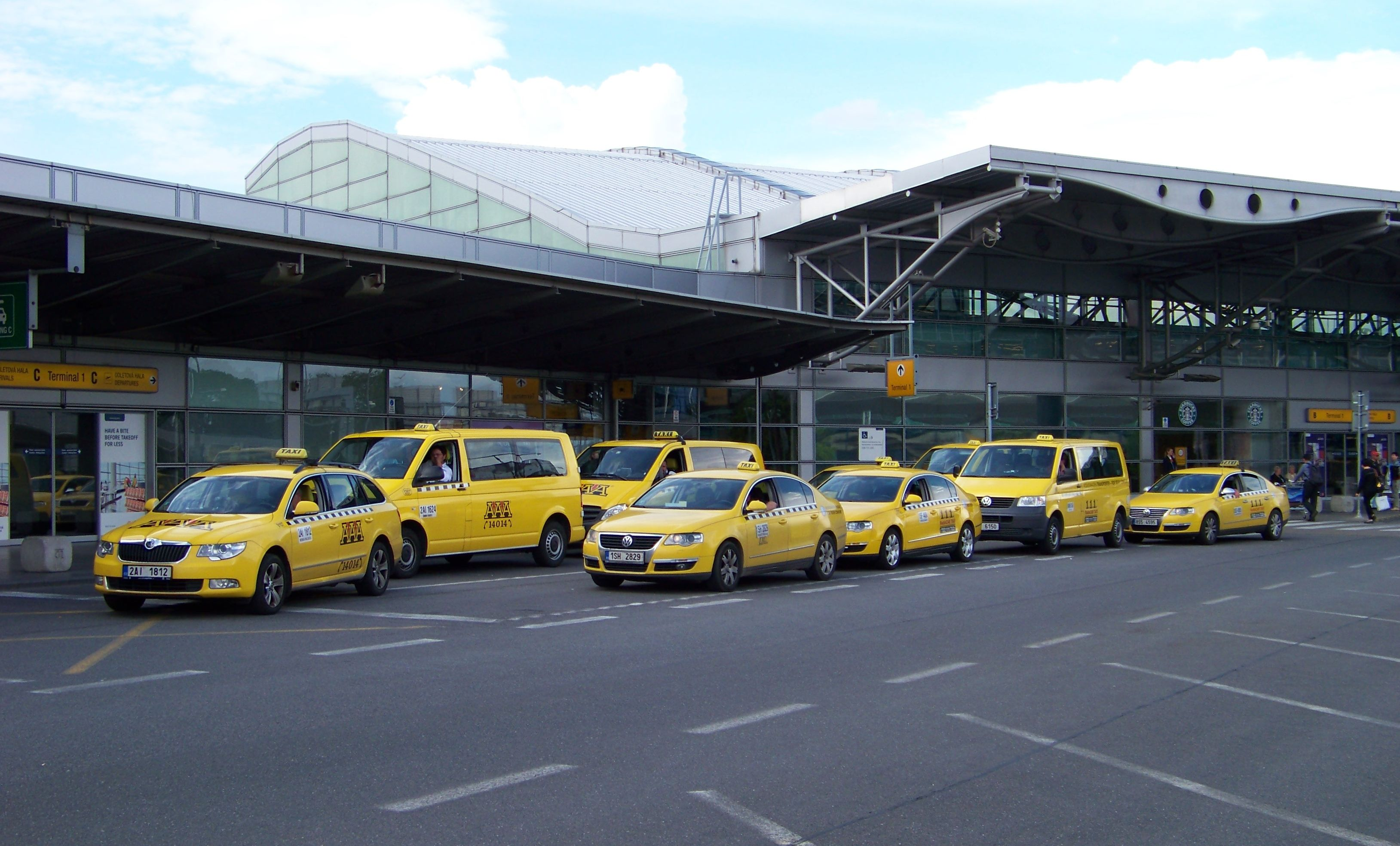
Taxi stand at Václav Havel Airport, Prague, Czech Republic

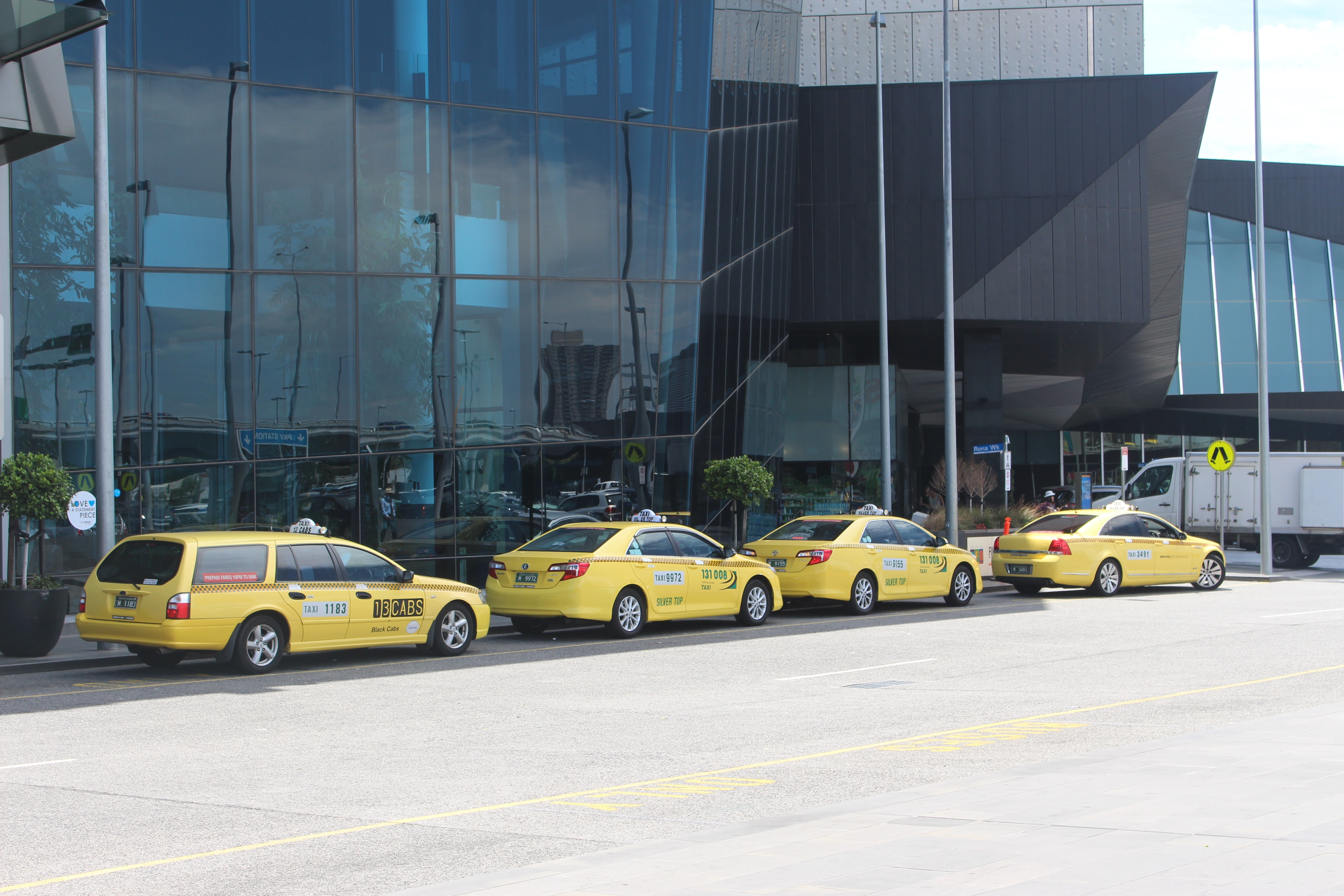
A taxi rank outside Melbourne Convention and Exhibition Centre in Melbourne, Australia

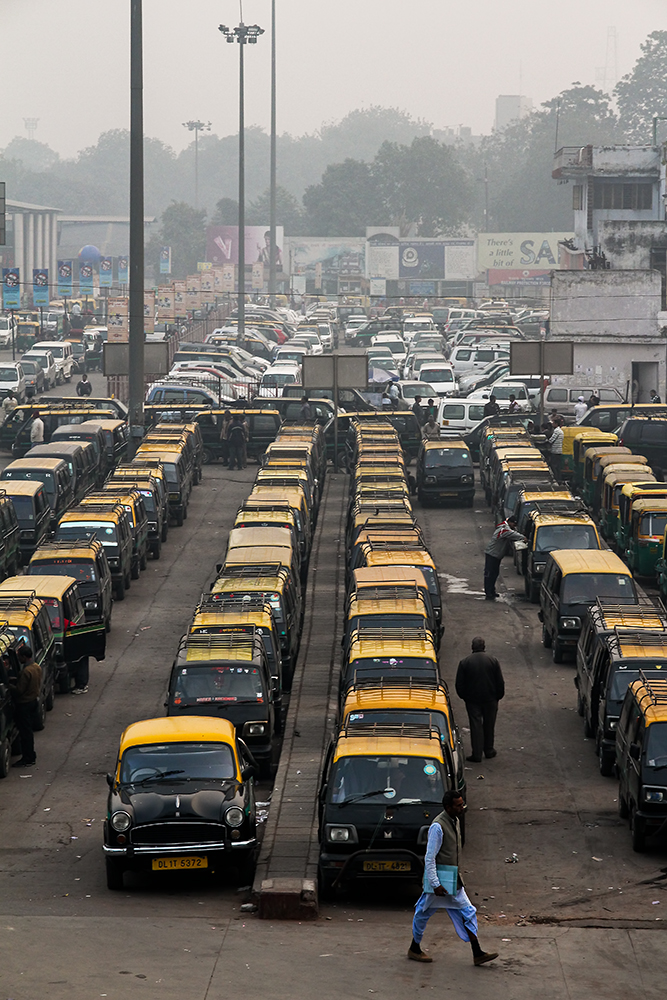
Taxi stand outside Delhi Junction railway station in India

A taxi stand (also called taxi rank, cab stand, cab rank, or hack stand) is a queue area on a street or on private property where taxicabs line up to wait for passengers.

== Operation ==
Stands are normally located at high-traffic locations such as airports, hotel driveways, railway stations, subway stations, bus depots, ferry terminals, shopping centres, and major street intersections. Usually stands are marked by simple painted signs.

Stands generally work as a first-come, first-served queue, so that the first taxicab to arrive on the stand (the one at the front of the line) serves the first passenger to arrive, and as the first taxicab leaves, each taxicab behind it moves ahead one spot, with the last taxicab to arrive taking the last spot.

In the Republic of Ireland an intending passenger is entitled to choose any taxicab that is available for hire at an appointed taxi stand. The Commission for Taxi Regulation has deemed that the customer has the right to choose and that the principle of first come, first served is dismissed.

== Around the world ==
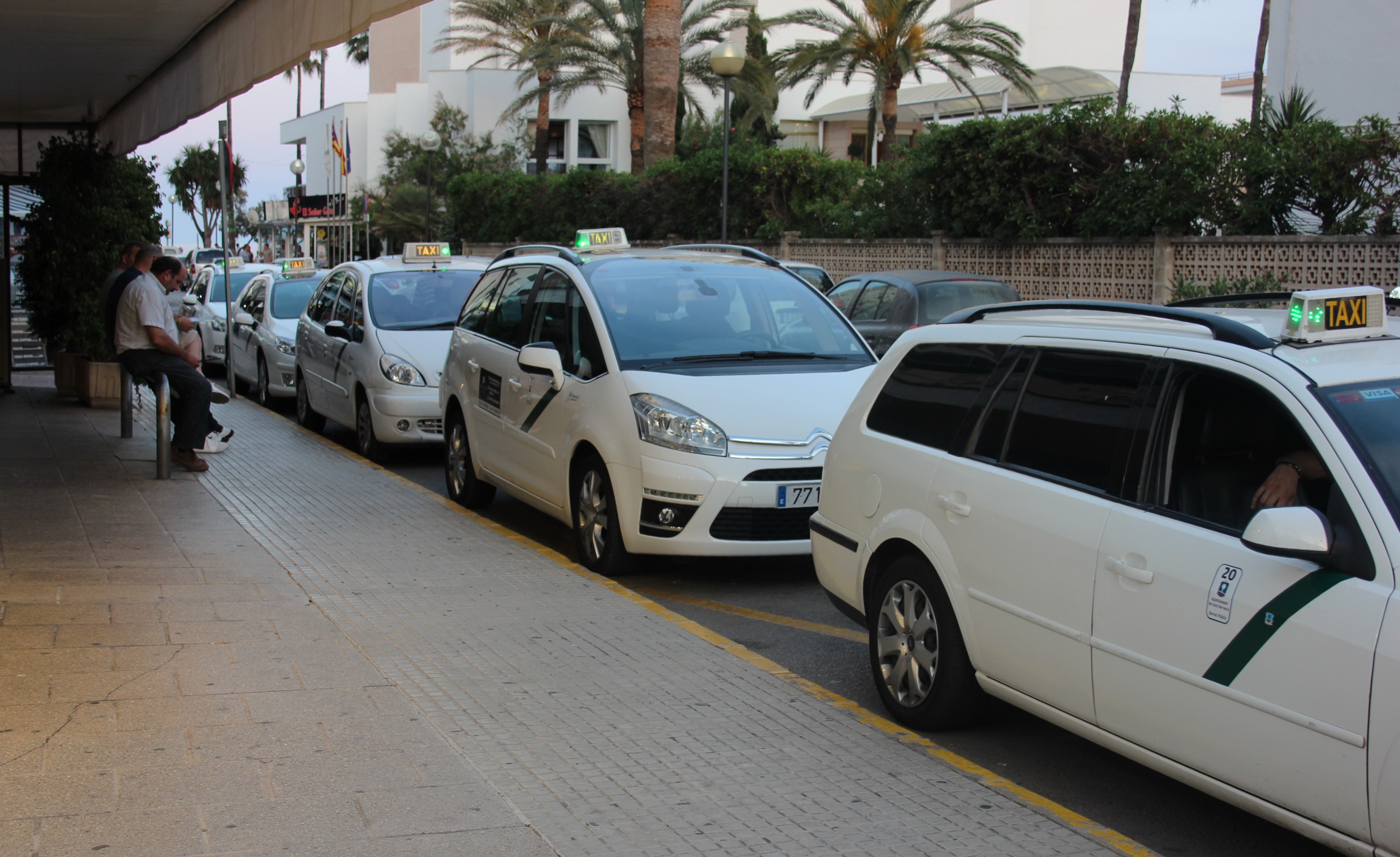
Taxi stand in Cala Millor, Spain

In some cities, such as London and New York, some older taxi stands are marked by special lamps with "TAXI" painted on the sides of them.

Some major stands are divided into separate queues. For example, at the Nagoya railway station in Japan, small- and large-capacity taxis line up separately; while at Shanghai Hongqiao International Airport in Shanghai, short- and long-distance taxis use separate queues. In Hong Kong, different kinds of taxis line up separately, as some of their service areas overlap.

== Battery recharging ==
Taxicab stands can also include charging stations to recharge the batteries of electric taxis.

== See also ==
- Cab-rank rule – English legal obligation to accept clients
- Electric vehicle
