= Roche v Roche =

Irish Supreme Court case

- Coat of arms of Ireland
- Court: Supreme Court of Ireland
- Full case name: Mary Roche, Plaintiff v Thomas Roche, Anthony Walsh, David Walsh and Sims Clinic Limited, Defendants; The Attorney General, Notice Party
- Decided: 15 December 2009
- Citation: Roche v Roche [2010] 2 IR 321: [2009] IESC 8

Case history
- Appealed from: High Court
- Appealed to: Supreme Court

Court membership
- Judges sitting: McGovern J in the High Court and Murray CJ Denham Hardiman Geoghegan Fennelly JJ in the Supreme Court

Case opinions
- A frozen embryo is not considered "unborn" in terms of the Irish Constitution

Keywords
- Constitution; Personal Rights; Right to Life; Unborn; Right to Travel; Abortion; Suicide; Injunction

Roche v Roche [2010] 2 IR 321: [2009] IESC 82 is an Irish Supreme Court case which affirmed the High Court decision that frozen embryos did not constitute the “unborn” within the meaning of Article 40.3.3 of the Irish Constitution. The spirit of the Supreme Court's judgement was that frozen embryos were not extended the same right to life as given to embryos protected in the womb. With an increase in IVF (in vitro fertilisation) among couples, legal issues arise when the couple decide to separate or divorce. This is a landmark case as it gave a judgement on such a circumstance where a couple has separated but there are surplus embryos frozen at a clinic. The Court made its decision by ultimately taking into account the right to reproduce.

== Facts of the case ==
The Roches (Mary and Thomas) were married in 1992. Mary gave birth to a son in 1997. Subsequently, she underwent surgery for an ovarian cyst and she lost part of an ovary. Again she had a fertility treatment in 2001 which proved to be unsuccessful. In July of the same year, the couple underwent in-vitro fertilization (IVF) at Sims Clinic Limited. As a result of this treatment, six viable embryos were created. Three embryos were used; three were frozen. As a result, Mary became pregnant and gave birth to a girl in 2002. Both signed consent forms and various other forms involving egg retrieval and embryo freezing. They both took full responsibility for the cyro-preserved embryos.

The relationship between the couple broke down towards the end of the second pregnancy. They entered into judicial separation but they were still legally married. The Plaintiff wished to have the remaining embryos implanted into her uterus but Thomas objected to having another child with the Plaintiff and refused consent. As a result, Sims Clinic was unwilling to release them. In 2005, Sims Clinic informed both parties that they had "not received any payment" for the embryos since 2003 and that this failure resulted in a breach of unit policy which rendered the storage contract as void. With this in mind, Mary initiated proceedings in the court.

=== Issues ===
The court had to resolve a number of issues:

1. Are frozen embryos considered "unborn" in the context of Article 40.3.3 of the Irish Constitution (this has since been updated by the abortion referendum in 2018 to Article 40.3 of the Constitution).
2. Did the consent requirement end with the judicial separation.
3. Did Mary Roche have a right to the embryos.

=== Constitutional interpretation ===
Article 40.3.3° of the Irish Constitution stated that:

"The State acknowledges the right to life of the unborn and, with due regard to the equal right to life of the mother, guarantees in its laws to respect, and, as far as practicable, by its laws to defend and vindicate that right."

Today this section has been removed altogether by Article 40.3 which states "provision may be made by law for the regulation of termination of pregnancy."

As Article 40.3.3° did not define what was meant by "unborn" it was left to the courts to define the term and what it needed to protect.

=== Judgment of the High Court ===
The High Court decision was delivered by McGovern J on 18 July 2006 in which he held that Mr Roche did not give express or implied consent to the implantation of the remaining embryos into Mrs Roche's uterus. It was not specified in the contract what should happen if a situation like the present one arises. To say Mr Roche is required by the contract to give consent to the implantation is false as there is nothing in the contracts binding him to do so. The most important issue before the Court was whether the embryos were 'unborn' for the purpose of Article 40.3.3° of the Irish Constitution.

Witnesses were called to the stand, some of whom argued that from the moment an egg is fertilized by a sperm new human life begins. Others argued that human life only began once the embryo was implanted into the uterus. Another group of witnesses said that it was impossible to say when human life begins.

Ultimately, the Court decided that since frozen embryos were not "unborn" within the meaning of Article 40.3.3, the rights arising under Article 41 were invalid. Also, it is not the Court's duty to explain the legal status of an embryo outside the womb. This matter is exclusively for the Oireachtas to decide on.

The decision was subsequently appealed to the Supreme Court where the appeal was dismissed.

== Holding of the Supreme Court ==
The main issue that the Court dealt with is whether the frozen embryos stored in Sims Clinic can be protected under Article 40.3.3 of the Constitution by falling within the scope of an unborn as mentioned in the subsection. This is an issue under the rubrics of public law. Whereas the dispute about implied consent in the contractual arrangements between both parties falls within the realm of private law. In any case, the Appellant essentially argued that the frozen embryos did have a right to life despite the Defendant's objection. Appellant maintained this claim on foot of Article 40.3.3.

The Court ruled against Mary and upheld the decision of the High Court. It concluded that frozen embryos were not "unborn" until they are actually implanted in a uterus. The court chided the legislature for failing to pass laws regarding embryos. Nevertheless, the Court did state that if a woman's only chance of having a child was access to frozen embryos then consent by an ex-partner could not be refused.

== Subsequent developments ==
The Eighth Amendment was placed into the Irish Constitution in 1983 which made abortion illegal in Ireland. In May 2018 the Irish population voted to repeal this amendment and it was signed into law on September 25, 2018.

Roche v Roche was cited in the case of A and Others v Ireland held in the European Court of Human Right

== See also ==
- Supreme Court of Ireland
- High Court (Ireland)
- Legal separation
- Eighth Amendment of the Constitution of Ireland
- Brian McGovern (judge)
- Oireachtas
