= Stockholm Institute for Scandinavian Law =

Swedish research institute

The Stockholm Institute for Scandinavian Law was established in 1956 with the objective to disseminate knowledge about Scandinavian law and legal theory abroad. To achieve this objective, the Institute publishes Scandinavian Studies in Law (Sc.St.L.), which is a book series containing articles by Scandinavian academics and legal experts. Professor Folke Schmidt, a revered scholar at Stockholm University, founded the Institute and was the first editor of Scandinavian Studies in Law.

== Scandinavian Law ==
Scandinavia is a generic term denoting five European countries: Denmark, Finland, Iceland, Norway, and Sweden. The Scandinavian countries share a common history and are closely related by language and culture. As such, the countries have a common legal tradition and a history of cooperation in many areas of law. Denmark, Finland and Sweden are members of the European Union. Norway and Iceland are members of the European Economic Area and are thereby part of the EU single market. Geographically, the Scandinavian peninsula comprises Norway, Sweden, and the northernmost part of Finland.

== Scandinavian Studies in Law ==
Each volume of Scandinavian Studies in Law focuses on a specific legal topic and the work is conducted under the auspices of a Volume Editor who is an expert in the field. This strategy makes it possible to present a complete and comprehensive analysis of developments in different legal fields. Most of the articles have never before been published, although on occasion, the series presents translations of previously published articles from the Scandinavian countries. The first volume was published in 1957, and to date, about 1000 articles have been published.

The Stockholm Institute for Scandinavian Law is led by an editorial board appointed by the Stockholm University Law Faculty. The day-to-day work is administrated by a General Editor, appointed by the board. An advisory committee provides support. Financial support for the publication of Scandinavian Studies in Law has been generously provided by a number of contributors.

Volumes 1-37, issued between 1957 and 1993, were yearbooks of a conventional kind, each reflecting a variety of legal topics.

After a brief embargo, the volumes are freely available in full text on the Institute's homepage. The articles are also available on HeinOnline and LAWPUB.

=== Editorial Board, General Editor and Advisory Committee ===
The current board consists of Antonina Bakardjieva Engelbrekt, LL.D., Professor in European Integration Law, Stockholm University, Said Mahmoudi, LL.D., Professor in International Law, Stockholm University and Petra Herzfeld Olsson, LL.D., Professor of Labour Law, Stockholm University. Professor Bakardjieva Engelbrekt is the chair.

The current editor is Lydia Lundstedt, LL.D., Senior Lecturer, Private International Law, Stockholm University. The previous editors have been Folke Schmidt, Professor of Private Law (1956-1980); Anders Victorin, Professor of Private Law (1980-1995); Bill W. Dufwa, Professor of Insurance Law (1995-1996); and Peter Wahlgren, LL.D., Professor, Law and Information Technology (1996-2019).

The Advisory Committee consists of Ruth Nielsen, LL.D., Professor, Copenhagen Business School, Denmark; Aðalheiður Jóhannsdóttir, LL.D., Professor, University of Iceland; Tuomas Pöysti, LL.D., The Chancellor of Justice, Finland; Ole-Andreas Rognstad, LL.D., Professor, University of Oslo, Norway.
