= Refresher =

Legal fee

In common law jurisdictions, a refresher or refresher fee is a type of legal costs and can refer to one of two things:

(i) an additional fee paid to counsel if a court case lasts more than one day (ie a daily fee for subsequent days); or

(ii) a fee for getting up to speed following an adjournment or delay.

== Treatment ==
=== Australia ===
Refresher fees are payable in Australia, although the treatment differs by state. In Western Australia, a refresher fee might be payable when a trial does not go proceed as scheduled or is adjourned, for the additional work to prepare, or get back up to speed, for the hearing date. In the Australian Capital Territory (the ACT), refresher fees of no more than 2/3rds the brief fee might be allowed if a hearing lasted more than 5 hours. In the Federal courts, refresher fees could be allowed if a hearing lasted more than 4.5 hours.

=== England and Wales ===
When taking a case to court, barristers typically charge a brief fee, which includes pre-trial preparation and others and the fee for the first day of court. Refresher fees are the fees charged for every subsequent day of trial and might also be referred to as "daily fees".

Refresher fees had become fairly established by the 1880s although the amount charged was often controversial. Refreshers were first provided for formally in the Rules of the Supreme Court in 1893. Ten years after their introduction, the court still lamented the fact that the rules hadn't defined the term and the meaning of a refresher was still uncertain. At the time, a refresher could be allowed if a court case lasted longer than anticipated by the brief and could be paid if the matter was delayed more than 5 hours.

=== Hong Kong ===
Refreshers are payable in Hong Kong, where the brief fee is for the first court day and any preparation, whereas the refresher is for subsequent days and at a lower rate.

=== Trinidad and Tobago ===
In Trinidad and Tobago, a brief fee covers preparation and attendance for the first day of trial. Refreshers are additional.

== Bibliography ==
- Halsbury's Laws of England. First Edition. Volume 2. pp 421 & 422.
- Graham J Graham-Green. "Refresher fees". Criminal Costs and Legal Aid. Second Edition. Butterworths. London. 1969. Pages 137 and 138. See also pages 54, 75, 83, 223, 224, 229, 265, 277, 281 and 288.
- Thomas Snow, Charles Burney and Francis A Stringer. "Refresher fees". The Annual Practice 1897. Fifteenth Edition. Sweet and Maxwell. Stevens and Sons. Volume 1. pp 1195 and 1196.
- "Counsel's Fees - Refreshers" (1881) 70 The Law Times 292 (26 February 1881); 2 The Australian Law Times lxxxviii (No 40, 14 May 1881)
- "Proceedings affecting the Profession" (1888) 84 The Law Times 230 (No 2339, 28 January 1888)
- "Re Counsel's Right to a Refresher in a Criminal Case" (1914) 59 Solicitors Journal 150 (19 December 1914)

== See also ==
- Costs in English law
