= Bar of Ireland =

Irish professional association

The Bar of Ireland
- Barra na hÉireann

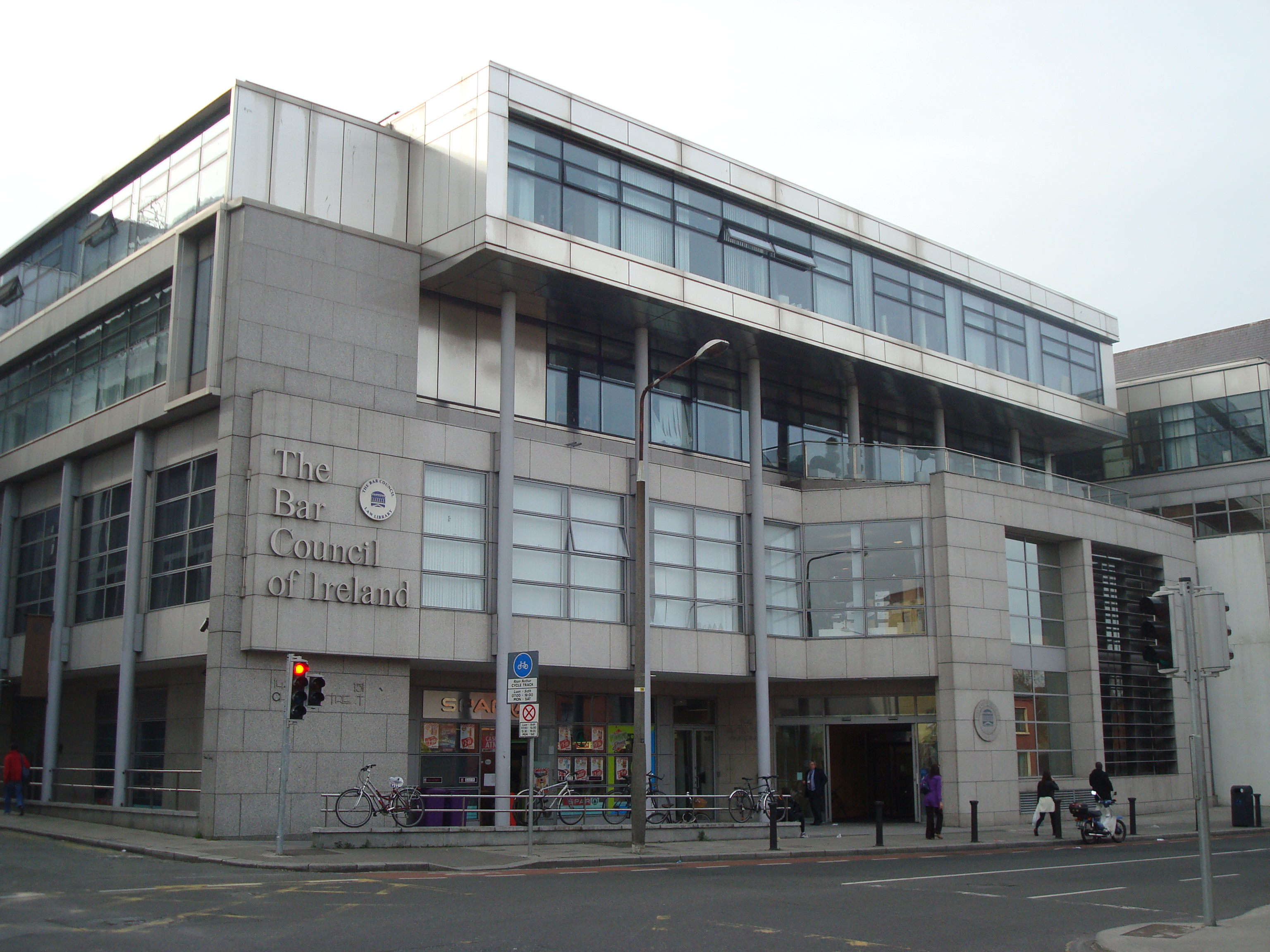
- Bar of Ireland headquarters, Dublin
- Predecessor: The Law Library Committee
- Formation: 1897
- Founded at: Dublin
- Type: Bar association
- Purpose: Educational, representative and regulatory
- Professional title: Barrister
- Headquarters: The Law Library, The Distillery Building, Church Street
- Location: Dublin, Ireland
- Region served: Ireland
- Members: 2,098 (June 2025)
- Official language: Irish and English
- Chair: Sara Phelan SC
- Funding: Professional and educational fees
- Staff: 74 (FTE) (2025)
- Website: www.lawlibrary.ie

The Bar of Ireland (Irish: Barra na hÉireann) is the professional association of barristers for Ireland, with over 2,000 members. It is based in the Law Library, with premises in Dublin and Cork. It is governed by the General Council of the Bar of Ireland, commonly called the Bar Council of Ireland, which was established in 1897. The Council is composed of twenty-five members: twenty who are elected, four co-opted, and the Attorney-General, who holds office ex officio. Every year, ten members are elected for two-year terms; five by senior counsel and five by junior counsel.

The Bar of Ireland funds the Law Library, which has premises in Dublin in the Four Courts, Church Street, and the Criminal Courts of Justice, and also a smaller library in Cork. Nearly all barristers practising in Ireland are members of the Law Library, which is often used as a metonym for the Irish barrister profession itself. Before the creation of the Bar of Ireland in 1897, barristers in Ireland were only loosely organised through their occupation of the physical premises of the Law Library.

== Relationship with the Bar of Northern Ireland ==
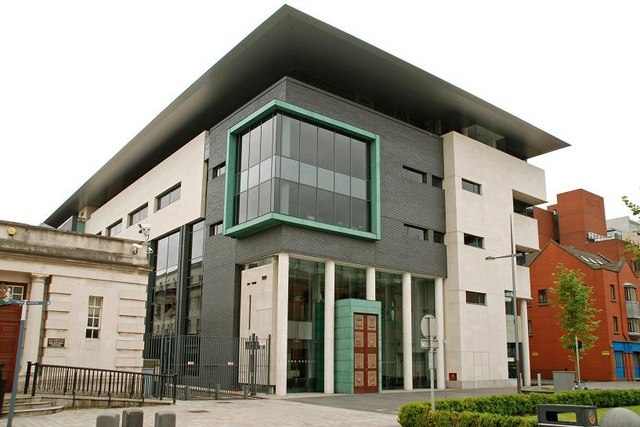
The Bar Library, Belfast

Before the partition of Ireland, barristers throughout the island of Ireland were trained at the King's Inns and were members of the Bar of Ireland. The Government of Ireland Act 1920 split Ireland into two legal jurisdictions, and after 1922, Northern Ireland became a separate legal system. The King's Inns initially hoped partition would not end its all-island remit, and it set up a "Committee of Fifteen" Northern Ireland benchers in 1922. However, this committee sought more independence, and from 11 January 1926, the Inn of Court of Northern Ireland and the Bar Council of Northern Ireland were created.

The Bar of Ireland collaborates with the Bar of Northern Ireland on various initiatives, including the Irish Rule of Law International. The two associations jointly hosted the World Bar Conference in 2024.

Practising members of the Bar of Ireland are eligible to join the Bar of Northern Ireland without taking any further exams. Practising members of the Bar of Northern Ireland have a reciprocal eligibility.

== Development of the Bar of Ireland ==
The profession of barrister has been in existence in Ireland since the arrival of the common law system in the 12th century, and co-existed with the profession of aigne until the abolition of the native Brehon law system in approximately the 17th century.

In 1541, the Honorable Society of King’s Inns was established on what is now the site of the Four Courts. This meant that Irish barristers could now train within Ireland, albeit with an obligation to keep terms in one of the Inns of Court in London. This requirement was costly to Irish barristers and was a contentious issue until it was abolished by the Barristers' Admission (Ireland) Act, 1885.

The regulation of barristers in Ireland increased during the 18th century. The Benchers of the Honorable Society of King’s Inns was the profession's de facto governing body. Originally, the Benchers consisted of the Lord Chancellor, the judges of the superior courts, some senior officers of the superior courts and all the senior members of the Bar, including the Attorney-General, the Solicitor General and the three Serjeants. The Benchers had the power to censure or disbar barristers.

At a meeting of the Irish Bar in February 1816, the Law Library Society was established for the purposes of providing a subscription-based lending library of legal texts to practising barristers. This led to the development of the Law Library as a distinctive feature of the Irish Bar whereby members of the Bar practised not from chambers but from a common library to which they subscribed.

The General Council of the Bar of Ireland was established following a meeting of the Irish Bar in 1897.

Following the Partition of Ireland in 1921, all existing members of the Bar of Ireland became members of both the Bar of Ireland and the Bar of Northern Ireland, with all members having a right of audience in the courts of both jurisdictions. The Bar of Ireland agreed to provide the Bar of Northern Ireland with copies of law reports in order to assist it in establishing a library.

The Law Library was originally a small room attached to the Four Courts intended to accommodate barristers before and between court appearances. Before there was a Law Library, barristers simply stood around in the main hall of the Four Courts to attract clients. Today, the main Law Library extends to a suite of rooms behind the Four Courts building, owned and maintained by the Office of Public Works, with two large stand-alone buildings on nearby Church Street, and a small law library in Cork city, owned by Law Library Properties Ltd, a private company. Today, the Office of Public Works and the Bar Council of Ireland fund the various Law Library premises; but as the Bar Council is an unincorporated association, and cannot own property, it relies on some of its barrister-members to act on its behalf as directors of Law Library Properties Ltd.

The Bar of Ireland's code of conduct was changed on 13 March 2006 in a preliminary report on the barristers' profession. In December 2006, the Competition Authority produced a detailed report outlining and highlighting self-regulating procedures created and enforced by The Bar of Ireland. Three months later, the Government's Better Regulation Unit (a branch of the Department of the Taoiseach) found that The Bar of Ireland had actually set out important professional standards and rules and maintained and enforced those standards and rules even though statute did not put any onus on The Bar of Ireland to do so.

In 2007, former University President of University College Dublin, Art Cosgrove obtained the Barrister-at-Law degree qualification from King's Inns but declined to take the statutory Irish exams needed to be called to the Bar by the Chief Justice of Ireland. Despite being fluent in Irish, he took legal action challenging the requirement, under the Legal Practitioners (Qualification) Act, 1929, to take an Irish examination. The law was changed to provide a system for Barristers to learn Irish as part of their studies, but without having to undertake an exam.

Barristers were allowed to advertise their services for the first time in 2008, subject to guidelines published by The Bar of Ireland. The information may be illustrated by a "passport-style photograph of the barrister."

Notwithstanding its status as a private, unincorporated association The Bar of Ireland has been designated as one of the state's two competent authorities for the regulation of the legal profession within the state (the other being the Law Society of Ireland). These regulations define a barrister as "a person who has been called to the Bar of Ireland and who complies with the requirements of the Bar of Ireland as to professional practice".

== Barristers' chambers ==
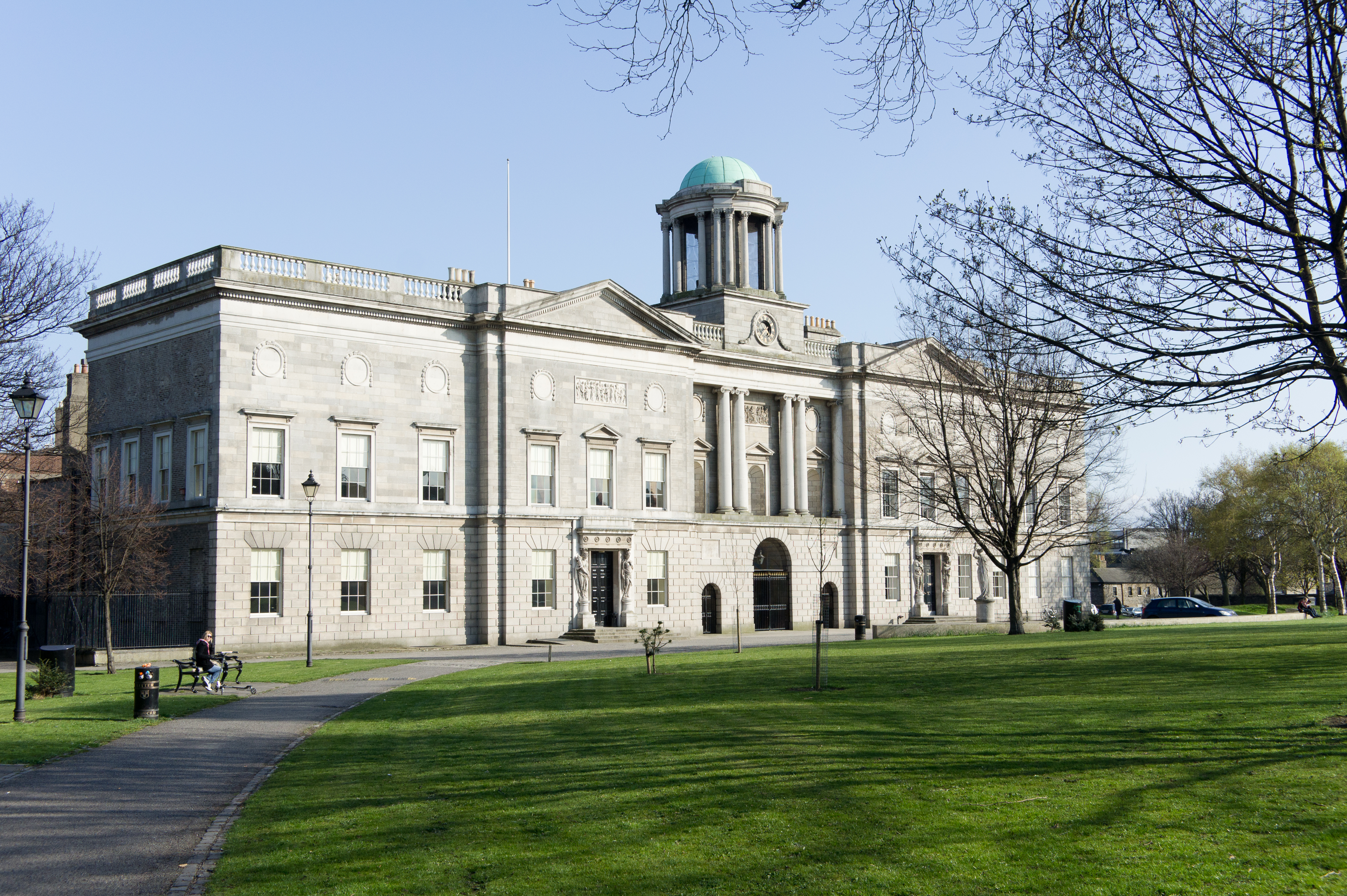
The King's Inns

Unlike some other jurisdictions, there is no system of barristers' chambers in either jurisdiction in Ireland. Rather, most barristers in Northern Ireland practice from the common Bar Library and most in the Republic of Ireland practice from the common Law Library; in each case, barristers pay a subscription to be members.

Until 1885, all intending Irish barristers were obliged to "keep terms" in one of the English Inns of Court before being called to the Bar of Ireland and being entitled to practise as barristers in Ireland. Following on from these close historical links to the English Bar, for much of the nineteenth century it appeared that a system of barristers' chambers would develop in Ireland.

Initially, the benchers of the King's Inns (which trained barristers in Ireland) made plans to build chambers for Irish barristers, in the vicinity of Dublin's Henrietta Street. From about 1793, the benchers went so far as to decide to have chambers built, funded both by the King's Inns and by barristers who would lease building land from the benchers for their own chambers. Deposits were levied annually from new barristers and solicitors, and rules were even agreed by the benchers for the regulation of tenancies by Irish barristers in chambers. However, despite this levying of the profession, following practical objections raised by the architect James Gandon concerning the difficulty of building the main King's Inns building at the same time as private chambers, the barristers' chambers were never built. To this day, no system of barristers' chambers has ever been developed in Northern Ireland or the Republic of Ireland.

== Notable barristers ==
Frances Kyle, the first woman called to the Bar of Ireland

- The first woman barrister in either Ireland or Great Britain was Frances "Fay" Kyle, who was born in Belfast in 1893. She was called to the Bar of Ireland on 1 November 1921. She had graduated from Trinity College Dublin with a BA in French in 1914 and an LLB in 1916. She had commenced her studies at the King's Inns in Dublin in January 1920. From 1922, she practiced on the Northern Ireland Circuit.
- Denis Henry was called to the Bar of Ireland in 1885 and became the first Lord Chief Justice of Northern Ireland following the partition of Ireland in 1921.
- Daniel O'Connell, the famous MP who championed Catholic emancipation, was a member of the Bar of Ireland and practised as a barrister.
- Six Taoisigh (John A. Costello, Jack Lynch, Liam Cosgrave, Charles Haughey, Garret FitzGerald and John Bruton) have been barristers by profession.

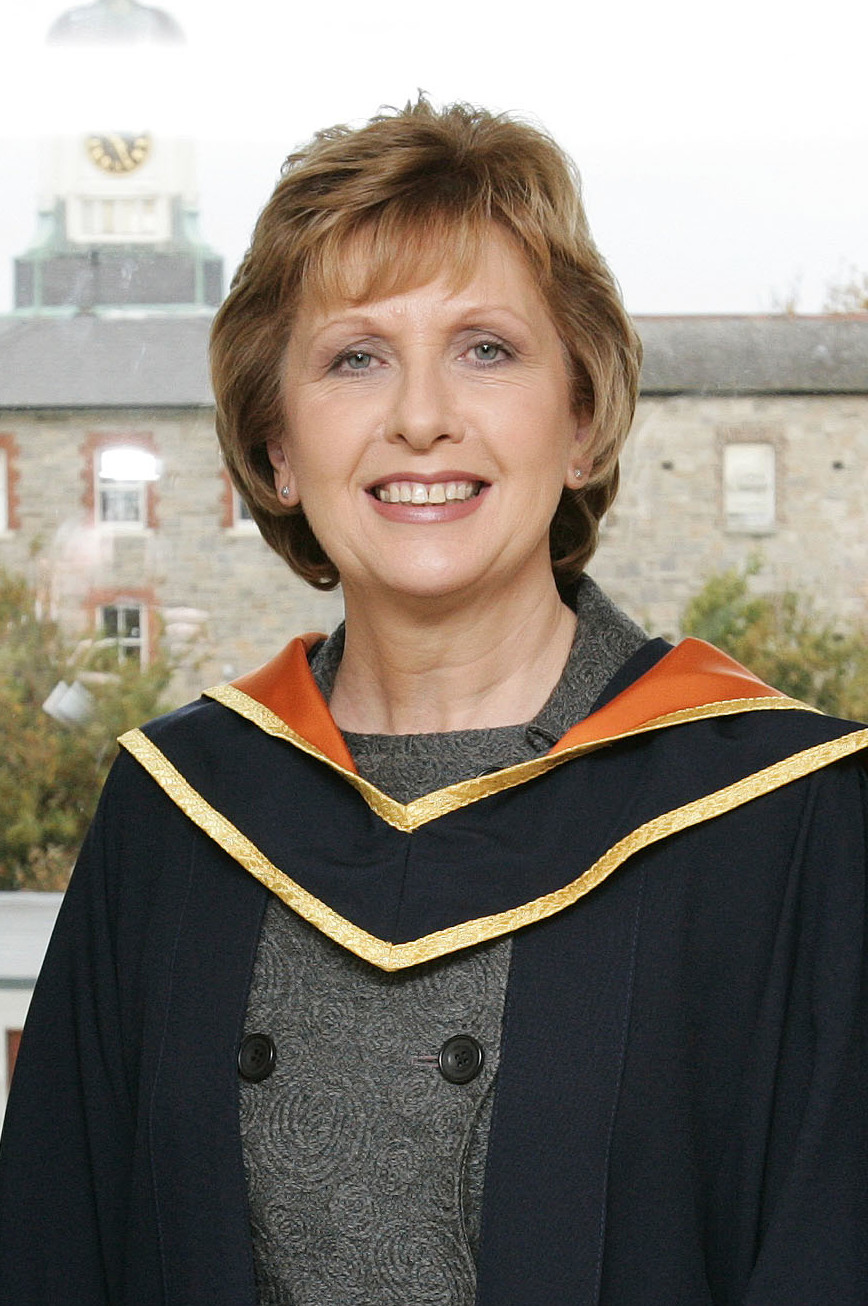
Mary McAleese, barrister and former President of Ireland

- Three Presidents (Cearbhall Ó Dálaigh, Mary Robinson and Mary McAleese) have been barristers by profession. Ó Dálaigh was also Chief Justice prior to being elected president. Robinson was Ireland's first female president and went on to become the UN High Commissioner for Human Rights. McAleese was also a law lecturer and broadcaster.
- Of the six Irish European Commissioners since 1973, four have been barristers: Richard Burke, Michael O'Kennedy, Peter Sutherland and David Byrne.
- Seán MacBride, who was the only person to be awarded both the Nobel Peace Prize and the Lenin Peace Prize, was also a barrister.

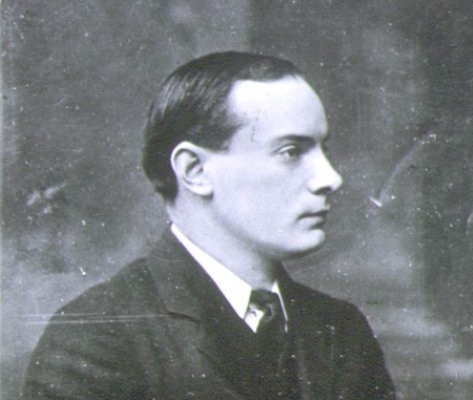
Patrick Pearse, barrister and Irish revolutionary

- Patrick Pearse, the leading Irish revolutionary of the twentieth century, had an early interest in the law, trained to be a barrister at the King's Inns and was called to the bar in 1901. He practised at the bar for a time, but instead of pursuing a legal career he decided to spend his life challenging the existing authority in the country.

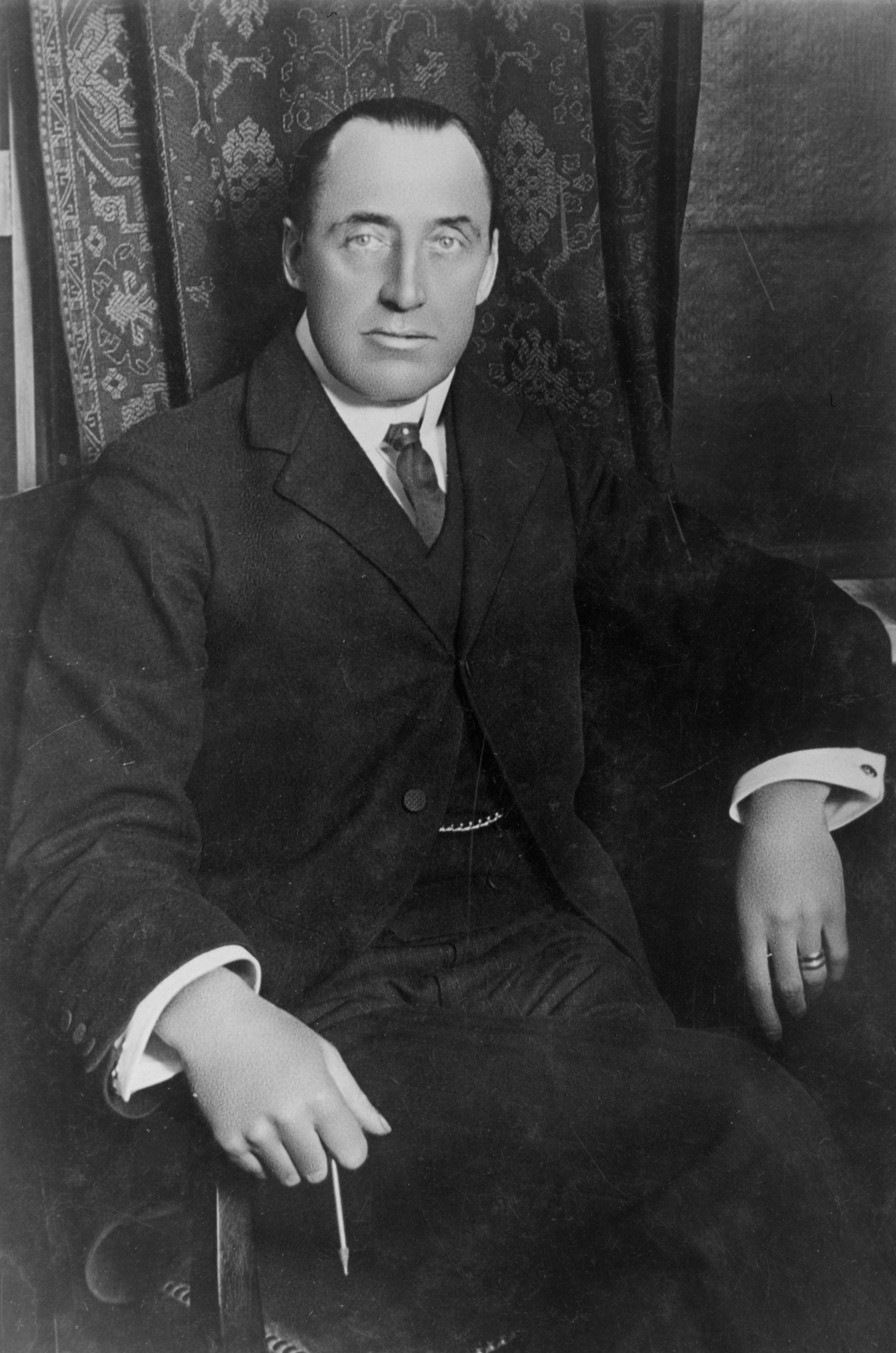
Edward Carson, barrister and Irish unionist politician

- Edward Carson, the famous orator and politician, began his career as a barrister when he was called to the Bar of Ireland in 1877.
- The first leader of the Irish Parliamentary Party was Isaac Butt, one of the most skilled barristers of the day.
- Robert Emmet, the Irish revolutionary, studied at the King's Inns; the brilliance of his speech from the dock captured the popular imagination and created a powerful and enduring legend.
- Other famous Irish barristers include John FitzGibbon, 1st Earl of Clare, Wolfe Tone, and Henry Grattan.

== Distinction between junior and senior counsel ==
The government of Ireland, at its discretion, grants patents of precedence at the bar on the recommendation of an Advisory Committee consisting of the Chief Justice, the President of the High Court, the Attorney General, and the Chairman of the General Council of the Bar of Ireland. The effect of this is to designate a barrister as a senior counsel, a recognition of advanced professional ability which can be a step towards appointment as a judge and which also generally means that the barrister can command higher fees. Barristers who have not been recognised in this way are "junior counsel". Senior counsel wear a silk gown which differs from the plainer gown of junior counsel. The wig, like those worn in England and Wales, is now optional.

The Irish Free State became independent in 1922 as a Dominion. Shortly after the Courts of Justice Act 1924 came into effect, Chief Justice Hugh Kennedy agreed with the Bar Council of Ireland to change the procedure for issuing patents of precedence. From July 1924, the term "King's Counsel" was replaced on Irish patents by "Senior Counsel"; which were issued by the Chief Justice, although the "privilege of patent" continued to fall within the royal prerogative until transferred to the Executive Council of the Irish Free State (the government) by the Executive Powers (Consequential Provisions) Act 1937. However, the title "King's Counsel" continued to be used by many senior counsel, whether created before July 1924 or after. As late as the 1960s, R. G. L. Leonard was described in the official Irish law reports as "Queen’s Counsel", reflecting the change from King to Queen in 1952.

In 1949, shortly before the coming into force of The Republic of Ireland Act 1948 which broke the final link with the Crown, Frank Aiken asked John A. Costello in Dáil Éireann "whether, in view of the fact that certain members of the Inner Bar who received their patents as senior counsel continue to describe themselves as king's counsel, he will introduce a Bill entitled an Act to declare that the description of a senior counsel shall be senior counsel"; however, Costello said he had "no intention of wasting public time and money" on this.

On 13 June 2000, Jan O'Sullivan asked in the Dáil:

"when the Government first granted patents of precedence to barristers at the Irish Bar; the historical circumstances giving rise to the decision to make the grant of patents of precedence to barristers at the Irish Bar by the Government; the basis for the grant of patents of precedence by the Government to barristers at the Irish Bar; and if he will make a statement on the matter."

The Taoiseach replied:

Since the establishment of the State, the Government has granted patents of precedence to barristers leading to the call to the senior Bar by the Chief Justice. Historically, at common law, the grant of silk was an exercise of the royal prerogative. The transfer of functions which had previously been dependent on the royal prerogative, to the Executive Council of Saorstát Éireann was clarified by section 2 of the Executive Powers (Consequential Provisions) Act, 1937. The function is now exercised by the Government as successor to the executive council and is no longer dependent on the royal prerogative.

On 4 July 2001 the Taoiseach stated that the Government had "no plans to change the procedures for the granting of patents of precedence."

In 2009, the Special Group on Public Service Numbers and Expenditure Programmes said that it had looked at the difference in the level of legal fees payable to junior and senior counsel.

== See also ==
- King's Inns, an institution which trains barristers and regulates their admission to the bar in Ireland
- Bar of Northern Ireland, the professional association for barristers in Northern Ireland

== Sources ==
- The Law Library, Dublin
