= Mergers and acquisitions in United Kingdom law =

Mergers and acquisitions in United Kingdom law refers to a body of law that covers companies, labour, and competition, which is engaged when firms restructure their affairs in the course of business.

== Company law ==
In company law, three main areas regulate mergers and acquisitions (also, reconstructions or takeovers). There are three main areas of law, those to do with schemes of arrangement overseen by a court, those for general reconstructions, demergers, amalgamations and so on that are not overseen by a court, and takeovers, which concern acquisitions of public companies.

=== Scheme of Arrangement ===
- Insolvency Act 1986, ss.110–111, on schemes of arrangement or reconstructions
- Bisgood v. Henerson's Transvaal Estates Ltd [1908] 1 Ch 743
- Griffith v. Paget (1877) 5 Ch D 894, per Jessel MR
- Re Anglo-Continental Supply Co Ltd [1922] 2 Ch 723, per Astbury J

=== Reconstructions ===
- Companies Act 2006, Parts 26 (ss.895–901) and Part 27 (special rules for public companies), on arrangements, reconstructions, mergers (or amalgamations) or divisions (demerger or "scission"). The rules here implement the Third and Sixth EC Company law directives.
- Re Alabama, New Orleans, Texas and Pacific Junction Railway Co. [1891] 1 CH 213, per Lindley LJ
- Re Hellenic & General Trust Ltd [1976] 1 WLR 123, per Templeman J
- Re BTR plc [1999] 2 BCLC 675, per Jonathan Parker J
- Re Hawk Insurance Co Ltd [2001] 2 BCLC 675; [2002] BCC 300, per Chadwick LJ
- Re Equitable Life Assurance Society [2002] BCC 319

=== Takeovers ===
Takeovers refers to acquisitions of one company by another. In the City of London, the Panel on Takeovers and Mergers, established in 1968, oversees Companies Act duties, including those laid down in the European Directive on Takeover Bids (2004/25/EC) for public companies. Under the Companies Act 2006, s.979 gives a takeover bidder who has already acquired 90% of a company's shares the right to compulsorily buy out the remaining shareholders (squeeze out). Conversely, s.983 allows minority shareholders to insist their stakes are bought out. The rules come under Part 28 of the Act.

More generally, the City Code on Takeovers and Mergers(also called "City Code" or "Takeover Code") lays down rules for a takeover, found in the so-called Blue Book. The Code used to be a non-statutory set of rules that was controlled by City institutions on a theoretically voluntary basis. However, as a breach of the Code brought such reputational damage and the possibility of exclusion from City services run by those institutions, it was regarded as binding. In 2006, the Code was put onto a statutory footing as part of the UK's compliance with the European Directive on Takeovers.

The Code requires that all shareholders in a company should be treated equally, regulates when and what information companies must and cannot release publicly in relation to the bid, sets timetables for certain aspects of the bid, and sets minimum bid levels following a previous purchase of shares.

In particular:

- a shareholder must make an offer when its shareholding, including that of parties acting in concert (a "concert party"), reaches 30% of the target ("mandatory bid rule");
- information relating to the bid must not be released except by announcements regulated by the Code;
- the bidder must make an announcement if rumour or speculation have affected a company's share price;
- the level of the offer must not be less than any price paid by the bidder in the twelve months before the announcement of a firm intention to make an offer;
- if shares are bought during the offer period at a price higher than the offer price, the offer must be increased to that price;

The Rules Governing the Substantial Acquisition of Shares, which used to accompany the Code and which regulated the announcement of certain levels of shareholdings, have now been abolished, because it was viewed to be unnecessarily restrictive of shares between 15% and 29.9% of a company's voting rights.

== Labour law ==
The Transfer of Undertakings (Protection of Employment) Regulations came into force in 1981 and implement a European Directive on takeovers.

== Competition law ==
UK law on merger control follows European Union law. The competence to deal with issues that only affect the UK market falls under the OFT and Competition Commission's jurisdiction. These two institutions are influential players in the development of European merger law. The term under EC law for merger is "concentration", which exists when a...

"change of control on a lasting basis results from (a) the merger of two or more previously independent undertakings... (b) the acquisition... if direct or indirect control of the whole or parts of one or more other undertakings." Art. 3(1), Regulation 139/2004, the European Community Merger Regulation

This usually means that one firm buys out the shares of another. The reasons for oversight of economic concentrations by the state are the same as the reasons to restrict firms who abuse a position of dominance, only that regulation of mergers and acquisitions attempts to deal with the problem before it arises, ex ante prevention of creating dominant firms. In the case of [T-102/96] Gencor Ltd v. Commission [1999] ECR II-753 the EU Court of First Instance wrote merger control is there "to avoid the establishment of market structures which may create or strengthen a dominant position and not need to control directly possible abuses of dominant positions". What amounts to a substantial lessening of, or significant impediment to competition is usually answered through empirical study. The market shares of the merging companies can be assessed and added, although this kind of analysis only gives rise to presumptions, not conclusions. Something called the Herfindahl-Hirschman Index is used to calculate the "density" of the market, or what concentration exists. Aside from the maths, it is important to consider the product in question and the rate of technical innovation in the market. A further problem of collective dominance, or oligopoly through "economic links" can arise, whereby the new market becomes more conducive to collusion. It is relevant how transparent a market is, because a more concentrated structure could mean firms can coordinate their behaviour more easily, whether firms can deploy deterrents and whether firms are safe from a reaction by their competitors and consumers. The entry of new firms to the market, and any barriers that they might encounter should be considered.

== See also ==
- UK competition law
- UK labour law
- UK company law
