= 1974 New Year Honours =

British royal recognitions

The New Year Honours 1974 were appointments in many of the Commonwealth realms of Queen Elizabeth II to various orders and honours to reward and highlight good works by citizens of those countries. They were announced on 1 January 1974 to celebrate the year passed and mark the beginning of 1974.

The recipients of honours are displayed here as they were styled before their new honours.

At this time honours for Australians were still being awarded in the UK honours on the advice of the premiers of Australian states. The Australian honours system began with the 1975 Queen's Birthday Honours.

== United Kingdom ==
=== Life peers ===
- Victor Grayson Hardie Feather, C.B.E., lately General Secretary, Trades Union Congress.
- Sir Denis Arthur Greenhill, G.C.M.G., O.B.E., lately Permanent Under- Secretary of State, Foreign and Commonwealth Office and Head of the Diplomatic Service.
- The Right Honourable Sir Burke St John Trend, G.C.B., C.V.O., lately Secretary of the Cabinet.

=== Privy Counsellor ===
- James Anthony Stodart, M.P., Minister of State, Ministry of Agriculture, Fisheries and Food.

=== Knight Bachelor ===
- William Wilkinson Addison, D.L., Chairman of Council, The Magistrates' Association.
- Alexander Sandor Alexander, chairman, Imperial Foods Ltd. For services to the food industry.
- Ralph Ellis Brook, C.M.G., O.B.E., President, Association of British Chambers of Commerce. For services to Export.
- John Gilbert Newton Brown, C.B.E., Publisher, Oxford University Press.
- Thomas Brown, chairman, former Northern Ireland Hospitals Authority.
- Daniel Norman Chester, C.B.E., Warden, Nuffield College, Oxford.
- Charles John Curran, Director-General, British Broadcasting Corporation.
- Alan Graham Dawtry, C.B.E., T.D., Town Clerk, City of Westminster.
- Nigel Thomas Loveridge Fisher, M.C., M.P. For political and public services.
- Herbert Raymond Gower, M.P. For political and public services.
- William Woolf Harris, O.B.E. For political and public services in London.
- Charles William Hayward, C.B.E. For charitable services, particularly in relation to the care of the elderly.
- Arthur Ford Hetherington, D.S.C., chairman, British Gas Corporation.
- John Maxwell Hill, C.B.E., D.F.C., Q.P.M., H.M. Chief Inspector of Constabulary.
- Stanley George Hooker, C.B.E., F.R.S., Group Technical Director, Rolls-Royce (1971) Ltd.
- Maurice George Kendall, F.B.A. For services to the theory of statistics.
- John Cowdery Kendrew, C.B.E., F.R.S. For services to the Ministry of Defence.
- Leslie Ernest Laycock, C.B.E., chairman, Leeds Regional Hospital Board.
- Jan Alfred Lewando, C.B.E., chairman, Carrington Viyella Ltd. For services to Export.
- Emile Littler. For services to the Theatre.
- Thomas Lodge, Consultant Radiologist, United Sheffield Hospitals.
- Herbert Reginald Mathys, T.D., lately deputy chairman, Courtaulds Ltd. For services to patent law.
- Leonard Francis Neal, C.B.E, chairman, Commission on Industrial Relations.
- Charles William Oatley, O.B.E., F.R.S., Emeritus Professor of Electrical Engineering, University of Cambridge.
- Daniel Eric Arthur Pettit, chairman, National Freight Corporation.
- Professor Cyril Henry Philips, Vice-Chancellor, University of London. Director, School of Oriental and African Studies.
- Charlie Dennis Pilcher, C.B.E, chairman, Commission for the New Towns.
- John Francis Prideaux, O.B.E., chairman, Board of Governors, St Thomas' Hospital, London; chairman, National Westminster Bank Ltd.
- Professor Hugh Norwood Robson, Vice-Chancellor, University of Sheffield.
- Frederick Henry Stewart, F.R.S., Regius Professor of Geology, University of Edinburgh.
- Francis Taylor, Founder, chairman and managing director, The Taylor Woodrow Group.
- James Henderson Waddell, C.B., Deputy Under-secretary of State, Home Office.
- Joseph Meredith Whittaker, T.D., D.L., chairman, Executive Council, County Councils Association of England and Wales.
- John Leslie Williams, C.B.E., lately Secretary General, Civil Service National Whitley Council (Staff Side).
- Harold Mario Mitchell Acton, C.B.E. For services to the British community in Florence and to Anglo-Italian relations.
- Mr Justice Darnley Arthur Raymond Alexander, C.B.E., Chief Justice, South-Eastern State, Nigeria.
- The Honourable Mr Justice Geoffrey Gould Briggs, Chief Justice, Hong Kong.
- Lawrence Kadoorie, C.B.E. For services to the community in Hong Kong.

==== Australian States ====
State of New South Wales

- James Frederick John Auswild, C.B.E. For services to commerce and the community.
- The Honourable John Bryan Munro Fuller, M.L.C., Minister for Decentralisation and Development.
- Charles David Griffin, C.B.E. For services to the community.
- Gregory Blaxland Kater. For services to commerce.

State of Victoria

- Albert Edward Chadwick, C.M.G., M.S.M., of Toorak. For services to the community.
- Alexander Reid Creswick, of Melbourne. For services to horse racing.
- The Honourable Mr Justice Urban Gregory Gowans. For services to the law.
- David Fletcher Jones, O.B.E., of Warrnambool. For services to the decentralisation of industry and to the community.

State of Queensland

- Byrne Hart, C.B.E., M.C., of Brisbane. For services to business, the community and the sporting life of Queensland.
- The Honourable John Alfred Row, of Ingham. For services to Queensland as a Minister of the Crown and Parliamentarian.

=== Order of the Bath ===
==== Knight Grand Cross of the Order of the Bath (GCB) ====
- Admiral Sir Edward Beckwith Ashmore, K.C.B., D.S.C.
- Air Chief Marshal Sir Andrew Humphrey, K.C.B., O.B.E, D.F.C, A.F.C., Royal Air Force.
- Sir Charles Craik Cunningham, K.C.B., K.B.E, C.V.O. For public services.

==== Knight Commander of the Order of the Bath (KCB) ====
- Vice Admiral Michael Frampton Fell, C.B., D.S.O., D.S.C.*
- Vice Admiral George Francis Allan Trewby.
- Lieutenant-General Edwin Noel Westby Bramall, O.B.E., M.C., late Infantry, Colonel Commandant 3rd Battalion The Royal Green Jackets.
- Major-General Jack Wentworth Harman, O.B.E., M.C., late Royal Armoured Corps.
- Acting Air Marshal Ruthven Lowry Wade, C.B., D.F.C., Royal Air Force.
- Michael Bowen Hanley, Attached Ministry of Defence.
- Nicholas Godfrey Morrison, C.B., Permanent Under-Secretary of State, Scottish Office.
- Anthony Nathaniel Stainton, C.B., First Parliamentary Counsel.
- Peter Eustace Thornton, C.B, Second Permanent Secretary, Department of Trade and Industry.

==== Companion of the Order of the Bath (CB) ====
Military Division

- Rear Admiral Sir Peter Anson, Bt.
- Rear Admiral Thomas Rennison Cruddas.
- Rear Admiral Edward William Ellis, C.B.E.
- Surgeon Rear Admiral Cyril Lawson Tait McClintock, O.B.E., Q.H.S.
- Rear Admiral Ian George William Robertson, D.S.C.
- Major-General William Bate, O.B.E., late Royal Corps of Transport, Colonel Commandant Royal Corps of Transport, now R.A.R O.
- Major-General Roger Sydenham Marshall, T.D., Army Legal Services Staff, now R.A.R.O.
- Major-General Horace Rollo Squarey Pain, M.C., late Royal Armoured Corps.
- Major-General James Howden Robertson, F.D.S., Queen's Honorary Dental Surgeon, late Royal Army Dental Corps.
- Major-General Ronald Macaulay Somerville, O.B.E., late Royal Regiment of Artillery.
- Air Vice-Marshal Alan Cyril Davies, C.B.E., Royal Air Force.
- Air Vice-Marshal Eric Plumtree, O.B.E., D.F.C., Royal Air Force.
- Air Vice-Marshal Rex David Roe, A.F.C, Royal Air Force.

Civil Division

- Arthur John Boreham, Deputy Secretary, Cabinet Office.
- Frederick Gordon Burrett, Deputy Secretary, Civil Service Department.
- David Cardwell, Director, Military Vehicles and Engineering Establishment, Ministry of Defence.
- Edward Geoffrey Cass, O.B.E., Deputy Secretary, Ministry of Defence.
- Basil Brodribb Hall, M.C., T.D., Deputy Treasury Solicitor.
- Douglas Arthur Lovelock, Deputy Secretary, Department of Trade and Industry.
- Hugh Avant Lowry, Comptroller and Auditor General for Northern Ireland.
- Thomas Hamilton Shearer, Deputy Chief Executive, Property Services Agency, Department of the Environment.
- Henry Alexander Shewan, O.B.E., National Insurance Commissioner.
- Arthur Roger Thatcher, Deputy Secretary, Department of Employment.
- Ryland Lowell Degwel Thomas, deputy director of Public Prosecutions.
- Geoffrey Charles Wardale, Deputy Secretary, Department of the Environment.
- Robert Windsor, Under Secretary, Department of Health and Social Security.
- Philip John Woodfield, C.B.E, Deputy Secretary, Northern Ireland Office.
- Robert Little Workman, Under Secretary, H.M. Treasury.

=== Order of St Michael and St George ===
==== Knight Grand Cross of the Order of St Michael and St George (GCMG) ====
- The Right Honourable George Rowland Stanley, Earl of Cromer, K.C.M.G., M.B.E., H.M. Ambassador, Washington.

==== Knight Commander of the Order of St Michael and St George (KCMG) ====
- Claude James Hayes, C.M G, chairman, Crown Agents for Oversea Governments and Administrations.
- (Ernest) John Ward Barnes, M.B.E., H.M. Ambassador, The Hague.
- Denis Seward Laskey, C.M.G., C.V.O., H.M. Ambassador, Vienna.
- David Aubrey Scott, C.M.G., British High Commissioner, Wellington.

===== Australian States =====
State of New South Wales

- The Honourable John Robert Kerr, C.M.G., Lieutenant Governor and Chief Justice.

==== Companion of the Order of St Michael and St George (CMG) ====
- Ian Donald Cameron, O.B.E., Senior Technical Adviser, Ministry of Defence.
- Robert Goldsmith, Under Secretary, Department of Trade and Industry.
- Air Commodore Norman Walter Kearon, C.B.E, Chief Executive, British Aircraft Corporation, Saudi Arabia.
- Walter Plowright, Professor of Veterinary Microbiology and Parasitology, Royal Veterinary College, University of London.
- John Roland Malcolm Whitehorn, Deputy Director-General, Confederation of British Industry. For services to Export.
- Derrick Charles Carden, H.M. Ambassador, Sana'a.
- Leonard Clifford William Figg, H.M. Consul-General, Milan.
- Ian Albert Clark Kinnear, Deputy Governor, Bermuda.
- Ian Macdonald Lightbody, Secretary for Housing, Hong Kong.
- Donald Hardman Macdonald, lately Manager, Banking Department, Bank for International Settlements, Basle.
- Arthur Frederick Maddocks, British Deputy High Commissioner, Ottawa.
- Peter Harold Reginald Marshall, Assistant Under-secretary of State, Foreign and Commonwealth Office.
- John Ernest Powell-Jones, H.M. Ambassador, Phnom Penh.
- Iain Johnstone Macbeth Sutherland, lately Counsellor, Foreign and Commonwealth Office.
- Alexander Neilson Strachan Walker, Counsellor, H.M. Embassy, Washington.

===== Australian States =====
State of Victoria

- George Frederick William Brown, lately Chairman of Commissioners, Victorian Railways.
- John Vincent Dillon, Under Secretary, Chief Secretary's Department.
- David Milton Myers, Vice Chancellor, La Trobe University.

State of Queensland

- Ivor Gray Morris, of Redbank. For services to industry and the community.

=== Royal Victorian Order ===
==== Knight Grand Cross of the Royal Victorian Order (GCVO) ====
- Sir John Wheeler Wheeler-Bennett, K.C.V.O, C.M.G., O.B.E.

==== Knight Commander of the Royal Victorian Order (KCVO) ====
- Arthur George Linfield, C.V.O., C.B.E.
- Sir Ivison Stevenson Macadam, C.V.O., C.B.E.
- Lieutenant-Colonel The Right Honourable Patrick Terence William Span, Baron Plunket, C.V.O.
- William Thomas Charles Skyrme, C.B., C.B.E., T.D.

==== Commander of the Royal Victorian Order (CVO) ====
- William Harry Gabb, M.V.O.
- Leslie William Green, M.B.E.
- Major Arthur John Stewart Griffin, M.V.O.
- Robert Lindsay, M.V.O., B.E.M.
- Colonel Donald Curtis McKinnon.
- George Albert Henry Pearce.

==== Member of the Royal Victorian Order (MVO) ====
At this time the two lowest classes of the Royal Victorian Order were "Member (fourth class)" and "Member (fifth class)", both with post-nominals MVO. "Member (fourth class)" was renamed "Lieutenant" (LVO) from the 1985 New Year Honours onwards.

Fourth Class

- Bernard Christian Briant, M.B.E.
- Kenneth Grant Chavasse.
- Reginald Joffre Elliott, M.V.O.
- Commander John Edwin Stroud Raymond, Royal Navy.
- Michael David Tims, M.V.O.

Fifth Class

- James Harper MacDonald.
- Kenneth William Moss.
- George Oakes.
- Ronald William Palmer.
- Miss Helen Dale Strange.
- William Hamilton Summers.
- Ernest Leslie Turnock, M.B.E.

==== Royal Victorian Medal (Silver) (RVM) ====
- Augustus Lawrence Gordon Belcher.
- Chief Technician Martin Richard Cockett, Royal Air Force.
- Chief Marine Engineering Mechanic Frank William Coupland.
- Victor Fletcher.
- Chief Petty Officer Steward Peter William Ford
- Yeoman Bed Goer Alfred Stephen Groves, Her Majesty's Bodyguard of the Yeomen of the Guard.
- Lawrence Hardy.
- Yeoman Bed Goer Richard Farquharson Hewlett, B.E.M., Her Majesty's Bodyguard of the Yeomen of the Guard.
- Acting Flight Sergeant Brian George Leach, Royal Air Force Regiment.
- Alfred May.
- Arthur Ernest Wakeling.
- David William Wise.

=== Order of the British Empire ===
==== Knight Grand Cross of the Order of the British Empire (GBE) ====
- The Right Honourable Hartley William, Baron Shawcross, Q.C., chairman, Panel on Takeovers and Mergers.

==== Dame Commander of the Order of the British Empire (DBE) ====
- Miss Josephine Barnes (Miss Alice Josephine Mary Taylor Barnes), Consultant Obstetrician and Gynaecologist, Charing Cross Hospital and Elizabeth Garrett Anderson Hospital.
- Emma Frances Heather, Mrs Clode, C.B.E., chairman, Women's Royal Voluntary Service.

===== Australian States =====
State of Victoria

- Phyllis Irene, Mrs Frost, C.B E., J.P., of Croydon. For outstanding services to the community.

==== Knight Commander of the Order of the British Empire (KBE) ====
- The Right Honourable John Lawson Ormrod Andrews, D.L. For political and public services in Northern Ireland.
- Professor Cyril Astley Clarke, C.B.E., F.R.S., President, Royal College of Physicians of London.
- The Right Honourable Laurence Michael Harvey, Earl of Rosse, M.B.E. For services to the arts.
- Acting Air Marshal Reginald Edward Wynyard Harland, C.B, Royal Air Force.
- William Western Greaves, C.B.E. For services to the British community in Argentina.
- Colonel Hugh Richard Deare Oldman, O.B.E., M.C., lately Defence Secretary, Sultanate of Oman.

==== Commander of the Order of the British Empire (CBE) ====
Military Division

Royal Navy

- Superintendent Miss Joan Cole, O B.E., Women's Royal Naval Service.
- Captain James Edward Campbell Kennon, O.B.E., Royal Navy.
- Captain Iorwerth Bonner Roberts, Royal Fleet Auxiliary Service.
- Captain Roi Egerton Wilson, D.F.C, Royal Navy.

Army

- Brigadier Toby St. George Caulfeild, M.B.E. (85504), late Royal Regiment of Artillery.
- Brigadier John Charles Clinch (212330), late Royal Corps of Signals.
- Colonel Thomas Alexander Gibson, M.B.E. (380091), late Infantry.
- Colonel (Acting) Michael John Harbage, O.B.E., M.C. (345097), The Royal Regiment of Fusiliers.
- Major-General Hugh Crozier Jeffrey, M.B., F.R.C.P. (Edin) (78767), Queen's Honorary Surgeon, late Royal Army Medical Corps.
- Brigadier (Acting) Harold Leonard Guy Livingston, E.R.D. (68664), late Royal Regiment of Artillery, now R.A.R.O.
- Colonel Reginald George Edwin Tibble (352481), late Corps of Royal Electrical and Mechanical Engineers.
- Colonel Courtenay Ernest Welch, M.C. (379637), late Infantry.

Royal Air Force

- Air Commodore Harold Montague Shephard, O.B.E., Royal Air Force.
- Air Commodore Brian Gerald Tivy Stanbridge, M.V.O., A.F.C., A.D.C., Royal Air Force.
- Air Commodore Daniel John Walliker, Royal Air Force.
- Acting Air Commodore John Gilbert Matthews, A.F.C., Royal Air Force.
- Group Captain Robert John Carson, A.F.C., Royal Air Force.
- Group Captain Joseph Alfred Gilbert, Royal Air Force.
- Group Captain Walter John Ives, Royal Air Force.

Civil Division

- Kenneth Alexander Baird, Principal, Nottingham College of Education.
- Colin Lewis Gilbert Baker, lately chairman, Dunlop Angus Industrial Group. For services to Export.
- Claude Cecil Barker, Alderman, Hertfordshire County Council.
- Professor Tibor Barna, Member, Monopolies Commission.
- John Walter Baxter, Senior Partner, G Maunsell & Partners Consulting Engineers.
- Terence Norman Beckett, managing director, Ford Motor Company Ltd., formerly a vice president, Ford of Europe. For services to Export.
- George Harry Beeby, chairman, Inveresk Research International. For services to' Industry.
- Charles John Michael Bennett, lately deputy chairman, Commonwealth Development Corporation and lately Member, Economic Development Committee for Chemicals.
- Stephen Frederic Bennett, lately chairman, British Timken.
- George Cromarty Bloom, General Manager and Chief Executive, Press Association Ltd.
- Frederick Ernest Bonner, Member, Central Electricity Generating Board.
- John McFarlane Boyd, Member, Executive Council, Amalgamated Union of Engineering Workers.
- Edmund Urquhart Broadbent, Director, John Laing and Son Ltd.
- Stuart Burge, Director, Nottingham Playhouse.
- Lionel John Burrows, lately Chief Inspector of Schools, Department of Education and Science.
- Kenneth Hotham Cadbury, M.C., Senior Director, Planning and Purchasing, Telecommunications, Post Office.
- Brian Apcar Carlisle, D.S.C., Regional Co-ordinator (Middle East), Shell International Petroleum Company Ltd.
- Peter Hugh Girard Chamberlin, Partner, Chamberlin, Powell and Bon, Architects.
- Robert Charlton, O.B.E. For services to Association Football.
- John Arthur Chatterton, Clerk to the Leicestershire County Council.
- Christopher William Clayson, O.B.E., chairman, Scottish Council for Postgraduate Medical Education.
- Robert Cox, M.B.E., Consultant Surgeon to the Army.
- Douglas Duncan Simpson Craib, Governor, North of Scotland College of Agriculture.
- Arthur Cross, Vice-chairman, Redifon Ltd. For services to Export.
- Miss Constance Cummings (Mrs. Levy), Actress.
- John Philip William Dankworth. For services to music.
- Kenneth Frederick Grace Day, O.B.E., Clerk of the Birmingham Executive Council.
- Professor Eric James Denton, F.R.S., Marine Biologist and Physiologist.
- William Edward Egner, Headmaster, South Shields Grammar Technical School for Boys.
- Robin Jamieson Elles, O.B.E., chairman, National Youth Employment Council,
- John Innes Elliott, Chief Architect and Surveyor, Metropolitan Police.
- Thomas Russell Fairgrieve, T.D. For political and public services in Scotland.
- John Field, lately Assistant Comptroller, Patent Office, Department of Trade and Industry.
- Myers Foggin, Principal, Trinity College of Music, London.
- Frank James Fowler, O.B.E, T.D., Regional Medical Officer, Yorkshire Regional Health Authority.
- Donald Gordon Frampton. For services to horticulture.
- John Leslie Garton, M.B.E., President, Amateur Rowing Association.
- James Haydon Wood Glen, chief executive officer and Town Clerk, Kingston-upon-Hull City Council.
- Janet Reaveley Glover, Headmistress, Sutton High School for Girls.
- John Patrick Riversdale Glyn, chairman, Agricultural Mortgage Corporation Ltd.
- Sir Derek Burdick Greenaway, Bt., T.D., D.L. For political and public services in London.
- Ellis Norman Gummer, O.B.E., Assistant Director-General (Administration) British Council.
- Nicholas Geoffrey Lempriere Hammond, D.S.O., D.L., lately Professor of Greek, University of Bristol.
- William Hodkinson, O.B.E., chairman, North West Region, British Gas Corporation.
- Bernard William Hodlin, lately Deputy Chief Scientific Officer, Ministry of Defence.
- Maurice Ingram, lately Director, Agricultural Research Council, Meat Research Institute, Langford, Bristol.
- Donald Johnstone, Alderman, Birmingham City Council.
- Henry Arthur Jones, Vaughan Professor of Education, University of Leicester.
- James listen Jones, O.B.E., Chief Electoral Officer for Northern Ireland.
- Thomas Jones, O.B.E., lately Secretary for Wales, Transport and General Workers' Union.
- Harry Judge, Q.F.S.M., Commandant, Fire Service Technical College.
- Arthur Katz, O.B.E., deputy chairman, Mettoy Company Ltd. For services to Export.
- James Duncan Kennedy, County Clerk, Stirling County Council.
- Egon Hynek Kodicek, F.R.S., lately Director, Medical Research Council, Dunn Nutritional Laboratory.
- Robert Newman Preston Lewin, Assistant Secretary, Northern Ireland Office.
- James Lindsay, lately chairman, Cake and Biscuit Alliance Ltd. For services to Export.
- Albert Walter Lines, Director, Engineering and Nuclear Physics Divisions, Science Research Council.
- The Right Honourable Elizabeth, Countess of Longford, Author.
- Alan Charles Mackerras, musical director, Sadler's Wells Opera.
- James Kidd McLellan, Q.P.M, Chief Constable, Lanarkshire Constabulary.
- Thomas Henry Markland. For political services in Lancashire.
- Winifred Rachel, Mrs Mathias, lately Alderman, Cardiff City Council.
- Gordon Richards Matthews. For political and public services in the Midlands.
- Richard Edward Millard, Clerk to the Buckinghamshire County Council.
- Herbert Morley, managing director, General Steels Division, British Steel Corporation.
- Hugh Smith Nelson, President, Scottish Football Association Ltd.
- The Right Honourable Oswald Constantine John, Marquis of Normanby, M.B.E., chairman, Board of Governors, King's College Hospital, London.
- Bernard John O'Kane, chairman, Marconi-Elliott Avionic Systems Ltd.
- Sydney Macdonald Wodehouse Parker, lately Director of Engineering and Group Development, Automotive Products Company Ltd.
- Emily Winifred, Mrs. Parsons. For public services in Cambridgeshire.
- Ralph Warren Peacock. For services to the City of London.
- Frederick Derwent Pickering. For political and public services in Wessex.
- Cecil Millar Porter, Deputy Chief Inspector, Board of Customs and Excise.
- Miss Dilys Powell (Elizabeth Dilys, Mrs. Russell), 'Film Critic, The Sunday Times.
- Richard Power Roberts, chairman, Central Transport Consultative Committee for Great Britain.
- Colonel John Richard Hugh Robertson, O.B.E., lately Chief Inspecting Officer of Railways, Department of the Environment.
- Bernard Francis William Scott, T.D., managing director and deputy chairman, Joseph Lucas (Industries) Ltd. For services to Export.
- Dennis Frederick Shaw, chairman, Police Scientific Development Committee, Home Office Scientific Advisory Council.
- Colonel Edgar Donald Reid Shearer, O.B.E., T.D., D.L., chairman, Northern Ireland Territorial Auxiliary and Volunteer Reserve Association.
- Jack Sydney Sheppard, O.B.E., Crown Estate Mineral Agent.
- Hermann Simon, chairman and Joint Managing Director, Evode Holdings Ltd. For services to Export.
- Ronald Sidney Skerman. For services to the insurance industry.
- Colin Diapre Smith, Assistant Secretary, Scottish Office.
- Walter Mervyn Wadham-Smith, Assistant Solicitor, Ministry of Agriculture, Fisheries and Food.
- Joanna Ravenscroft, Mrs. Spicer, O.B.E., Assistant Controller, Television Development, British Broadcasting Corporation.
- Walter Stansfield M.C., Q.P.M., Chief Constable, Derby County and Borough Constabulary.
- Commander Frederick Ralph Holland Swann, O.B.E., chairman, Committee of Management, Royal National Lifeboat Institution.
- Colonel John Houston Taylor T.D., D.L., Chief Education Officer, Leeds.
- Ernest Cecil Tetsall, chairman, Ipswich Dock Commission.
- David Eyron Thomas, Assistant Secretary, Department of Health and Social Security.
- Geoffrey Harold Tovey, Director, Tissue Typing, Blood Transfusion and Organ Matching Services, Bristol.
- Harold Horsfall Turner, Secretary-General, The Law Society.
- Trevor Alfred Walden, Director, City of Glasgow Museum and Art Gallery.
- Professor Basil Charles Leicester Weedon, FR.S., chairman, Food Additives and Contaminants Committee. For services to food safety.
- Charles Weiss, Senior Partner, Charles Weiss and Partners.
- Allan George Williams Whitfield, Professor of Medicine, University of Birmingham.
- William Edward Woolley, chairman, Blackburn and District Hospital Management Committee.
- Fred Wrigley, lately deputy chairman, Wellcome Foundation Ltd.

==== Officer of the Order of the British Empire (OBE) ====
Military Division

Royal Navy

- Lieutenant Colonel Daniel Black, V.R.D.,* Royal Marines Reserve.
- Surgeon Commander Norman James Blacklock, Royal Navy.
- The Reverend Percy John Burgoyne, Q.H.C., Royal Navy.
- Commander John Spencer Cooper, Royal Navy.
- Acting Captain St. John Hamilton Herbert, Royal Navy.
- Commander William Hector Marquis Mackilliigin, Royal Navy.
- Commander William John Maggs, Royal Navy.
- Commander Jack William Edward Moreton, Royal Navy.
- Commander Ronald Walter Nickson, Royal Navy.
- Commander Peter Bramley Reynolds, Royal Navy.
- Commander William Richard Scott Thomas, Royal Navy.

Army

- Lieutenant-Colonel Giles Alexander Allan (411875), Irish Guards.
- Lieutenant-Colonel John Anthony Clent Bird (376458), The Queen's Lancashire Regiment.
- Lieutenant-Colonel John Samuel Greene Blair, T.D., M.B., F.R.C.S. (425811), Royal Army Medical Corps, Territorial and Army Volunteer Reserve.
- Lieutenant-Colonel Robert Sidney Blewett, M.B. (446840), Royal Army Medical Corps.
- Lieutenant-Colonel Bernard George Crowe (430278), Royal Regiment of Artillery.
- Lieutenant-Colonel Gordon Arthur William Hickman (417382), Royal Corps of Signals.
- Lieutenant-Colonel John Hedley Hooper (418295), Corps of Royal Engineers.
- Lieutenant-Colonel Nigel Bedingfield Knocker (410272), The Queen's Regiment.
- Lieutenant-Colonel Martin Shaun Lee-Browne, T.D. (421519), Wessex Regiment, Territorial and Army Volunteer Reserve.
- Lieutenant-Colonel (now Colonel) John Philip Lloyd, T.D. (420747), The Royal Welch Fusiliers, Territorial and Army Volunteer Reserve.
- Lieutenant-Colonel Donald Jolliffe London (364097), Corps of Royal Engineers.
- Lieutenant-Colonel Mervyn Noel Samuel McCord, M.C. (407952), The Royal Irish Rangers (27th (Inniskilling) 83rd and 87th).
- Lieutenant-Colonel Michael Bywater McNabb, M.B.E. (117906), The Royal Scots (The Royal Regiment).
- Lieutenant-Colonel John Simon Fendall Murray (383852), 15th/19th The King's Royal Hussars.
- Lieutenant-Colonel Henry Colin Barry Overbury (444708), Army Legal Services Staff.
- Lieutenant-Colonel Charles Patrick Ralph Palmer (430407), The Argyll and Sutherland Highlanders (Princess Louise's).
- Lieutenant-Colonel David John Ramsbotham (427439), The Royal Green Jackets.
- Lieutenant-Colonel (Acting) Alexander Bernard Robertson (299592), Army Cadet Force.
- Lieutenant-Colonel (Acting) Eric Smith (280302), Army Cadet Force.
- Lieutenant-Colonel Hubert Roy Wright (158281), Royal Army Educational Corps.

Royal Air Force

- Wing Commander Robert Dennis Alexander, A.F.C. (1333627), Royal Air Force.
- Wing Commander Bertram Brooke (79035), Royal Air Force.
- Wing Commander Derek Thomas Bryant (2552398), Royal Air Force.
- Wing Commander Geoffrey John Charles Claridge (3118831), Royal Air Force.
- Wing Commander William Noel Gilmer, A.F.C. 182613), Royal Air Force.
- Wing Commander (now Group Captain) Alan John Hume (3130602), Royal Air Force.
- Wing Commander Leonard Stanley Laughton (119209), Royal Air Force (Retired).
- Wing Commander Edgar Francis Le Conte (149330), Royal Air Force.
- Wing Commander Alec John Leggett (583273), Royal Air Force.
- Wing Commander Ralph Lewis Mills (573326) Royal Air Force.
- Wing Commander Sidney Albert Ernest Munns, D.F.M. (116154), Royal Air Force.
- Wing Commander Ernest Toole (59114), Royal Air Force.
- Wing Commander Edward Peter Wildy (193416), Royal Air Force.

Civil Division

- George Stirk Adams, T.D., General Practitioner Ashford, Middlesex.
- Ralph Henry Thomas Alexander, managing director, General Electric Company Overseas Services Ltd. For services to export.
- Ernest Allday, Q.F.S.M., Assistant Chief Officer, London Fire Brigade.
- Russell James Laurence Allen, chairman, Council of the British Industrial Biological Research Association.
- Thomas Nutter Allen, M.C., T.D., assistant director of Studies, Royal Military Academy, Sandhurst, Ministry of Defence.
- Ralph Downs Appleton, T.D, lately deputy chairman, Aycliffe and Peterlee Development Corporations.
- William George James Appleton, lately Joint Deputy Managing Director, Stein Atkinson Stordy Ltd.
- Albert Ashforth, Head of Sales and Installation Division, Telecommunications Marketing Department, Post Office.
- James Priestley Aspden, Town Clerk, Warrington County Borough Council.
- Cyril Stanley Aynsley, lately Chief Reporter, Daily Express.
- Leslie Henry Baines, For services to local government and to National Savings in the Isle of Wight.
- Paul Balint, chairman, Gunson's Sortex Ltd. For services to export.
- Reginald Samuel Ball, Director of Education, Harrow.
- Douglas John Barrington, managing director, Lygon Arms Ltd., Broadway, Worcestershire.
- Sydney Hector Bell, deputy director and Secretary, The Paint Research Association.
- Charles Edward Bellairs, M.B.E. For political services.
- Major Roland Cecil Bellamy, T.D., D.L. For services to the magistracy in Grimsby.
- James Frederick Bereen, Consultant Anaesthetist, Royal Victoria Hospital, Belfast.
- Henry Crombie Beveridge. For political services in Glasgow.
- John Almond Rowland Blackman, Chief Administrative Officer, County Councils Association.
- Alan Blaney, Principal, Board of Inland Revenue.
- Miss Eleanor Milford Booker, M.B.E., Foreign and Commonwealth Office.
- Eric Simpson Booth, Director, Wool (and Allied) Textile Employers' Council.
- Harold Bridges, Founder, Harold Bridges' Charitable Foundation.
- Miss Anne Hayes Court Brown, Chief Regional' Nursing Officer, Western Regional Hospital Board, Scotland.
- George Mackay Brown, Author.
- Alfred Edward Brownjohn, Clerk to the Dental Estimates Board for England and Wales.
- Jennet, The Honourable Mrs. Bruce, County President, British Red Cross Society, Sutherland.
- Joseph Burgess, lately Registrar and Secretary, University of Manchester Institute of Science and Technology.
- Norman Charles Henry Burtenshaw, Football Referee.
- Francis Henry Busby, lately Town Clerk, Eastbourne County Borough Council.
- Douglas Cameron, Cellist.
- Frank Caplin, Technical Adviser to the Board of Racal-British Communications Corporation Ltd. For services to export.
- Gordon Garrington Shaw Chambers, Governor, Grade I, Prison Department, Home Office.
- Miss Mollie Clarke, Senior Adviser for Infant and Nursery Education in Devon
- Stanley George Gurney Clarke, chairman and managing director, Courier Press (Holdings) Ltd.
- James William Clayphan, Technical Adviser, Ministry of Defence.
- Colonel Aymar Sinclair Joseph de Satge Clayton, D.L., Secretary, East Anglian Territorial Auxiliary and Volunteer Reserve Association.
- Albert Percival Coldrick, lately General Secretary, Transport Salaried Staffs' Association.
- Miss Margaret Lilian Collins, Chief Social Development Officer, Runcorn Development Corporation.
- Constance Margaret, Mrs. Cornell, Independent Member, Agricultural Wages Board for England and Wales.
- John Harman Corner, lately Headmaster, Vanburgh Castle School, Royal Air Force Benevolent Fund.
- Robert Hudson Coulman, chairman, Yorkshire River Authority.
- James Robertson Cowan, Director, Scottish Area, National Coal Board.
- John Russell Coward, Director, Notting Hill Housing Trust.
- Stanley Craigs, General Manager, Carrickfergus, Courtaulds Ltd.
- Walter Crossland, Director and General Manager, Portex Ltd., Hythe, Kent.
- Edwin Norman Crowe, Member, Legislative Council of the Isle of Man.
- Stanley Herbert Dainty, T.D, Director, Department of Public Health Engineering, Greater London Council.
- David Earsman Dalzell, Q P M., Deputy Chief Constable, Liverpool and Bootle Constabulary.
- Lieutenant-Colonel Joseph Jacob Davis T.D., D.L., For political and public services in Wales.
- Arthur Dawson, Regional Secretary, Yorkshire and North Derbyshire Region, General and Municipal Workers' Union.
- Jacquelin, Mrs. Dean. For political and public services in Eastern England.
- Albert Edward De Barr, Director of Research, The Machine Tool Industry Research Association.
- Stuart Douglas, T.D., Director, British Man-Made Fibres Federation.
- James Drury, Manager, Electronic Systems Department, Edinburgh, Ferranti Ltd.
- Frederick Weir Dunning, Curator, The Geological Museum.
- Harry Earnshaw. For political and public services in Yorkshire.
- Kenneth Charles Easton, General Practitioner, Richmond, Yorkshire.
- Campbell William Edwards, Director, Bridport-Gundry (Holdings) Ltd. For services to export.
- Ernest Andrew Sommerville Faulds. For political services in Eastern England.
- Hugh Robert Featherstone, Director, Freight Transport Association Ltd.
- James Graham Fulton. For services to the Scottish fishing industry.
- Thomas Gannon, Headmaster, Milefield Middle School, Barnsley.
- Edward John Oliver Gardiner, lately Deputy Secretary, Association of Municipal Corporations.
- Walter William Garwood, Superintending Architect, Department of Health and Social Security.
- John Rhodolph Glen, lately Headmaster, Swarchffe Middle School, Leeds.
- Major Thomas William Gracey, D.L., Commander, St. John Ambulance Brigade, and Commissioner, East, South and North Devon.
- Allan Wallace Grant, M.C., T.D., managing director, Ecclesiastical Insurance Office Ltd.
- Brigadier Reginald Wilfred Hackett, lately Chair- man, General Committee, Royal Army Pay Corps Regimental Association.
- Bernard Neil Halliday, Deputy Assistant Commissioner, Metropolitan Police.
- Leslie John Pyke Halstead, Principal Architect, Department of Education and Science.
- John Harrison, lately Regional Microbiologist, Ministry of Agriculture, Fisheries and Food.
- The Reverend Joseph Benson Harrison, General Secretary, Church of England Council for Social Aid,
- Leonard Ernest Hart. For political and public services in the South East.
- Hugh Hazlett, lately Staff Inspector, Ministry of Education for Northern Ireland.
- Harry Robert Hearn, Head of Aerosol Division, The Metal Box Company Ltd.
- Louie Ellen, Mrs. Henson, Honorary Alderman, Leeds City Council.
- James Herbert, lately Headmaster, Sir Wilfrid Martineau School, Birmingham.
- Mary Dixon, Mrs. Sainsbury-Hicks (Mary Wilson), lately Staff Inspector for Special Education (Inner London Education Authority).
- Walter Higgins, Headmaster, Manor High School, Oadby, Leicester.
- Frank Alfred Hodges, Eastern Regional Member, National Savings Committee.
- Bernarr Eugen Hopkins, Senior Principal Scientific Officer, National Physical Laboratory, Department of Trade and Industry.
- Miss Florence Edna Houghton, lately Director of Nursing Services, Somerset County Council.
- Leonard Arthur Howes. For services to the community in Norwich.
- Thomas Thompson Hubble, M.B.E. For political and public services in the North of England.
- Geoffrey Arthur Hughes, lately Superintending Quantity Surveyor, Department of the Environment.
- Miss Daisy Deborah Hyams (Mrs. Hart), managing director, Tesco Stores (Wholesale) Ltd. For services to the food trade.
- William Gregory Ibberson, chairman, George Ibberson and Company Ltd. For services to the cutlery industry.
- Miss Sylvia Alexandra Jacobs, Principal, Board of Customs and Excise.
- Rees Henley James, Music Adviser, Herefordshire Education Committee.
- William Jeffrey, Principal, Donaldson's School for the Deaf, Edinburgh.
- William Alan Jenkins, chairman, Board of Visitors, H.M. Prison, Wakefield.
- Evan Trefor Jones For services to the Royal British Legion.
- Gwilym Murray Jones, M.B.E., General Practitioner, Caerphilly, Glamorgan.
- John Emlyn Jones, Treasurer, Manchester Regional Hospital Board.
- Alex Peter Josephides, Superintending Architect. Property Services Agency, Department of the Environment.
- James Reid Kelso, Q.P.M., Deputy Chief Constable, City of Glasgow Police.
- Thomas Kilvington, deputy director of Radio Technology, Ministry of Posts and Telecommunications
- Arthur Tracy Lambert, Director, R H Thompson and Company Ltd.
- Alan John Le Brun, Chief Immigration Officer, Jersey.
- Cyril John Lindsey, T, D. For political services.
- Eric Albert Lovegrove, Postmaster Controller, Eastern Central and Foreign Section, London Postal Region, Post Office.
- Douglas Dean Lovell, T.D For political and public services in the West of England.
- Katharine, Mrs. Lowe. For services to the community in Manchester.
- Ernest McDonnell, Headmaster, Birley High School, Manchester.
- Gerald McGuire, National Countryside and Education Officer, Youth Hostels Association (England and Wales).
- Alexander McIntosh, Town Clerk, Motherwell and Wishaw.
- Joseph Shanks McLean, lately Head of Department of Chemistry, Paisley College of Technology.
- Michael McLuskey, Director, Beck and Contracts Ltd. For services to Export.
- George McRiner, D.F.C., Operations Grade I (Commandant), Civil Aviation Authority.
- James Lionel Manning, Sports writer and broadcaster.
- George William Mantle, Assistant Secretary, Department for National Savings.
- Harold Mark, Principal, Lord Chancellor's Department.
- Michael Robert Matthews, Member, Economic Development Committee for the Hotels and Catering Industry.
- Alistair Francis Macleod Matthews, Assistant General Manager (Fields Co-ordmator), British Petroleum Company Ltd.
- Richard John Hannay Meade. For services to Riding.
- John Mitchell, Editor/Manager and Director, Craven Herald Ltd, Skipton, Yorkshire.
- Tom Noel Mitchell, Regional Architect, Liver- pool Regional Hospital Board.
- William Burrell Alan Mitchell, lately chairman, The Savings Bank of Glasgow.
- Richard Edward Moira, Partner, Moira and Moira, Architects, Edinburgh.
- John Glaister Morrison, Q.P.M., Deputy Chief Constable, Birmingham City Police.
- Elizabeth Gwendolen, Mrs. Mullins. For services to the Gwen Mullins Trust.
- Christopher Needham. For services to the British Standards Institution.
- John Hugh Nicholl, Vice-chairman, former Londonderry County Council.
- Miss Ann Gould Notman, lately Chief Nursing Officer, Plymouth and District Hospital Management Committee.
- Hubert Culliford Palin, General Practitioner, Burnley, Lancashire.
- Richard Henry Pamplin, Secretary, Staff Side, Police Council for the United Kingdom.
- Jonathan Cyril Park. For services to the National Health Service.
- Robert Benton Peacock, lately chairman, High Mowthorpe Experimental Husbandry Farm Advisory Committee.
- Alexander Philip, General Manager, Scottish Region, British Railways Board.
- Herbert Reginald Poole, Chief Executive, Liverpool Council of Social Service.
- Miss Mary Powell, Principal Nursing Officer, Robert Jones and Agnes Hunt Orthopaedic Hospital, Oswestry, Shropshire.
- John Anthony Price, County Planning Officer, Pembrokeshire.
- Robert Beverlin Price, Member, former Urban District Council, Ballymoney, County Antrim.
- William McKay Rae, managing director, Radar and Equipment Division, Electrical Musical Industries Electronics Ltd.
- Frank Reginald Reeves, Director of Education, King Edward's Hospital Fund for London.
- George Overton Richards, Secretary, University of Leeds Institute of Education.
- James Taylor Robertson, Member, Scottish Air Cadet Council.
- Leslie Alexander Robertson, lately deputy director of Social Services, City of Westminster.
- Thomas Robertson, Senior Inspector (Horticulture), Department of Agriculture and Fisheries for Scotland.
- Thomas Bernard Robinson, Secretary, The Marie Curie Memorial Foundation.
- Michael James Rogers, Chief Executive, Lloyd's Common Market Secretariat. For services to Export.
- John Douglas Rothery, M.B.E, Senior Principal, Ministry of Defence.
- Alec William Alfred Rundle, lately Chairman (Executive), A Gallenkamp and Company Ltd. For services to Export.
- Lieutenant-Colonel Rudyard Holt Russell, President, Amateur International Boxing Association.
- Hugh Sanders, Principal Probation Officer, Sheffield.
- John Stuart Sansom, Technical Controller, Thames Television Ltd
- Tom Scott, Principal Careers Officer, Denbighshire Education Authority
- William Scott, Clerk to the Teesside Justices.
- John Sewell. For services to the European Atlantic Movement.
- Philip Hooper Sewell, Library Adviser, Department of Education and Science.
- William Arthur Seymour, assistant director, Ordnance Survey, Department of the Environment.
- Norman William Sharp, General Manager, Munich Office, Turbo-Union Ltd, Rolls-Royce (1971) Ltd., Bristol Engine Division.
- Miss Hilda Marjorie Simpson, Principal Nursing Officer (Research), Department of Health and Social Security.
- Gordon Archbold Slater. For services to music in Lincoln.
- Esme Jane Watson, Mrs. Smail, lately President, Dundee, Soldiers', Sailors' and Airmen's Families Association.
- Miss Sarah Colman Small, Foreign and Common- wealth Office.
- George Stewart Smith, chairman, Exeter and Mid Devon Hospital Management Committee.
- Gertrude, Mrs. Smith, Psychiatiic Social Worker in Wiltshire.
- Lieutenant-Colonel Kenneth Campbell Cory Smith, D.O. For services to social welfare in Northern Ireland.
- Leslie Harold Smith, T D, D. L., General Manager, Leicester City Transport.
- Robin Neville Smith, M C., T.D., Director, Queen Elizabeth's Foundation for the Disabled.
- John Ranald Stainer, Registrar of the Royal College of Music.
- Eric Pemble Stevens, M.B.E., Works Manager, Martin Baker Aircraft Company Ltd.
- John Stoker, Town Clerk, Wallsend Borough Council.
- Eric Geoffrey Taylor. For political and public services in Lancashire.
- Rodney Leon Taylor, Principal, Science Research Council.
- Miss Alison Margaret Tennant. For public services.
- William Risk Thomson, County Surveyor and Bridgemaster, Worcestershire County Council.
- Alan Jeffrey Tomsett, Financial Controller, British Transport Docks Board.
- Hubert Harold Tranter, H.M. Deputy Superintending Inspector of Factories, Midlands (Nottingham) Division, Department of Employment.
- Miss Nora May Turner, M.B.E., lately Principal, Department of Trade and Industry.
- Joseph John Vickers, Farmer and Auctioneer, County Durham. For services to agriculture.
- Reginald Wailes. For services to Industrial Archaeology.
- Frank Raphael Waley, M.C., Member, Advisory Committee on the Landscape Treatment of Trunk Roads.
- Alexander Stewart Warren, D. L., Councillor, Glasgow Town Council.
- Captain Ronald Owen Edwick Webb, Senior Ship Manager, Esso Petroleum Company Ltd.
- Stephen Frederick Wheatcroft, Member, Economic Development Committee for the Movement of Exports.
- Edward Frederick Wheeler. For political services.
- Sydney Coe-Gunnell White, managing director, B.R.S. Parcels Ltd.
- William Clark Whiteford, Chairman of the Advisory Committee on Agricultural Education of the West Midlands Advisory Council for Further Education.
- Geoffrey Whitehouse, Production Director, Wickman Wimet Ltd.
- Scovell Frederick Charles Whitmore, deputy chairman, South Western Electricity Board.
- Martin Matthew Whittet, Physician Superintendent, Craig Dunain Hospital, Inverness.
- Norman Ewart Wiggins. Chairman, Kensington and Chelsea Rent Tribunal.
- Michael George Wilde, Project Director (Concorde), Commercial Aircraft Division, British Aircraft Corporation Ltd.
- John Wilkinson, Director, Westmorland Branch, British Red Cross Society.
- Walter James Philipps Williams, chairman, Haverfordwest Supplementary Benefits Appeals Tribunal.
- William David Wills. For services to disabled children.
- Alan Wilson, Principal Professional and Technology Officer, Ministry of Defence.
- William Frank Wood, Head of Research Reactors Division, Harwell, United Kingdom Atomic Energy Authority
- Joseph Leslie Wright, M.B.E, Principal, Cabinet Office.
- Howard John Yallop, lately Principal Scientific Officer, Royal Armament Research and Development Establishment, Ministry of Defence.
- John Alexander Young, Town Solicitor, Belfast City Council.
- Andrew Zinovieff, chairman, Durham and District Disablement Advisory Committee.

Diplomatic Service and Overseas List

- Arthur Andrews. For services to British commercial interests in Bahrain.
- Miss Sally Aw Siah. For services to the community in Hong Kong.
- Edward James Bailey. For services to British com- mercial interests and the British community in Ghana.
- David Gourlay Barr, H.M. Consul-General, Honolulu.
- Henry Thomson Beattie, M.B.E. For services to the British community in Assam, India.
- Frederick Alexander Bell. For services to the British community in Peru.
- John MacBain Chisholm Bisset. For services to the advancement of leprosy control in Thailand.
- Edward Frank Brewer, M.B.E., Forestry Development Officer, Government of The Gambia.
- Eric George Keith Challenger, M.B.E., Permanent Secretary, Office of External Affairs and Defence, Antigua.
- Winifred Henrietta, Mrs. Coaker, M.B.E. For welfare services to children in Lesotho.
- Arved Colvin-Smith, lately Lecturer in English at the University of Hamburg.
- Hunter Ralston Crawford. For services to the rubber industry and the British community in Malaysia.
- Eric Byran Cumine. For public services in Hong Kong.
- James Innes Maclear Dempster. For services to civil engineering in Indonesia.
- Professor Friderica Derra de Moroda. For services to Anglo-Austrian relations.
- Joseph Francis Marie John Devaux. For services to the community and commerce in St. Lucia.
- Miss Elizabeth Dobbie. For services to nursing in Iran.
- Cyril Reginald James Donnithorne, lately Director of Building Development, Public Works Department, Hong Kong.
- George Edward Doughty, lately Deputy Engineer in Chief, East African Posts and Telecommunications Service.
- Thomas Edmund Dowd. For services to British commercial interests and the British community in Chile.
- Major Thomas Frederick Ellis, MBE. For services to the British community in Uganda.
- Patrick David Cameron Fleming. For services to the rice growing industry in Malawi.
- Hugh Moss Gerald Forsgate. For services to the community in Hong Kong.
- Peter John George, lately First Secretary (Commercial), H.M. Embassy, Seoul.
- The Reverend William Gardiner-Scott. For services to the Church and the British community in Jerusalem.
- Charles Robert Giovetti. For services to British commercial interests in Angola.
- Brian William Gordon, lately H.M. Consul-General, Bilbao.
- Alexander Colquhoun Grant. For services to the British community in Lagos.
- William Colin Gray. For services to British commercial interests in Nigeria.Sister Mary McCallum
- Philip Norman Griffin, Government Anaesthetist, Dominica.
- Cecil Harry Griggs. For services to the British community in Cyprus.
- Walter Stopforth Grisdale. For services to education in Ethiopia.
- Douglas Hogg. For services to the British com- munity in New Delhi.
- Roger William Horrell, lately First Secretary, British High Commission, Kampala.
- Alan Edgar Jones. For services to British commercial interests in Portugal.
- Tecwyn Jones, lately Senior Principal Scientific Officer, East African Agricultural Forestry Research Organisation.
- Joseph Michael Jordan. For services as Provident Fund Adviser in the West Indies Associated States.
- Oliver John Keeble. For services to the British community in Uganda.
- Karl Werner Kuhne, lately Director, International Red Locust Control Service in Zambia.
- Thomas Herbert Land, lately First Secretary, H.M. Embassy, Moscow.
- John Lawrence, lately British Council Representative, Zambia.
- Alan Sutherland Leask, Agricultural and Forestry Officer, Department of Agriculture, St Helena.
- John Terence Legg. Fore services to cocoa research and the British community in Ghana.
- John Douglas Levaillant. For services to British commercial interests in Pakistan.
- Daniel Lewis. For services to the British community in Argentina.
- Professor Ursula Mary Lister. For services to medicine in Nigeria.
- Frederick Llambias, M.B.E., Q.P.M., C.P.M., Deputy Commissioner of Police, Gibraltar Police Force.
- Donald James Longman. For services to technical education in the West Indies.
- Sister Mary McCallum. For services to education in Malta.
- John Alastair Romer Macdonald. For services to the British community in Bangladesh.
- Wallace John Mackenzie. For services to British commercial interests in Canada.
- John Joseph Maguire. For services to British commercial interests in Canada.
- Peter Frederick Heppell Mason. For services to banking in Oman.
- Kenneth Ian Matheson. For services to the community in Nicaragua.
- Raymond Clarence Peterson Moore, J.P. For public services in Grenada.
- Arthur Alexander Norrie. For services to the British community in Sabah, Malaysia.
- Ronald George Arthur Parvin, Auditor General, Government of Malawi.
- Thomas William Pedder. For services to British commercial interests and the British community in Chile.
- Ernest Woodward Price. For services in leprosy control in Ethiopia.Elihak
- John Englan Quin. For services to British commercial interests and the British community in São Paulo.
- Ronald Ernest Raby. Postmaster-General, Government of Malawi.
- Thomas Hugh Cecil Raikes. For services to British commercial interests in Japan.
- Edward William Rickett. For services to the British community in Malawi.
- John Linton Rigg. For services to tourism in Grenada.
- Kenneth Ellsworth Robinson, Chief Education Officer, Department of Education, Bermuda.
- Gordon Arthur Roe. For services to commerce in Belize.
- Charles Rule. For services to the British community in Liberia.
- William John Rumble, First Secretary-in-Charge, British High Commission Office, Christchurch.
- Harold Mair Sargisson. For services to British commercial interests and the British community in Madrid.
- Edward Alexander Barton Scott. For services to the British community in Guatemala.
- Ronald Frederick Sharp, lately First Secretary and Consul, H.M. Embassy, Tripoli.
- Ivor Dennis Spicer, Director of Audit, Government of Swaziland.
- Charles Kenyon Squires. For services to British commercial interests and the British community in Stockholm.
- Frederick Herbert Stroud. For services to the British community in West Bengal, India.
- Desmond Harper Taylor, M.B.E., Deputy Permanent Secretary, Government of Lesotho.
- The Reverend Canon John Rowland Taylor. For services to the Church and community in Tanzania.
- Geoffrey Marsh Tingle, lately assistant director, Medical and Health Department, Hong Kong.
- Raymond Kenneth Tongue, British Council language specialist, Singapore.
- Stanley Graham Trees, M.V.O., Financial Secretary, Turks and Caicos Island.
- The Right Reverend Dudley Tuti, Bishop of the Central Solomons, Diocese of Melanesia.
- Elijah Williamson, lately First Secretary, H.M. Embassy, Tokyo.
- Harold William Wynn, lately Director of Posts, Abu Dhabi, United Arab Emirates

==== Member of the Order of the British Empire (MBE) ====
Military Division

Army

- Major Geoffrey John Allen (376784), Royal Regiment of Artillery.
- Major Terence Brian Andrews (386199), 9th/12th Royal Lancers (Prince of Wales's).
- Major John Baskervyle-Clegg (466792), Grenadier Guards.
- 22772198 Warrant Officer Class 2 Ernest Ronald Beard, Royal Army Pay Corps.
- Captain (Quartermaster) James Bertrand (485874) 5th Royal Inniskilling Dragoon Guards.
- Major Arthur Alfred Bull (477183), Royal Army Pay Corps.
- Major Ian Alexander Christie, M.C. (443414), The King's Own Scottish Borderers.
- Major (now Lieutenant-Colonel) Charles Gordon Cornock (451215), Royal Regiment of Artillery.
- 23387555 Warrant Officer Class 2 Robert McCormack Cronie, Royal Army Pay Corps.
- Major (now Lieutenant-Colonel) Anthony Bernard Crowfoot (448944), The Prince of Wales's Own Regiment of Yorkshire.
- Captain (Quartermaster) Walter Thomas Darrell (480001), Corps of Royal Engineers.
- Major (Acting) George Durrand (404563), ArmyCadet Force.
- Major Ronald Dean Fisher (412301), The Queen's Regiment.
- 23522535 Warrant Officer Class 2 James Raymond Galt, The Parachute Regiment, Territorial and Army Volunteer Reserve.
- 222775058 Warrant Officer Class 1 Joseph Henry Grandison, Corps of Military Police (now Discharged).
- Major John Bernard Kelynge Greenway (448973), The Duke of Wellington's Regiment (West Riding)
- 22539994 Warrant Officer Class 2 William Lloyd Griffiths Corps of Royal Military Police.
- Major (Acting) Roy Hammond (480449), Corps of Royal Electrical and Mechanical Engineers.
- Major (Quartermaster) Leonard Frank Horstead (473094), The Royal Regiment of Fusiliers.
- Captain (Riding Master) Alec Jackson (481394), The Life Guards.
- Major Kenneth Wright Jackson, T.D. (473784), Corps of Royal Engineers, Territorial and Army Volunteer Reserve.
- Captain (Ordnance Executive Officer) William Joseph Leckie (478222), Royal Army Ordnance Corps.
- Major Percy John Lee (469348), Royal Regiment of Artillery.
- Major Peter Michael McGuinness (427366), Corps of Royal Electrical and Mechanical Engineers.
- The Reverend Cosmo Alexander Morwood Meldrum, T.D., Chaplain to the Forces, Third Class (402314), Royal Army Chaplains' Department, Territorial and Army Volunteer Reserve.
- Major Kenneth Ernest Muir (426958), Corps of Royal Engineers, now R.A.R.O.
- 3254538 Warrant Officer Class I (Local) James Murray, The King's Own Scottish Borderers.
- 2666439 Warrant Officer Class 1 Kenneth Alfred Mursell, Coldstream Guards.
- Major (Staff Quartermaster) Frederick James Pavey (465895), Royal Corps of Signals.
- 22789135 Warrant Officer Class 1 Herbert Patrick Pennington, The Royal Regiment of Wales.
- Major John Stanley Brian Pollard (418364), The Queen's Regiment.
- Major Anthony Roy Rainbow (429357), The Staffordshire Regiment (The Prince of Wales's).
- 22803518 Warrant Officer Class 2 Harry William Shearing, The Queen's Regiment, Territorial and Army Volunteer Reserve.
- 22709278 Warrant Officer Class 1 George Smith, Royal Army Ordnance Corps.
- Major (Quartermaster) Charles James Stenning (472690), Royal Regiment of Artillery, now R.A.R.O.
- Major (Gurkha Commissioned Officer) Henry Daniel Subba (440337), 2nd King Edward VII's Own Gurkha Rifles (The Sirmoor Rifles).
- Major John Richard Turpin (243108), Royal Corps of Signals, now Retired.
- 21063115 Warrant Officer Class 1 (acting) George Edward Veitch, The Royal Anglian Regiment.
- Major (Acting) Charles Gerard Courtenay Vyvyan (484776), The Royal Green Jackets
- Major Horace Reginald Williams (346416), The Royal Regiment of Wales.

=== Order of the Companions of Honour (CH) ===
- The Right Honourable Henry, Baron Cohen of Birkenhead. For services to medicine.
- The Right Honourable Angela Olivia, Countess of Limerick, G.B.E. For services to the International Red Cross.
- The Right Honourable William Stephen Ian Whitelaw, M.C., D.L., M.P. For political and public services.
