= Concert party =

The term Concert Party may mean:

- Concert party (business), a type of business takeover
- Concert party (entertainment), a troupe of popular entertainers, usually travelling
