= Westland affair =

British political scandal

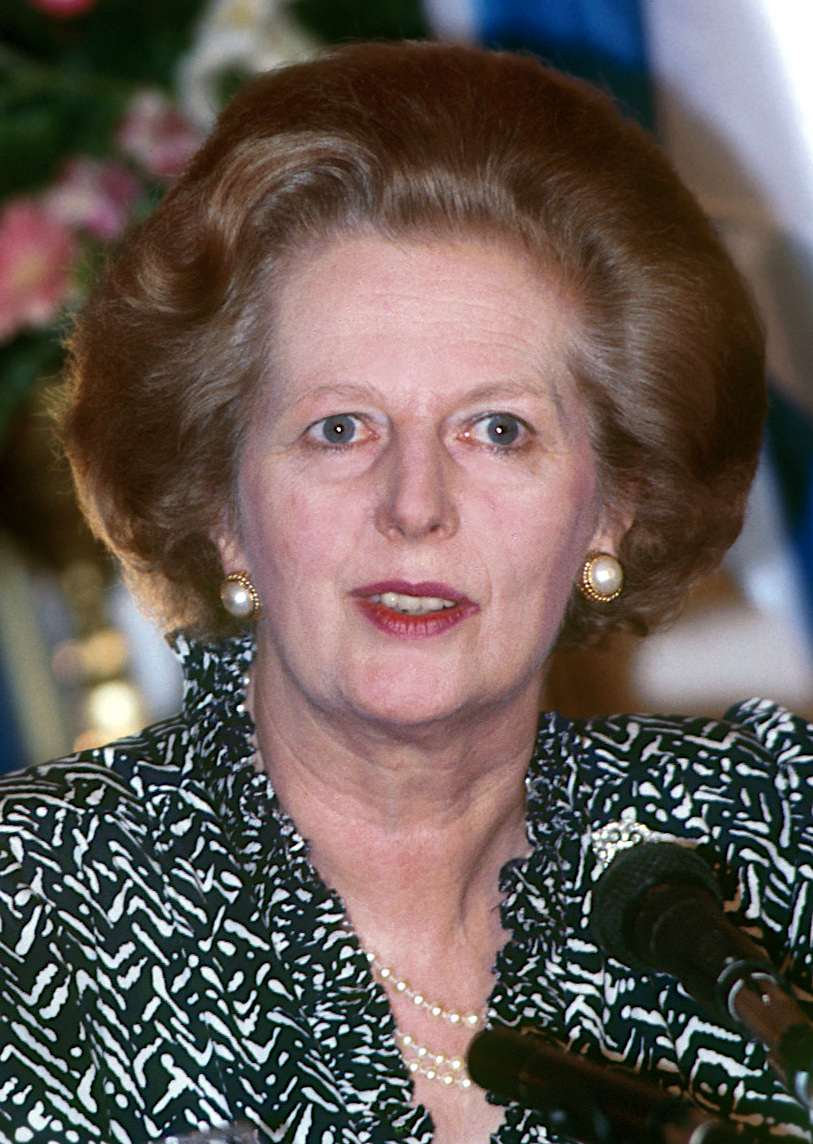
Margaret Thatcher (1986)

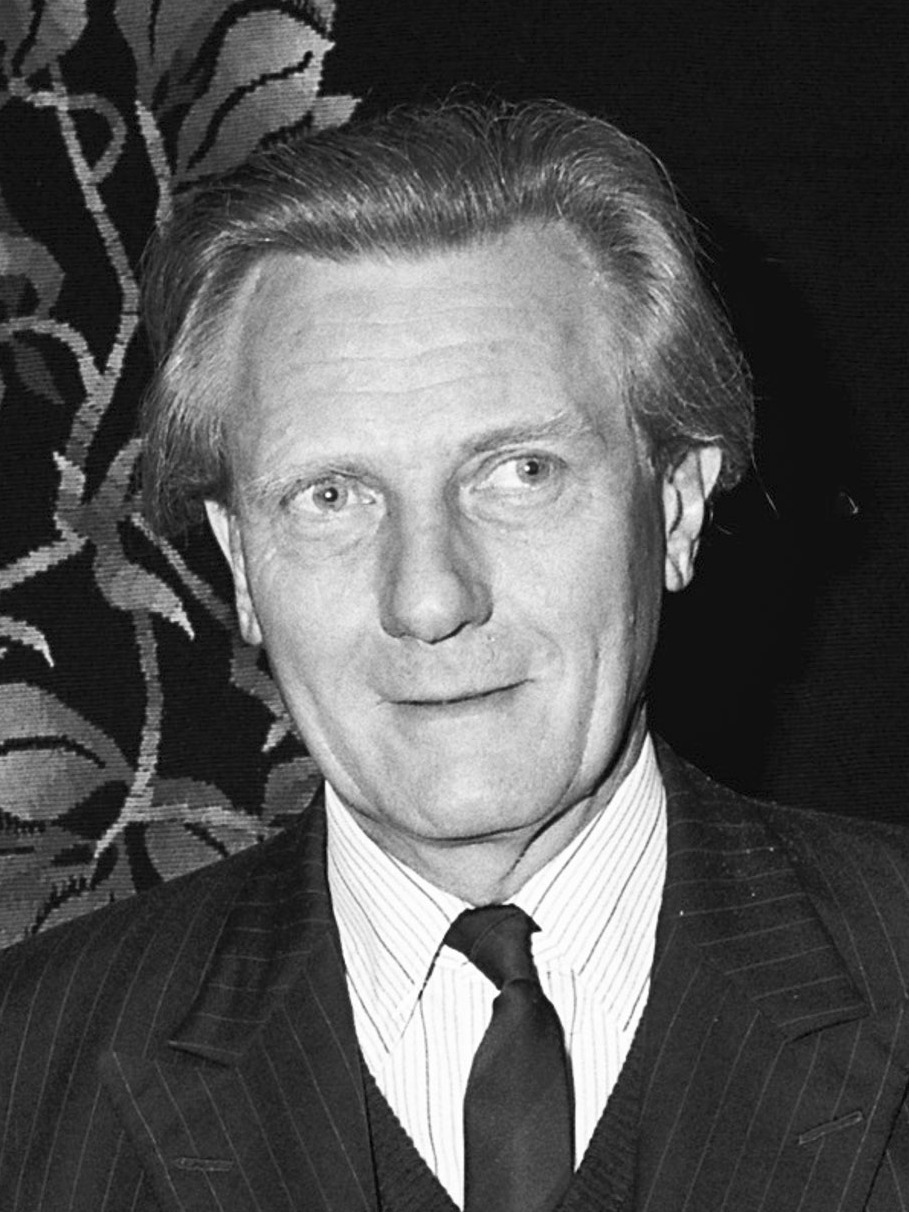
Michael Heseltine (1988)

The Westland affair in 1985–86 was an episode in which Margaret Thatcher, Prime Minister of the United Kingdom, and her Secretary of State for Defence, Michael Heseltine, went public over a cabinet dispute with questions raised about whether the conventions of cabinet government were being observed and about the integrity of senior politicians.

The argument was over the future of Westland Helicopters, Britain's last helicopter manufacturer, which was to be the subject of a rescue bid. The Defence Secretary, Heseltine, favoured a European solution, integrating Westland with a consortium including British Aerospace (BAe), Italian (Agusta) and French companies. Thatcher and Trade and Industry Secretary Leon Brittan, while ostensibly maintaining a neutral stance, wanted to see Westland merge with Sikorsky, an American company.

Heseltine refused to accept Thatcher's choice and claimed that Thatcher had refused to allow a free ministerial discussion of the matter, even suggesting that she had lied about cancelling a scheduled meeting. In January 1986, when he was ordered to cease campaigning for his European consortium, he resigned and walked out of a Cabinet meeting. Brittan was then forced to resign for having ordered the leaking to the press of a confidential legal letter critical of Heseltine, and for his lack of candour to the House of Commons about his efforts to persuade BAe to withdraw from Heseltine's consortium.

Thatcher's survival as Prime Minister briefly appeared in question, but she rode out the crisis. The episode nonetheless was an embarrassment to the Conservative Thatcher government and undermined her reputation.

Heseltine stated that Thatcher had violated constitutional law. He defended his stance, directly after his resignation, in an article published in The Observer. Constitutional historian Peter Hennessy wrote an academic article and subsequently a book about the stance: the effectiveness of the Cabinet system including the changes Margaret Thatcher had made. It later became clear the resignation of Heseltine nearly resulted in the political fall of Thatcher.

== April 1985 ==
The Westland affair originated with Alan Bristow's bid for the company in April 1985. By June, Bristow was threatening to end his bid unless the Government assured him that there would be future orders for the company from the Ministry of Defence and that the repayment of over £40 million of launch aid for Westland's newest helicopter from the Department of Trade and Industry was waived.

Heseltine at this time was uninterested in Westland helicopters when approached by Norman Tebbit, the then Trade and Industry Secretary, as plenty of American helicopters were available to meet Britain's defence requirements. He attended two meetings about the company's future in June 1985, chaired by Thatcher. It was decided that Tebbit should persuade the Bank of England to co-operate with the main creditors in the hope that a recovery plan and new management would end the threat of receivership.

Bristow withdrew his bid and in late June Sir John Cuckney was brought in as chairman of Westland.

== November 1985 ==
Cuckney proposed that a new minority shareholder of 29.9% be introduced to Westland. No British firm was willing, but Sikorsky was interested. Cuckney proposed that Westland merge with United Technologies Corporation, of which the US company Sikorsky was a subsidiary. Heseltine came out against this plan after realising that Westland would probably become responsible for assembling the Sikorsky UH-60 Black Hawk, which the Ministry of Defence would then be under great pressure to buy. He preferred Westland to go into receivership so that British companies GEC and British Aerospace could buy the viable parts of the business.

In mid-October Heseltine suggested a European consortium which would include French Aérospatiale, German MBB and Italian Agusta (Sikorsky was now negotiating a strategic linkup with Italian Fiat). Leon Brittan, who had replaced Tebbit as Trade and Industry Secretary in September 1985, at first urged Thatcher to consider a European option (Heseltine later claimed Brittan preferred this option, although Brittan denied this). The Government was officially neutral (i.e. arguing that it was a matter for Westland directors and shareholders) but by November Heseltine was lobbying hard for the European option.

In late November Peter Levene, Chief of Procurement at the Ministry of Defence, had a meeting at the Ministry with his French, West German and Italian counterparts (the National Armaments Directors or NADs) and the representatives of the consortium, and agreed to "buy European" for certain classes of helicopters. If Westland went ahead with Sikorsky its helicopters, under this new agreement, would be unable to be bought by the four governments. The meeting was later praised by the House of Commons Defence Select Committee. Thatcher, who only learned of the meeting through Cuckney, was displeased, as were Brittan and the Treasury, who thought the US option might be cheaper, although Thatcher and Leon Brittan kept to their official pretence of neutrality.

== December 1985 ==
In early December Thatcher had two ad hoc meetings with Heseltine, Brittan, Tebbit, William Whitelaw (Deputy Prime Minister), Geoffrey Howe (Foreign Secretary) and Nigel Lawson (Chancellor of the Exchequer) on 5 and 6 December. Brittan argued that the NADs' opposition should be set aside, but Howe and Tebbit were not unsympathetic to Heseltine's proposed consortium, and the decision was deferred to the Cabinet Economic Affairs Committee (E(A)) on Monday 9 December 1985. Cuckney and a Westland financial adviser were invited to attend the E(A) meeting. Cuckney said that it was the management's view that the Sikorsky option was the best one. A majority of the E(A) meeting agreed to dismiss the NADs' opposition. Thatcher, who complained that three hours had been spent discussing a company with a market capitalisation of only £30m (a tiny amount in government terms), allowed Heseltine until 4 pm on Friday 13 December to submit a viable proposal for a European deal. He did (with British Aerospace and GEC now part of his consortium), but Westland's directors rejected it and chose Sikorsky. Heseltine had expected that there would be a second meeting of E(A) to discuss his consortium, but no such meeting was called; Thatcher later claimed that the Monday meeting had agreed to leave the decision to Westland to take, but it later emerged that Ridley and Lord Young had placed such a meeting in their diaries and had been told by Number Ten that it had been cancelled. Heseltine threatened resignation for the first time.

At Cabinet on Thursday 12 December Heseltine had an angry exchange with Thatcher about the allegedly cancelled meeting (Thatcher claimed that no such meeting had ever been scheduled). Westland was not on the Cabinet agenda that day and Thatcher refused to permit a discussion on the matter, arguing that Cabinet could not do so without the necessary papers. Heseltine asked for his dissent to be minuted, and this was not done, although Cabinet Secretary Robert Armstrong claimed that this had been an error and added it himself. On Monday 16 December Brittan told the House of Commons that the decision was up to Westland; on Wednesday 18 December Heseltine won the backing of the Commons Defence Committee for the European Consortium's latest bid. On Thursday 19 December the matter was discussed at Cabinet for ten minutes: Cabinet approved leaving the decision to Westland and Heseltine was ordered to cease campaigning for the European option.

Over Christmas, Thatcher discussed with close colleagues the option of sacking Heseltine, as Brittan had urged her to do (Chief Whip John Wakeham cautioned against), but—as she later said in her memoirs—she shrank from doing so as he was too popular and weighty a political figure. Thatcher and ministerial colleagues spent two and a half hours writing three successive drafts of a letter threatening Heseltine with the sack, but did not send it as her press adviser Bernard Ingham advised that Heseltine might use it an excuse to resign.

== January 1986: leaks ==
By now the political row was being discussed in the media, partly because of the lack of other news in December. Cuckney wrote to Thatcher, at her behest, asking for reassurance that the Sikorsky deal would not damage Westland's business prospects in Europe. Heseltine was not satisfied with Thatcher's draft reply when he saw it and consulted Sir Patrick Mayhew (Solicitor-General and acting Attorney-General as Sir Michael Havers was ill) on the grounds that the government might be legally liable for any incorrect advice. Heseltine supplied extra material about the risk of losing European business, which Thatcher did not include in her reply to Cuckney. Thatcher replied to Cuckney to the effect that the British Government would continue to support Westland in gaining orders in Europe.

In early January Heseltine then wrote to David Horne of Lloyds Merchant Bank, who was advising the European consortium (in reply to planted questions from Horne which had been dictated to him over the phone by one of Heseltine's staff), giving him the advice which Thatcher had declined to include in her letter to Cuckney. Contradicting Thatcher's reassurances to Cuckney, Heseltine claimed that the Sikorsky deal would be "incompatible with participation" in European helicopter projects. Heseltine's letter was leaked to The Times. This was a blatant challenge to Thatcher's authority as Heseltine had not consulted Downing Street, the Department of Trade and Industry or Mayhew before writing to Horne.

Heseltine's letter to Horne, on Thatcher's request, was referred to the Solicitor-General, Patrick Mayhew. Mayhew sent a reply to Heseltine, noting "material inaccuracies" in Heseltine's letter, and asking Heseltine to write to Horne again, correcting them. Mayhew's letter of rebuke to Heseltine—marked "Confidential"—reached Heseltine at lunchtime on Monday 6 January and was immediately and selectively leaked to the Press Association by Colette Bowe, chief information officer at the Department of Trade and Industry, at Brittan's request. There was controversy over whose orders Colette Bowe was following. The Attorney-General, Sir Michael Havers, took a stern view of leaks, especially of confidential legal advice, and threatened to resign if an official inquiry was not set up to look into it. Thatcher agreed to do this.

== January 1986: Heseltine resigns ==
Cabinet met on the morning of Thursday 9 January, with Thatcher already having agreed her position with close colleagues at Chequers that weekend, and arranged that Scottish Secretary George Younger should take over as Defence Secretary if Heseltine resigned. Westland was first on the agenda, and Heseltine and Brittan were permitted to put their cases. Heseltine had won the moral high ground over the leaking saga, but Lawson recorded that he seemed obsessive at Cabinet and attracted little sympathy. Thatcher then reiterated her position, which had already been endorsed by the Cabinet, that Westland's future was a matter for Westland to decide, and announced that as this was a time of business negotiations all answers to questions about Westland must be cleared through the Cabinet Office. Heseltine agreed. However, in response to a question by Nicholas Ridley she then confirmed that this also applied to statements which had already been made. Heseltine argued that he should be allowed to reaffirm statements he had already made but Thatcher disagreed, arguing that Cabinet collective responsibility should be observed. Heseltine protested that there had been no collective responsibility, gathered up his papers and left. Although eyewitness accounts differ as to the exact details, Peter Jenkins wrote that Heseltine lost his cool and proclaimed "I can no longer be a member of this Cabinet". Heseltine then walked out of Downing Street and announced his resignation to the assembled media.

Thatcher then adjourned the Cabinet for a brief break. George Younger was then offered and accepted the office of Secretary of State for Defence, which Heseltine had just relinquished. The Prime Minister's office then requested Malcolm Rifkind to take up Younger's previous job, Secretary of State for Scotland, which he accepted. Cabinet then resumed.

At 4 pm that day at the Ministry of Defence (rather than waiting to make a statement to the House of Commons when it resumed four days later) Heseltine delivered a 3,000 word, 22 minute resignation statement detailing his grievances. He blamed Thatcher's intransigence, saying his views were ignored. He may well have prepared this earlier, although his private secretary Richard Mottram denied this. Thatcher was furious that Defence officials had helped Heseltine throughout the crisis and in preparing this document. Thatcher sent a letter to Heseltine, as is customary on these occasions.

== Brittan resigns; Thatcher survives ==
On 13 January, Thatcher held a meeting with Whitelaw, Brittan, Younger and John Wakeham to decide what should then happen. The conclusion was that Brittan, rather than the Prime Minister, should reply to Heseltine's statement on that day.

In his resignation statement in the House of Commons Heseltine accused Brittan of pressuring Sir Raymond Lygo, CEO of British Aerospace, to withdraw from the European Consortium. In response to questions in the House from Heseltine Brittan denied that he had received a letter from Lygo, but later had to admit that he had received a letter from Sir Austin Pearce, Chairman of British Aerospace; he had not disclosed it, he claimed, because it was marked Private and Strictly Confidential. He was forced to return to the House a few hours later to apologise.

On 15 January there was a debate on Westland in the Commons in which Thatcher replied to Neil Kinnock, the leader of the Labour Party. Thatcher listed all the ministerial, committee and Cabinet meetings on Westland. Heseltine then made a speech criticising the way collective responsibility had been damaged over Westland.

Sir Robert Armstrong, the Cabinet Secretary, held an inquiry into the leaking of Mayhew's letter and reported his findings to the Prime Minister on 21 January. Armstrong concluded that Brittan had told Bowe to leak Mayhew's letter through a telephone conversation to Roger Mogg, Brittan's private secretary. Thatcher is said to have asked Brittan four times: "Leon, why didn't you tell me." Havers, who demanded the inquiry, later claimed: "Unless the PM is the most marvellous actress I've ever seen in my life she was as shocked as anybody that in fact it was on Leon Brittan's instructions." At the time Brittan claimed he had misunderstood Thatcher's wishes but later (on the television programme The Thatcher Factor on 7 April 1989) admitted that he had acted on the "express" instructions of Charles Powell and Bernard Ingham, Thatcher's two senior advisers. On 23 January, Thatcher had to make a speech to the Commons on Armstrong's inquiry. The following day's Glasgow Herald described Thatcher's speech as "lackluster". Scottish Conservative MP and former Trade Minister, Alex Fletcher responded by saying that "the integrity of the Cabinet" was at stake and asked Thatcher if she thought her statement had "enhanced the integrity of your Cabinet?", reportedly causing Mayhew and Havers, to wince.

Brittan was being heavily criticised because of the fallout from the leak of the Mayhew letter and because of his lack of candour about the letter from British Aerospace, which critics characterised as misleading of parliament. A meeting of the 1922 Committee of Conservative back-benchers, held after Thatcher's speech on 23 January, demanded Brittan's resignation. At the meeting 12 out of 18 speakers called for Brittan to go, with only one MP, Jonathan Aitken, speaking in his defence. On 24 January therefore Brittan resigned because "it has become clear to me that I no longer command the full confidence of my colleagues".

On 27 January, Labour set down an adjournment motion. Whitelaw, Howe, Wakeham, John Biffen and Douglas Hurd helped Thatcher draft her speech for this occasion. Ronald Millar, one of the Prime Minister's friends, was asked to help revise the speech and Thatcher remarked to him that she might not be Prime Minister by six o'clock that evening if things went badly.

Neil Kinnock, the leader of the Opposition, was generally thought to have made a poor opening speech. Alan Clark recorded in his diary: "For a few seconds Kinnock had her cornered ... But then he had an attack of wind, gave her time to recover." Heseltine was frustrated at Kinnock's failure to exploit the moment and claimed that Thatcher's statement brought "the politics of the matter to an end" and that he would support the Government in the lobby.

Sikorsky then bought Westland, aided by mysterious prior purchases by mystery buyers, suspected by Cuckney and others, although without clear proof, of being an illegal concert party.

== Motivations of the actors ==
The Westland affair damaged Thatcher's reputation for credibility and made her look anti-European for the first time. It has been suggested that Thatcher's keenness on American control of Westland may have been linked to the Al-Yamamah arms deal, or that the US might have wanted Westland to sell Black Hawk helicopters to Saudi Arabia in circumvention of Congressional rules which prevented US arms sales to that country at the time.

Leon Brittan's behaviour was thought in part to have been motivated by resentment at his demotion from Home Secretary to Trade and Industry Secretary in September 1985. However, he also thought Heseltine's mooted European consortium to be monopolistic and anti-competitive.

Apart from his clash of personalities with Thatcher, it was thought that Heseltine, concerned at having to take responsibility for defence cuts which had been put back until 1986, and worried that Thatcher was unlikely to promote him further, was looking for an excuse to resign. Resigning would put him in good stead to be elected party leader after, as seemed likely at the time, the Conservatives would lose the next election due by summer 1988 at the latest.

Heseltine retired to the back benches and spent nearly five years conducting an undeclared campaign for the party leadership. Although the Thatcher government recovered in the opinion polls and was re-elected in 1987 by a landslide, Heseltine eventually challenged her in November 1990, polling well enough to hasten her resignation.

== Notes ==
=== Sources ===
- Campbell, John (2003), Margaret Thatcher: The Iron Lady, vol. 2, Pimlico, ISBN 978-0-7126-6781-4
- Clark, Alan (3 July 2003), Diaries: In Power 1983-1992, Phoenix, ISBN 978-1-85799-142-0
- Crick, Michael (1997), Michael Heseltine: A Biography, Hamish Hamilton, ISBN 0-241-13691-1
- Jenkins, Peter (1988), Mrs. Thatcher's Revolution: Ending of the Socialist Era, Cambridge: Harvard University Press, ISBN 978-0-674-58833-2, OL 2031622M
- Millar, Ronald (20 May 1993), A View From the Wings, London: Weidenfeld & Nicolson, ISBN 978-0-297-81301-9
- Thatcher, Margaret (18 October 1993), The Downing Street Years, HarperCollins, ISBN 978-0-00-255354-4
