= Mandatory offer =

Offer made by one company to purchase some or all outstanding shares of another company

In mergers and acquisitions, a mandatory offer, also called a mandatory bid in some jurisdictions, is an offer made by one company (the "acquiring company" or "bidder") to purchase some or all outstanding shares of another company (the "target"), as required by securities laws and regulations or stock exchange rules governing corporate takeovers. Most countries, with the notable exception of the United States, have provisions requiring mandatory offers.

== Overview ==
Country or territory	Mandatory offer threshold
Argentina	15%
Australia	20%
Austria	30%
Belgium	30%
Bermuda	No mandatory offer
Brazil	25%
British Virgin Islands	No mandatory offer
Canada	20%
China	30%
Czech Republic	30%
Egypt	50%
France	30%
Germany	30%
Guernsey	30%
Hong Kong	30%
India	25%
Indonesia	25%
Israel	25%
Italy	25%
Japan	1/3
Jersey	30%
Kuwait	30%
Malaysia	33%
Mexico	30%
Netherlands	30%
Russia	30%
Saudi Arabia	50%
Singapore	30%
South Africa	35%
South Korea	5%
Spain	30%
Sweden	30%
Switzerland	1/3
Taiwan	20%
Thailand	25%
Turkey	50%
United Kingdom	30%
United States	No mandatory offer
Vietnam	25%

Typically, a mandatory offer must be made when the acquiring company exceeds a certain shareholding threshold in the target, or gains actual control of the target. Most countries, with the notable exception of the United States, have such a requirement. The purpose of mandatory offer regulations is to protect minority shareholders in situations where control of the target is being transferred, and in particular to discourage acquisitions driven by private benefits of control by requiring that a premium be paid for such control.

Thresholds for mandatory offers vary widely between countries. A 2006 World Bank survey of the laws of 50 countries found thresholds ranging from 15% (India; became 20% in 2011) to 67% (Finland); the author's literature review did not find any study of the optimal level for the threshold. Thirty percent is a fairly common threshold, found in the City Code on Takeovers and Mergers followed in the United Kingdom as well as the laws of several other European countries. Depending on the ownership structure of the target, any given threshold short of absolute majority may in practice result in an acquirer being obliged to make an offer even when the acquirer has not yet established a controlling interest in the target, and even when another shareholder besides the acquirer retains the majority of shares; conversely, if the remaining shares not held by the acquirer are highly dispersed, actual control of the target could be attained without crossing the mandatory offer threshold. Takeover legislation in various European countries in the 1990s, for example in Austria, thus attempted to use de facto control rather than a specific threshold as the trigger for a mandatory offer; however, this presented enforcement difficulties, given that the threshold for control varied not only between target corporations but over time in the same target, and regulations later provided for a presumption of control upon achieving a specific threshold.

A mandatory offer rule is distinct from tag-along rights, which give minority shareholders the right to join in any sale by the majority shareholder: the former is an obligation imposed on the acquirer by laws and regulations, while the latter may be provided voluntarily by the majority shareholder of the target to minority shareholders through unilateral announcement or in a shareholders' agreement or similar private contract.

== By jurisdiction ==
=== Americas ===
==== Brazil ====
Brazilian corporate law provided for a mandatory offer rule prior to 1997. It was repealed that year, but then partially reinstated in 2000 due to pressure from institutional investors. A major transaction concluded prior to the rule's reinstatement was the Brazilian government's sale of its 66.7% of voting shares in Banco Banespa to Banco Santander, in which Banco Santander's tender offer covered only the government's state and excluded the minority shareholders.

==== United States ====
In the United States, the Williams Act of 1968, which regulates tender offers, does not contain any provisions requiring mandatory offers, due to concerns that such provisions could increase transaction costs in mergers and acquisitions.

=== Asia ===
==== China's mainland ====
A mandatory bid rule has been applicable in some form since 1993 to companies listed on the Shanghai Stock Exchange and Shenzhen Stock Exchange, although the China Securities Regulatory Commission (CSRC) is empowered to grant exemptions, and in practise acquirers can also structure their transactions to avoid triggering the rule in many cases. The first version of the rule was adapted from the similar rule in Hong Kong, as at the time many state-owned enterprises of China had already listed on the Hong Kong Stock Exchange, and the regulations' drafters sought advice from Hong Kong experts. The rule provided that upon acquiring 30% of the outstanding common stock of the target, the acquirer must make a bid for all remaining outstanding shares within 45 working days, at a price which at least matches the highest price paid by the acquirer in the past year for the shares it already holds, as well as the average market price of the shares within the last 30 days. That rule remained in effect after the passage of the 1998 Securities Law, though the 1999 law relaxed some related reporting requirements. 2002 regulations maintained the 30% threshold, but provided that the mandatory bid only had to be made if the acquirer intended to acquire more shares, and permitted the CSRC to grant exceptions to the obligation to bid. In 2006, both the Securities Law and the 2002 regulations were revised; Article 88 of the revised law left the 30% threshold intact, but weakened the bid requirement from the earlier mandatory bid for all outstanding shares to a bid for at least 5% of the outstanding shares.

==== Hong Kong ====
In Hong Kong, mandatory offers have been governed since 1975 by Rule 26 of the Code on Takeovers and Mergers, issued by the Securities and Futures Commission. The code does not have force of law. However, compliance with the code is required by Listing Rule 13.23 of the Hong Kong Stock Exchange.

==== India ====
In India, the mandatory bid rule originated in the 1980s as part of the listing agreement between listed companies and stock exchanges. After the Securities and Exchange Board of India (SEBI) became a statutory body with the power to issue subsidiary legislation under the SEBI Act 1992, the board promulgated the SEBI (Substantial Acquisition of Shares and Takeover) Regulations, 1994 (colloquially, the "Takeover Code"), governing takeovers, including a mandatory bid rule. A subsequent review committee chaired by former chief justice P. N. Bhagwati recommended the repeal of the 1994 regulations and their replacement by the SEBI (Substantial Acquisition of Shares and Takeover) Regulations, 1997. A third review led by Securities Appellate Tribunal chief C. Achuthan led to the replacement of the 1997 regulations by the SEBI (Substantial Acquisition of Shares and Takeover) Regulations, 2011. The mandatory bid provided for under the Takeover Code is a partial bid: it requires acquiring companies exceeding the shareholding threshold to offer to purchase some portion of the outstanding shares rather than all of them. Under the 1997 Takeover Code, the shareholding threshold was 15%; once exceeded, the acquirer would have to make an offer to purchase 20% of the outstanding shares. Under the 2011 Takeover Code, these percentages were raised to 20% and 26% respectively. The 2011 Takeover Code also provides for further mandatory bids by an incumbent who holds between 25% and 75% of a target upon an increase in holdings of at least 5% during a financial year.

==== South Korea ====
South Korea enacted a partial mandatory offer rule in January 1997 by an amendment to the Securities and Exchange Law. Under the rule, an acquirer which reached a 25% shareholding threshold would then have to make a bid to increase its holdings to a total amount defined by regulations; the subsequent regulatory update which took effect in April 1997 set the total amount to 50% plus one of the outstanding shares. However, as the financial crisis which began that year deepened, the rule was repealed the following year under pressure from the International Monetary Fund and the International Bank for Reconstruction and Development, who believed that the rule could deter takeover bids against companies in financial distress.

==== Taiwan ====
Though the United States is the main model for Taiwan's mergers and acquisitions laws, Taiwan adopted a partial mandatory offer requirement in 2002 in Article 43-1 of the Securities and Exchange Act. The mechanics of the rule were largely based on United Kingdom and Hong Kong rules, although Taiwan requires only a partial offer to purchase outstanding shares, rather than the full offer required in the United Kingdom and Hong Kong.

=== Europe ===
==== European Union directive ====
Among member states of the European Union, the 2004 Takeover Directive specifies general standards for national takeover legislation, including a mandatory offer rule, though the choice of threshold is left to individual states.

==== Germany ====
In Germany, mandatory offers are required under the Public Takeover Act. An acquiring company must make a mandatory offer upon achieving a "controlling interest" in the target, defined by § 35 of the act as a thirty percent direct or indirect shareholding. Upon reaching this threshold, the acquiring company must notify the target company and the Federal Financial Supervisory Authority, and make an offer in the form specified by § 11 of the act and its regulations to acquire the remaining shares.

==== France ====
France adopted a partial mandatory offer rule in 1989: it obligated the acquirer to offer to purchase two-thirds of the outstanding shares. In the 1990s, France's rule was expanded to require an offer to purchase 100% of outstanding shares. As of 2020, a mandatory offer is required when the threshold of 30% is reached, and the mandatory tender offer price must be at least the highest price paid by the bidder for securities of the target during the 12-month period preceding the crossing of the 30% threshold. In addition, a bidder launching a tender offer for a French target must extend its offer to any listed subsidiary of the target.

==== Sweden ====
Sweden adopted a mandatory offer rule in 1999.

==== Turkey ====
The legal framework governing mandatory offers in Turkish law was established by Article 26(1) of the Capital Markets Law (Sermaye Piyasası Kanunu, Law No. 6362 of 1981), authorising the Turkish Capital Markets Board to promulgate regulations governing mandatory offers. The first such regulations, the Communiqué on Principles Regarding Takeover Bids (Serial: IV, No. 44), were superseded in 2014 by the Communiqué on Tender Offers No II-26.1.
