= Authors in Focus =

1949 British TV literary discussion series

Authors in Focus was a British television series which aired in 1949 on the BBC. In each episode, a book would be discussed by a "spokesman" and a critic. Four episodes were produced.

The books discussed were The Triple Challenge by Francis Williams, The Theory of the Leisure Class by Thorstein Veblen Time was Away by Alan Ross, and Managers, Men and Morale by Wilfred Brown and Winifred Raphael.

It should not be confused with a 1954 series which had the same title, but with a different format.
