= Thomas Skyrme =

British civil servant

Lieutenant Colonel Sir Thomas Skyrme KCVO CB CBE TD JP DL

Personal details
- Born: 20 March 1913 Upper Norwood, London
- Died: 24 January 2002 (aged 78)
- Spouse: Suzanne Lyle
- Education: New College, Oxford, Inner Temple
- Occupation: Civil Servant, army officer, magistrate

Military service
- Allegiance: United Kingdom
- Branch/service: British Army
- Rank: Lieutenant Colonel
- Unit: Royal Artillery; Honourable Artillery Company

Lieutenant Colonel Sir William Thomas Charles Skyrme KCVO CB CBE TD JP DL (20 March 1913 – 24 January 2002) was a British civil servant, army officer, and magistrate. He served as Secretary of Commissions in the Lord Chancellor's Office for three decades.

== Education and early life ==
Thomas Skyrme was born in Upper Norwood, London, to British and American parents. He was educated at Rugby School, New College, Oxford, and the Inner Temple.

== Career ==
During the Second World War, Skyrme served in the Royal Artillery in the Middle East, North Africa, and Italy. He was wounded twice and was invalided out of the army with the rank of major in 1944. After the war, he founded and commanded G Locating Battery of the Honourable Artillery Company.

In 1948, he was put in charge of the magistracy as Secretary of Commissions in the Lord Chancellor's Office. In this role, he pushed for compulsory training for magistrates, which was introduced in 1980.

In 1970, he co-founded the Commonwealth Magistrates' Association with Clare Spurgin. He was its president from 1970 to 1979, and life vice-president thereafter.

== Personal life ==
He married Suzanne Lyle, daughter of Leonard Lyle, 1st Baron Lyle of Westbourne.

== Books ==
His published books include:

- The Changing Image of the Magistracy (1979)
- History of the Justices of the Peace (1990)

== Other appointments and honours ==
- Justice of the Peace (1948)
- Commander of the Order of the British Empire (1953)
- Companion of the Order of the Bath (1966)
- Freeman of the City of London (1970)
- Knight Commander of the Royal Victorian Order (1974 New Year Honours)
- Chairman of the Magistrates' Association (1979–81)
- Deputy Lieutenant of Gloucestershire (1983)
- Chairman of the Judicial Salaries Committee (1983–90)
- Chairman of the Broadcasting Complaints Commission (UK) (1985–7)
- Master of the Bench of the Inner Temple (1988).
