= Hilda Marjorie Simpson =

British nurse and researcher (1914 – 1992)

Hilda Marjorie Simpson OBE FRCN
- Born: 14 January 1914
- Died: 24 January 1992 (aged 78)
- Known for: nursing research leader

Hilda Marjorie Simpson, OBE, FRCN (14 January 1914 – 24 January 1992) was a pioneer in nursing research and founder of the Royal College of Nursing Research Society.

== Education and early career ==
Simpson attended Cheltenham Ladies' College before training as a nurse at St Thomas' Hospital, registering in 1932. She worked in St Thomas' Hospital Ophthalmic Department before training as a midwife (1938) and industrial nurse (1938-1939).

== Wartime and move to the Royal College of Nursing ==
In 1939 on the outbreak of World War II, Simpson was called up to serve in France and then Northern Ireland as a Queen Alexandra's Royal Army Nursing Corps Reserve (QUAIRMSR). In 1941 she used her industrial nurse training and worked in armament factories. In 1942 she joined the Royal College of Nursing as a Tutor in Education, supporting the pressing need to maintain nurse training during the war and remaining for the next 18 years. During this time she developed the Industrial, later Occupational Health, Nurse qualifying course.

In 1948 Simpson was part of a study tour in Europe for Royal College of Nursing industrial nurses which she wrote up in a series of articles for the Nursing Times. From 1952 to 1955 Simpson studied for a sociology degree at the London School of Economics before returning to her role at the Royal College of Nursing. In 1960 Simpson was appointed as Research Officer at the Royal College of Nursing where she oversaw the creation of the RCN Research Society. Simpson's advocacy for nurse researchers was hugely influential and cited as such by nursing leaders such as Jean McFarlane, Baroness McFarlane of Llandaff, Winifred Raphael, Lisbeth Hockey and Dorothy MacBride Radwanski, amongst others.

== Later career ==
In 1963 Simpson was appointed as Nursing Research Officer to the Department of Health and Social Security (DHSS), promoted in 1973 to Principal Nursing Officer, before retiring in 1974. Simpson spent 11 years at the DHSS devising and implementing a national framework for the development of research in nursing. Her work had significant impact on later developments such as Project 2000. Simpson was a member of the World Health Organization expert panel on nursing and involved in various international organisations including the International Council of Nurses.

== Honours and awards ==
In the 1974 New Years honours list, Simpson was appointed Officer of the Order of the British Empire (OBE). In 1976 Simpson was awarded Fellowship of the Royal College of Nursing FRCN.

== Death ==
Simpson died on 24 January 1992, in Pinner, Middlesex.
