= Jan Lewando =

British businessman (1909-2004)

Sir Jan Lewando CBE
- Born: Jan Alfred Lewando; 31 May 1909; Manchester, Lancashire
- Died: 2 July 2004 (aged 95); Chiltern, Buckinghamshire
- Occupation: Businessman
- Spouse: Nora Slavouski
- Children: 3

Sir Jan Alfred Lewando CBE TD (31 May 1909 – 2 July 2004) was a British businessman who was chairman of Carrington Viyella, and a former director of M&S.

Lewando was born into the Polish Ashkenazi community in Manchester, which included Marks and Spencer's founding families. His father who was a gifted tenor had left Poland for Ireland during the pogroms.

Lewando was knighted In the 1974 New Year Honours.

== Personal life ==
In 1948, he married Nora Slavouski and they had three daughters.

He died on 2 July 2004, aged 95.
