= The Takeover Code =

Set of rules for companies in the United Kingdom

The Takeover Code, or more formally The City Code on Takeovers and Mergers, is a binding set of rules that apply to listed companies in the United Kingdom, such as those trading on the London Stock Exchange. Many of its provisions are mirrored in the EU Takeover Directive. The Code is administered by the Panel on Takeovers and Mergers, which has the authority to enforce compliance and provide guidance on the interpretation of its rules.

== Contents ==
The code is designed principally to ensure that shareholders are treated fairly and are not denied an opportunity to decide on the merits of a takeover and that shareholders of the same class are afforded equivalent treatment by an offeror. The code also provides an orderly framework within which takeovers are conducted.

- Rule 3, who may advise shareholders on offers or approaches
- Rule 6, acquisitions requiring offer of a minimum level of consideration
- Rule 9, when a mandatory offer is required, and who is responsible to make it
- Rule 10, offer can be declared unconditional once the offeror holds over 50% of the voting shares of the offeree
- Rule 11, when cash or securities are required as the offer
- Rule 14, where there is more than one share capital class
- Rule 16, special deals with favourable conditions
- Rule 21, actions that could have the effect of frustrating a takeover bid require shareholder approval
- Rule 21.3, information provided by the board of the offeree to the recommended offeror must be available to a competing offeror (if one approaches)
- Rule 31.4, offer to remain open for 14 days after unconditional as to acceptances
- Rule 32.3, if the offer is revised all shareholders are entitled to reconsider
- Rule 33.2, shutting off cash underwritten alternatives
- Rule 36, for partial offers, the panel's consent is required
- Rule 37, regulating a company's purchase of own securities

== Links ==
- Rule 3 adviser
- Designated Professional Body

== See also ==
- Mergers and acquisitions in United Kingdom law
- Takeover Panel
- Hogg v Cramphorn Ltd [1967] Ch 254
- Howard Smith Ltd v Ampol Petroleum Ltd [1974] AC 821
- Imperial Group Pension Trust Ltd v Imperial Tobacco Ltd [1991] 11 ILRM 66, poison pill defence
- R v Panel for Takeovers and Mergers Ex p Datafin [1987] QB 815
