= Alan Dawtry =

British municipal government official (1915-2018)

Sir Alan Dawtry CBE TD
- Born: Alan Graham Dawtry; 8 April 1915; Sheffield, England
- Died: 27 January 2018 (aged 102); Westminster
- Education: King Edward VII School, Sheffield; Sheffield University
- Parent(s): Melancthon and Kate Nicholas (Kevan) Dawtry

Sir Alan Graham Dawtry CBE TD (8 April 1915 – 27 January 2018) was a British municipal government official. He was an assistant solicitor at Sheffield City Council between 1938 and 1948, deputy town clerk at Bolton, England between 1948-1952 and Leicester, England between 1952-1954 and town clerk Wolverhampton, England, 1954–1956. He was Chief Executive of the Westminster City Council between 1956 and 1977. During his career, he was also Town Clerk for the City of Westminster. In the 1974 New Year Honours, Dawtry was knighted.

== Early life and education ==
Dawtry was born in Sheffield; his parents were Melancthon and Kate Dawtry. After King Edward VII School, he studied law at Sheffield University, graduating in 1937.

== Second World War service ==
At the outbreak of the Second World War, Dawtry joined the British Army and served in France and the Mediterranean theatre. He was appointed an MBE for his role in planning landings at Salerno and Anzio.<the ref name="Guardian2018" />

== Local government career ==
Before the war, Dawtry worked for Sheffield City Council as a prosecutor on behalf of the police and the Director of Public Prosecutions.

After the war he held senior municipal posts, including periods as town clerk (chief executive) in Bolton, Leicester and Wolverhampton, before moving to Westminster.

=== Westminster ===
In 1956 Dawtry became town clerk of Westminster City Council (later retitled chief executive).

City of Westminster Council (October 2019) approved application for Commemorative Green Plaque for Sir Alan Dawtry in Pimlicoat Pimlico station underpass to recognise his role in bringing a station to Pimlico
