= Clare Spurgin =

British lay magistrate and youth justice activist

Clare Spurgin OBE JP
- Born: Frances Clare Skurray; 2 September 1897; Abingdon, Berkshire, England
- Died: 12 December 1986 (aged 89); Moreton-in-Marsh, Gloucestershire, England
- Education: University College London; University of Oxford
- Known for: Youth justice work

Frances Clare Spurgin, OBE, JP (née Skurray; 2 September 1897 – 12 December 1986) was a British lay magistrate and youth justice activist. She was active in Gloucestershire, England and internationally, and served as president of the International Association of Youth Magistrates (IAYM). She had "gained an international reputation for her work for young offenders".

== Early life and education ==
Frances Clare Skurray was born on 2 September 1897 in Abingdon, Berkshire, England. She was the eldest child of Thomas Skurray (1868–1938) and Mabel Edith Skurray (née Harris; 1871–1921). Her father was a brewery manager at her birth and rose to become chairman of Morland Brewery, of the Brewers' Society, and of Berkshire County Council. Her maternal grandfather had served as mayor of Abingdon.

She was educated at a school in Folkestone and St Helen's School, Abingdon, an all-girls independent school run by Anglican nuns. She then began the study of medicine at University College London and the Royal Free Hospital. However, following the death of her mother in 1921, she ended her medical studies and returned to the family home in Abingdon. She then undertook studies in anthropology at the University of Oxford, graduating with a diploma.

== Career ==
=== India ===
In 1925, she married Captain Arthur Rushworth Spurgin, an Indian Army officer. They lived in India for the next seven years and had three children together. Using her earlier aborted studies in medicine, she established a hospital in Sialkot, Punjab, for the wives of Indian Army soldiers. For this, she was awarded the Kaisar-i-Hind Medal for Public Service in silver. She was widowed in May 1934, when her husband died from leukaemia.

=== Early work in England ===
Following the death of her husband, she returned to England with her children. After the death of her father in 1938, she moved to Blockley, Gloucestershire. There, she became active in the Women's Institute. She went on to be elected as a parish councillor and to the North Cotswolds Rural District Council. She had a particular interest in housing policy and the provision of village amenities.

In 1939, the Second World War broke out. Spurgin turned her family home into a school for evacuated children. She also became the local leader of the Women's Voluntary Service, and was the voluntary food officer for her village to ensure equitable distribution of food in the event of an invasion. She led the district fundraising campaign as part of Warship Week 1942 for HMS Cotswold.

=== Magistrate ===
Spurgin was appointed a justice of the peace (JP) for Gloucestershire in 1943. As was common for female JPs, she became a specialist in youth court work and became the chair of the panel of juvenile court justices for her county. She would rise through the county's administration to become a member of the lord lieutenant's advisory committee (that selected new JPs), the county's police authority, and became chair of the Gloucestershire probation committee.

Spurgin also was active at national and international levels. She was involved in the national Magistrates' Association and represented it at the third congress of the L'Association Internationale des Juges des Enfants (AIJE) in 1950. At the 1966 seventh congress of the AIJE, now renamed as the International Association of Youth Magistrates (IAYM), she was elected its president; she was the first British citizen, first woman, and first lay justice to be its president. As IAYM president, she travelled worldwide visiting and attempting to make improvements to youth court justices, institutions for young people, probation service providers, and to child welfare. She also co-founded the Commonwealth Magistrates' Association with Thomas Skyrme. In retirement, she was made honorary life president of the IAYM. She continued to travel and make advancements in international co-operation between youth justices and youth justice organisations.

== Personal life ==
On 13 August 1925, she married Captain Arthur Rushworth Spurgin (1899–1934), an Indian Army officer who served in the 3rd Sikh Pioneers. Together they had three children. In 1961, her only daughter, Cecilia Jane, married George Gordon MacMillan, son of General Sir Gordon MacMillan and future chief of Clan MacMillan.

Having suffered a stroke, Spurgin died at the North Cotswolds Hospital in Moreton-in-Marsh, Gloucestershire, England, on 12 December 1986. Her funeral was held at Church of St Peter and St Paul, Blockley on 10 January 1987.

== Honours ==
Spurgin received a number of national, academic and honorary awards during her lifetime.

In the 1965 Queen's Birthday Honours, Spurgin was appointed an Officer of the Order of the British Empire (OBE) in recognition of her service as chair of the Blockley Petty Sessional Division of Gloucestershire. She was awarded the Cross of Honour of the Order of Saint Raymond of Peñafort by the Spanish government "for services to international co-operation among magistrates and judges of juvenile courts".

On 30 June 1983, Spurgin was awarded an honorary Doctor of Civil Law (DCL) degree by Durham University. In 1984, she was elected an honorary fellow of St Anne's College, Oxford.

== Selected works ==
- Mrs. Clare Spurgin, J.P. (July 1954). "In other Lands: Problem Families in Holland". Probation. 7 (4). National Association of Probation Officers: 37–39. doi:10.1177/02645505540070040.
- Spurgin, F. C. (18 February 1956). "Neglectful Mothers". British Medical Journal. 1 (4963): 397–397. doi:10.1136/bmj.1.4963.397-c.
- Spurgin, Clare (1986). My journey. Letchworth: Epsilon Press. ISBN 9781850270027.
