= Rule 3 adviser =

Authorised firm for shareholders in the United Kingdom

A Rule 3 adviser in the UK is a firm authorised, under the Takeover Code, to advise the shareholders of a company when there is an offer made for the company.

No person who is not so authorised may advise shareholders, especially minority shareholders, on the merits or otherwise of an offer or approach nor deal in the securities involved.

An independent adviser, typically an investment bank or firm of accountants, appointed under Rule 3.1 of the Takeover Code, gives advice to the board of the target company as to whether the financial terms of any offer (including any alternative offers) are fair and reasonable and, in fact, their opinion on whether the bidder will be able to implement the bid in full (rule 1). Their advice must be made known to shareholders in the offer document on a recommended bid or in the target's defence document on a hostile bid.

The Takeover Panel advises that the Rule 3 adviser needs to be independent of the offerer or bidder. Independence is often not a clear cut matter given the global reach of some of the accountancy firms and investment banks involved and the Takeover Panel has provided advice on how it will judge independence.
