= R (Datafin plc) v Panel on Take-overs and Mergers =

1987 UK legal case

- Court: Court of Appeal of England and Wales
- Full case name: R v Panel on Take-overs and Mergers; Ex parte Datafin plc
- Decided: 5 December 1986
- Citation: [1987] QB 815, [1987] WLR 699, [1987] 1 All ER 564

Court membership
- Judges sitting: Sir John Donaldson MR, Lloyd, Nicholls LJ

Keywords
- Amenability to judicial review, scope of public law

R v Panel on Take-overs and Mergers; Ex parte Datafin plc [1987] QB 815 is a UK constitutional law, company law and administrative law case of the Court of Appeal. It extended the scope of judicial review in English law to private bodies exercising public functions. Before Datafin, only bodies established by statute or prerogative powers could be judicially reviewed, while private bodies could only be sued for their actions in contract or tort law.

== Facts ==
The Panel on Take-overs and Mergers is the City of London's self-regulating mechanism for dealing with mergers and acquisitions. The applicant complained about a breach of the Panel code by another company involved in the process and were unhappy with the Panel's decision. The case ended up in the Court of Appeal, due to the fact that the High Court felt that it had before it a matter that was outside its jurisdictional reach. Because it considered that the defendant wasn't amenable to judicial review, it wasn't able to grant the claimant the required leave to continue on with the claim. The main issue facing the Court was whether to review the decision of a Panel set up under private law using the standards usually applied in administrative law.

== Judgment ==
The Court of Appeal held that the powers exercised by the Panel (regulating take-overs and enforcing a code of conduct on them) were essentially in the domain of public law and formed part of the Government's scheme to regulate the City. Those affected had no choice but to submit to the Panel's jurisdiction. As a result, the Panel had the duty to act judicially and its decisions could be checked by means of judicial review. On the merits, however, the Court found no ground to quash the disputed decision.

Sir John Donaldson, the Master of the Rolls, gave the leading judgment.

== Significance ==
This decision is important in the light of an increasing "privatisation" of public powers. In recent years, the Government has delegated many of its powers to formally private bodies, which nevertheless can make decisions affecting individual citizens and the society at large. Following the Datafin case, such decisions are now amenable to judicial review by courts.

In the later case of R v Panel on Takeovers and Mergers, ex parte Guinness plc, the judicial authority of the Panel was tested further in respect of the manner in which it handles investigations into breaches of the City Code on Takeovers and Mergers. In this case, the Panel refused to adjourn the appellant's hearing which related to its takeover of Distillers Co plc, in undisclosed concert with a Swiss bank, for which the Court of Appeal held that unless there was any real injustice caused by the Panel's procedure, it would take exceptional circumstances for the court to intervene (particularly if the appellant had not made use of the Panel's own appeals tribunal, as was the case).

== See also ==
- UK constitutional law
- UK company law
