= Private benefits of control =

Private benefits of control is a technical term used by corporate lawyers and economists. It refers to the economic gain from exerting influence on a company by large shareholders at the expense of small shareholders.

== Types ==
There are two different types of private benefits of control from company value perspective: Benefits which reduce the value of company and which do not so. An example was given by Barclay and Holderness, in comparison to benefits that accrue to all shareholders by raising the productivity of the company.

The private benefits can be pecuniary, including higher salaries for individual blockholders or below-market transfer prices for corporate blockholders. For example, T. Boone Pickens alleges that Koito, a Japanese auto part maker, has for many years been subsidizing sales to a large shareholder, the Toyota Car Group. Mr. Pickens recently bought a large block of stock in Koito and demanded board representation, in part to stop the private benefits that allegedly have been flowing to Toyota. Private benefits need not come from the firm’s cash flows, however. For example, there may be nonpecuniary control amenities for individual blockholders [Demsetz and Lehn (1985)] or synergies in production for corporate blockholders [Bradley (1980)].

== Protection ==
In order to prevent the impact on the small shareholders from the realization of these benefits of large shareholders, there is usually a mandatory offer policy in transaction area for protection of the small shareholders from kinds of value-destroying transactions.

== See also ==
- Corporate governance
- Control premium
- Mandatory offer
