= John Cuckney, Baron Cuckney =

British industrialist and peer (1925–2008)

The Right Honourable The Lord Cuckney

Member of the House of Lords
- Lord Temporal
- Life peerage 25 July 1995 – 30 October 2008

Personal details
- Born: John Graham Cuckney; 12 July 1925 India
- Died: 30 October 2008 (aged 83)
- Party: Conservative
- Spouses: Muriel Scott Boyd (m. 1960–2004) Jane Newell (m. 2007–2008)
- Education: University of St Andrews
- Occupation: Industrialist

John Graham Cuckney, Baron Cuckney (12 July 1925 – 30 October 2008) was a British industrialist, civil servant and peer.

== Early life and career ==
Born in India to Air Vice-Marshal E. J. Cuckney and his wife Lilian, Cuckney was educated at Shrewsbury School. He read medicine at the University of St Andrews, returning after service with the Royal Northumberland Fusiliers and the King's African Rifles during World War II to study history and economics. He was recruited by MI5, with whom he served until 1959. Cuckney's time in MI5 featured in Peter Wright's book Spycatcher, where Wright described him as "a tough, no-nonsense" officer.

== Business and public service ==
After leaving MI5, he worked in the City at stockbroking firm Standard Industrial Group, before joining merchant bank Lazard, where he became the first director to resign in over 100 years. He then established Anglo-Eastern Bank with Sir David Alliance, specialising in trade finance between Britain and the Middle East.

Cuckney was appointed chairman of the Mersey Docks and Harbour Board in 1970, which he restructured and restored to viability following the possibility of insolvency. He left in 1972 to become the first chief executive of the Property Services Agency, set up to manage the government's property estate. In 1974 he moved to the Crown Agents, which was in financial difficulty following the secondary banking crisis of 1973–1975. He joined as chairman and separated out the military sales arm as International Military Services (a Ministry of Defence company), which he also became chairman of and served until 1985. He left the Crown Agents in 1978, and briefly joined the Port of London Authority before being knighted.

He subsequently became director and/or chairman of various companies, including travel company Thomas Cook, Midland Bank, tea company Brooke Bond, engineering firm John Brown, helicopter manufacturer Westland, Royal Insurance, Investors in Industry (later 3i), pharmaceutical company Glaxo, and Orion Publishing Group.

In 1991 he received an Honorary Doctorate from the University of Bath.

== Westland affair and Maxwell scandal ==
Cuckney had gained a reputation as a "the company doctor who never lost a patient" following his involvement with the Mersey Docks and Harbour Board, Crown Agents, and John Brown. His appointment in 1985 as chairman of Westland, when the company was facing bankruptcy, saw him become involved in the 1985–1986 Westland affair, a political scandal for Margaret Thatcher's Conservative Party government. Cuckney, with Thatcher, favoured a merger with the American company Sikorsky, while the Secretary of State for Defence Michael Heseltine favoured a European merger. The American option prevailed, and the affair led to Heseltine's resignation.

In 1992 he was appointed as an advisor to Peter Lilley, Secretary of State for Social Security, following the death of Robert Maxwell and the discovery that he had stolen hundreds of millions of pounds from his companies' pension funds. He headed the Maxwell Pensioners' Trust and in 1995, brokered a £276 million out-of-court settlement, known as the Major Settlement, between the pension schemes and those institutions against which the schemes had potential legal claims.

He was created a life peer in 1995 as Baron Cuckney, of Millbank in the City of Westminster, sitting as a Conservative in the House of Lords.

== Arms ==
Coat of arms of John Cuckney, Baron Cuckney

Crest
Two dragons’ heads addorsed the necks entwined and conjoined in base the whole winged Or.
Escutcheon
Vert on each of two flaunches Argent cotised rayonny on the outer edge or a flaunch Vert.
Supporters
On either side a seadragon Vert supporting a trident Or.
Motto
Whither The Fates Call
