= Takeover Directive =

The Takeover Directive 2004/25/EC is an EU Directive governing how European company law treats mergers and acquisitions. It sets standards for how long a bid can remain open, to whom it is offered, and what information companies must publicly disclose about the bid. The most controversial provision, later made optional, required a target company's board of directors to remain neutral during the bidding process.

== Content ==
- art 3, general principles including the equal treatment principle for shareholders
- art 4, the requirement on member states for an authority to monitor takeovers (e.g. in the UK, this is the Takeover Panel)
- art 5, the requirement to make a mandatory bid for everyone's shares, and giving an equitable price
- art 6, minimum requirements for information on a bid being made
- art 7, member states can set between 2 and 10 weeks as a limit for the period for acceptance of a bid
- art 8, bids should be made public without material errors or misrepresentations
- art 9, board neutrality rule, no frustrating action may be taken without specific post-bid shareholder approval. Directors may, however, still seek out another more favourable bidder (or ‘white knight’) or complete measures begun pre-bid that fall into a company's ordinary course of business.
- art 9(2) board can search for a more favourable suitor
- art 9(5) board should give its views on a bid
- art 11, non compulsory opt in rules Gives breakthrough provisions to defeat, (a) share structures making minority shareholders have disproportionate voting rights (b) limitations on share ownership (c) restrictions on share transfers in the company's articles or a share holder agreement.
- art 12, bnr is optional in art 9(2), and neither is art 11.
- art 20, directive provisions will be reviewed in 2011.

== See also ==
- UK company law
