= Scheme of arrangement =

Court-approved corporate agreement

A scheme of arrangement (or a "scheme of reconstruction") is a court-approved agreement between a company and its shareholders or creditors (e.g. lenders or debenture holders). It may affect mergers and amalgamations and may alter shareholder or creditor rights.

Schemes of arrangement are used to execute arbitrary changes in the structure of a business and thus are used when a reorganisation cannot be achieved by other means. They may be used for rescheduling debt, for takeovers, and for returns of capital, among other purposes. It is not a formal insolvency procedure, but it can be used alongside insolvency procedures such as administration.

== By country ==
=== Australia ===
In Australia, the relevant provisions for effecting a scheme of arrangement or reconstruction are located in Part 5.1 of the Corporations Act 2001 (Cth). Section 411(1) states that where a company and its creditors or shareholders propose a compromise or arrangement, the court can order a meeting or the creditors or shareholders. Once the scheme is proposed, an application must be made to court for the meeting. The shareholders and creditors then meet in classes and if the scheme is approved, it is authorized at a second court hearing. The court order is effective once it has been filed with the Australian Securities and Investment Commission.

The requirements to approve a scheme are very similar to those in English law. There are two tests: a majority in value test which requires 75% of each class to vote in favor of the scheme and a majority in number test (or headcount test) which requires a majority of people present to vote in favor. This is the requirement for a creditor scheme, but the head-count test was amended in 2007 for member schemes. The Australian court now can approve a member scheme even if a majority of members present and voting at the meeting are not in favor.

Member schemes are used frequently, especially for takeovers, but creditor schemes are not as common. However, recent case law has suggested that creditor schemes may be more flexible than a deed of company arrangement, particularly in regard to third party releases. In addition, a company must be in administration to rely on a deed of company arrangement which is not a requirement for a scheme.

Section 411(17) of the Australia Corporations Act 2001 governs the use of schemes of arrangement for a takeover. The court can only approve a scheme if it is satisfied that the scheme is not intended to avoid takeovers legislation and it has received a statement from the Australian Securities and Investment Commission which permits the arrangement. The court can then approve the scheme in accordance with its overriding fairness discretion. In Re ACM Gold Ltd, the ASIC opposed the proposed scheme of arrangement but O’Loughlin J allowed the application and stated that Chapter 6 should not automatically supersede Chapter 5. The courts have adopted a more liberal application of section 411(17), looking primarily for evidence that the company has a bona fide commercial reason for the scheme.

=== Canada ===
In Canada, schemes are referred to as "plans of arrangement" and the relevant provision is section 192 of the Canada Business Corporations Act, 1985.

=== Ghana ===
In Ghana, the relevant provision for effecting a scheme of arrangement is section 239 of the Companies Act, 2019. In order for the shareholders or creditors to approve the scheme, the majority in value test (requiring 75% approval of each class) and the majority in number test must be satisfied. The Registrar-General will then appoint a qualified insolvency practitioner as a reporter to determine if the arrangement or compromise is fair.

Previously, the scheme was in section 231 of the Companies Act, 1963 (Act 179) and was derived from section 206 of the UK Companies Act 1948.

=== Malaysia ===
In Malaysia, the relevant provision for effecting a scheme of arrangement is section 366 of the Companies Act 2016, which allows the court to order a meeting to discuss a compromise or arrangement. An arrangement is defined as a reorganization of the company's share capital. The compromise or arrangement must be approved by 75% of the creditors or shareholders who are present at the meeting. The Malaysian Code on Takeovers and Mergers 2016 applies to schemes.

Previously, the scheme was in section 176 of the Companies Act 1965. The 'section 176' procedure was adopted from section 206 of the UK Companies Act 1948, but the Malaysian scheme had the distinct feature of allowing a company to apply to the court for a restraining order. This had the effect of establishing a moratorium under section 176(10).

=== New Zealand ===
In New Zealand, the relevant provision is section 236(1) of the New Zealand Companies Act 1993 and sections 236A and 236B which were added on 3 July 2014, by section 30 of the Companies Amendment Act 2014. Section 236(1) states that when the court receives an application from a company, or any of its shareholders or creditors, it can order that an arrangement, amalgamation, or compromise is binding on the company.

When the Companies Act 1955 was reformed in 1989, the New Zealand Law Commission divided the previous scheme of arrangement provisions into two separate procedures. There is a prescriptive option that does not require court sanction, but instead allows shareholders or creditors to bring an amalgamation on a 75% vote at a meeting, and a procedure which allows the High Court to order an amalgamation or compromise without a vote. The provisions for amalgamations are in Part XIII of the Companies Act 1993 and schemes of arrangement are in Part XV.

Schemes of arrangement in New Zealand cannot easily be used for takeovers. The New Zealand Takeovers Code says no person can have a holding greater than 30% of a company's voting rights or, if a higher percentage is already held, increase that holding. There is no exemption for an acquisition above this percentage which is the result of a scheme of arrangement. An exemption would need to be obtained from the New Zealand Takeovers Panel.

It is usual for the court to require 75% of shareholders or creditors to vote in favour of the scheme, but there is no headcount test. However, section 236A amended the provisions as they relate to code companies. The court cannot approve a scheme in these circumstances unless it believes that the company shareholders will not be adversely affected by the change occurring through the use of a scheme rather than the Takeovers Code, or the Takeovers Panel has presented the court with a no-objection statement.

=== Nigeria ===
In Nigeria, the Companies and Allied Matters Act 2020 replaced the Companies and Allied Matters Act 1990 on August 7, 2020. Section 710 of the 2020 Act defined an 'arrangement' as

any change in the rights or liabilities of members, debenture holders or creditors of a company or any class of them or in the regulation of a company, other than a change effected under any other provision of this Act or by the unanimous agreement of all parties affected

=== South Africa ===
In South Africa, the relevant provisions for effecting a scheme of arrangement are found in the Companies Act 2008, No. 71 Of 2008, Sections 114 and 115.

=== United Kingdom ===
In the United Kingdom, the relevant provisions for effecting a scheme of arrangement are found in the Companies Act 2006, Part 26 (sections 895–901) and Part 27 (special rules for public companies). There are three requirements for a scheme. A 'compromise or arrangement' must be proposed between the company and its shareholders or creditors. Under section 896, an application must be submitted to court requesting an order for a meeting. Then the shareholders or creditors will hold meetings to seek approval of the proposed scheme. If it is approved, the court must sanction the scheme and the court order will be filed with the Registrar of Companies.

== See also ==
- Mergers and acquisitions
- Reconstruction (law)
- Takeover
