= Winifred Raphael =

British occupational psychologist

- Born: Winifred Jessie Gertrude Spielman; 21 October 1898
- Died: 14 December 1978 (Age 80)
- Occupation: Occupational psychologist

Winifred Jessie Gertrude Spielman (21 October 1898 – 14 December 1978), more specifically known as Winifred Raphael, was a British occupational psychologist.

== Early life ==
She lived in London and was the fourth child in her Jewish family. Her sister was the feminist Eva Hubback. At age 16, Raphael began attending Bedford College, University of London, initially studying social work. The first of her diplomas from Bedford enabled her to become a qualified Sanitary Inspector in the London County Council. As her interests grew through university, she changed course, first to physiology and then to psychology. She graduated in 1920 with a BSc in Psychology.

== Career ==
Her first job was at the forerunner to King's College London (KCL) as a part-time demonstrator in physiology. From an early age she always had an interest in the social and career problems experienced by children in the UK, in part instigated by her parents who were involved in industrial schools and an orphanage for Jewish children. Cyril Burt, then psychologist at the London County Council, noticed a section on devising tests for use on vocational guidance within her thesis and decided to involve her in his work of standardising the process of intelligence tests for English children.

When the National Institute of Industrial Psychology (NIIP) was formed, Burt was promoted to Head of the Vocational Section. He employed Raphael as his assistant, where she worked for 39 years, later becoming the Assistant Director. Initially with Burt, she worked on developing and standardising the specific vocational tests, which were later reported on by Burt.

Her work at the NIIP was mainly aimed at industrial settings, examining such issues as management practices and what was needed for good staff morale. She also took part in the first London Experiment on Vocational Guidance. This work was conducted between the Industrial Fatigue Research Board and the NIIP, which was reported on by Frances Gaw (1925, 1926).

It was this interest in vocational psychology that enabled her to get involved in a project examining why 28% of the girls who left elementary schools in the London area became dressmakers’ apprentices. Her first task was to devise and implement tests for the dressmakers’ apprentices to complete, which were carried out at the Debenhams department store in London. During this, she realised that she no longer wanted to work with children but to work more closely with adults working in shops and factories.

A.H. Lee Ltd tapestry manufacturers were her first factory assignment looking to develop tests for staff who worked there. During this time, Winifred started to introduce rest pauses and other improvements for staff including enhanced lighting for tapestry tracers and better methods of crewel-work stitching and needle threading.

Her career progressed into working for Harrods and the John Lewis Partnership, both in London and the North. Throughout this time, she became involved in trying to improve the industrial conditions for workers in the cash tube room. Having studied physiology, she became very sensitive to the standards of lighting, heating, humidity and air movement within workplaces and advocated the importance of reduction of glare, the spacing and posture of operators, and the layout of equipment for better working conditions. At this time, there was not much information about these subjects available, but by 1932 she had started to amass a number of publications in this subject.

In 1928 she secured a Rockefeller Travelling Scholarship and travelled to North America.

She was involved in the installation of the NIIP engineering apprentice selection battery; again, the emphasis was placed on developing standardised tests within the industrial setting, including a paper-folding test which proved useful for the selection of sewing machinists in a corset-making factory.

Raphael retired from NIIP in 1961, and soon after started a new career working for the King Edward’s Hospital Fund for London, which later became the King’s Fund. During this time she wrote a series of surveys on how patients view life in hospital and it was this work that brought her to the attention of the Royal College of Nursing (RCN) Research Discussion Group in 1963.

She was associated with the RCN for some 30 years, lecturing and writing. Her last survey ‘Old People in Hospital’, published in 1979, was completed shortly before her deaths. Her contribution to nursing research was described in the first Winifred Raphael Memorial Lecture by Hilda Marjorie Simpson (1981), “a lifetime of non-judgemental exploration of people’s hopes and interests, seen always within a social framework and closely related to practical outcomes.”

Raphael was interviewed, in March 1976, by the historian, Brian Harrison, as part of the Suffrage Interviews project, titled Oral evidence on the suffragette and suffragist movements: the Brian Harrison interviews. She talks primarily about her sister, Eva Hubback, but also about her own training and study of psychology.

== Recognition ==
In 1981, the Royal College of Nursing began an annual research lecture in her name supported by a memorial fund set up by her family. The event takes place each year in October and brings together an audience made up of nurses, healthcare workers and since 2010, the general public.

== Her own work ==
Raphael, W.S & Roberts, G.H (1932) The selection of telephone operators. Human Factor, 6, 389-412

Raphael, W, Frisby, C.B & Hunt L.I (1932) Industrial Psychology Applied to the Office. London: Pitman

Raphael, W.(1937) Grievances – their ascertainment and alleviation. Human Factor, 11, 91-96

Raphael, W., Heamshaw, L.S., Mead, R.T. & Fraser, J.H.M (1938) Labour turnover in the London district. Occupational Psychology. 12. 196-214

Raphael, W.S (1942) The problems of inspection. Occupational Psychology, 16. 157-163

Raphael, W.S. & Rodger, A. (1942) Industrial Recruitment and Training Joint Conference. NIIP and Institute of Labour Management.

Raphael, W. (1944) A technique for surveying employee’ opinions and attitudes. Occupational Psychology, 18, 165-175.

Raphael, W.(1947) A study of some stresses and strains within the working group. Occupational Psychology, 21, 92-101

Raphael, W.(1959) Recent survey findings in UK and other European countries. In F.A Heller (ed) New Developments in Training. London Polytechnic, Regent Street.

Raphael, W. (1962) Employers’ and Workers’ Attitudes Towards Communications. J.K.L Taylor Report. OECD: Paris.

Raphael, W. (1969) Patients and their Hospitals. London: King Edward’s Hospital Fund.

Raphael, W. (1972) Psychiatric Hospitals viewed by their Patients. London: King Edward’s Hospital Fund.

Raphael, W. (1974) Just an Ordinary Patient. London: King Edward’s Hospital Fund.

Raphael, W. & Mandeville, J. (1977) Being an Outpatient. London: King’s Fund Project Paper.

Raphael, W. & Mandeville, J. (1979) Old People in Hospital. London: King Edward’s Hospital Fund.

Raphael, W. & Zimmerman, M.W. (1963) After the Takeover. London : NIIP Report No.15

Raphael, W. (1964) An autobiography. Occupational Psychology. 38, 1.
