= Harry Gabb =

English organist

Harry Gabb CVO (1909 – 1995) was an English organist, who served at Llandaff Cathedral, St Paul's Cathedral and the Chapel Royal.

== Background ==
(William) Harry Gabb was born in Ilford, Essex on 5 April 1909.

He studied organ at the Royal College of Music where he won the George Carter Organ Scholarship.

He was awarded the MVO in 1961 and the CVO in 1974. He was a Special Commissioner for the Royal School of Church Music, and as a Council Member of the Royal College of Organists. on 16 May 1974 he was awarded a Lambeth Doctor of Music by the Archbishop of Canterbury

He died on 16 March 1995 at the age of 85.

== Family ==
He married Helen Mutton in 1937. They had one son.

== Career ==
Sub organist of:

- Exeter Cathedral 1929 - 1937
- St Paul's Cathedral 1946 - 1974

Organist of:

- St Jude's Church, West Norwood 1925 - 1928
- Christ Church, Gipsy Hill 1928 - 1929
- St Leonard's Church, Exeter and St. Michael and All Angels, Heavitree 1929 - 1937
- Llandaff Cathedral 1937 - 1946
- Chapel Royal 1953 - 1974
- St. Lawrence's Church, Chobham 1974 onwards

He was Professor and Examiner of Organ Playing at Trinity College of Music 1946 - 1988.

Cultural offices
Preceded by George Galloway Beale	Organist of Llandaff Cathedral; 1937-1946	Succeeded by Albert Vernon Butcher
Preceded by Edgar Stanley Roper	Organist, Composer and Master of the Children of the Chapel Royal; 1953-1974	Succeeded by Timothy Farrell
