= Concert party (business) =

Type of business takeover

A 'concert party' is a group of people acting in concert in a takeover bid. In the UK, there are rules for such bids, regulated by regulators such as the Takeover Panel.

There is a 30% threshold at which a mandatory offer must be made. This is considered to be reached when a concert party jointly hold 30% of the shares in a company, not when one of them does. The same applies to other financial instrument holdings such as derivatives. Some entities are presumed to be acting in concert unless shown otherwise. These include the directors, subsidiaries, associate companies and the parent company of the bidder.

Even entities that are not part of a concert party may find that rules applying to them: they are required to disclose dealings in the share of the bidder or the target. These "associates" are people who have an interest in the outcome of the bid (other than simply as shareholders) but who are not deliberately acting in concert with the bidder, An example of associates are the directors the target company even when they are not acting in concert with either the bidder or a potential counter-bidder.

== See also ==
- Mandatory offer
