= Ian Robertson (Royal Navy officer) =

Royal Navy Rear-Admiral (1922–2012)

Rear-Admiral Ian George William Robertson CB DSC (21 October 1922 – 22 February 2012) was a British admiral who as a pilot became one of the few Royal Naval Volunteer Reserve officers to reach flag rank.
