= Reconstruction (law) =

Transfer of a company's business to a new company

Reconstruction, in law, is the transfer of a company's (or several companies') business to a new company. The old company will get put into liquidation, and shareholders will agree to take shares of equivalent value in the new company.

In UK company law, the governing provisions are in the Insolvency Act 1986, ss. 110–111. The sanction of a court is not required (unlike under a so-called "scheme of arrangement", which could or creditors). Yet if a shareholder objects, he or she may require a cash payment instead of shares. Creditors who object to have their debts transferred to a new company can demand satisfactions during the old company's liquidation.

Small private companies, family companies and investment trusts often use the procedure. The purposes can vary, from changing the objects of the business, varying share class rights, or reorganize before a demerger takes place.

== See also ==
- Bankruptcy
- Mergers and acquisitions
