= The Takeover Panel =

Government regulatory body in the United Kingdom

The Panel on Takeovers and Mergers
- The Takeover Panel

Agency overview
- Formed: 1968
- Jurisdiction: United Kingdom
- Headquarters: London, EC4
- Employees: 26
- Agency executive: Ian Hart, UBS, Director General
- Website: www.thetakeoverpanel.org.uk

The Panel on Takeovers and Mergers, or more commonly The Takeover Panel, is the United Kingdom's regulatory body charged with the administration of The Takeover Code.

It was set up in 1968 and is located in London, England.

Its role is to ensure that all shareholders are treated equally during takeover bids. Its main functions are to issue and administer the City Code on Takeovers and Mergers (the "Code") and to supervise and regulate takeovers and other matters to which the Code applies. Its central objective is to ensure fair treatment for all shareholders in takeover bids.

== Powers ==
The Panel is a statutory body under Chapter 1 of Part 28 (sections 942 to 965) of the Companies Act 2006 as amended by The Companies Act 2006 (Amendment of Schedule 2) (No 2) Order 2009. It has established a reputation for giving informed advice in an expert area of regulatory activity. It is the de facto arbiter of takeover bids and has the support of government and other organisations with statutory involvement.

The European Takeovers Directive mandated that the Panel was put on a statutory footing. This was completed in the Companies Act 2006.

Whenever a transaction is made on the LSE or other London-based exchange that is greater than £10,000, the details of the transaction are passed on to the panel for their evaluation, and a levy is charged of £1.50 (as of 2 December 2024) on the transaction, which goes to the panel as payment (known as the "PTM levy").

It was decided in R v Panel on Take-overs and Mergers, ex p Datafin plc that decisions of this panel are subject to judicial review, even though it was at that time (i.e., in 1986) only a private body. This was due to its "enormous power" and "giant's strength". As The Panel is now a statutory footing, its decisions can now be reviewed even without referring to this case.

== Directors General ==
The Takeover Panel has been led by the following individuals since inception:

- 1968-72: Ian Fraser
- 1972-74: John Hull, Schroders
- 1974-76: Martin Harris
- 1976-79: David Macdonald, Hill Samuel
- 1979-81: Graham Walsh, Morgan Grenfell
- 1981-83: J.M. Hignett, Lazard
- 1983-85: T G Barker
- 1985-87: John Walker-Haworth, a Director of S G Warburg
- 1987-89: Antony Beevor, Hambros
- 1989-92: Geoffrey Barnett, Barings
- 1992-94: Frances Heaton, Lazard
- 1994-96: William Staple, Rothschild
- 1996-99: Alistair Defriez, SBC Warburg
- 1999-01: Patrick Drayton, Schroders
- 2001-03: Philip Remnant, Credit Suisse First Boston
- 2003-05: Richard Murley, Goldman Sachs
- 2005-07: Mark Warham, Morgan Stanley
- 2007-10: Robert Hingley, Lexicon
- 2010 (interim): Philip Remnant
- 2010-13 Robert Gillespie, Evercore
- 2013-15: Philip Robert-Tissot, Citigroup
- 2015-18: Crispin Wright, Rothschild
- 2018-21: Simon Lindsay, Citigroup
- 2021-24: Ian Hart, UBS
- 2024– : Omar Faruqui, Barclays

== International equivalents ==
International equivalents to the Takeover Panel
Nation	Panel
Australia	Australian Takeovers Panel
Hong Kong	Takeovers and Mergers Panel
Ireland	Irish Takeover Panel
New Zealand	Takeovers Panel
Sweden	Swedish Securities Council (Swedish: Aktiemarknadsnämnden)
