= O'C(P) v DPP (2000) =

Irish Supreme Court case

O'C (P) v DPP [2000] 3 I.R. 87
- Coat of arms of Ireland
- Court: Supreme Court of Ireland
- Full case name: O'C (P) v DPP [2000] 3 I.R. 87
- Decided: 6 July 2000
- Citation: O'C (P) v DPP [2000] 3 I.R. 87

Case history
- Appealed from: The High Court
- Appealed to: The Supreme Court

Court membership
- Judges sitting: Keane C.J., Denham J., Murray J., Hardiman J., Geoghegan J.

Case opinions
- The public interest in ensuring that every person received a fair trial took precedence over the public interest in the prosecution and punishment of crime. The delay in making the original complaint would not be grounds for prohibiting the prosecution. The applicant had established specific prejudice as a result of the delay and the order of the High Court would be upheld. However, this was done as an exception to the general rule. It was held that the right of the State to proceed with prosecuting cases where there had been a long delay was subject to the right of the accused to receive a fair and speedy trial. However in this trial the case did not turn solely on the issue of delay but rather on the absence of evidence which the applicant could have relied on had there not been such a delay. The Court held that the applicant had established specific prejudice as a result of the delay in the case and order of the High Court would be affirmed.
- Decision by: Keane C.J., Denham J., Murray J., Hardiman J., Geoghegan J.

Keywords
- Right to Fair Trial, Reasonable Expedition, Significant Delay, Indecent Assault, Sexual Abuse, Presumption of Innocence

O'C(P) v DPP [2000] 3 IR 87[1]; (2000) IESC 58 is a reported Irish Supreme Court case decision where the court examined the issues of "delay" and the right to a fair trial. The Court stated that under Article 38.1 of the Constitution, provides that no one shall be tried for a crime "save in due course of law," and stated that anyone accused with an offence has a right to a trial that is performed with reasonable expedition. The complainant's delay in informing the authorities of the alleged sexual abuse was found to be justified by the Court given the circumstances of the alleged offence. The court found that the applicant's ability to defend himself had been substantially affected by the delay, creating a real possibility of an unfair trial. Finally, the Supreme Court dismissed the complainant's appeal and upheld the decision of the High Court.

== Background ==
P.O'C was charged with five counts of indecent assault. In a Dublin school between 1982 and 1983, P.O'C assaulted P.K. sexually. P.K. attended 30-minute Friday night music lessons with P.O.C., a music teacher. At age 7, P.K started taking violin lessons with P.O'C. When P.K. was 11 years old, the first offence happened.

In 1982, P.O'C gave car enthusiast P.K. magazines and books on the subject which helped him befriend P.K. After P.K.'s lesson, P.O'C suggested a chat. P.O'C closed the doors and made P.K. kneel when the offence happened. P.K. did not tell his parents about this until 1995 as P.O'C told him to keep it a secret. Fourteen years after the abuse, P.K. informed the Gardaí. On January 19, 1996, the Gardaí interviewed P.O.C who denied sexually abusing P.K.

He was brought to the Circuit Court after being charged with the offences. The Director of Public Prosecutions testified P.K.'s delay in reporting to Garda was caused by his emotional and psychological response to the sexual abuse. Due to the DPP's delay in providing evidence, the trial was postponed, and a new date of October 16, 1997 was scheduled.

In the new trial, K.W.'s statement illustrated P.K's 1990 complaints. P.O'C's lawyers opposed new evidence. The jury was discharged and a new trial was rescheduled. In P.O'C's affidavit, to determine when teachers obtained keys to the tutorial room, his lawyers searched for witnesses and supporting evidence. The school's director could not recall such classroom details, he was unable to remember any evidence to support P.O'C.

P.O.C. was permitted to submit a judicial review application on January 23, 1998. His request for orders, including a prohibition order, was heard by Mrs. Justice McGuinness on October 30, November 26, and December 21, 1998.

P.O.C. asserted that his right to a fair trial was affected as a result of the length of time between the offence and the trial. He also claimed that he was the victim of prejudice and discrimination. The delay, according to P.O'C's lawyers, made it difficult to interview witnesses and gather evidence to disprove the allegations against him. His lawyers argued that the Complainant's whole account of the events would be invalid if P.K.'s statement of closing the doors was untrue. However, P.K's lawyers argued that the DPP did not delay pursuing or charging P.O'C with the offences and that if there was a delay, P.O'C was responsible. P.O'C failed to show that the delay prejudiced him. As there are no time restrictions for prosecuting these offences, the amount of time between the offence and the trial is insufficient to consider the trial to be unfair.

P.K could not proceed against P.O'C because the trial would be unfair, the High Court's Mrs. Justice McGuinness ruled on March 4, 1999. P.K.'s delay was excused by McGuinness J. A trial at this point, in her opinion, would be unfair.

On April 15, 1999, P.K. filed an appeal against the High Court's decision. On May 18, 2000, the Supreme Court heard his appeal.

== Holding of the Supreme Court ==
The Supreme Court (Keane C.J., Denham, Murray, Hardiman, and Geoghegan JJ) ruled on July 6, 2000.

Each person is entitled to be tried with reasonable expedition under Article 38.1 of the Constitution. When the prosecution does not postpone a trial, the Complainant's delay in filing a complaint may be excusable. In circumstances of child sexual abuse by a parent or step-parent, Keane J. stated that the courts cannot apply the presumption of innocence fully. However, Murray J said that the presumption of innocence must always be protected. Keane J explained his approach by noting that a court should not be forced to restrain a trial because a large period of time had passed even though the complaint was only delayed due to an adult who had dominion over the child when they were mistreated.

There wouldn't be a justification to stop a trial if it was found out that the reason for the delay in submitting a complaint was the nature of the crime itself, and an accused person's own behaviour.

The Court must determine if the Applicant's right to defend himself was so tampered with that an unfair trial was likely. Fair trials are guaranteed under the Constitution. Since P.O'C was P.K.'s teacher and the crime was reportedly committed at school, the dominion reference seen in other situations where the criminal is the child's parent or the crime took place at home does not apply. Despite a valid relationship where the accused exerted power, dominion over the child is not easily drawn in this situation.

The Supreme Court held that the High Court was correct in its decision. P.O'C argued the delay in time should be inexcusable. He also claimed that P.K's account of him locking the doors before committing the crime is crucial in terms of evidence. If he could prove that this was untrue then the credibility of allegations made by P.K. would fail. P.K. retaliated that the responsibility was with P.O'C to show that he was subject to an unfair trial. However, he failed to show this in his affidavit and only relied on hearsay evidence of a letter from the former director explaining his difficulty of remembering details. The responsibility of an accused to point to evidence is not a heavy burden: one is required to do so on a balance of probabilities. The Court agreed that there is a burden of P.O'C on a balance of probabilities, to show that his right to a fair trial would be interfered with because of P.K making a delayed complaint.

The Court held that P.O'C cannot depend on prejudice that accused persons of sexual abuse faces in order to halt his trial due to the nature of this offence and the psychological evidence submitted. If he is to claim that there is a specific prejudice then he needs to do so in detail. In this case P.O'C had relevant assertions in respect of the prejudice he faced. His solicitor indicated there was difficulty in raising a defence which might help P.O'C. Therefore, the Court held that P.O'C sufficiently indicated what defence he would have raised had there been enough evidence open to him. A public interest in entitling every person to a fair trial overbears the public interest to prosecute someone for an offence.

The Supreme Court was satisfied with the findings of the High Court judge, any risk of an unfair trial cannot be overcome by rulings and directions to the jury during the course of the trial itself. There remains an unfairness to P.O'C when the evidence is unavailable and the allegations cannot be properly analysed by a jury. There is a risk of a miscarriage of justice. The prosecution did not take any steps to counter-argue and establish whether locking the room could still be proven.

The Court observed that the prosecution should have taken precautions to avoid a situation in which there is an undisputed assertion. P.O'C had proven prejudice caused by the delay, and the High Court's decision was upheld. This, however, was done in defiance of the norm. According to Mr. Justice Murray, the right of the accused to an expeditious trial was a condition of the State's ability to pursue charges after a significant delay. But in this case, the absence of evidence that P.O'C may have relied on if there hadn't been a delay was more important than the issue of delay itself. Therefore the High Court's order was upheld.

== See also ==
- Supreme Court of Ireland
- Right to a fair trial
- Constitution of Ireland
- High Court (Ireland)
- Circuit Court (Ireland)
- Director of Public Prosecutions (Ireland)
- Judicial review in the Republic of Ireland
- Hearsay
