= Board of Management St. Molaga's National School v The Secretary General of the Department of Education and Science =

Irish Supreme Court case

St. Molaga's National School v. The Department of Education
- Coat of arms of Ireland
- Court: Supreme Court of Ireland
- Full case name: Board of Management of St. Molaga's National School v. The Secretary General of the Department of Education and Science, and Kevin Meehan, Máire Ní Mhairtín and Paddy Hogan and A. and B.
- Decided: 23 November 2010
- Citation: [2010] IESC 57, [2011] 1 IR 362

Case history
- Appealed from: High Court of Ireland
- Appealed to: Supreme Court of Ireland

Court membership
- Judges sitting: Murray CJ, Denham J, Hardiman J, Fennelly J, Finnegan J

Case opinions
- Decision by: Justice Susan Denham

Keywords
- Right to Education

Board of Management St. Molaga's National School v The Secretary General of the Department of Education and Science [2010] IESC 57, [2011] 1 IR 362, is a case in which the Supreme Court of Ireland ruled that under Section 29 of the Education Act 1998, the decision of a school's board of management to refuse to enrol a student may be subject to a full re-hearing by an appeals committee appointed by the Minister for Education.

== Background ==
In terms of background of the case, the parents have applied for places for their two children, aged 9 and 10 at the time, at St. Mologa’s National School. The parents were verbally informed that the school was full and no further pupils were accepted. The above response was further confirmed in writing to the parents in a letter dated the 6th of February 2008.

St. Mologa’s National School is a senior primary school with 3rd to 6th classes only and has a longstanding relationship with St. Peter and St. Paul’s School. The latter cater for children up to 2nd class only. Therefore, the enrollment policy of St. Mologa’s National School is to give priority to pupils entering 3rd class coming from Sr. Peter and Paul’s School, then to siblings of children already in the school, then to catholic children of the parish, then to catholic children outside the parish and finally to non-catholic children from outside the parish. The school has no formal transfer policy to cater for children seeking to enter the school other than new entrants in 3rd class.

As the school board of management refused to enroll the two children, the parents appealed the decision to the appeal committee with the appeal being allowed. The school board of management brought judicial review proceedings of the decisions of the appeals committee and Judge Irvine in the High Court allowed the appeal, as such the appeals committee appealing to this Court against the judgement and order of the High Court quashing the decisions of the appeals committee.

The issue that was raised was the interpretation of Section 29 of the Education Act 1998, the High Court Judge accepting the submissions of the board of management in so far that a “Section 29 appeal is limited in its scope.”

=== Grounds of appeal ===
The grounds of appeal were filled by the appeals committee on the 9th of June 2009, submitting that the High Court erred in law and in fact on a number of occasions, as follows:

i) The appeals committee acted ultra vires within the powers conferred on the committee under Section 29.

ii) The substantive power given under Section 29 did not give the appeals committee the jurisdiction to re-hear the appeal.

iii) The substantive power given under Section 29 did not allow the appeals committee the jurisdiction to substitute, on appeal from a decision of the board of management, its decision.

iv) The powers of the appeals committee were restrained to reviewing the lawfulness and/or reasonableness of the board of management’s decision making.

v) Applying the “informed interpretation rule”.

vi) The appeals committee did not regard the considerations on reaching its decision.

== Holding of the Supreme Court ==
Ruling on the above grounds of appeal, the Supreme Court expressed the view that the description of the process of Section 29(1) is straightforward. In circumstances where a board refused to enroll a student in a school, the parent can appeal that decision to the Secretary General of the Department of Education and Science.

The Supreme Court was of the view that Section 29 should be attributed its plain meaning as its literal meaning was clear, unambiguous and not absurd.

Accordingly, the Supreme Court held that it was further satisfied that an appeals committee has the jurisdiction to conduct a full re-hearing on an appeal under Section 29. It therefore held that the High Court had erred in its interpretation of Section 29 and allowed the appeal on the preliminary issue.

== Subsequent developments ==
The Supreme Court's ruling on the interpretation of Section 29 has been applied in subsequent case law.

== See also ==
Education in the Republic of Ireland
