= Tony O'Connor =

Tony O'Connor may refer to:

- Tony O'Connor (teacher) (1921 or 1922)
- Tony O'Connor (rugby union) (1934–2015), Welsh rugby union player
- Tony O'Connor (composer) (1961–2010), Australian composer, producer and performer
- Tony O'Connor (footballer) (born 1966), Irish football player
- Tony O'Connor (rower), Irish rower
- Tony O'Connor (judge), Irish judge
