= Ann Power =

Irish judge

The Hon. Ms. Justice Ann Power

Judge of the Court of Appeal
- Incumbent
- Assumed office 4 November 2019
- Nominated by: Government of Ireland
- Appointed by: Michael D. Higgins

Presiding Judge of the Kosovo Specialist Chambers and Specialist Prosecutor's Office
- In office 27 February 2017 – 4 November 2019
- Nominated by: Government of Ireland
- Appointed by: Alexandra Papadopoulou

Judge of the European Court of Human Rights
- In office 22 January 2008 – 30 October 2014
- Nominated by: Government of Ireland
- Appointed by: Council of Europe

Personal details
- Born: 23 November 1962 (age 63) Dublin, Ireland
- Education: Mater Dei Institute of Education; Trinity College Dublin; University College, Oxford; King's Inns

Ann Power (born 23 November 1962) is an Irish judge who has served as a Judge of the Court of Appeal since November 2019. She previously served as a Presiding Judge of the Kosovo Specialist Chambers and Specialist Prosecutor's Office from 2017 to 2019 and a Judge of the European Court of Human Rights from 2008 to 2020.

== Early life ==
Power was born on 23 November 1962 in Dublin. She studied English and Philosophy at the Mater Dei Institute of Education, Dublin, from 1980 to 1984 (B.Rel.Sc. 1984), and for a Master of Education degree at Trinity College Dublin, specialising in Philosophy, from 1984 to 1987, graduating first class both times. In 1986, she began working as a secondary school English teacher, and in 1987 combined this with lecturing in philosophy. From 1989 to 1991, whilst still teaching and lecturing, she studied for a Diploma in Legal Studies from the King's Inns, the institution through which barristers are admitted to legal practice in Ireland, and from 1991 to 1993, she undertook legal training there as a barrister, winning the John Brooke Scholarship for first place in Ireland in the final Bar examinations. She later matriculated as a DPhil candidate in Jurisprudence and Legal Philosophy at University College, Oxford in 2012.

== Career ==
Power was admitted as a barrister in 1993 and worked as an advocate before the Superior Courts of Ireland, whilst continuing to lecture in Philosophy. She developed a practice in Constitutional, Public and Medical law, as well as Immigration and Asylum law, and from 1998 to 2003, she was a lecturer in jurisprudence at King's Inns. In 2006, she was appointed Senior Counsel, at one point representing Taoiseach Bertie Ahern.

=== European Court of Human Rights ===
In September 2007, Power was nominated under Article 22 ECHR along with Fionnuala Ní Aoláin and Roger Sweetman to the Parliamentary Assembly of the Council of Europe to be considered for appointment as the judge in respect of Ireland at the European Court of Human Rights. Ní Aoláin withdrew her candidacy shortly afterwards for personal reasons, and in her stead was nominated David Keane. On 22 January 2008, Power was elected, achieving 125 votes out of 173 cast. She was elected at the same time as the judges for Bulgaria, Latvia, Moldova and Turkey, and is a member of Section III of the Court. Her term expired in 2014.

Shortly after being appointed to the Court, in July 2008, Power withdrew from participating in the case of A, B and C v Ireland, a case brought by three women challenging Ireland's controversial abortion laws. She did so under Rule 28 of the Rules of Court, which restricts a judge from participating in consideration of a case where they will or may not be able to be impartial, for example where a family member is involved or they have previously acted in the matter. She was originally to be replaced in the Grand Chamber hearing by Supreme Court judge Nicholas Kearns, however, he withdrew on being appointed President of the High Court, and she was instead replaced by Judge Mary Finlay Geoghegan.

Power resigned from the European Court of Human Rights in October 2014, three years before the expiry of her term. Judge George Birmingham wrote a letter to Taoiseach Enda Kenny in 2015 in his role as president of the Association of Judges of Ireland on the subject of Power, suggesting there would be negative repercussions of not appointing former judges of the European Court of Human Rights to the Irish courts.

=== Return to Practice ===
Power returned to work as barrister in Dublin at the Law Library and in London with Doughty Street Chambers. She served as a Presiding Judge to the Specialist Chamber of the Constitutional Court at the Kosovo Specialist Chambers and Specialist Prosecutor's Office from February 2017 to November 2019.

=== Court of Appeal ===
Power was appointed to the Court of Appeal in November 2019. She was appointed as one of six judges following the enactment of legislation to allow the expansion of the total number of Court of Appeal judges.

In July 2020, she was announced as the chairperson of a three-judge tribunal into the CervicalCheck cancer scandal. She serves with Tony O'Connor and retired judge Brian McGovern.

== Personal life ==
Power lists her interests as including drama, singing, travelling, painting and hillwalking. She speaks English, Irish, French and Polish. From 1988 to 2000, she was an appointed member of the Academic Council of All Hallows College, a Roman Catholic college in Drumcondra, Dublin, which is part of Dublin City University.
