= PM v Director of Public Prosecutions =

Irish Supreme Court case

PM v The Director of Public Prosecutions
- Coat of arms of Ireland
- Court: Supreme Court of Ireland
- Citation: [2006] 3 IR 172, [2006] IESC 22, [2006] 2 ILRM 361

Court membership
- Judges sitting: Kearns J, Geoghegan J, Murray CJ, Denham J, Hardiman J

Case opinions
- When there is a prosecutorial delay, a balancing exercise must be carried out, but if there is serious blameworthy prosecutorial delay that is one factor in itself and of itself that must be considered.

Keywords
- Constitution; Delay; Injunction

PM v Director of Public Prosecutions [2006] IESC 22; [2006] 2 ILRM 361; [2006] 3 IR 172 is an Irish Supreme Court case in which the Court upheld the decision of the lower court that PM (the respondent in the Supreme Court appeal) had satisfied the balancing test applicable in cases of delay in prosecution. This balancing test requires an accused to show that his/her rights that are protected by the right to a speedy trial (such as the right to "prevent oppressive pre-trial incarceration") were so interfered with as to entitle him the relief he seeks. This case determined that prosecutorial delay that deprives an accused of these rights is, in and of itself, one factor to consider in carrying out the balancing exercise.

== Background ==
In September 2001, PM was charged with three counts of gross indecency which were allegedly committed against his nephew, GL. The offences took place between August 1982 and December 1985 (between when GL was 13 years old and when he was 16 years old). During the time the offences took place, GL lived in a house next door to PM's family house. GL initially made a complaint to a Garda Síochána (police) who then investigated his case. Subsequently, PM was arrested and questioned by the police in July 1999. After a decision was made to prosecute PM, he was again arrested and charged in December 2000. PM sought to prohibit his trial on the grounds of the delay in time. He cited the long time lapse between the time the alleged offences were committed and the initial complaint being made. Moreover, there was a further delay between when the initial complaint was made and when he was charged. However, on the basis of expert evidence from a psychologist, the High Court found that the delay in making the complaint was "referable to the accused’s own actions." The lower court judge was not, therefore, satisfied with PM's claim that his ability to defend himself had been "impaired" and that the trial should not go ahead.

The DPP appealed to the Supreme Court and invited the court to determine whether "in a case of blameworthy prosecutorial delay, there is nonetheless an obligation on an applicant to establish in addition some degree of prejudice referable to the breach of his right to an expeditious trial which would entitle him to a prohibition order." PM (as respondent) cross-appealed on the basis that the psychologist's opinion was not credible as she did not refer to any of GL's psychiatrists. Also, the very reason that she is a psychologist and not a qualified psychiatrist offers a substantial ground to overlook that particular evidence.

== Holding of the Supreme Court ==
Written judgments were provided by Kearns J and Geoghegan J, with whom the other judges agreed.

The Court had to decide what to do in situations where there is a long time gap between when the alleged offences were committed and when the victim first addressed a complaint. In addition, the court had to consider situations where there is also a blameworthy delay after that time by the prosecution. In such a circumstance, the question for the court was whether the trial be prevented on the basis of a blameworthy delay or should the accused show that his right to an expeditious trial was interfered with in such a drastic way that he is entitled to the relief he seeks?

The right to trial with reasonable expediency is a right conferred upon an individual by the Constitution. Furthermore, different principles may apply in relation to blameworthy delay on the part of the prosecution. If there is a delay in cases such as those involving sexual offences, it is important that the trial does not proceed any further because otherwise an accused's constitutional right given in Article 38.1 will be in breach. In this case, when there was already a delay between the time when the crime happened and the initial complaint, any additional delays by the prosecution should not be tolerated. The Supreme Court determined that the balancing test identified by Keane CJ in PM v Malone is appropriate for this case too. This test provides that an accused must show that he faced some type of difficulties as a result of the prosecutorial delay so as to outweigh the community interest to prosecute those guilty of criminal offences. For example, an accused can show that he faced additional stress and anxiety which arose from the delay in his prosecution or oppressive pre-trial incarceration. Geoghegan J explained that this need not be measured quantitatively. This is because it is obvious that a person who is suspected of sexual offences and who is innocent will have a certain degree of stress and anxiety. Characterising a person as innocent is only for the purposes of the presumption of innocence. Nevertheless, the courts should look at the blameworthy delay and the nature of the alleged crimes. If the length of the blameworthy delay is short then a mere fact that there was a delay will not suffice. So when balancing out the two aspects identified above, courts must have regard to the length of such blameworthy delays.

The Supreme Court held that there had been an unjustified delay of approximately 34 months between the initial evidence provided to the police and the subsequent charges brought against PM. It was the decision of the Supreme Court that there had been a blameworthy delay in this element of the case.

In conclusion, the Supreme Court upheld the decision of the High Court dismissed both the appeal and the cross-appeal. As Geoghegan J noted: "I entirely agree that a balancing exercise must be carried out but if there is serious blameworthy prosecutorial delay that is one factor in itself and of itself that must be put into the melting pot when the balancing exercise is being considered"

== See also ==
- Supreme Court of Ireland
- Presumption of innocence
- Department of Public Prosecutions
- High Court (Ireland)
