= Stephens v Paul Flynn Ltd =

Irish Supreme Court case

Gerald J.P. Stephens v. Paul Flynn Ltd., [2008] IESC 4; [2008] 4 IR 31.
- Coat of arms of Ireland
- Court: Supreme Court of Ireland
- Full case name: Gerald J.P. Stephens v. Paul Flynn Ltd., [2008] IESC 4; [2008] 4 IR 31.
- Decided: 25 February 2008
- Citation: [2008] IESC 4; [2008] 4 IR 31

Case history
- Appealed from: High Court
- Appealed to: Supreme Court

Court membership
- Judges sitting: Kearns J, Macken J, Finnegan J

Case opinions
- Decision by: Kearns J.
- Concurrence: Macken J; Finnegan J.

Keywords
- Construction, Procedural, Delay, ECHR.

Gerald J.P. Stephens v. Paul Flynn Ltd. [2008] IESC 4; [2008] 4 IR 31 was an Irish Supreme Court case in which the Court ruled that, absent special circumstances, a party's failure to deliver a statement of claim within a period of twenty months is inexcusable and will justify dismissal of the litigation.

== Background ==
Gerald J.P. Stephens, the owner of a property, hired Paul Flynn Ltd. to build a house in Hollymount, County Mayo, for an agreed price of €350,215.58. Construction began in 1994. Following a disagreement between parties over the long time involved in executing the project, Mr Stephens stated his desire to no longer avail of the construction services he had agreed with Paul Flynn Ltd. Conversely, the defendant claimed that Mr Stephens had not been adhering to the agreed payment plan.

In December 1995, the defendant boarded the house to protect the interests of the company following non-payment of Mr Stephens. Mr Stephens thus claimed that the defendant's failure to complete the construction of the house constituted repudiation of the contract.

The defendant's repudiation of the contract added ambiguity concerning the balance of justice for both parties. Mr Stephens had his desired dwelling postponed for a significant period of time. In turn, Paul Flynn Ltd. had constructed a building for which they received a payment not commensurate with the time and work contributed to the project.

In the High Court, Clarke J held that Mr Stephens' inordinate and inexcusable delay in instituting proceedings in a timely manner would have the effect of denying the defendant a fair trial and so he dismissed his claim for want of prosecution.

== Holding of the Supreme Court ==
In the judgment of Mr Justice Nicholas Kearns, with which both Macken J and Finnegan J agreed, the Supreme court upheld the decision of Clarke J of the High Court.

The Supreme Court agreed that a delay of 20 months in the filing of a statement of claim was inordinate. The court placed a particular emphasis on the rights of due process and fair procedure on both parties. Furthermore, reference was made to Article 6 of the European Convention on Human Rights as established by the European Council. As considered in McMullen v. Ireland, the courts have a duty to ensure that cases are concluded in a reasonable time.

In assessing the High Court's dismissal of the plaintiff's action due to his delay, the Supreme Court was "satisfied that the plaintiff ha[d] altogether failed to meet the requirement in the instant case to demonstrate [that the High Court had undertaken] an unreasonable exercise of discretion". In relation to the balance of justice between both parties, the Court was also "quite satisfied that the learned High Court judge was completely correct on this issue". The Supreme Court added that, in light of the plaintiff's delay in commencing proceedings in the first place, the onus on him to prosecute them expeditiously was all the greater.

== Subsequent developments ==
Clarke J adopted the same approach in the case of Rodenhuis and Verloop B.V. v HDS Energy Ltd. as he did in Stephens v. Paul Flynn Ltd. The test applied by the learned judge has provided a trusted platform to adopt when assessing the balance of justice and fair procedure for both parties in dispute before the courts on this question.

It is also important to highlight that although the disagreement between the parties in Stephens v. Paul Flynn Ltd. occurred in 1995, for such actions to be heard in court today, the courts have a constitutional obligation to consider a party's right to fair trial under the European Convention on Human Rights Act 2003.
