= Barniville =

Barniville is a surname. Notable people with the surname include:

- David Barniville (fl. from 1988), Irish judge
- Geraldine Barniville (1942–2026), Irish squash and tennis player
- Henry Barniville (1887–1960), Irish politician and surgeon
