= Michael Moriarty (judge) =

Irish judge (born 1946)

Judge of the High Court
- In office 11 March 1996 – 23 November 2018
- Nominated by: Government of Ireland
- Appointed by: Mary Robinson

Judge of the Circuit Court
- In office 13 January 1987 – 11 March 1996
- Nominated by: Government of Ireland
- Appointed by: Patrick Hillery

Personal details
- Born: 10 August 1946 (age 79) Belfast, Northern Ireland
- Spouses: Mary Irvine (div.); Doreen Delahunty
- Children: 3
- Education: University College Dublin; King's Inns

Michael Anthony Moriarty, SC (born 10 August 1946) is a retired Irish judge who served as a Judge of the High Court from 1996 to 2018 and a Judge of the Circuit Court from 1987 to 1996.

== Early life and career ==
Michael Moriarty was born in Belfast to James and Nora Moriarty. He moved to Dublin in 1960 and was educated at Blackrock College, University College Dublin and King's Inns. He was called to the Irish Bar in 1968, and became a Senior Counsel in March 1982. He specialised in criminal law at the bar.

He was appointed Chairman of the Employment Appeals Tribunal in 1986.

== Judicial career ==
He became a Circuit Court judge in 1987. He was subsequently appointed a High Court judge in March 1996. He was the chairperson of the Lord Mayor's Commission on Crime.

He is best known as Chair of the Moriarty Tribunal, which he chaired between 1997 and 2010. The Tribunal investigated the financial affairs of former Taoiseach Charles Haughey and former Minister Michael Lowry. The first report, in 2006, found that Haughey had misappropriated funds. The second report, delivered in 2011, found that Lowry had shared information with Denis O'Brien "of significant value and assistance" to aid in the awarding of a mobile telephone licence.

He retired in April 2018, following 31 years as a judge.

== Personal life ==
He was formerly married to Mary Irvine, with whom he has three children. He subsequently married Doreen Delahunty.
