= Brian McGovern =

Brian McGovern may refer to:

- Brian McGovern (footballer) (born 1980), Irish footballer
- Brian McGovern (judge), Irish judge, Judge of the Court of Appeal (2018–2020)
