= Raymond Groarke =

Irish judge (born 1952)

President of the Circuit Court
- In office 20 July 2012 – 12 July 2019
- Nominated by: Government of Ireland
- Appointed by: Michael D. Higgins
- Preceded by: Matthew Deery
- Succeeded by: Patricia Ryan

Judge of the Circuit Court
- In office 22 July 1996 – 10 January 2022
- Nominated by: Government of Ireland
- Appointed by: Mary Robinson

Personal details
- Born: 1952 (age 73–74)
- Education: University College Dublin; King's Inns

Raymond Groarke (born 1952) is a retired Irish judge who served as President of the Circuit Court from 2012 to 2019 and a Judge of the Circuit Court from 1996 to 2022.

Groarke was born in 1952. He was educated at Clongowes Wood College, University College Dublin and the King's Inns. He was called to the Bar in 1973. He practiced as a barrister, predominantly on the Midlands circuit. Groarke is married to Joan.

In 1996, he was appointed a judge of the Circuit Court. He was assigned to the Eastern Circuit between 1998 and 2005, before moving to the Western Circuit. Following the end of his term as president, he returned to sit as an ordinary Circuit Court judge in County Galway and County Mayo for the Western Circuit.

He was appointed President of the Circuit Court in 2012. As President of the Circuit Court and through the remainder of his term as an ordinary judge, he was an Ex officio member of the High Court. His term concluded in July 2019. He was succeeded by Patricia Ryan. His final day as a judge was 10 January 2022.
