= De Roiste v Minister for Defence =

Irish Supreme Court case

De Róiste v Minister for Defence
- Coat of arms of Ireland
- Court: Supreme Court of Ireland
- Decided: 19 January 2001
- Citation: [2001] 1 IR 190; [2001] IESC 4; [2001] 2 ILRM 241

Case history
- Appealed from: High Court
- Appealed to: Supreme Court

Court membership
- Judges sitting: Keane CJ, Denham J, Fennelly J

Case opinions
- Seeking grounds for judicial review after 29 years from the issue.
- Concurrence: Keane CJ, Denham J, Fennelly J
- Concur/dissent: Concur

Keywords
- Constitutional Law, Judicial Review, Administrative Law

De Róiste v Minister for Defence, [2001] 1 IR190, [2001] IESC 4; [2001] 2 ILRM 241, was an Irish Supreme Court case in which the Court held that the extended delay (three decades in this case) in bringing forward an action was grounds for dismissal of charges.

== Facts of the Case ==
Dónal de Róiste served as a lieutenant in the Irish Defence Forces. He was commissioned on 27 February 1965 as second lieutenant and promoted to Lieutenant on 27 September 1967. He was assigned to the signal corps in Athlone. In April 1969, De Róiste claimed he was put under close service arrest by his superior officer. Upon release, De Róiste maintained he saw a solicitor about his detention yet proceedings were never initiated.

In 1969, the director of military intelligence received a report. The report alleged that De Róiste was part of 'an IRA splinter group' whilst attending an auction in Clancy Barracks. Whilst interrogated, De Róiste maintained that he did not know why he was being interrogated. He also maintained that he was not aware of these people's activities.

De Róiste was never arrested nor placed under court martial. De Róiste was then abruptly retired from his position under section 47(2) of the Defence Act, 1954. De Róiste then emigrated to Britain after his dismissal. He subsequently emigrated to America. He returned to Ireland in the mid 1980s. During the 1997 Irish presidential election, Adi Roche who is Donal De Róiste's sister was one of the five presidential candidates. During the election, the media began to release stories of her brother's dismissal from the Defence Forces and the controversy surrounding it.

== High Court ==
Dónal de Róiste took legal action against the State for judicial review into his retirement from the Defence Forces. Mr Justice Geoghegan gave leave to De Róiste so that he can seek judicial review regarding the circumstances of his dismissal. De Róiste took his appeal to the High Court. On 28 June 1999 the High Court Judge, McCracken J dismissed De Róiste's proceedings stating

"In summary, therefore, it is my view that the applicant, while undoubtedly having suffered a traumatic experience, has not shown that he was so affected by that experience that he was unable to issue these proceedings over such a lengthy period." De Róiste did suffer a traumatic experience, due to the report that claimed he was part of the IRA. He maintained his innocence yet he was wrongfully dismissed. However, there was a significant time delay in bringing the case against the State.

After this decision De Róiste appealed to the Supreme Court.

== Holding of the Supreme Court ==
The Supreme Court agreed that the time delay in bringing the case against the State amounted to a necessary dismissal of the appeal. In the nearly thirty years after his dismissal from the army, De Róiste had not brought his case to court. Hence, his appeal for certiorari had been in vain. An order of certiorari means a higher court reviews a case from the lower court, to determine whether an unlawful decision has been made.

A prior case, The State (Furey) v Minister of Defence also involved an army member being dismissed from service. De Roiste had relied on the obiter dictum set forth in Furey. Judge McCarthy delivered the obiter dictum in 'The State (Furey) v Minister of Defence':

... I see no logical reason why delay, however long, should, of itself, disentitle to certiorari any applicant for the remedy who can demonstrate that a public wrong has been done to him - that, for instance, a conviction was obtained without jurisdiction, or that, otherwise, the State has wronged him and that the wrong continues to mark his life." One may consider that this is a fair evaluation, as a wrongful conviction, despite how long a delay, should be dealt with sufficiently.

In her judgment, judge Denham disavowed the dicta in Furey, focusing on the time difference involved:

These words were obiter dicta. Further, they appear in a judgement where the delay was one of four years. That is of an entirely different magnitude to the delay in this case of 29 years The obiter dicta was not enough to persuade the court that there was a wrongful conviction.

Judge Fennelly agreed:

In the nature of things a short delay might require only slight explanation. The judicial review time limit is not a limitation period. Prompt pursuit of remedy is, however a requirement of judicial review application.

Judge Denham also stated in the facts of the case what could be used to extend time of a claim. However, these rules are not exclusive:

^{(i)}"the nature of the order or actions the subject of the application;

^{(ii)}the conduct of the applicant;

^{(iii)} the conduct of the respondents;

^{(iv)} the effect of the order under review on the parties subsequent to the order being made and any steps taken by the parties subsequent to the order to be reviewed;

^{(v)}any effect which may have taken place on third parties by the order to be reviewed;

^{(vi)} public policy that proceedings relating to the public law domain take place promptly except when good reason is furnished."

Denham J conceded the actions that happened to De Roiste where serious and affected his life however his subsequent actions and delay in seeking relief justified the refusal of seeking an extension to judicial review.

== Subsequent developments ==
The De Róiste case was an important case in terms of its clear and unanimous decision by the Supreme Court as to what constitutes a considerable delay in bringing legal proceedings against a defendant. Any and all proceedings must be brought in a swift and timely manner.

== See also ==
Judicial review in the Republic of Ireland

Supreme Court of Ireland
