= O'Connell v The Turf Club =

Irish Supreme Court case

O'Connell & anor -v- The Turf Club
- Coat of arms of Ireland
- Court: Supreme Court of Ireland
- Full case name: O'Connell & anor -v- The Turf Club
- Decided: 25/06/2015
- Citation: IESC 57

Case history
- Appealed from: High Court
- Appealed to: Supreme Court

Court membership
- Judges sitting: Denham CJ, Murray J, Hardiman J, O'Donnell J, Dunne J

Case opinions
- Irish Supreme Court case which explored the scope of judicial review in Ireland.

Keywords
- Constitution; Judicial Review; Irish Horse Racing Board; Public law; Irish Supreme Court; Amenability to judicial review

O'Connell & anor v The Turf Club, [2015] IESC 57, [2017] 2 IR 43 is an Irish Supreme Court case which explored the scope of judicial review in Ireland. It addressed whether the decisions of a sport's organizing body should be amenable to judicial review. In deciding that it was, this decision became a useful reminder that it is not only bodies created by statute, which are generally considered to be subject to public law, that are amenable to Judicial Review by the Courts.

== Factual background ==
The Turf club (Respondent) was the Irish regulatory body for horse racing until the end of 2017. It established and enforced the rules of flat racing in Ireland. O'Connell (Appellant) was a professional jockey, and his co-appellant (Lambe) was a horse trainer. The Turf Club alleged that O'Connell failed to ride a horse called "Yachvilli" to its maximum ability in Downpatrick (Co Down) in 2011 which was contrary to the Rules of Racing.

The Turf club had then carried out an inquiry into an alleged suspicious betting pattern, the allegation being that the horse was prevented from running to its full ability. O'Connell and Anor were respectively interviewed by the respondent who served them with documents detailing their alleged breaches of the Rules of Racing with the possibility of sanctions. O'Connell and Lambe then instituted judicial review proceedings in the High Court.

O'Connell and Anor did not argue procedural unfairness or the misapplication of the horse racing rules but they challenged the very basis of the rules itself. They alleged that the governing statute, Irish Horse Racing Industry Act 1994 did not set out the principles and policies which outlined the powers of the club as required by Article 15.2.1 of the Irish Constitution. In effect they were seeking a declaration from the courts that the Turf's clubs enforcement of rules of racing were 'ultra vires'.

McGovern J, in his ruling had found that since the introduction of the Irish Horse Racing Act in 1994, the Turf club had the statutory duty to enforce the rules within the 32 counties. The High court held that the Turf club did not exercise a delegated legislative function nor did it perform a judicial one. They also found that O'Connell and Lambe had not established any grounds to allow the court to rule in their favor.

O'Connell then appealed that decision to the Supreme Court and the Turf Club cross appealed the judgement that its decisions are amenable to judicial review.

== Holding of the Supreme Court ==
Writing on behalf of the majority in the Supreme Court, O'Donnell J, held that the Turf club was amenable to judicial review and proceeded to dismiss the club's cross appeal. His reasoning behind this decision was narrowly expressed and stated that "it is clear that in the aftermath of the 1994 Act, the Turf Club as the Racing Regulatory Body is more clearly in the domain of public law than the Institute of Chartered Accountants was in Geoghegan v Institute of Chartered Accountants, and sufficiently within the field of public law and within the public domain, as to have the consequence that judicial review lies".

The Court had also made reference to the case Hyland v Dundalk Racing [2014] IEHC 60 when reaching their decision stating that "given that the Oireachtas has entrusted these functions by statute to those bodies [Racing Regulatory Body] in the public interest, this means that these bodies are, in principle, at least amenable to judicial review".

The Court also determined that the Horse Racing Industry Act 1994 had not changed the essential legal character of the Turf Club and did not render it a creature of legal statute. The Turf Club's ability to enforce compliance with its rules were grounded on the law of contract. The Courts also dismissed the appeal made by O'Connell and Lambe stating that the fundamental premise of which the appellants arguments' was based were false.

== See also ==
- Irish Horseracing Regulatory Board

- Public law
