= Irish court =

Irish court may refer to:

- Courts of the Republic of Ireland
- Courts of Northern Ireland
- Royal court of Ireland: see Kingdom of Ireland (1542–1800)
