= Dekra Eireann Teo v Minister of Environment =

Irish Supreme Court case

- Coat of arms of Ireland
- Court: Supreme Court of Ireland
- Citation: [2003] 2 IR 270; [2003] 2 ILRM 210; [2003] IESC 25

Court membership
- Judges sitting: Keane C.J., Denham J., McGuinness J, Fennelly J, Hardiman J

Case opinions
- Irish Supreme Court case in which the Court held that a key feature of both european law and consquequent court tules in regards to public procument contracts is the policy of urgency.

Keywords
- Court Rules; Judicial Review; Public Sector Projects; Constitutional Law; Administrative Law

Dekra Eireann Teo v Minister of Environment, [2003] 2 IR 270; [2003] 2 ILRM 210; [2003] IESC 25 is an Irish Supreme Court case in which it was decided that the earliest opportunity to apply for a review of a decision made by the court arises within the three-month period after the decision is made, and that courts have no power to extend that time. The Court held that a key feature of both European law and court rules is the policy of urgency.

== Background ==
=== Facts of case ===
Bidding for the National Car Test (NCT) system in Ireland opened in the late 1990s. In 1998 Noel Dempsey, then Minister of Environment and Local Government, award the contract to SGS Ireland ltd. Dekra, which had not been awarded the contract, issued judicial review proceedings against the Minister in March 1999 to challenge the decision.

=== High Court ===
In response SGS Ltd in June 1999, sought to strike out Dekra's proceedings for judicial review on the grounds that Dekra had not complied with three-month time limit prescribed under court rules. The High Court refused SGS application and exercised its discretion in favor for extending the time limit. This resulted in both SGS and the Minister appealing the High Court decision to the Supreme Court.

== Holding of the Supreme Court ==
The Supreme Court over-ruled the High Court and allowed the appeal from SGS and The Minister for Environment and Local Government.

Denham J stated it was clear that grounds for Dekra's application for leave to take judicial review proceedings existed by December 14 after the debriefing meeting and therefore the time for bringing the application ran from that date. However, Dekra did not issue proceedings until March 25, 1999, in turn failing to comply with the three month time limit in court rules.

Fennelly J also commented stating in litigation involving disputes between well-resourced corporate undertaking "there should be very little excuse for delay".

== Subsequent developments ==
The decision of this case was subsequently followed and approved in the supreme court case of O' Brien v Moriarty [2005] where Denham J remained of the view she expressed in this case.

== See also ==
Judicial review in the Republic of Ireland

Administration (law)

Constitution of Ireland
