= Edmund Honohan =

Irish barrister, Master of the High Court

Master of the High Court
- In office 14 May 2001 – 8 April 2022
- Nominated by: Government of Ireland
- Preceded by: Harry Hill
- Succeeded by: Vacant

Personal details
- Born: April 1952 (age 74)
- Education: King's Inns

Edmund Honohan (born April 1952) is an Irish barrister who was the Master of the High Court from 2001 to 2022.

== Early life ==
Honohan is from Glasnevin and is the brother of Patrick Honohan. He was called to the Bar in 1975 and became a senior counsel in 1995. He was involved with Fianna Fáil early in his career, where he assisted with the writing of the party's manifesto for the 1977 general election. Bertie Ahern was selected ahead of him to contest the 1977 election in Dublin Finglas. He advised the Minister for Economic Planning and Development Martin O'Donoghue between 1977 and 1979. He acted in cases involving company law, judicial review, chancery, employment law and personal injuries.

== Master of the High Court ==
He was interviewed for the position of Master of the High Court in 2001 and was appointed in May 2001. He succeeded Harry Hill. He unsuccessfully asked to be nominated to the European Court of Justice in 2008 and the Supreme Court of Ireland in 2014.

He criticised the regulation of solicitors in 2005. In 2018, he used a hammer to a break a window in the Four Courts due to his concerns over the ventilation in the Master's Court.

He retired in April 2022.

=== Debt cases ===
Since the post-2008 Irish economic downturn, much of his case load has involved debt enforcement and repossession cases, often dealing with up to 200 cases a week. According to the Business Post, he has been considered a "debtors' champion". The President of the High Court Peter Kelly transferred the hearing of motions to seek final judgment in debt enforcement proceedings from the Master to judges of the High Court in January 2019.

The High Court granted an injunction in 2014 restraining him from acting upon a referral he made to the Director of Public Prosecutions regarding alleged perjury by Allied Irish Banks in a debt recovery case. Iseult O'Malley later held in 2015 that he had no power to make such a referral and quashed his order to strike out the action.

In 2018, Honohan drafted the National Housing Co-Operative and Fair Mortgage Bill, which he provided to Fianna Fáil. It sought to stop the eviction of homeowners in arrears until the house was sold and to provide for co-operatives to purchase such houses.
