= Judiciary of Ireland =

Judiciary of Ireland may refer to:

- Courts of Northern Ireland
- Courts of the Republic of Ireland
