= Richard Johnson (judge) =

Irish judge (1937–2019)

President of the High Court
- In office 22 November 2006 – 7 October 2009
- Nominated by: Government of Ireland
- Appointed by: Mary McAleese
- Preceded by: Joseph Finnegan
- Succeeded by: Nicholas Kearns

Judge of the High Court
- In office 1 May 1987 – 7 October 2009
- Nominated by: Government of Ireland
- Appointed by: Patrick Hillery

Personal details
- Born: 27 October 1937 Blennerville, County Kerry, Ireland
- Died: 4 August 2019 (aged 81) Merrion Road, Dublin, Ireland
- Spouse: Nuala Johnson (m. 1969)
- Children: 4
- Education: University College Dublin; King's Inns

Richard Johnson (27 October 1937 – 4 August 2019) was an Irish judge who served as President of the High Court from 2006 to 2009 and a Judge of the High Court from 1987 to 2009.

Johnson was also under the terms of the Constitution of Ireland by that office an ex-officio member of the Supreme Court. In the absence of the Chief Justice, he acted as a member of the Presidential Commission.

Johnson was born in Blennerville, County Kerry, and studied law at University College Dublin (UCD). He qualified as a barrister at the King's Inns in 1960. He practised on the South Western Circuit (Kerry, Limerick and Clare) until he became Senior Counsel in 1977. As a Senior Counsel, he practised on the Munster Circuit and in Dublin until 1987. He was appointed a High Court judge in 1987. His father was a district court judge for several years and his son and daughter are barristers. The Government of Ireland nominated Justice Nicholas Kearns on 7 October 2009 to replace him as President of the High Court.

After his retirement as president and a judge, he gave an interview to the media in which he suggested the legislature should revisit the issue of whether the death penalty should be allowed as punishment for particularly serious crimes, such as murder committed in the course of armed robbery. Mayor of Limerick Kevin Kiely supported the proposal as a response to the continuing increase in murders in Ireland.

Johnson died in Merrion Road, Dublin on 4 August 2019, at the age of 81.

Legal offices
Preceded by Joseph Finnegan	President of the High Court; 2006–2009	Succeeded by Nicholas Kearns
