= Adrienne Cullen =

Irish campaigner for medical justice (1960–2018)

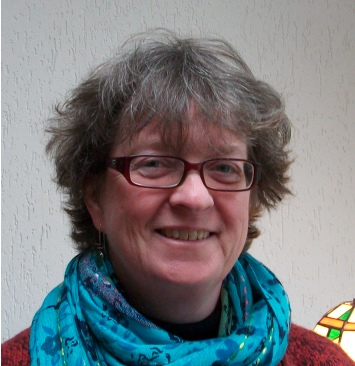
- Born: 9 November 1960; County Sligo, Ireland
- Died: 31 December 2018 (aged 58)
- Occupations: Journalist and editor
- Known for: Public campaign after her cancer test results were lost

Adrienne M. Cullen (9 November 1960 – 31 December 2018) was an Irish journalist, editor and healthcare campaigner who died in the Netherlands aged 58, after a university hospital, UMC Utrecht, admitted losing test results in 2011 showing she had cervical cancer. The hospital initiated an investigation into the medical mistake and in 2019 published the investigation report and hospital's reflection on it.

== Early life and education ==
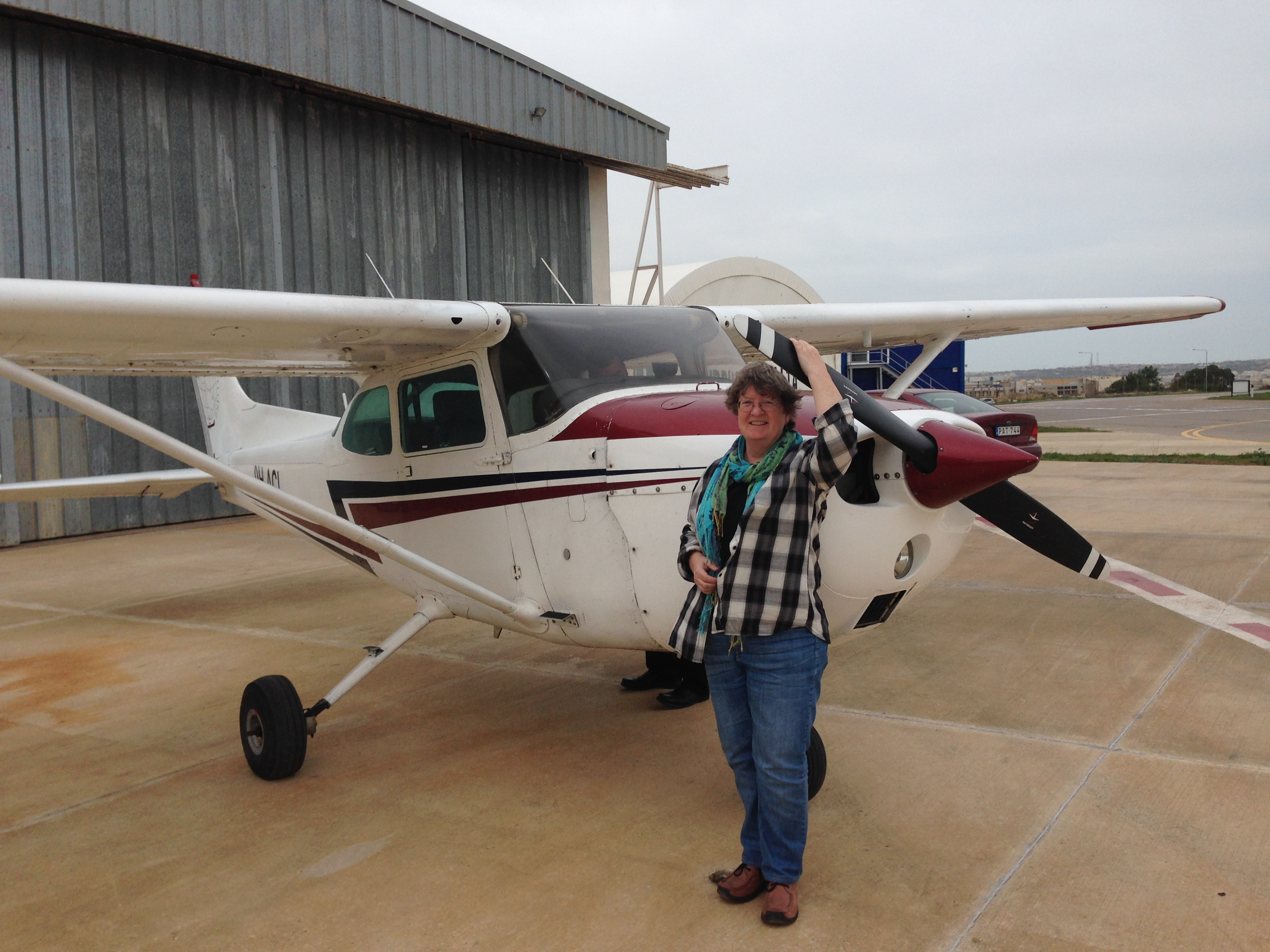
About to fly over Malta in an ancient Cessna

Adrienne Cullen was born in County Sligo, on 9 November 1960, to pharmacist, Sean Cullen and Margaret (Peg) Cullen (née Carroll). She graduated with a BA (Hons) in Sociology and Philosophy from University College Cork.

== Career ==
In 1991 Cullen was a freelance journalist, and published a book Thursday's Child: the Romanian Adoptions Story, having also reported on Romanian topics for The Irish Press and The Cork Examiner.

== Campaign for open disclosure by hospitals ==
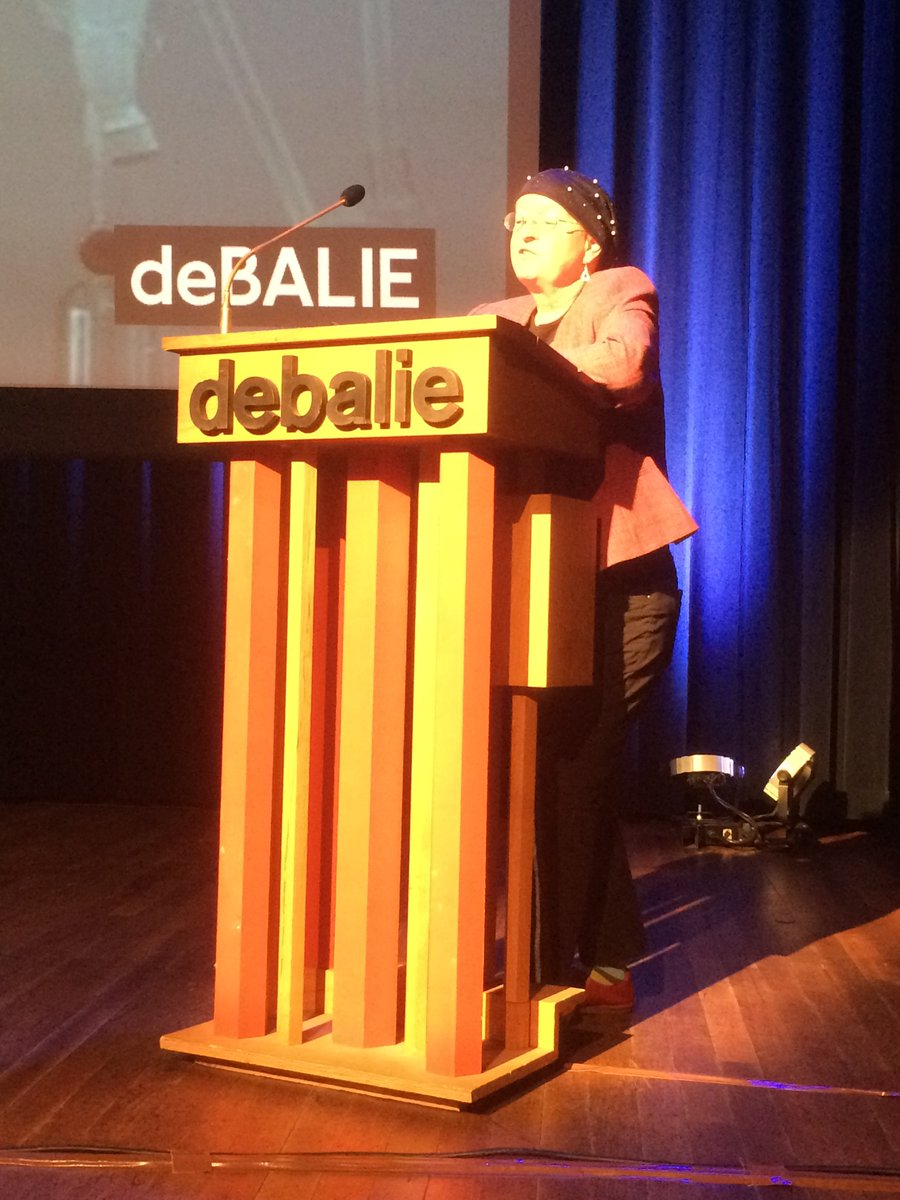
Adrienne Cullen speaking about open disclosure after medical harm, and the unacceptability of gagging clauses in medical settlements

After she had been treated at UMC Utrecht in 2011, Adrienne Cullen's test results went missing, only resurfacing two years later. The results diagnosed Cullen with cervical cancer. Only after a prolonged public campaign did the hospital investigate how the results went missing and offer Cullen an apology, although by then her condition had become terminal.

In the following years, although increasingly ill, Cullen was a vocal campaigner in the Netherlands for mandatory open disclosure by hospitals when patients are damaged in the course of their treatment. She revealed the inadequate systems and deep-rooted culture in hospitals that can lead them to act in ways that are self-protecting rather than in the best interests of their patients.

Adrienne Cullen became an activist and public speaker on disclosure of medical errors by hospitals. Among many other public occasions, she spoke at De Balie in Amsterdam in October 2018, and at a TedX talk in The Hague the following month. Cullen also campaigned to have gagging clauses (non-disclosure agreements) banned across the European Union in medical settlements with publicly funded hospitals. There was positive talk about both but no action.

As the Dutch newspaper, NRC, observed in the heading on its obituary, written by its health editor, Frederiek Weeda, and published the day she died: “Staying silent was not an option for Adrienne Cullen (1960–2018)."

The Irish national broadcaster, RTE, paid tribute on its prime daily news programme, Morning Ireland, on 2 January 2019. In a moving video interview with the Dutch patient welfare organisation, Patiëntenstem, Cullen explained why she campaigned despite her illness. She also spoke on video for The Irish Times in Dublin.

Adrienne Cullen was the first patient in the Netherlands ever to receive an apology in writing from the CEO of the hospital that had harmed her. That apology came from Professor Margriet Schneider from UMC Utrecht.

Deny, Dismiss, Dehumanise: What Happened When I Went to Hospital (ISBN 978-9065232236), her book detailing her experiences in the Dutch healthcare system, was published in English by Dutch publisher, Uitgeverij van Brug on 25 March 2019. In his preface to the book, Dr Arie Franx argued that Cullen brought to the fore "...the many lessons to be learnt ... not just by doctors and hospitals, but by patients themselves, by healthcare regulators, and by legislators."

Covering the launch by whistleblower Dutch surgeon, Dr Volkert Wreesmann, The Irish Times said that the then Dutch prime minister, Mark Rutte, had described her death as "indescribably tragic", in a letter to Cullen's widower, the Irish foreign correspondent Peter Cluskey.

In July 2019, King Willem-Alexander of the Netherlands, on a state visit to Ireland with Queen Maxima, held a brief private meeting with Cluskey on the fringes of a performance by the Netherlands Dance Theatre in Dublin. This was reported by the Dutch state broadcaster, NOS. Cluskey wrote an account of the encounter in The Irish Times, some days later.

For her courage and persistence, Cullen was conferred with an Honorary Doctorate in Laws by her alma mater, University College, Cork, in Ireland, three weeks to the day before she died.

In an article published by the Royal Dutch Medical Association (KNMG) discussing new legislation on medical mistakes, the chair of the KNMG praised Cullen's campaign, using it as an example of the importance of openness by hospitals when dealing with cases of damage to patients as a result of their treatment.

== The Adrienne Cullen Lectures ==
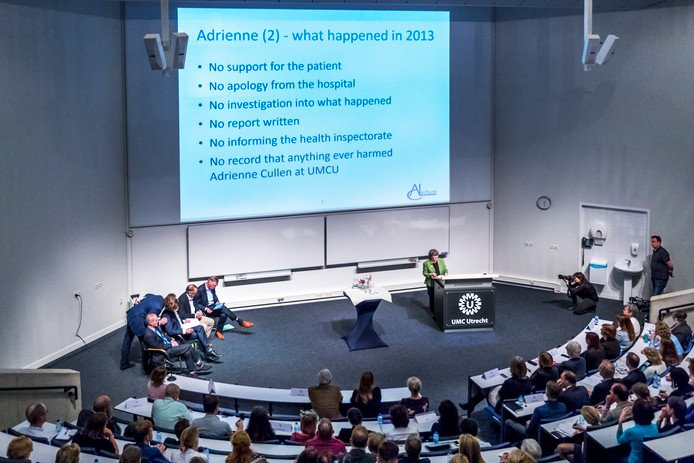
Adrienne speaking at the first Adrienne Cullen Symposium on Open Disclosure after Medical Harm in April 2018.

An annual lecture named the Adrienne Cullen Lecture on Open Disclosure After Medical Harm was established by the hospital in memory of Adrienne Cullen. The hospital states that "This lecture is named in her honour so that as a hospital we learn from things that go wrong, patients feel better supported, and through openness prevent similar mistakes from being made again."

In April 2018, Adrienne Cullen was joined by two of her senior doctors, Arie Franx, a divisional director at UMC Utrecht, and his colleague, Huub van der Vaart, head of gynaecology, to deliver the first Adrienne Cullen lecture – which was heavily critical of the hospital. It is possibly for that reason that no recording of the lecture, audio or video, was permitted.

That first lecture was attended by the Irish ambassador to the Netherlands, Kevin Kelly; the director-general of the Netherlands healthcare inspectorate, Ronnie van Dieman; the CEO of UMC Utrecht, Margriet Schneider; representatives of the country's seven university hospitals, and by many friends and former colleagues. The lecture became controversial when UMC Utrecht officials refused to allow Dutch investigative journalist, Ton van der Ham, to enter the lecture theatre and he was taken away by police while waiting. An official investigation found five years later than Van der Ham had done nothing wrong. A video clip recorded by Adrienne with Van der Ham for his employers, BNNVARA, was crucial in that finding.

As of April 2025, UMC had hosted seven such lectures covering a number of topics related to open disclosure and patients' rights. The 2025 lecture took place on 7 April 2025 on the theme 'Difficult decisions and their aftermath: a call for openness'. Recordings of this lecture and the others in the series (apart from the first one) are available on the UMC Utrecht website in English and Dutch.

The 2026 lecture - 'Investigating errors in healthcare to the bone, but not to the heart'- took place on 4 June. For the first time since it moved online during Covid, the auditorium at UMCU was packed with doctors, students and families of those affected by such cases. In addition, more than 150 people attended online in Ireland, the UK, the US, the Netherlands and as far away as Japan.

The Irish ambassador in The Hague, Dr Ann Derwin, and her deputy, Ms Louise Hartigan attended the lecture in person. Afterwards, Ambassador Derwin spoke to the event's organiser, Dr Marcel Albers, and impressed on him that the embassy hoped to see the symposium in Adrienne's memory continued into the future as a tribute to her campaign for increased openness by hospitals in cases where patients have been damaged or worse.

== Vicky Phelan and the CervicalCheck scandal ==
Cullen wrote about the striking similarities with the CervicalCheck scandal in Ireland in a piece entitled "Vicky Phelan, cancer and me" – and Phelan, in turn, penned a review of Cullen's book. In an article in the Irish Times, she described Cullen's end as "another needless death".

== Personal life ==
Cullen was married to Irish journalist Peter Cluskey. In 2023 he was awarded a PhD by Dublin City University, and dedicated his thesis, "The Co-evolution of Networked Terrorism and Information Technology", to Cullen.

Cullen lived in the suburb of Voorschoten, near The Hague, until her death, at the Netherlands Cancer Institute in Amsterdam, on 31 December 2018.

== Recognition ==
Cullen was awarded an honorary doctorate of laws (LLD) by University College Cork in 2018.

== Selected publications ==
- Cullen, Adrienne (2019) Deny, Dismiss, Dehumanise: What Happened When I Went to Hospital. Uitgeverij van Brug. ISBN 9789065232236
- Cullen, Adrienne (1991) Thursday's Child: The Romanian Adoptions Story. Kildanore Press. ISBN 1872455166
