= CervicalCheck cancer scandal =

Cancer misdiagnosis scandal in Ireland

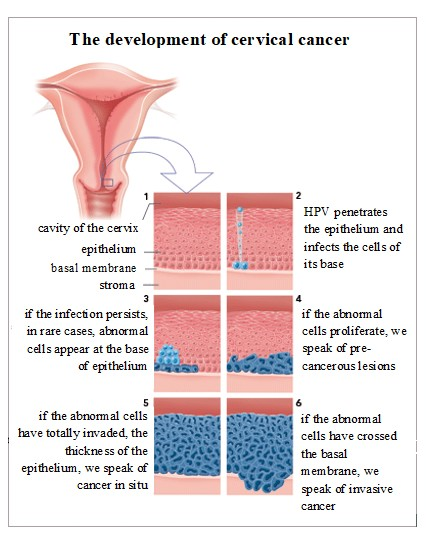
The development of cervical cancer

The CervicalCheck cancer scandal first emerged in 2018 and involved several women in Ireland suing the Health Service Executive (HSE) after they received incorrect smear test results for the presence of precancerous cervical cells.

== Background ==
In 2011, Vicky Phelan, a mother of two children from Annacotty, County Limerick, underwent a smear test for cervical cancer. Although her test showed no abnormalities, she was diagnosed with cervical cancer in 2014. An internal CervicalCheck review found the original result to be incorrect, but Phelan was not informed of this fact until 2017. She sued Clinical Pathology Laboratories Inc, Austin, Texas, over the incorrect test. The case was settled for €2.5 million without admission of liability. Fourteen other women in the 2014 review were also found to have 'false-negative' test results.

On 26 April 2018 the HSE confirmed that 206 women had developed cervical cancer after having a misdiagnosed CervicalCheck smear test. Of these, 162 had not been told that the initial results were incorrect. Dr Gráinne Flannelly, CervicalCheck's clinical director, stepped down on 28 April. A week earlier it was reported that Dr Flannelly had in 2017 advised a gynaecologist not to advise women about the re-evaluated test results, but to file the results instead.

In May 2018, HSE director-general Tony O'Brien took temporary leave of absence from the board of a US medical company amid renewed calls for him to stand aside from his position due to the ongoing scandal. Tony O'Brien announced his resignation as director-general of the HSE with effect from close of business on 11 May.

Emma Mhic Mhathúna, a terminally ill mother of five children who was one of the women given an inaccurate negative test made national media headlines in May, including an interview on Morning Ireland. Appearing on The Late Late Show, she called for the HSE to be "dismantled and reassembled". Mhic Mhathúna died on 7 October 2018.

Vicky Phelan, a terminally ill mother of two children, whose legal case against the state was one of the catalysts for the publication of the controversy, was named as one of the BBC's 100 Women in 2018. In February 2022, Phelan was awarded the Freedom of Limerick in recognition of her role in the CervicalCheck campaign. Phelan died on 14 November 2022, at the age of 48.

Increased scrutiny into BreastCheck and BowelScreen has followed from this controversy.

The most recent incident of a terminally-ill mother being awarded compensation for the CervicalCheck controversy was in January 2021 when a 46-year-old woman had a settlement agreed.

== Scoping inquiry ==
In response to the controversy, the Irish Department of Health announced on 8 May 2018 that a scoping inquiry was being established, to be carried out by Gabriel Scally.

On 12 September 2018 the Department of Health published Dr Scally's final report. The report gathered testimony from women and families affected by the scandal, and conducted an investigation and audit of the CervicalCheck programme. It also contained 50 recommendations covering access to medical records, governance of CervicalCheck, procurement of laboratory services and revision of the HSE's open disclosure policy.

On 12 December 2018, Minister for Health Simon Harris published an implementation plan based on Dr Scally's report. The plan set out 126 actions arising from the report's recommendations. Announcing an independent review of the plan, Minister Harris said:

I welcome [Dr Scally's] initial assessment of this Plan and his confirmation that he is satisfied that all parties are taking seriously his findings and recommendations, that resources have been allocated to take the work forward at a high level of priority, and that the proposed work programme is impressive in its commitment to making rapid progress.

== Tribunal ==
The Government announced its intention to establish an independent statutory Tribunal into claims related to CervicalCheck in December 2018, initially chaired by Mary Irvine, a Judge of the Supreme Court of Ireland. The form of the Tribunal was proposed by Charles Meenan. The CervicalCheck Tribunal Act 2019 was signed into law in July 2019.

The Tribunal hears claims from women affected by CervicalCheck without going to court, though is voluntary and does not prohibit women from pursuing their claims in court. Its hearings are in private. Its function is to make compensation decisions related to CervicalCheck. It also has powers to make recommendations, compel witnesses, put procedures in place and hold meetings. The eligible women for the Tribunal are those who were originally identified in the review, women who could not have their sides reviewed by reasons beyond their control and other categories of women who received diagnoses of cervical cancer.

The COVID-19 pandemic delayed the commencement of the Tribunal until after July 2020. The final composition of the three-judge panel for the Tribunal was announced as being chairperson Ann Power of the Court of Appeal and ordinary members Brian McGovern and Tony O'Connor.

== Adrienne Cullen and the campaign for open disclosure in hospitals in the Netherlands ==
In an article in The Irish Times, journalist and fellow Irishwoman Adrienne Cullen drew parallels between Vicky Phelan's campaign and her own campaign for open disclosure by hospitals. Cullen died in the Netherlands in 2018 after her cervical cancer diagnosis was 'lost' by the hospital treating her. She fought a campaign in the Netherlands to ensure that hospitals gave full disclosure to patients damaged in the course of their treatment.
