= Tony O'Connor (judge) =

Irish barrister, High Court judge since 2015

The Hon. Mr. Justice Tony O'Connor
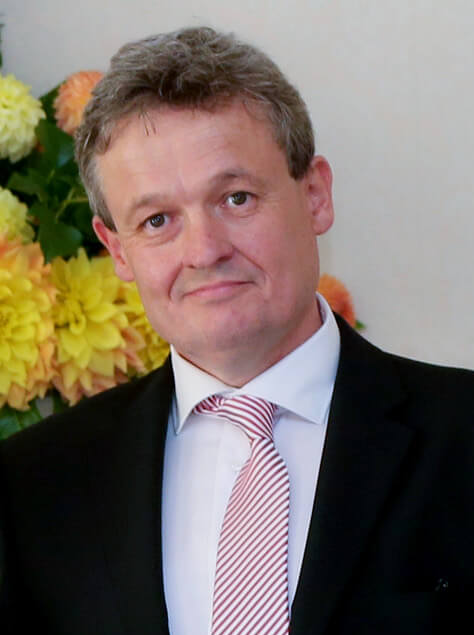
- O'Connor in 2015

Judge of the High Court
- Incumbent
- Assumed office 1 October 2015
- Nominated by: Government of Ireland
- Appointed by: Michael D. Higgins

Personal details
- Born: Swinford, County Mayo, Ireland
- Education: University College Dublin; Trinity College Dublin; Law Society of Ireland; King's Inns

Tony O'Connor is an Irish judge who has served as a Judge of the High Court since October 2015. He began his legal career as a commercial solicitor, before becoming a barrister in 1991.

== Early life ==
O'Connor comes from a legal family, with his father and grandfather having run a firm of solicitors in Swinford, County Mayo.

He was educated at University College Dublin, Trinity College Dublin, the Law Society of Ireland and the King's Inns.

== Legal career ==
He first worked as a solicitor, qualifying in November 1983. He qualified at and worked for Arthur Cox Solicitors. He was later a legal adviser in Aer Lingus and a solicitor at Rory O'Donnell & Co. Solicitors. His expertise was in competition law and mergers and acquisitions. He authored a text on competition law in 1996.

O'Connor was admitted to the Bar of Ireland in 1991 and became a senior counsel in 2006. He had experience across civil, commercial and EU law. He has also acted in cases involving constitutional law and personal injuries. He appeared for the State against Ali Charaf Damache and acted for Irish Nationwide Building Society. O'Connor also acted in maritime and fishing cases such as Gannon.

He became an accredited mediator in 2009. He has been the chair of the Aviation Appeals Panel and Mental Health Tribunals. From 2007, he acted as legal assessor for hearings of the Medical Council, Nursing Board, Dental Council and Pharmaceutical Society of Ireland. He also wrote about assisted human reproduction.

O'Connor was a council member of Concern Worldwide. He gave evidence to Seanad Éireann in 2013 regarding the Protection of Life During Pregnancy Act 2013.

== Judicial career ==
O'Connor was appointed to the High Court in October 2015. He has heard cases involving tax law, extradition, insolvency, injunctions, defamation, personal injuries, and commercial disputes.

O’Connor heard a case in 2015 relating to a truck driver who was alleged by Greek authorities to have had contraband cigarettes among his consignment of olive oil when his truck was inspected in 2002. The truck driver was told over 10 years later that he owed €1.5 million to the Greek authorities, which the Irish revenue was obliged to collect under EU law. O’Connor referred the case to the European Court of Justice under the preliminary reference procedure. The ECJ in 2018 answered the questions posed and, in May 2018, O’Connor granted a declaration that the Irish Revenue could not fulfil the request of the Greek authorities to recover the sum sought.

In 2018, he found for Graham Dwyer, the man convicted of the murder of Elaine O'Hara, ruling that the legislation relied on to secure his conviction was contrary to EU law. The decision was appealed to the Supreme Court of Ireland, which in turn made a reference to the European Court of Justice.

He is a member of the board of the Courts Service.

In July 2020, he was appointed as a member of a three-judge tribunal into the CervicalCheck cancer scandal with chairperson Ann Power and retired judge Brian McGovern. O'Connor continued hearing cases in the High Court during his time on the tribunal.

O’Connor delivered judgment for the Court of Appeal in April 2022 which clarified the application of principles under the 2004 EU Citizens Directive. In December 2022, he awarded €365,000 to a factory worker who had sustained a back injury.

In 2023, O'Connor presided over the jury trial of a claim by a woman relating to sexual abuse she experienced as a teen. That same year, he held that the Health Service Executive did not owe a duty of care to parents in a case about information given in advance of their daughter's death from cervical cancer. In July 2023, O'Connor finalised the application by a claimant against the Christian Brothers for recovery of damages for child sex abuse.

In 2024, he presided over the jury trial of Jimmy Guerin's defamation claim against Gemma O'Doherty and gave rulings about further publication. Later that year, O'Connor refused an application to suspend the deliberations by a jury in an inquest into the fatal Stardust fire.

As designated judge, he reported to the Taoiseach that there was "widespread evidence" of criminal organisations using encrypted communications on social media and messaging services to avoid detection.
