= Frederick Morris =

President of the High Court
- In office 14 January 1998 – 1 December 2001
- Nominated by: Government of Ireland
- Appointed by: Mary McAleese
- Preceded by: Declan Costello
- Succeeded by: Joseph Finnegan

Judge of the High Court
- In office 1 August 1990 – 1 December 2001
- Nominated by: Government of Ireland
- Appointed by: Mary Robinson

Personal details
- Born: 1 December 1929 (age 96) Kilkenny, Ireland
- Party: Fianna Fáil
- Education: University College Dublin; King's Inns

Frederick Reginald Morris (born 1 December 1929) is a retired Irish judge who served as President of the High Court from 1998 to 2001 and a Judge of the High Court from 1990 to 2001.

Born in Kilkenny in 1929, he was called to the bar in 1959 and became a Senior Counsel in 1973. He was made a High Court judge in 1990 and appointed to the Special Criminal Court the following year. He was President of the High Court from 1998 to 2001, and therefore an ex-officio member of the Supreme Court of Ireland. He was the Chairperson of the Referendum Commission in 2002 for the 25th Amendment Bill 2002.

From 2002 to 2008, he was the chairman and Sole Member of the Morris Tribunal, which investigated allegations of corrupt and dishonest policing in County Donegal.

Legal offices
Preceded by Declan Costello	President of the High Court; 1998–2001	Succeeded by Joseph Finnegan
