= Brian McGovern (judge) =

Irish judge

Judge of the Court of Appeal
- In office 28 June 2018 – 15 March 2020
- Nominated by: Government of Ireland
- Appointed by: Michael D. Higgins

Judge of the High Court
- In office 11 March 2006 – 25 June 2018
- Nominated by: Government of Ireland
- Appointed by: Mary McAleese

Personal details
- Education: University College Dublin; King's Inns

Brian J. McGovern is a retired Irish judge who served as a Judge of the Court of Appeal from June 2018 to March 2020 and a Judge of the High Court from 2007 to 2010.

== Early life ==
McGovern attended Castleknock College and obtained a BCL from University College Dublin in 1971. He attended the King's Inns and was called to the Bar in 1972. He became a senior counsel in 1991. During his career as a barrister he frequently practiced in areas of both criminal and civil law. He served as President of the Irish Maritime Law Association. He represented Total S.A. in an inquiry into the Whiddy Island disaster.

== Judicial career ==
=== High Court ===
He was appointed to the High Court in 2006. Soon after his appointment he heard a case regarding the right of access of a woman to frozen embryos against the wishes of her husband. He acted as the designated arbitration judge for Ireland until his appointment to the Court of Appeal. He was also the presiding judge in the specialist Commercial Court. In the Commercial Court, he was the trial judge for high-profile disputes involving Rory McIlroy, Gay Byrne and Mick Wallace.

=== Court of Appeal ===
McGovern was appointed to the Court of Appeal in June 2018. He retired as a judge in March 2020.

=== CervicalCheck Tribunal ===
Following his retirement, he continues to serve in a judicial function as a member of the three-judge statutory tribunal into matters arising from the CervicalCheck cancer scandal with chairperson Ann Power and Tony O'Connor.
