= Patricia Ryan (judge) =

Irish judge

The Hon. Ms. Justice Patricia Ryan

President of the Circuit Court
- In office 13 July 2019 – 12 July 2026
- Nominated by: Government of Ireland
- Appointed by: Michael D. Higgins
- Preceded by: Raymond Groarke
- Succeeded by: Keenan Johnson

Judge of the Circuit Court
- Incumbent
- Assumed office 2 July 2002
- Nominated by: Government of Ireland
- Appointed by: Mary McAleese

Personal details
- Spouse: Brian Lenihan Jnr (m. 1987; died 2011)
- Children: 2
- Education: University College Dublin; King's Inns

Patricia Ryan is an Irish judge who served as President of the Circuit Court from 2019 to 2026 and has been a Judge of the Circuit Court since July 2002.

== Early life ==
Ryan attended University College Dublin and the King's Inns. She was called to the Irish Bar in 1984. She acted in cases including those involving personal injuries.

She was appointed a vice-chairperson of the Employment Appeals Tribunal in 1998 and was re-appointed in 2001.

== Judicial career ==
=== Circuit Court ===
Ryan was nominated to the Circuit Court in June 2002 and appointed in July 2002. She has presided over criminal law trials involving dangerous driving, manslaughter, fraud, sexual offences, theft, harassment, health and safety law, and drugs offences.

She sat on the Special Criminal Court.

=== President of the Circuit Court ===
She became the President of the Circuit Court in July 2019.

== Personal life ==
Ryan married Brian Lenihan Jnr in 1987 with whom she had two children. Lenihan died in 2011.
