= Courts of the Republic of Ireland =

Judiciary of the Republic of Ireland

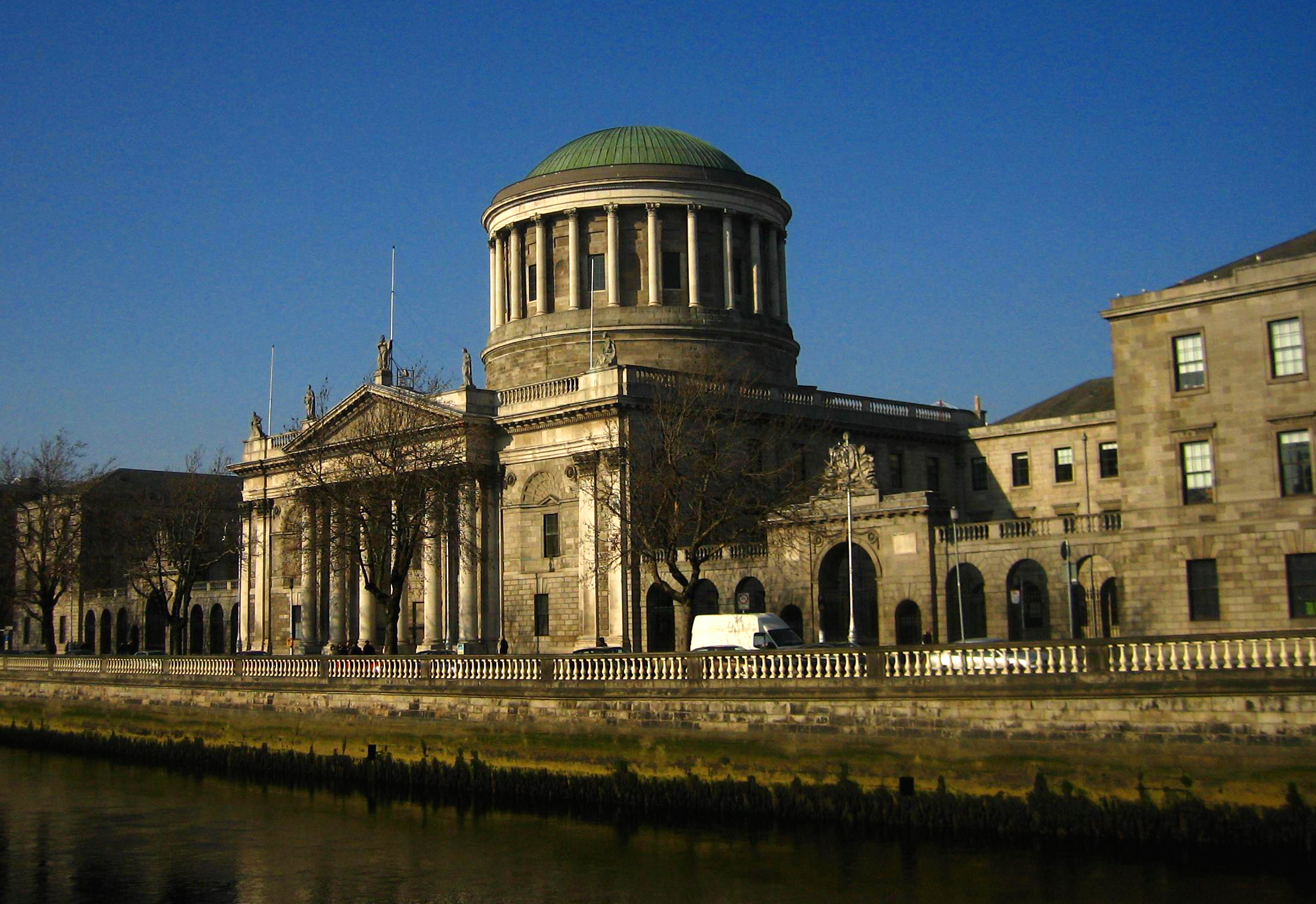
The Four Courts in Dublin, home to the Supreme Court and High Court

The Courts of Ireland consist of the Supreme Court, the Court of Appeal, the High Court, the Circuit Court, the District Court and the Special Criminal Court. With the exception of the Special Criminal Court, all courts exercise both civil and criminal jurisdiction, although when the High Court is exercising its criminal jurisdiction it is known as the Central Criminal Court.

The courts apply the laws of Ireland. There are four sources of law in Ireland: the Constitution, European Union law, statute law and the common law. Under the Constitution, trials for serious offences must usually be held before a jury. Except in exceptional circumstances, court hearings must occur in public. The High Court, the Court of Appeal, and the Supreme Court have authority, by means of judicial review, to determine the compatibility of the common law and statute law with the Constitution. Similarly, the courts may determine the compatibility of the common law with statute law.

== Introduction ==
The current system of courts is provided for in Article 34 of the Constitution of Ireland of 1937. However, it was not until the Courts (Establishment and Constitution) Act 1961 became law that this system took effect. Between 1937 and 1961 the courts provided for by the Constitution of the Irish Free State and the Courts of Justice Act 1924 continued their work under the Transitory Provisions of the Constitution of 1937, in which Articles 34 to 37 deal with the administration of justice generally.

The Courts Service Act 1998 created the Courts Service to manage the courts and associated property, and provide assistance and facilities to their users, including judges. The Courts Service also provides information to the public. The Board of the Courts Service, which oversees policy formulation and implementation, is headed by a chief executive officer. Judges of the courts are independent of the service in their judicial functions and are in that capacity paid by the state and not the service.

== The courts ==
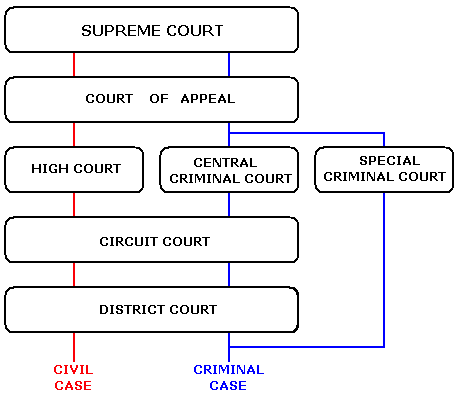
A simplified diagram of the courts system

=== Superior courts ===
The Supreme Court, the Court of Appeal, and the High Court are provided for in the Constitution. The Supreme Court of Ireland is defined as the Court of Final Appeal, but usually hears appeals only on points of law. Its decisions as to the interpretation of the Constitution and the law are final. The Court of Appeal and the High Court also have authority to interpret the Constitution. The High Court also tries the most serious criminal and civil cases, and hears certain appeals from lower courts. When the high court sits as a criminal court it is called the Central Criminal Court and sits with a jury.

The High Court includes a Commercial Court division that "deals with all types of business dispute including breach of contract, tort, property, trust and probate, IT disputes, judicial review, corporate mergers, global restructuring, insurance portfolio transfers, International Swaps and Derivatives or other investment disputes, and intellectual property disputes."

The Court of Appeal is the newest of the superior courts having been established in 2014. It took over the former appellate jurisdiction of the Supreme Court (in civil appeals from the High Court), and the jurisdiction of the former Court of Criminal Appeal (in criminal appeals from the High Court and the Circuit Court).

=== Lower courts ===
The Supreme Court, the Court of Appeal, and the High Court are the only courts specifically required by the Constitution. Other courts are established by law. Beneath the superior courts are the Circuit Court and the District Court. The Circuit Court deals with matters that must be tried before a jury. The District Court deals only with minor matters that may be tried summarily.

The Constitution provides for only two institutions in which a serious crime may be tried in the absence of a jury: a military tribunal, and a special court established by law to try serious offences whenever this is considered to be in the interests of justice or public order. Such a court has been established in the form of the Special Criminal Court, which has been used to try those accused of being members of paramilitary organisations such as the Provisional IRA, or of leading organised crime.

=== Family Court ===
The Family Court is a division of the District, Circuit and High Courts that deals with family law matters. It has historically been the subject of criticisms, which have led to its procedures being included in the Third Programme for Law Reform, as well as the attempted implementation of new procedures. According to Mark Garrett, director general of Ireland's Law Society, these reforms began to take place in the 1970s. One of the Reform's principal aims is the establishment of a Family District Court, a Family Circuit Court, and a Family High Court as divisions of the existing District Court, Circuit Court and High Court. In November 2022, Justice Minister Helen McEntee produced the Family Courts Bill 2022, which sought to establish a Family Law Court complex at Hammond Lane in Dublin's legal quarter. In the following year, Justice Minister Simon Harris hoped that the addition of 24 judges would accelerate this process.

In principle, all hearings are in camera and reporting is anonymous, restricted and issued quarterly by a single journalist.

== Judges ==
=== Appointment ===
Judges are appointed by the President of Ireland, acting on the binding advice of the Government. The Government acts on the advice of the Judicial Appointments Advisory Board who submit a list of seven recommended candidates. However the Government is not bound to follow the advice of the Board and may decide to appoint other qualified individuals. The Board advertises vacant positions but does not seek out candidates or conduct interviews.

Traditionally Superior and Circuit Court judges were barristers before being appointed to the bench, while District Court judges were solicitors. Michael White became the first solicitor to be appointed to the Circuit Court in 1996 and Michael Peart became the first solicitor to appointed to the High Court in 2002. White was made a High Court judge in 2011.

Judicial appointments are frequently thought to be politically motivated. In an interview in the Autumn 2012 edition of The Parchment, Peter Kelly, head of the Commercial Court and head of the Association of Judges of Ireland said the appointments to the Supreme Court were "purely political". He went on to say the creation of the Judicial Appointments Advisory Board (JAAB) in 1996 "was done to create the semblance of independence as to how judges were appointed" but "the JAAB by common consent, doesn't really work". He continued "We all know of cases of people who would be excellent judicial appointments and are passed over in favour of people who are not so well qualified." He called for an independent body to appoint judges. In 2015 Mr Justice Kelly was appointed by the government as President of the High Court.

=== Remuneration ===
The Constitution originally mandated that judicial salaries could not be reduced as long as they remain in office. However, in 2011 the Twenty-ninth Amendment of the Constitution of Ireland inserted a clause allowing which provides that:

"Where, before or after the enactment of this section, reductions have been or are made by law to the remuneration of persons belonging to classes of persons whose remuneration is paid out of public money and such law states that those reductions are in the public interest, provision may also be made by law to make proportionate reductions to the remuneration of judges."

In O'Byrne v Minister for Finance (1959), the Supreme Court had previously found that an increase in income tax which reduced judicial pay did not violate the constitutional prohibition on the reduction of judicial pay.

=== Removal and resignation ===
The procedure for removing a judge of the Supreme Court, the Court of Appeal, or the High Court from office is specified in the Constitution, but by law the same mechanism applies to judges of the lower courts. A judge may be removed from office only for "stated misbehaviour or incapacity" and only if a joint resolution is adopted by both houses of the Oireachtas. After such a resolution is approved the judge is dismissed by the President. No judge has been removed from office since the foundation of the state in 1922.

In 1999 then Chief Justice Hamilton reported on the interventions of two judges, Justice Hugh O'Flaherty of the Supreme Court and Justice Cyril Kelly of the High Court, in the early release of Philip Sheedy, who had been convicted of causing death by dangerous driving. The Chief Justice described their actions as inappropriate and unwise. Following strong political reaction, and facing an Oireachtas debate on the report and a request by the executive to resign, both judges resigned. In their resignation statements they said they had done nothing wrong, but were resigning "to restore faith in the judicial system".

In 2004 a motion to impeach a Circuit Court judge, Brian Curtin, was launched in the Dáil, the first time such a move has been made. This followed strong public reaction to his acquittal on charges of possession of child pornography, due to evidence seized by gardaí being ruled inadmissible, and the judge's refusal of a Government request to resign. The Dáil established a joint committee to consider the evidence and report to the Dáil, a process that was upheld by the Supreme Court following a challenge by the judge. In November 2006, facing questioning by the committee, Judge Curtin resigned on health grounds, ending the impeachment process.

=== First judge convicted of a serious crime ===
On 20 November 2012, District Court judge Heather Perrin became the first judge in the history of Ireland to be convicted of a serious criminal offence. The jury found her guilty of deception by unanimous decision, the crime being committed while she was still a practising solicitor, a month before she was appointed to the judiciary. She subsequently resigned as a judge.

== See also ==
- Assize Court
- Judiciary
- Court
