= Tony O'Connor (composer) =

- Birth name: Tony Michael O'Connor
- Born: 15 March 1961
- Died: 23 May 2010 (aged 49) Mapleton, Queensland, Australia
- Genres: Instrumental; new age; meditation
- Occupations: Composer; musician; producer
- Instruments: Guitar; piano; flute; synthesisers; oboe; electric wind instrument
- Years active: 1987–2007
- Labels: Studio Horizon/Steve Parish; Studio Horizon/Didgeridoo
- Website: tonyoconnor.com.au

Tony Michael O'Connor (15 March 1961 – 23 May 2010) was an Australian composer, producer and performer of instrumental, new-age music. His music has sold over three and a half million copies worldwide, releasing his debut album in 1987 and his last in 2007.

O'Connor also composed music scores for film and television and is one of Australia's biggest selling instrumental musicians. His music sometimes utilises sounds from nature, and is very much focused on relaxation and what he called music therapy. His album, Mariner (1990), reached No. 40 on the ARIA Albums Chart in March 1993. Tony O'Connor died on 23 May 2010, due to a glioblastoma multiforme. He is survived by his life partner, Jacqui O'Connor and their child, Samantha Jane.

== Biography ==
Tony O'Connor was born in 1961. BT Fasmer of New Age Music Guide observed, "Nature was very important to Tony. He used nature sounds quite heavily in his music, which added both life and context. He even stopped songs in the middle to feature nature sounds. For him birds singing or sounds of waves had a special musical quality... His music will be of special interest for fans of Medwyn Goodall and Clifford White, which both debuted in the late 1980s." In the mid-1980s O'Connor moved to the Sunshine Coast hinterland with his then-girlfriend Jacqui O'Rourke

O'Connor's first album, Journey was released in 1987, classified as "Creative Relaxation Music". O'Connor had previously worked with psychologists and masseurs to create music that was specifically produced to calm and relax the listener. As a result of the album's medicinal qualities, to relieve stress, depression, sleeplessness, and muscle tension, as well as to slow the heart and breathe rate of listeners and lower blood pressure, Journey became sought after by professional therapists and natural healthcare specialists.

As demand for O'Connor's album grew, he and O'Rourke, established a recording studio and record label, Studio Horizons in 1988. This enabled his recordings to be sold to a wider audience, which resulted a jump in sales. In 1989 O'Connor released, Mariner, which reached No. 40 on the ARIA Albums Chart in March 1993.

From 1992 to 1997, O'Connor collaborated with Australian wildlife photographer and publisher, Steve Parish. They combined to create a range of CDs set to particular nature themes, resulting in albums, Uluru, Kakadu, Rainforest Magic, Wilderness and Windjana – Spirit of the Kimberly.

Tony O'Connor was diagnosed with glioblastoma multiforme late in 2008, he underwent surgeries but died on 23 May 2010 of the brain tumour. He is survived by his life partner, Jacqui O'Rourke (a.k.a. Jacqui O'Connor), and their child.

In July 2021, Brisbane-based independent music enterprise SGC Group, signed a partnership to release O'Connor's music digitally.

In April 2022 O'Connor's final album, Looking Through My Window was released. It was recorded in the year leading up to his passing.

== Composing and recording ==
An independent artist, O'Connor recorded all of his music in his own recording studio. Situated on a 42-acre rainforest property, "Hidden Forest" (also the name of an album and a song) on the Blackall Range in Queensland, he described it, "a most inspiring place to live and work", as the studio itself was positioned above the trees, where "...birdsongs fill the daytime... in winter a magical mist floods through the forest and surrounds the house. At night, the sounds are amazing... owls echo across the gorge, crickets and frogs lull us to sleep every evening." O'Connor also recorded as he wrote, with most of his pieces beginning on the guitar or the piano and advancing from there. O'Connor wrote, or began writing, most of his pieces in the early morning, saying "...in the wee hours of the morning... I begin to hear/feel a melody and I simply cannot stop myself from sitting at the piano or picking up a guitar and trying to capture it... before it leaves."

O'Connor considered himself a guitarist more than anything else, claiming that many of his songs would begin on a guitar, even if there was no guitar in the final recording. He played a range of different guitars including 6-string steel string guitars, classical guitars and 12-string guitars. O'Connor mainly played Taylor Guitars, although he claimed that his favourite guitar was a hand-made Mirabook, built for him by Gary Albrecht, admitting, however, that he favoured a 'very special' Takamine Guitars Santa Fe classical. O'Connor's secondary instrument was the piano, in particular, a Yamaha C4 baby grand piano. O'Connor claims that this is where most of his composing came from.

As well as the guitar and the piano, O'Connor also played the flute, both metal and wood based flutes, as well as an Electric Wind Instrument (EWI) which allowed for a wide variety of instrument sounds to be produced on one instrument. He also played percussion, the bass guitar and keyboards. O'Connor usually worked as a solo artist, playing all instruments in his recordings. He did, however, collaborate with guitarist Paul Clement on the album Summer Rain, with songs co-written by both artists featured on the CD. Clement also played the guitar on Mariner, Tales of the Wind, Bushland Dreaming, Lovesong, Live in Concert, Dreams and Discoveries and Whispering Sea.

Tony and Paul met in Brisbane 1981 and performed as a duo prior to Tonys' move to keyboards etc.

To record his music, O'Connor used AKG Acoustics and RODE Microphones mics on a Sony digital console. The microphones were first fed through two Amek Channel-In-A-Box units for equalizing and compression. All Taylor guitars were recorded directly using Fishman pickups. As O'Connor was passionate about achieving the best quality recording possible, the equipment he used changed as technology improved and, as a result, the exact equipment used to record each album is not known. Wind Seeker, however, was tracked, mixed and mastered within Emagic's Logic Audio software, using Digidesign digital interfaces on a Macintosh G4 466Mhz computer. The album was recorded in 24bit 44.1 kHz digital audio, however the final master was dithered to 16bit using Waves software plug ins.

== Discography ==
=== Studio albums ===
Title	Details	Peak chart positions
Title	Details	AUS
Journey	Released: 1987; Label: Studio Horizon; Format: Cassette	—
Because We Fly	Released: 1988; Label: Studio Horizon; Format: Cassette	—
Childlight	Released: 1988; Label: Studio Horizon; Format: Cassette	—
Mariner	Released: 1989; Label: Studio Horizon (HOR CD 01); Format: CD, cassette	40
In Touch	Released: 1990; Label: Studio Horizon (HOR CD 02); Format: CD, cassette	—
Mirror Moon	Released: 1990; Label: Studio Horizon (HOR CD 03); Format: CD, cassette	—
Bushland Dreaming	Released: 1990; Label: Steve Parish (307202); Format: CD, cassette	—
Hidden Forest: Australian Nature Series 4	Released: 1990; Label: Steve Parish (307209); Format: CD, cassette	—
Tales of the Wind	Released: 1991; Label: Studio Horizon (HOR CD 04); Format: CD, cassette	—
Uluru	Released: 1991; Label: Studio Horizon (307205); Format: CD, cassette	—
Seashore Sunrise	Released: 1991; Label: Studio Horizon (SPP1); Format: CD, cassette	—
Rainforest Magic	Released: 1991; Label: Studio Horizon (SPP2); Format: CD, cassette	—
Kakadu	Released: 1992; Label: Studio Horizon (307206); Format: CD, cassette	—
Australian Lullaby	Released: 1992; Label: Studio Horizon (307207); Format: CD, cassette	—
Australian Bush Garden	Released: 1992; Label: Studio Horizon (307208); Format: CD, cassette	—
Nature's Playtime	Released: 1992; Label: Studio Horizon (CAS 08); Format: Cassette	—
Australian Bush Christmas	Released: 1992; Label: Studio Horizon (CAS 04/COM 04); Format: CD, cassette	—
Wilderness	Released: 1993; Label: Steve Parish (307210) / Studio Horizon (HOR CD 13); Format: CD, cassette	—
Of Dreams and Discoveries	Released: 1994; Label: Steve Parish (307211) / Studio Horizon (HOR CD 16); Format: CD, cassette	—
Daytime Playtime	Released: 1994; Label: Steve Parish; Format: Cassette	—
Nightime Lullaby	Released: 1994; Label: Steve Parish; Format: Cassette	—
Lovesong	Released: 1995; Label: Studio Horizon (307216) / Studio Horizon (HOR CD 17); Format: CD, cassette	—
Enchanted Christmas	Released: 1995; Label: Studio Horizon; Format: CD, cassette; Recorded in 1989	—
Windjana: Spirit of the Kimberley	Released: 1996; Label: Studio Horizon (307217) / Studio Horizon (HOR CD 18); Format: CD, cassette	—
Summer Rain (with Paul Clément)	Released: 1997; Label: Studios Studio Horizon (HOR CD 21); Format: CD, cassette	—
Music for Mother and Child	Released: 1998; Label: Studio Horizon; Format: CD	—
Whispering Sea	Released: 1999; Label: Studio Horizon (HOR CD24); Format: CD	—
Awakenings	Released: June 1999; Label: Studio Horizon (HOR CD25); Format: CD	—
Dreamtime	Released: 1999; Label: Studio Horizon (HOR CD32); Format: CD	—
Under Southern Skies	Released: 2000; Label: Studio Horizon (HOR CD36); Format: CD	—
Hall of Beginnings	Released: 2001; Label: Studio Horizon (HOR CD37); Format: CD	—
Wind Seeker	Released: 2002; Label: Studio Horizon (HOR CD40); Format: CD	—
Aqua Zone	Released: 2003; Label: Studio Horizon (HOR CD41/HORDVD02); Format: CD, DVD	—
Memento	Released: 2005; Label: Studio Horizon (HOR CD43); Format: CD	—
Complete Calm: Music for Relaxation	Released: 2007; Label: Studio Horizon (HOR CD47); Format: CD	—
Looking Through My Window	Released: April 2022; Label: Studio Horizon (HO RCD49); Format: CD, streaming	—

=== Live albums ===
Title	Details
Live in Concert at the Sydney Opera House	Released: 1998; Label: Steve Parish (HORCD22); Format: CD

=== Compilation albums ===
Title	Details
Sea Australia	Released: 1996; Label: Steve Parish; Format:
The Zodiac Collection	Released: 2000; Label: Studio Horizon; Format:
Private Collection	Released: 2004; Label: Studio Horizon; Format:
