= David Barniville =

Irish barrister, Court of Appeal judge since 2021

The Hon. Mr. Justice David Barniville
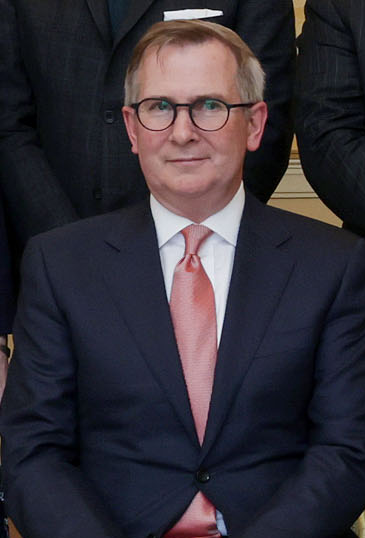
- Barniville in 2024

President of the High Court
- Incumbent
- Assumed office 13 July 2022
- Nominated by: Government of Ireland
- Appointed by: Michael D. Higgins
- Preceded by: Mary Irvine

Judge of the High Court
- Incumbent
- Assumed office 13 July 2022
- Nominated by: Government of Ireland
- Appointed by: Michael D. Higgins
- In office 1 December 2017 – 30 August 2021
- Nominated by: Government of Ireland
- Appointed by: Michael D. Higgins

Judge of the Court of Appeal
- In office 30 August 2021 – 13 July 2022 (Note: ex officio member from 13 July 2022)
- Nominated by: Government of Ireland
- Appointed by: Michael D. Higgins

Personal details
- Born: Dublin, Ireland
- Spouse: Susan O'Connell (m. 1998)
- Children: 3
- Relatives: Henry Barniville (grandfather)
- Education: University College Dublin; King's Inns

David Barniville is an Irish judge who has served as President of the High Court since July 2022 and a Judge of the High Court since July 2022, and previously from 2017 to 2021. He previously served as a Judge of the Court of Appeal from 2021 to 2022. He is also a former Chair of the Bar Council of Ireland. He is an ex officio member of the Supreme Court and the Court of Appeal.

== Early life and education ==
Barniville is from Dublin. He was born to Geraldine and Harry (both international tennis players), while his grandfather Henry Barniville was a member of Seanad Éireann and surgeon. He attended secondary school at Blackrock College. He studied for a BCL degree at University College Dublin, graduating in 1988. He completed his studies at the King's Inns.

== Legal career ==
Barniville was called to the Bar in July 1990 and became a Senior Counsel in October 2006. He was called to the Bar of England and Wales in 2016. He is a Bencher of the King's Inns and of Middle Temple.

His practice as a barrister consisted of commercial law and constitutional and administrative law. He was also an Accredited Mediator with a special interest in arbitration. He was counsel for the Beef Tribunal and appeared with Donal O'Donnell for Michael Lowry at the Moriarty Tribunal. He represented the Minister for Finance in the High Court on the nationalisation of Allied Irish Banks in December 2010, and again on the recapitalisation of Irish Life & Permanent.

He appeared regularly in the European Court of Justice representing Ireland.

He was the chairman of the Bar Council of Ireland between 2014 and 2016. He has also been a member of the Legal Services Regulatory Authority, the Board of the Courts Service of the Judicial Appointments Advisory Board and the Legal Aid Board. In 2016, the Minister for Justice and Equality Frances Fitzgerald sought clarifications from the Bar Council on the procedure of Barniville's appointment to the Legal Services Regulatory Authority. The Department of Justice and Equality was ultimately satisfied with the selection process.

He is an adjunct professor of law at the University of Limerick. He has acted as a governor of the National Maternity Hospital, Dublin and was the chair of Irish Rule of Law International.

== Judicial career ==
=== High Court ===
He was appointed a Judge of the High Court in December 2017. He was the court's designated arbitration judge from June 2018. As of 2020, he was the Judge in Charge of the Commercial List.

In the High Court, he has presided over cases on matters including insolvency law, injunctions, defamation law, and judicial review. He was previously the Judge in Charge of the Strategic Infrastructure List, hearing appeals of An Bord Pleanála decisions, including for developments at Saint Anne's Park and Cherrywood, Dublin.

He was appointed the chairperson of the Referendum Commission in September 2019 for a referendum on Nonresident voting at Irish presidential elections.

=== Court of Appeal ===
The appointment of Maurice Collins as a part-time commissioner of the Law Reform Commission permitted a vacancy on the Court of Appeal. Barniville was nominated to fill the role in June 2021 and was appointed in August 2021.

=== President of the High Court ===
Barniville was nominated to become President of the High Court in June 2022, to succeed Mary Irvine on her retirement in July 2022. He was appointed on 13 July 2022.

== Personal life ==
Barnville is married to Susan O'Connell and has three children.

Legal offices
Preceded by Mary Irvine	President of the High Court; July 2022–present	Incumbent
