= Mary Irvine =

Irish judge (born 1956)

President of the High Court
- In office 18 June 2020 – 13 July 2022
- Nominated by: Government of Ireland
- Appointed by: Michael D. Higgins
- Preceded by: Peter Kelly
- Succeeded by: David Barniville

Judge of the High Court
- In office 18 June 2020 – 13 July 2022
- Nominated by: Government of Ireland
- Appointed by: Michael D. Higgins
- In office 5 June 2007 – 24 October 2014
- Nominated by: Government of Ireland
- Appointed by: Mary McAleese

Judge of the Supreme Court
- In office 13 May 2019 – 18 June 2020 (Note: ex officio member while President of the High Court)
- Nominated by: Government of Ireland
- Appointed by: Michael D. Higgins

Judge of the Court of Appeal
- In office 24 October 2014 – 12 May 2019 (Note: ex officio member while President of the High Court)
- Nominated by: Government of Ireland
- Appointed by: Michael D. Higgins

Personal details
- Born: 10 December 1956 (age 69) Clontarf, Dublin, Ireland
- Spouse: Michael Moriarty (div.)
- Children: 3
- Education: University College Dublin; King's Inns

Mary Irvine (born 10 December 1956) is a retired Irish judge who served as President of the High Court between 2020 and 2022, a Judge of the High Court from 2007 to 2014, and 2020 to 2022, a Judge of the Supreme Court from 2019 to 2020, and a Judge of the Court of Appeal from 2014 to 2019.

She was nominated to become the President of the High Court in June 2020. In addition to being the first woman to hold that position she is the first judge to have held four judicial offices.

== Early life ==
Irvine was born to John and Cecily Irvine in 1956 in Clontarf, Dublin. Her father was once deputy director of RTÉ. She was educated at Mount Anville Secondary School, University College Dublin and the King's Inns. She was an international golf player, winning the Irish Girls Close Championship in 1975.

== Legal career ==
She was called to the Bar in 1978, and became a Senior Counsel in 1996. She was the secretary of the Bar Council of Ireland in 1992. She was elected a Bencher of the King's Inns in 2004.

Irvine specialised in medical law, appearing in medical negligence cases on behalf of and against health boards in actions. She was a legal advisor to an inquiry into Deposit interest retention tax conducted by the Public Accounts Committee, along with future judicial colleagues Frank Clarke and Paul Gilligan. She represented the Congregation of Christian Brothers at the Commission to Inquire into Child Abuse.

Her practice also extended to constitutional law. As a junior counsel, she represented the plaintiff in Cahill v. Sutton in 1980 in the Supreme Court with seniors Niall McCarthy and James O'Driscoll. The case established the modern Irish law of standing for applicants to challenge the constitutional validity of statutes. She appeared with Peter Kelly to argue on behalf the right of the unborn in a reference made by President Mary Robinson under Article 26 of the Constitution to the Supreme Court in 1995 regarding the Information (Termination of Pregnancies) Bill 1995.

== Judicial career ==
=== High Court ===
Irvine was appointed as a Judge of the High Court in June 2007. She was in charge of the High Court Personal Injuries list from 2009 to 2014 and subsequently became the second Chair of the Working Group on Medical Negligence and Periodic Payments, established by the President of the High Court.

=== Court of Appeal ===
She was appointed to Court of Appeal on its establishment in October 2014. Some of her judgments on the Court of Appeal reduced awards given by lower courts for personal injury compensation. She wrote "most of the key" Court of Appeal judgments between 2015 and 2017 which had the effect of reducing awards arising from subsequent actions in the High Court.

She was appointed to chair a statutory tribunal to conduct hearings and deal with cases related to the CervicalCheck cancer scandal in 2019. However following her appointment as President of the High Court in 2020, she was unable to continue with the position.

=== Supreme Court of Ireland ===
On 4 April 2019, she was nominated by the Government of Ireland as a Judge of the Supreme Court. She was appointed by the President of Ireland on 13 May 2019. She wrote decisions for the court in appeals involving planning law, the law of tort, intellectual property law, judicial review, and chancery law.

Irvine was appointed by Chief Justice Frank Clarke in 2019 to chair the Personal Injuries Guidelines Committee of the Judicial Council. The purpose of the committee is to review the levels of compensation issues in court cases arising out of personal injuries. Minister of State at the Department of Finance Michael W. D'Arcy wrote a letter to congratulate Irvine on her appointment and outlined his views that personal injuries awards in Ireland should be "recalibrated". She responded to the letter by saying it was the not the committee's duty to tailor its findings "in a manner favourable to any particular interest group".

=== President of the High Court ===
Following a cabinet meeting on 12 June 2020, it was announced that she would be nominated to succeed Peter Kelly as President of the High Court. A three-person panel consisting of the Chief Justice Frank Clarke (later substituted by George Birmingham), the Attorney General Séamus Woulfe and a management consultant Jane Williams reviewed applications for the position, before making recommendations to cabinet. The President of the Law Society of Ireland welcomed her appointment, describing her as a "outstandingly able judge". She is the first woman to hold the role. As she was previously an ordinary judge of three courts, her appointment as President of the High Court made her the first person to have held four judicial offices. She was appointed on 18 June 2020 and made her judicial declaration on 19 June.

She took over as president amid the COVID-19 pandemic in the Republic of Ireland. She issued guidelines for lawyers to negotiate personal injury cases outside of court due to the backlog formed by delays in hearings. She issued a practice direction in July 2020 that face coverings were to be worn at High Court hearings. She criticised barristers and solicitors in October 2020 for not wearing masks in the Four Courts.

In her first week as president, she presided over a three-judge division of the High Court in a case taken by several members of Seanad Éireann. The plaintiffs sought a declaration that the Seanad should sit even though the nominated members of Seanad Éireann had not been appointed. The court refused the relief and found for the State. In 2021, she also presided over a three-judge division on a Seanad Éireann voting rights case, where the plaintiff argued for the extension of voting rights to graduates of all third-level educational institutions and the wider population. The court found against the plaintiff.

She continued to sit in the Supreme Court following her appointment.

In April 2022, Irvine announced her intention to retire in July 2022. She retired on 13 July 2022 and was succeeded by David Barniville.

== Personal life ==
Irvine was formerly married to retired judge Michael Moriarty, with whom she has three children. Her only known son, Mark Moriarty, died suddenly on 19 August 2022

Legal offices
Preceded by Peter Kelly	President of the High Court; June 2020–July 2022	Succeeded by David Barniville
