= Joseph Finnegan (judge) =

Irish judge (1942–2023)

Judge of the Supreme Court
- In office 11 December 2006 – 22 March 2012
- Nominated by: Government of Ireland
- Appointed by: Mary McAleese

President of the High Court
- In office 1 December 2001 – 11 December 2006
- Nominated by: Government of Ireland
- Appointed by: Mary McAleese
- Preceded by: Frederick Morris
- Succeeded by: Richard Johnson

Judge of the High Court
- In office 15 November 1999 – 11 December 2006
- Nominated by: Government of Ireland
- Appointed by: Mary Aleese

Personal details
- Born: 1 October 1942 Swords, County Dublin, Ireland
- Died: 16 December 2023 (aged 81) Dublin, Ireland
- Education: University College Dublin; King's Inns

Joseph Gerald Finnegan (1 October 1942 – 16 December 2023) was an Irish judge who served as a Judge of the Supreme Court from 2006 to 2012, President of the High Court from 2001 to 2006 and a Judge of the High Court from 1999 to 2006.

Finnegan was technically the second highest ranking judge in Ireland while he was President of the High Court and was an ex officio member of the Supreme Court that he was subsequently appointed to as a full member.

== Biography ==
Joseph Gerald Finnegan was born on 1 October 1942. He was educated at Synge Street CBS and St. Mary's College Dundalk. He attended University College Dublin and was awarded degrees of Bachelor of Civil Law and Bachelor of Laws. He qualified as a solicitor in 1966. He was Assistant Secretary of the Incorporated Law Society of Ireland from 1968 to 1973. He was called to the Bar in 1978 and became Senior Counsel in 1990. He practised mainly in general common law and chancery matters. He had a particular interest in conveyancing and title-related litigation. He was appointed to the bench of the High Court in 1999 and was appointed President of the High Court in 2001, a position which he held until his appointment to the Supreme Court of Ireland in December 2006. He retired from the Supreme Court in 2012.

Finnegan was a member of the Board of the Courts Service from 2001 to 2006 sat on the finance committee and remuneration committee and was chairman of its audit committee. He had a keen interest in legal education and was a member of the education committee of the Honorable Society of the King's Inns from 2000 until his death. He was also a Bencher of the Honorable Society of King's Inns and a Bencher of the Honorable Society of Middle Temple.

Finnegan died in Dublin on 16 December 2023, at the age of 81.

Legal offices
Preceded by Frederick Morris	President of the High Court; 2001–2006	Succeeded by Richard Johnson
