= Henry Barniville =

Irish politician and surgeon (1887–1960)

Senator
- In office 27 April 1938 – 23 September 1960
- Constituency: National University

Senator
- In office 11 December 1922 – 29 May 1936

Personal details
- Born: 10 April 1887 Belfast, Ireland
- Died: 23 September 1960 (aged 73) Dublin, Ireland
- Party: Fine Gael
- Spouse: Brigid Wymes (m. 1919)
- Children: 3
- Relatives: David Barniville (grandson)
- Education: National University of Ireland

Henry Leo Barniville (10 April 1887 – 23 September 1960) was an Irish politician and surgeon who served as a Senator for the National University from 1922 to 1936 and 1938 to 1960.

== Life and career ==
Barniville was born in Belfast in 1887, to John Banniville and Mary Burke. He was educated at Rockwell College, County Tipperary and studied medicine at the National University of Ireland. After graduation in 1916, he worked as house surgeon at the Mater Misericordiae University Hospital in Dublin, eventually becoming senior surgeon at the hospital. He was professor of surgery at University College Dublin from 1928 to 1958.

He was elected to the new Free State Seanad in 1922 for 3 years. He was re-elected in 1925 for a 12-year term and served until the Free State Seanad was abolished in 1936. When the new Seanad Éireann was established in 1937, he was elected by the National University constituency. He was re-elected at each subsequent election and served until his death in office in 1960.

He holds the record as the second-longest serving member of the Seanad, as he was a member for a total of 35 years, 11 months.

He died in Dublin on 23 September 1960.
