= Nicholas Kearns =

Irish judge (born 1946)

President of the High Court
- In office 28 October 2009 – 19 December 2015
- Nominated by: Government of Ireland
- Appointed by: Mary McAleese
- Preceded by: Richard Johnson
- Succeeded by: Peter Kelly

Judge of the High Court
- In office 28 October 2009 – 19 December 2015
- Nominated by: Government of Ireland
- Appointed by: Mary McAleese
- In office 9 January 1998 – 15 November 2004
- Nominated by: Government of Ireland
- Appointed by: Mary McAleese

Judge of the Supreme Court
- In office 15 November 2004 – 28 October 2009 (Note: ex officio member while President of the High Court)
- Nominated by: Government of Ireland
- Appointed by: Mary McAleese

Personal details
- Born: 4 December 1946 (age 79) Dublin, Ireland
- Spouse: Eleanor Kearns (m. 1978)
- Children: 4
- Education: University College Dublin; King's Inns

Nicholas Kearns (born 12 December 1946) is a retired Irish judge who served as President of the High Court from 2009 to 2015 and a Judge of the High Court from 1998 to 2015, and previously from 1998 to 2004, and a Judge of the Supreme Court from 2004 to 2009.

== Early life ==
Kearns was born in 1946 and educated at St Mary's College, Dublin. He attended University College Dublin and subsequently attended the King's Inns. He also achieved a diploma in European law from UCD.

== Legal career ==
He was called to the bar in 1968, the Bar of England and Wales in 1981 and became a senior counsel in March 1982. His practice was primarily focused on personal injuries law.

== Judicial career ==
=== High Court ===
He was appointed a High Court judge in 1998. At one stage, he was in charge of the competition law list. He co-founded the Association of European Competition Law Judges.

He was an ad hoc judge of the European Court of Human Rights, serving from 2000 until 2009.

He was the chairperson of the Referendum Commission convened for the 27th Amendment to the Constitution of Ireland in 2004.

He has presided over the Special Criminal Court, and the former Court of Criminal Appeal.

=== Supreme Court ===
He was elevated to the Supreme Court of Ireland in 2004.

=== President of the High Court ===
He became the President of the High Court in October 2009. He retired in 2015 ahead of the mandatory retirement date to spend more time with family.

==== Doherty v. Ireland ====
On 12 July 2010, the High Court granted leave to Sinn Féin Senator Pearse Doherty for a judicial review into why a by-election was not being held in Donegal South-West. The seat was vacant since June 2009, following the resignation of Fianna Fáil TD Pat "the Cope" Gallagher on his election to the European Parliament. On 2 November 2010, the High Court ruled that there was an unreasonable delay in holding the by-election. In his ruling, Kearns described the delay as unprecedented and that the delay amounted to a breach of Doherty's constitutional rights. He declared that Section 30 (2) of the Electoral Act 1992 should be construed as requiring that a writ for a by-election be moved within a reasonable time of the vacancy arising. He further stated,

...it is the ongoing failure to move the writ for this by-election since June 2009 which offends the terms and spirit of the Constitution and its framework for democratic representation.

However, Justice Kearns did not order the Government of Ireland to set a date for the by-election. The Government announced on 4 November 2010, that the by-election would be held on 25 November. They also stated that they would appeal to the Supreme Court. On 26 November 2010, Doherty won the by-election.

== Post-judicial career ==
Kearns was appointed by Mary Mitchell O'Connor in 2017 to become the chairperson of the Personal Injuries Commission. The purpose of the commission was to review the claims process in Ireland.

He became the deputy chairperson of the National Maternity Hospital, Dublin in 2015 and is a trustee of the Gate Theatre.

== Personal life ==
He is married to Eleanor, with whom he has four sons.

Legal offices
| Preceded by Richard Johnson | President of the High Court; October 2009–December 2015 | Succeeded by Peter Kelly |
