= Peter Kelly (judge) =

Irish judge (born 1950)

President of the High Court
- In office 21 December 2015 – 17 June 2020
- Nominated by: Government of Ireland
- Appointed by: Michael D. Higgins
- Preceded by: Nicholas Kearns
- Succeeded by: Mary Irvine

Judge of the High Court
- In office 15 April 1996 – 2 February 2014
- Nominated by: Government of Ireland
- Appointed by: Mary Robinson

Judge of the Court of Appeal
- In office 2 February 2014 – 21 December 2015
- Nominated by: Government of Ireland
- Appointed by: Michael D. Higgins

Personal details
- Born: 17 June 1950 (age 76) Artane, Dublin, Ireland
- Education: University College Dublin; King's Inns

Peter Thomas Kelly (born 17 June 1950) is a retired Irish judge. He served as President of the High Court from 2015 to 2020, a Judge of the High Court from 2015 to 2020 (and previously from 1996 to 2014) and a Judge of Court of Appeal from 2014 to 2015. He was an ex officio member of the Supreme Court of Ireland while President of the High Court.

== Early life and education ==
Kelly was born in Dublin in 1950 and attended O'Connell School. He was educated at University College Dublin and the King's Inns.

== Legal career ==
Upon leaving school, he worked as a civil servant at the High Court Central Office. He was called to the Irish Bar in 1973. Kelly then worked in the European Division of the Department of Justice in Brussels and Luxembourg until he commenced practice in 1975. He was also called to the Bar of England and Wales and the Bar of Northern Ireland in 1981 and 1983 respectively.

He became a Senior Counsel in 1986. He primarily practised in commercial and chancery law, though he also acted in constitutional law cases. He represented Fianna Fáil politician Des Hanafin in a case seeking to have Fifteenth Amendment of the Constitution of Ireland, permitting divorce, declared to be unconstitutional. The Supreme Court appointed him to argue for the right of the unborn in a reference made by President Mary Robinson under Article 26 of the Constitution of Ireland to the Supreme Court regarding the Information (Termination of Pregnancies) Bill 1995.

Kelly acted for families of the victims Stardust fire seeking compensation from the Stardust Victims Compensation Tribunal in 1986. Other clients over the course of his career included the Aga Khan and Ben Dunne.

He is a bencher at the King's Inns since 1996 and Middle Temple since 2014.

== Judicial career ==
=== High Court ===
Kelly was appointed a High Court judge in 1996 at the age of 46. He was the judge-in-charge of the Chancery List between 1997 and 1999 and the Judicial Review List between 1999 and 2003.

Early in his career on the bench in High Court, he clashed with the government over the treatment of vulnerable young people. In 2000 he put in place a mandatory injunction requiring government ministers to provide specialist support care for underage patient. This provoked controversy with the government as if not followed, it would have held the relevant minister in contempt of court. An appeal to the Supreme Court of his decision was subsequently upheld.

He became the first President of the Association of Judges of Ireland in 2011. In 2013, he accused the then government of taking apart the legal system "brick by brick".

=== Commercial Court ===
He was appointed as the presiding judge over a newly established Commercial Court within the High Court in 2004, which was tasked to hear cases which were complex or with a claim in excess of €1 million. The structure of the court came about following rules which he proposed to the Superior Court Rules Committee and were accepted by the Minister for Justice. It was launched in October 2004.

Kelly continued to preside over the court throughout the post-2008 Irish economic downturn. He heard high-profile cases arising out of the economic crash including cases involving Anglo Irish Bank, Seán Quinn, Mick Wallace and ACC Bank. He awarded a €2.2 billion judgment against Quinn. Kelly said that while presiding over the Commercial Court he witnessed "national and international fraud, sharp practice, chicanery and dishonesty".

=== Court of Appeal ===
In 2014, following the establishment of the Court of Appeal, he was elevated as a judge of the court. He was one of the first six ordinary judges of the court.

=== President of the High Court ===
He was appointed as President of the High Court on 21 December 2015. By virtue of his position, he is also a member of the Supreme Court of Ireland. Upon his appointment, the Director General of the Law Society of Ireland described him as a "fearlessly independent judge with a ferocious work ethic" and said he had a "first-class legal mind".

Kelly was the Acting President of the Court of Appeal for a period in 2016 while Sean Ryan was on medical leave. The Irish Times reported that he was one of three judges considered for the role of Chief Justice of Ireland upon the retirement of Susan Denham in 2017, though only Frank Clarke's name was put forward for selection by the cabinet.

As President, he introduced greater safeguards for the ward of court process, re-introducing independent medical visitors.

He retired on 17 June 2020 upon reaching the mandatory statutory retirement age of 70. He received a guard of honour from judicial colleagues in lieu of a traditional ceremony, due to COVID-19 concerns. At the time of his retirement, he was the second-longest serving Irish judge. Mícheál O’Higgins, then President of the Bar Council, praised what he considered Kelly's "competence, rigour, propriety and independence".

== Further appointments ==
Kelly is an adjunct professor of law at Maynooth University, serving on the Council of the Royal College of Surgeons in Ireland. He is also chairman of the Edmund Rice Schools Trust and St. Francis Hospice, Raheny. In June 2022, he was sworn in as judge of the court of appeal of the Dubai International Financial Centre (DIFC) courts but resigned a few days later following criticism from barrister and Labour Party leader, Ivana Bacik.

== Personal life ==
Kelly lives in south Dublin.

Legal offices
Preceded by Nicholas Kearns	President of the High Court; December 2015–June 2020	Succeeded by Mary Irvine
