= Judicial review in the Republic of Ireland =

Judicial review in the Republic of Ireland is a way for the Superior Courts to supervise the Oireachtas to make sure that legislation does not conflict with the Constitution. "Superior Courts" refers to either the High Court of Ireland, the Court of Appeal of Ireland or the Supreme Court of Ireland and is a specific reference to the greater width of their jurisdiction in comparison to Ireland's lower courts (that is, the District Court and the Circuit Court). An applicant for judicial review in Ireland must start by applying for leave to seek judicial review. This acts as a filter of entirely spurious or unfounded matters. Having been granted leave, the applicant must then remake the entire application for judicial review whereupon the Court will set a date for hearing.

All judicial review in Ireland is conducted by the High Court unless the applicant wants a review of any decision, activity, ruling or rule of the High Court whereby the review is conducted by the Supreme Court (including appeals of decisions previously made in High Court judicial reviews)
