= Circuit Court (Ireland) =

Irish intermediate level court

- General: 2016; 2020; 2024
- Presidential: 2011; 2018; 2025
- Local: 2014; 2019; 2024
- European: 2014; 2019; 2024

The Circuit Court (Irish: An Chúirt Chuarda) of Ireland is an intermediate level court of local and limited jurisdiction which hears both civil and criminal matters. On the criminal side the Circuit Court hears criminal matters tried on indictment with a judge and jury, except for certain serious crimes which are tried in either the Central Criminal Court or the Special Criminal Court. On the civil side the Circuit Court has a considerable parallel jurisdiction — including equitable remedies — with the High Court but normally cannot award damages of more than €75,000. The Circuit Court also hears de novo appeals from the District Court in both civil and criminal matters.

The Circuit Court consists of a President and thirty-seven ordinary judges and six specialist judges. It is composed of eight circuits, each of which cover an ad hoc region of the state. One judge is assigned to each circuit except in Dublin where ten judges may be assigned, and Cork, where there is provision for three judges. The President of the District Court is an ex officio member of the Circuit Court.

== History ==
The Circuit Court was first established as the Circuit Court of Justice under the Courts of Justice Act 1924 and replaced the County Court on the civil side, and quarter sessions and recorder's courts on the criminal side, as well as some of the jurisdiction of the assizes.

== Jurisdiction ==
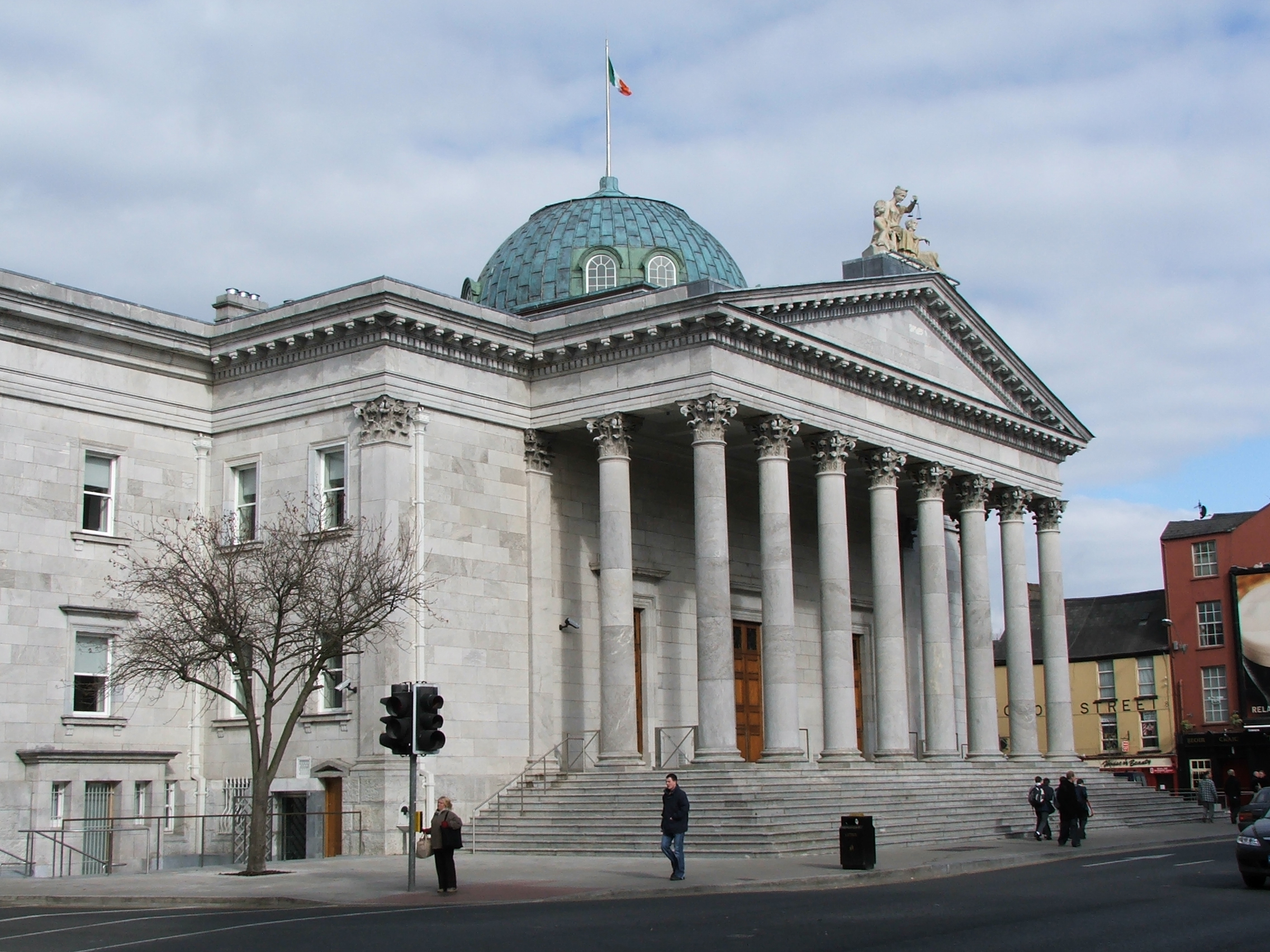
The courthouse on Washington Street in Cork, home of the Cork Circuit Court

The Irish constitution permits the creation of courts of "local and limited jurisdiction". The local nature of the Circuit Court exists in the manner in which each circuit of the court only has jurisdiction to consider matters arising within its assigned county or counties. And the limited nature occurs in the manner in which it can only adjudicate over matters which are expressly indicated to be within its jurisdiction by statute.

This having been said a considerable number of powers are conferred on the Circuit Court by statute, which as a result frequently has parallel jurisdiction with the High Court. Probably the most significant difference between the Circuit Court and the High Court is that the Circuit Court has no jurisdiction to question the constitutionality of any statute or even to hear arguments to that effect, a matter which the Irish Constitution reserves solely to the High Court, the Court of Appeal and the Supreme Court.

=== Civil ===
The civil jurisdiction of the Circuit Court is limited to a compensation claim not exceeding €75,000 (€60,000 if a claim for damages for personal injuries) and for actions involving real property with a market value of less than €3 million, although the parties in a legal action can agree to lifting these limits by agreeing to unlimited jurisdiction. Divorce and judicial separation, and contentious probate cases can also be heard provided that the value of any real property in a settlement is within the jurisdiction of the court. Unlike the District Court and in common with the High Court, the Circuit Court has equitable jurisdiction in relation to claims involving land, but matters in which injunctions and declarations are sought not involving land must be brought in the High Court.

Civil matters heard in the Circuit Court can be appealed to the High Court.

=== Criminal ===
The court tries all indictable offences (i.e. those triable by a judge and jury) with the exception of certain offences (murder, aggravated murder, treason, rape, piracy and genocide) that are reserved for the Central Criminal Court.

Terrorist offences and offences with an organised crime element can be heard by the non-jury Special Criminal Court.

Decisions of the Circuit Court in criminal matters can be appealed to the Court of Appeal.

=== Family law ===
Under the Family Law Act 1995, the Circuit Court, under the name Circuit Family Court, shares with the High Court original jurisdiction for family law cases. The rules of court for such cases are different, and reporting of them is more restricted.

=== Appellate ===
The court hears de novo appeals from the District Court. When hearing appeals Circuit Court judges have the same powers as a District Court judge and so cannot give higher sentences or award more damages than a District Court judge could do.

The Circuit Court further can hear appeals from various statutory bodies including the Employment Appeals Tribunal, the Appeal Commissioners of Income Tax and the Mental Health Tribunal. The Circuit Court when hearing such an appeal can make any order the statutory tribunal could have made at first instance.

== President of Circuit Court ==
The office of the President of the Circuit Court was established under the Courts of Justice Act 1947. The current president is Patricia Ryan.

Name	Term of office
George William Shannon	1947–1959
Barra Ó Briain	1959–1973
John Charles Conroy	1973–1975
John James Durcan	1975–1977
Thomas Joseph Neylon	1977–1986
Thomas Francis Roe	1986–1990
Peter O'Malley	1990–1991
Francis Robert Spain	1991–1997
Diarmuid Sheridan	1998
Esmond Smyth	1998–2005
Matthew Deery	2005–2012
Raymond Groarke	2012–2019
Patricia Ryan	2019–present

== Circuits ==
Circuit	County
Dublin Circuit	Dublin
Cork Circuit	Cork
Northern Circuit	Leitrim
Northern Circuit	Donegal
Northern Circuit	Cavan
Northern Circuit	Monaghan
Midland Circuit	Laois
Midland Circuit	Roscommon
Midland Circuit	Longford
Midland Circuit	Sligo
Midland Circuit	Offaly
Midland Circuit	Westmeath
Eastern Circuit	Louth
Eastern Circuit	Meath
Eastern Circuit	Wicklow
Eastern Circuit	Kildare
South Western Circuit	Limerick
South Western Circuit	Kerry
South Western Circuit	Clare
South Eastern Circuit	Carlow
South Eastern Circuit	Tipperary
South Eastern Circuit	Kilkenny
South Eastern Circuit	Waterford
South Eastern Circuit	Wexford
Western Circuit	Galway
Western Circuit	Mayo
