= High Court (Ireland) =

Irish superior trial court

The High Court (Irish: An Ard-Chúirt) of Ireland is a court which deals at first instance with the most serious and important civil and criminal cases. When sitting as a criminal court it is called the Central Criminal Court and sits with judge and jury. It also acts as a court of appeal for civil cases in the Circuit Court. It also has the power to determine whether or not a law is constitutional, and of judicial review over acts of the government and other public bodies.

== Structure ==
The High Court is established by Article 34 of the Constitution of Ireland, which grants the court "full original jurisdiction in and power to determine all matters and questions whether of law or fact, civil or criminal", as well as the ability to determine "the validity of any law having regard to the provisions of this Constitution". Judges are appointed by the President, as Article 35 dictates. However, as with almost all the President's constitutional powers, these appointments are made on "the advice of the Government". In practice, this means that the judges are nominated by the government and automatically approved by the President.

The High Court is composed of its president, 42 ordinary judges, and additional judges being ex officio the Chief Justice, the President of the Court of Appeal, the President of the Circuit Court, and former chief justices and courts presidents who remain judges.

Cases are normally heard by one judge, but the President of the High Court may order that a particular case be heard by three judges sitting together — a so-called 'divisional court'.

The court normally hears cases in the Four Courts building in Dublin, although it also has regular sittings outside the capital.

Mella Carroll was the first woman to serve on the court and did so between 1980 and 2005.

== Central Criminal Court ==
The High Court is known as the 'Central Criminal Court' when it is hearing a criminal case. The Central Criminal Court has exclusive jurisdiction over the following criminal offences:

- treason, encouraging, harbouring, or comforting treason,
- an offence under section 6, 7, or 8 of the Offences Against the State Act 1939,
- piracy,
- genocide,
- a severe breach of the Geneva Conventions,
- murder,
- rape, rape under section 4 of the Criminal Law (Rape) (Amendment) Act 1990, and aggravated sexual assault,
- burglary with intent to commit rape, and
- anti-competitive behaviour and abuse of a dominant market position contrary to the Competition Act 2002.

All Central Criminal Court cases are heard in front of a jury of twelve people. The defendant can be convicted on a majority verdict of ten jurors. Appeals from the Central Criminal Court can be made to the Court of Appeal, and the sentence can be appealed as well as the verdict.

== Civil cases ==
The High Court is the court of first instance for all civil cases where the plaintiff is claiming more than €75,000 in damages in ordinary contract and tort claims, or €60,000 in damages in personal injuries actions, this being the upper limit of the jurisdiction of the Circuit Court.

By virtue of its full original jurisdiction under the Constitution, however, theoretically a civil action of any value may commence in the High Court.

The High Court has full chancery powers to grant any injunction or declaration that could be granted by a court of chancery. Petitions to windup companies and various company law remedies are heard by the High Court which has exclusive jurisdiction in this area.

The High Court further has exclusive jurisdiction in the area of bankruptcies.

In contentious Probate matters and Family Law, the High Court has concurrent jurisdiction with the Circuit Court over such claims. Non-contentious Probate motions are heard solely by the High Court.

The High Court has full jurisdiction in Admiralty and can exercise jurisdiction under the Brussels Convention on the Arrest of Seagoing Vessels.

The Court also has power of judicial review over the acts of the government and other public bodies, including the decisions of all inferior courts, and decisions made by tribunals of inquiry.

The High Court hears all applications for extradition, both under the European Arrest Warrant system and to non-EU member states.

Appeals from professional disciplinary bodies under the Nurses Act, Medical Practitioners Act and Solicitors Acts are to the High Court.

Any non-criminal judgment or order of the High Court sitting as a court of first instance may be appealed to the Supreme Court save as provided for by statute.

The High Court also hears civil and family law appeals from the Circuit Court and when hearing such an appeal its decision is final and there is no right of further appeal. The High Court sits outside of Dublin to hear appeals from trials from circuits other than the Dublin Circuit and is known as the "High Court on Circuit".

Statutory appeals on points of law can be made to the High Court from the District Court and various statutory bodies and consultative cases on a point of law can be stated to the High Court from the District Court, various statutory bodies or an arbitrator hearing an arbitration.

== History ==
The current High Court is the fourth court in Ireland to bear that name. The first High Court – the High Court of Justice in Ireland – was created by the Supreme Court of Judicature Act (Ireland) 1877. This fused the administration of common law and equity in Ireland (as had been done in England several years earlier under the Judicature Acts). The existing four superior courts, the Court of King's Bench (Ireland), Court of Chancery, Court of Exchequer, and Court of Common Pleas were merged to form the High Court of Justice, although they remained as divisions of the new court, and the building which housed them is called the Four Courts to this day. However, in Ireland, the divisions of the High Court other than the King's Bench Division and Chancery Division were abolished by 1907. The Government of Ireland Act 1920 split the court into separate courts for Northern Ireland (the High Court of Justice in Northern Ireland and the High Court of Justice in Southern Ireland). Judges of the existing Court became judges of the Southern Ireland court unless they elected otherwise. With the enactment of the Constitution of the Irish Free State, the High Court became the High Court of Justice in Saorstát Éireann.

After the establishment of the Irish Free State, the Courts of Justice Act 1924 created a new courts system. The High Court of Justice was the only court from the pre-independence era to keep its name (and substantially, the same jurisdiction). However, the divisions were now completely abolished and any judge of the High Court could now hear any suit at either common law or equity. A new office of President of the High Court was established, as the previous judicial offices (Lord Chief Justice of Ireland, Vice-Chancellor, and Master of the Rolls in Ireland) were abolished under this Act. Most of the existing judges retired at this time and new judges were appointed.

After the enactment of the Constitution of Ireland, the Courts Acts 1961 established a new High Court as required by the Constitution. However this Court was in both form and name substantially identical to that established under the 1924 Act. This court is simply known as the High Court.

=== Significant rulings ===
- 1977 – Norris v. The Attorney General (criminalisation of homosexuality upheld)
- 1987 – Kennedy v. Ireland (right to privacy)

== Judges ==
Judges of the High Court deal with both civil and criminal matters, and have full original jurisdiction. When the High Court deals with criminal cases, it sits as the Central Criminal Court.

In court, ordinary judges are directly addressed as "Judge" (in Irish, "a Bhreithimh") or in the third person as "The Court". The President of the High Court is to be addressed by their title. In writing, judges should be described as "The Honourable Mr/Mrs/Ms/Miss Justice Murphy", which is typically abbreviated in judgements as "Murphy J." ("Murphy P." in the case of the president). Prior to 2006, judges were traditionally addressed in court as "My Lord" (whether male or female), following the British tradition, although this was never contained in the Rules of the Superior Courts.

The President of the Circuit Court may sit as an additional High Court judge and occasional other Circuit Court judges are temporarily assigned to sit ex officio as High Court judges. The Chief Justice of Ireland is additionally an ex officio judge of the High Court.

=== High Court judges ===
==== Ex officio members ====
Name	Office
Donal O'Donnell	Chief Justice
Caroline Costello	President of the Court of Appeal
Patricia Ryan	President of the Circuit Court

=== Presidents of the High Court since 1924 ===
The office of President of the High Court was created under the Courts of Justice Act 1924. Before 1924, the Master of the Rolls in Ireland was the President of the High Court.

Name	Term of office
Timothy Sullivan	1924–1936
Conor Maguire	1936–1946
George Gavan Duffy	1946–1951
Cahir Davitt	1951–1966
Aindrias Ó Caoimh	1966–1974
Thomas Finlay	1974–1985
Liam Hamilton	1985–1994
Harry Whelehan	15–17 Nov 1994
Declan Costello	1995–1998
Frederick Morris	1998–2001
Joseph Finnegan	2001–2006
Richard Johnson	2006–2009
Nicholas Kearns	2009–2015
Peter Kelly	2015–2020
Mary Irvine	2020–2022
David Barniville	2022–present

== Master of the High Court ==
The Master of the High Court is an official attached to the court with the power to make a range of minor interlocutory orders and give judgement in uncontested matters. Although based on the common-law master of the English judiciary, the master in Ireland is not a judge, but rather a "quasi-judicial office holder". The office of master of the High Court was established in 1926. Its functions are specified in Order 63 of the Rules of the Superior Courts. Originally, the master also had any residual powers of court officers whose posts were abolished in 1924 but whose powers were not transferred elsewhere.

Although a barrister rather than a judge, the master holds hearings on original jurisdiction applications. These hearings, at which documentary evidence may be presented, are unofficially called the Master's Court. In 2008–2013, the master made 2,922 to 4,763 orders per annum, and issued between one and four rulings.

Patrick Lindsay was the master from 1975 to 1984 and Harry Hill between 1984 and 2001. Edmund Honohan was made master in May 2001. Since his retirement in April 2022, the position has been vacant with the deputy master presiding.

== See also ==
- Courts of the Republic of Ireland

== Sources ==
- "Court Officers Act, 1926". Irish Statute Book. Archived from the original on 13 January 2015.
