= Irish Times Debate =

Third level debating competition, Ireland

- Status: Active
- Genre: Debate
- Date: 1960
- Country: Ireland
- Founders: Union of Students in Ireland; The Irish Times

The Irish Times National Debating Championship is a debating competition for students in higher education in Ireland. It has been run since 1960, sponsored by The Irish Times. While most participants represent institutions in the Republic of Ireland, institutions in Northern Ireland are also eligible.

== History ==
The Union of Students in Ireland approached The Irish Times in 1960 to secure sponsorship for an Irish equivalent of the Observer Mace, a debating competition started in Britain in 1954. The "Debating Union of Ireland" was formed for a time, but later The Irish Times would appoint a student convenor each year, often a previous year's winner. Until the 1970s, the best teams and individual went on to compete in the final of the Observer Mace. (The Mace no longer has an individual competition.)

In 1979, Gary Holbrook of Metropolitan State College of Denver was on sabbatical at Trinity College Dublin and was impressed with the debate. In 1980, he persuaded Coors Brewers to sponsor a debate tour of U.S. colleges for the winning team and individual speakers. The Irish were struck there by the very different approach of American debaters. Holbrook subsequently organised "Friends of the Irish Debate", sponsored by The Irish Times and Aer Lingus, to make the tour annual. The tour is now organised by the U.S. National Parliamentary Debate Association.

In 2010, a special celebration marked the debate's 50th anniversary.

== Format ==
The competition is generally considered the most prestigious in Ireland, due in part to the additional media attention provided by its sponsor, but also the status of some of the former winners, and the US tour which forms part of the prize. Running between November and February, it operates on a knockout basis, with the initial entrants (usually between 150 and 170 teams) being whittled down over successive rounds, culminating in a Grand Final with four teams and four individuals competing for team honours (The Demosthenes Trophy) and an individual prize (The Christina Murphy Memorial Trophy).

The format of the competition is now unique in third-level debating, combining team and individual roles. The first round consists solely of team entrants, from which both teams and individuals progress, thus creating subsequent rounds featuring both. Individuals may be selected from a team at any stage of the competition, including to win the competition at the final stage. The winning individual cannot be selected from the winning team, though this restriction was not observed in the 1972 competition, where Donal Deeny took both prizes. In that year, the judges nominated Kathleen Boyle to progress to the Observer Mace individual competition.

The only other competition to adopt the same format is the All-Ireland Schools' Debating Competition.

== Winners ==
=== By year ===
| Year | Team Society | Team Speaker 1 | Team Speaker 2 | Individual Society | Individual Speaker |
|---|---|---|---|---|---|
| 1960 | King's Inns | Aidan Browne | Charles Lysaght | TCD Hist | Neville Keery |
| 1961 | TCD Phil | Hallam Johnston | Jack Daniels | UCD L&H | Peter Donnelly |
| 1962 | QUB | John Murtagh | Michael Egan | TCD Hist | Ian Blake |
| 1963 | UCD L&H | Patrick Cosgrave | Anthony Clare | RCSI | Desmond King |
| 1964 | UCD L&H | Patrick Cosgrave | Anthony Clare | King's Inns | Terry McMahon |
| 1965 | TCD Hist | David McConnell | Cian Ó hÉigeartaigh | QUB Literific | Eamonn McCann |
| 1966 | TCD Hist | David McConnell | Cian Ó hÉigeartaigh | UCD L&H | Esmond Smyth |
| 1967 | UCC Philosoph | Donnchadh Ó Corráin | Anthony J. Adolph | King's Inns | Kevin O'Higgins |
| 1968 | UCD L&H | Roddy Buckley | Dermot Gleeson | UCD L&H | Henry Kelly |
| 1969 | QUB | Brendan Keenan | Derek Davis | UCC Philosoph | Anthony J. Adolph |
| 1970 | UCD L&H | Neal Clarke | Donal O'Riain | UCD L&H | Adrian Hardiman |
| 1971 | TCD Hist | Donnell Deeny | Gregory Murphy | DIT Bolton Street | Marian Finucane |
| 1972 | TCD Hist | Donnell Deeny | Frank Bannister | TCD Hist (St Mary's, Belfast) | Donnell Deeny (Kathleen Boyle) |
| 1973 | QUB | Billy McRory | Jimmy Hughes | UCD L&H | Adrian Hardiman |
| 1974 | TCD Hist | David O'Sullivan | James Connolly | NUU | Alex Lowry |
| 1975 | NUU | Michael Hughes | Kevin Cahill | King's Inns | Brian Curtin |
| 1976 | UCD L&H | Paul Gill | Gerry Danaher | Maynooth | Deirdre Murphy |
| 1977 | Maynooth | Patrick Hennessy | Gerry Maher | UCD L&H | Patrick Healy |
| 1978 | UCD Law Soc | Conor Gearty | Donal O'Donnell | King's Inns | Turlough O'Donnell |
| 1979 | UCD Law Soc | Conor Gearty | John O'Donnell | UCD L&H | Maurice Biggar |
| 1980 | UCD L&H | Maurice Biggar | Eugene McCague | King's Inns | Brian Havel |
| 1981 | UCD L&H | Charlie Meenan | Gerry Stembridge | TCD Hist | Sean Moran |
| 1982 | TCD Phil | Michael Byrne | Gerry Foley | UCC Philosoph | Liam Plant |
| 1983 | UCG Lit & Deb | Eoin O'Maoileoin | Damian Crawford | TCD Hist | Bill Maguire |
| 1984 | TCD Hist | Eoin McCullough | Brian Murray | UCD L&H | Pat Whyms |
| 1985 | UCC Philosoph | David Holland | Brian Hassett | TCD Hist | Gideon Taylor |
| 1986 | TCD Phil | Declan McCavana | David Keane | UCG Lit & Deb | Brendan Wilkins |
| 1987 | TCD Hist | Aidan Kane | Paul Gavin | UCG Lit & Deb | Conor Bowman |
| 1988 | UCC Philosoph | Adrian Hunt | Tim Murphy | UCC Philosoph | Robert Plant |
| 1989 | King's Inns | Maeve Collins | Pat Twomey | UCD Law Soc | Julian Clare |
| 1990 | UCC Philosoph | Brendan Lenihan | Don O'Sullivan | Cadet School | Tom Clonan |
| 1991 | King's Inns | Tim O'Leary | Pat Treacy | UCD L&H | Barra Faughnan |
| 1992 | UCD L&H | Johanna Farrelly | Pat O'Keeffe | UCD Law Soc | Cian Ferriter |
| 1993 | TCD Hist | Brendan Foley | Gavan Titley | UCC Philosoph | Kieran Healy |
| 1994 | UCD L&H | Dara Ó Briain | Marcus Dowling | King's Inns | Bernard Dunleavy |
| 1995 | UCC Philosoph | Alan Roberts | Diarmuid Conway | UCC Philosoph | Gerry Hyde |
| 1996 | King's Inns | Helen Boyle | Paul McDermott | TCD Hist | Douglas Clarke |
| 1997 | UL Debating Union | Seamus Doran | Padraic O'Halloran | SADSI | Matthew McCabe |
| 1998 | UCC Philosoph | Muireann Ní Chinnéide | Elizabeth Barrett | TCD Hist | Paul Gleeson |
| 1999 | UCD L&H | Caoilfhionn Gallagher | Bernadette Quigley | King's Inns | Rossa Fanning |
| 2000 | King's Inns | Michael Deasy | Rónán Mullen | SADSI | Louise Rouse |
| 2001 | TCD Hist | Bríd McGrath | Yvonne Campbell | TCD Hist | Aoife Titley |
| 2002 | TCD Hist | Louie Mooney | Brendan Kelly | UCC Philosoph | Conor Buckley |
| 2003 | UCD L&H | Leo Mulrooney | Colm Coyne | TCD Hist | Alison McIntyre |
| 2004 | DCU | Ian Kehoe | Michael Moriarty | King's Inns | Paul Brady |
| 2005 | King's Inns | David Whelan | Sam Collins | UCD L&H | Frank Kennedy |
| 2006 | King's Inns | Barry Glynn | Mark Murphy | UCC Philosoph | Diarmuid Early |
| 2007 | TCD Hist | David Boughton | Ciaran Denny | King's Inns | David Quinn |
| 2008 | TCD Hist | Christopher Kissane | David Kenny | UCD L&H | Stephen Boyle |
| 2009 | TCD Hist | John Gallagher | Andrea Mulligan | UCD L&H | Jeremy Kinsella |
| 2010 | TCD Hist | Niamh Ní Mhaoileoin | Niall Sherry | Griffith College Dublin | Sean O'Quigley |
| 2011 | King's Inns | Lorcan Price | Áine Hartigan | TCD Law Soc | Mark Thuillier |
| 2012 | RCSI | Eoin Kelleher | Elizabeth Ahern-Flynn | UCD Med Soc | Michael Conroy |
| 2013 | TCD Phil Bram Stoker Club | Liam Brophy | John Engle | TCD Hist | Kate Brady |
| 2014 | SADSI | Dearbhla O'Gorman | Kieran O'Sullivan | UCD Med Soc | William Courtney |
| 2015 | TCD Phil | Rónán O'Connor | Hugh Guidera | UCD L&H | Eoin MacLachlan |
| 2016 | SADSI | Ross O'Mahony | Aaron Vickery | UCD L&H | Clíodhna Ní Chéileachair |
| 2017 | UCD Law | Aisling Tully | Dara Keenan | SADSI | Leah Morgan |
| 2018 | UCD Law | Cian Leahy | Aodhán Peelo | UCD L&H | Amy Crean |
| 2019 | TCD Hist | Ronan Daly | Daniel Gilligan | King's Inns | Kevin Roche |
| 2020 | TCD Phil | Eoghan Quinn | Aislinn Carty | UCD L&H | Rachael Mullally |
| 2021 | Maynooth | Rí Anumudu | Chikemka Abuchi-Ogbonda | TCD Hist | Gabrielle Fullam |
| 2022 | SADSI | Ross Merriman | Conor White | UCD Law | Bevin Armstrong |
| 2023 | SADSI | Ailbhe Noonan | Gavin Dowd | MTU Debating Society | Oliver McKenna |
| 2024 | King's Inns | Ciara McLoughlin | Ceara Tonna-Barthet | SADSI | Clíodhna McHugh |
| 2025 | UCD L&H | Adrianne Ward | Rob Fitzpatrick | Lit & Deb University of Galway | Liam Boyce |
| 2026 | TCD Hist | Anya Wilson | Athena Wu | SADSI | Cian Carew |

=== By society ===
| Society | University | Team wins | Individual wins |
|---|---|---|---|
| College Historical Society (Hist) | Trinity College Dublin | 16 | 11 |
| Literary and Historical Society (L&H) | University College Dublin | 12 | 15 |
| Law Students' Debating Society of Ireland | King's Inns | 9 | 10 |
| UCC Philosophical Society (Philosoph) | University College Cork | 6 | 7 |
| Literary and Scientific Society (Literific) – | Queen's University Belfast | 3 | 1 |
| University Philosophical Society (Phil) | Trinity College, Dublin | 4 | 0 |
| Law Society | University College Dublin | 3 | 3 |
| Solicitors' Apprentice Debating Society of Ireland | Law Society of Ireland | 3 | 5 |
| Literary and Debating Society (Lit & Deb) | University of Galway | 1 | 3 |
| RCSI Debating Society | Royal College of Surgeons in Ireland | 1 | 1 |
| – | New University of Ulster | 1 | 1 |
| – | St. Patrick's College, Maynooth | 1 | 1 |
| – | Dublin City University | 1 | 0 |
| Law Society | Trinity College Dublin | 1 | 0 |
| Bram Stoker Club | Trinity College Dublin | 1 | 0 |
| – | University of Limerick | 1 | 0 |
| – | Griffith College Dublin | 0 | 1 |
| – | Cadet School | 0 | 1 |
| – | Dublin Institute of Technology | 0 | 1 |
| Medicine Society | University College Dublin | 0 | 2 |

== Notable participants ==
Many winners have gone on to have successful careers in law. Former winners in the legal field include Chief Justice of the Supreme Court of Ireland Donal O'Donnell, Supreme Court judge Adrian Hardiman, former Managing Partner and Chairman of Arthur Cox (law firm) Eugene McCague, High Court of Ireland judges David Holland (judge) and Cian Ferriter, Senior Counsels Paul Anthony McDermott, Rossa Fanning, John O'Donnell, Dermot Gleeson, Aidan Browne, and Gregory Murphy, King's Counsel at Doughty Street Chambers, Caoilfhionn Gallagher, professors Conor Gearty, Kieran Healy and Charles Lysaght, and Circuit Court judges Esmond Smyth, Kevin O'Higgins, and Brian Curtin. James Connolly, winner in 1974, was Vice Chairman of the Bar Council of Ireland and recently chair of public inquiries in Dublin.

David O'Sullivan, winner in 1974, became secretary general to the President of the European Commission. Maeve Collins, winner in 1989, is a former Irish Ambassador to Vietnam and now a Director General within the Irish Department for Foreign Affairs. Neville Keery, 1960 winner, was a member of the 12th Seanad, and later Head of Libraries of the European Commission.

Other well-known former winners include broadcasters Anthony Clare, Henry Kelly, Derek Davis, Cian Ó hÉigeartaigh, and Marian Finucane; comedian Dara Ó Briain; and writers Eamonn McCann, Gerry Stembridge, Kevin Cahill. The losing finalists in 1966 included future Presidents Mary Robinson and Michael D. Higgins. Tánaiste Mary Harney and Minister Mary Hanafin also appeared as finalists.
