= Robert Eagar =

Irish judge

Judge of the High Court
- In office 30 October 2014 – 17 January 2023
- Nominated by: Government of Ireland
- Appointed by: Michael D. Higgins

Personal details
- Died: 1 November 2024
- Education: University College Dublin; Law Society of Ireland

Robert Eagar (died 1 November 2024) was an Irish judge who served as a Judge of the High Court from 2014 to 2023.

== Early life ==
Eagar was educated at University College Dublin from where he graduated with a BCL degree in 1977. He attended the Law Society of Ireland and was added to the Roll of Solicitors in 1978.

== Legal career ==
He began his career as a solicitor at the Office of the Chief State Solicitor, a constituent part of the Office of the Attorney General, working there until 1984. In 1982, he was involved in proceedings in the Circuit Court involving a licensing request by the owner of the Stardust nightclub. He was the prosecuting solicitor in a case against Vinnie Doyle and the Irish Independent for a breach of the Official Secrets Act.

He joined the law firm of Garrett Sheehan in 1984, becoming a partner in 1995. His expertise as a solicitor was in criminal law, extradition, asylum law, human rights law and child law. He represented an anti-war activist convicted of damage to US military property, fugitive solicitor Michael Lynn, the former company secretary of Anglo Irish Bank on trial for tax offences, and a Christian Brother accused of 110 charges of indecent assault. He also acted as a solicitor for clients accused of murder and fraud. He acted in cases involving judicial review in the Supreme Court of Ireland and cases in the Court of Criminal Appeal.

In 2008, he called for the Minister for Justice Brian Lenihan Jnr to fund an independent forensic laboratory.

He was a member of the Law Society's Criminal Law Committee and a lecturer in criminal law. He was a chair of the Dublin Simon Community, a founder of the Irish Refugee Council and board member of the Ranelagh Multi-Denominational School.

== Judicial career ==
Eagar was appointed a Judge of the High Court in October 2014. He was the presiding judge in cases involving criminal law, defamation law, equality law, medical negligence, judicial review, and refugee law.

He presided over cases in the Special Criminal Court. He was the judge in bail hearings involving Lisa Smith and those accused of the murder of Ana Kriégel and the kidnapping of Kevin Lunney.

He was a designated judge to report to the Taoiseach on the operation of the Criminal Justice (Surveillance) Act 2009.

He retired as judge in January 2023.

== Personal life ==
Eagar was married to Monica and had two daughters.

Eagar died on 1 November 2024.
