= Lit & Deb =

Lit & Deb, an abbreviation for 'Literary and Debating', may refer to a number of debating and literary societies:

- Literary and Debating Society (Maynooth University)
- Literary and Debating Society (University of Galway)
