= David Keane =

David or Dave Keane may refer to:

- David Keane (judge) (born 1964), Irish judge
- David Keane (politician), English politician
- Dave Keane (born 1956), Irish hurler

== See also ==
- David McKean (disambiguation)
