= Cian Ferriter =

Irish barrister, High Court judge

The Hon. Mr. Justice Cian Ferriter

Judge of the High Court
- Incumbent
- Assumed office 5 October 2021
- Nominated by: Government of Ireland
- Appointed by: Michael D. Higgins

Personal details
- Education: University College Dublin; King's Inns

Cian Ferriter is an Irish judge and lawyer who has served as a Judge of the High Court since October 2021. He previously practiced as a barrister specialising in commercial and media law.

== Early life ==
Ferriter attended secondary school at St Benildus College in Kilmacud, County Dublin, until 1986. He studied at University College Dublin, graduating with a BCL degree in 1993 and an arbitration diploma in 2000. He was the auditor of the University College Dublin Law Society between 1991 and 1992 and was the individual winner of the Irish Times Debate in 1992.

His brother Diarmaid Ferriter is Professor of Modern Irish History at University College Dublin.

He was the moderator of the second series of the television programme The Blackbird And The Bell on RTÉ One.

== Legal career ==
He became a member of the Irish bar in 1998 and a senior counsel in 2011. He has been involved in cases involving injunctions, insolvency law, tax law, company law, procurement law and intellectual property law. Among parties he represented were the estate of James Joyce, the Criminal Assets Bureau, Brian Curtin, Dublin Airport Authority, Anglo Irish Bank, the National Asset Management Agency and Google.

He has acted for financial institutions in debt enforcement cases, including the Bank of Ireland in enforcement actions against Brian O'Donnell and Everyday Finance against Ivor Callely. He was counsel for John Gilligan in a 2003 appeal to a conviction for possession of drugs for supply and for Thomas Murphy in 2007 in a challenge against the Criminal Asset Bureau. He was appointed to represent the Garda Commissioner at the Barr Tribunal and represented the Mahon Tribunal in a High Court action taken by Bertie Ahern. He was counsel for Tomasz Zalewski in the Supreme Court of Ireland who successfully challenged the constitutionality of aspects of the Workplace Relations Commission.

Ferriter frequently appeared in defamation cases, acting for RTÉ in actions taken by the politicians Beverley Flynn and Joe Costello, for Independent News & Media against Monica Leech and for The Irish Times against Maurice McCabe.

The Central Bank of Ireland appointed him chairperson of the Irish Takeover Panel in June 2018. In 2019, he became a board member of the Irish Traditional Music Archive and Poetry Ireland.

== Judicial career ==
Ferriter was nominated to the High Court in September 2021. He was appointed on 5 October 2021.

He has presided over cases involving refugee law, judicial review, personal insolvency, medical negligence and personal injuries.

== Personal life ==
He lives in Dublin and writes poetry. He was the winner of the 2019 Westival International Poetry Competition and runner up of the 2020 Gregory O’Donoghue International Poetry Competition.
