= Daniel O'Keeffe (judge) =

Chair of the Standards in Public Office Commission
- In office 11 February 2014 – 10 February 2020
- Nominated by: Government of Ireland
- Appointed by: Michael D. Higgins
- Preceded by: Matthew Smith
- Succeeded by: Garrett Sheehan

Judge of the High Court
- In office 6 November 2008 – 21 December 2013
- Nominated by: Government of Ireland
- Appointed by: Mary McAleese

Chair of the Irish Takeover Panel
- In office 21 January 1998 – 6 November 2008
- Nominated by: Government of Ireland
- Preceded by: New office
- Succeeded by: Rory Brady

Personal details
- Education: University College Dublin; King's Inns

Daniel O'Keeffe is a retired Irish judge who served as Chair of the Standards in Public Office Commission from 2014 to 2020, a Judge of the High Court from 2008 to 2013, and Chair of the Irish Takeover Panel from 1998 to 2008.

As Chairman of the Standards in Public Office Commission, he was also an ex-officio member of the Commission for Public Service Appointments. He is also a member of the Inquiry Panel appointed by the Central Bank of Ireland.

He was Chairman of the Second Report of the Public Service Benchmarking Body which reported to the Minister for Finance in 2007.

== Education and career ==
He was educated at Clongowes Wood College. He was called to the Bar in 1964 having graduated from University College Dublin and the King's Inns. He was appointed a Senior Counsel in 1985. He practised at the Bar until his appointment to the High Court in 2008.

He qualified as a Chartered Accountant.
