= Irish Takeover Panel =

Irish regulator for company mergers and acquisitions

The Irish Takeover Panel is the statutory body responsible for monitoring and supervising takeovers and other relevant transactions in relevant companies in Ireland. It was established by the Irish Takeover Panel Act 1997. The Panel is designated as the competent Irish authority for the purpose of the Takeover Directive 2004/25/EC. It is incorporated as a company limited by guarantee. It makes Annual Reports to the Minister for Enterprise, Tourism and Employment.

== Governance ==
The Members of the Panel are representative of bodies professionally involved in the securities markets and in the field of takeovers: the Consultative Committee of Accountancy Bodies – Ireland, the Law Society of Ireland, the Irish Association of Investment Managers, the Banking and Payments Federation Ireland, and the Irish Stock Exchange plc. Each of these bodies appoints a Director to the Board of the Panel, and may also appoint alternate Directors. The Governor of the Central Bank of Ireland appoints the Chairperson and Deputy Chairperson to the Board, currently Cian Ferriter S.C. (Chairperson) and Ann Fitzgerald (Deputy Chairperson).

== List of Chairpersons of the Panel ==
The Chairperson of the Panel is appointed by the Governor of the Central Bank of Ireland.

Name (Birth–Death)	Term of office
Mr Justice Daniel O'Keeffe (1943–)	1998–2008
Rory Brady S.C. (1957–2010)	2008–2010
Denis McDonald, S.C.	2010–2018
Cian Ferriter, S.C.	2018–
