= David Holland (judge) =

Irish High Court judge, barrister

The Hon. Mr. Justice David Holland

Judge of the High Court
- Incumbent
- Assumed office 5 October 2021
- Nominated by: Government of Ireland
- Appointed by: Michael D. Higgins

Personal details
- Education: University College Cork; King's Inns

David Holland is an Irish judge and lawyer who has served as a Judge of the High Court since October 2021. He previously practised as a barrister.

== Early life ==
Holland attended school at Clongowes Wood College. He obtained a BCL degree, graduating from University College Cork in 1985. He was a winner of the Irish Times Debate in 1985, representing the UCC Philosophical Society.

== Legal career ==
He was called to the Irish bar in 1987 and became a senior counsel in 2003. He has an expertise in planning law and environmental law.

He has acted in cases involving media law, insolvency law, injunctions and medical negligence.

In 2003, he represented several newspapers against a libel action taken by Ian Bailey. He acted for a woman who had been abused while in school in a case taken against the Government of Ireland in O'Keeffe v. Ireland in the European Court of Human Rights. He provided legal advice to the Monageer Inquiry.

== Judicial career ==
Holland was one of five barristers nominated to the High Court in September 2021. He was appointed on 5 October 2021.

He is a judge designated to hear judicial review cases involving strategic housing developments and has heard proceedings in that context involving planning. He has also heard cases involving debt recovery, insurance law and partnership law.
