= Michael Peart =

Michael Peart may refer to:

- Michael Peart (politician), Jamaican politician
- Michael Peart (judge) (born 1953), Irish judge
