= UCC Philosophical Society =

Debating society at University College Cork, Ireland

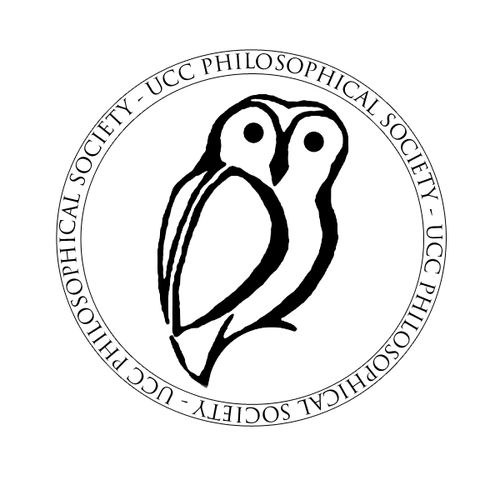
- Formation: 1850
- Type: Student society
- Parent organization: University College Cork

The UCC Philosophical Society, also known as the 'Philosoph', is the largest debating society at University College Cork, Ireland. The society, which was founded in 1850, carries out a number of functions, including weekly debates with guest speakers, participating in debating competitions, running workshops for the students of UCC to develop their public speaking skills and running debating competitions and workshops for schoolchildren (including the Denny Schools Debating Competition). In the 1960s, the Nobel Peace Prize winner Seán MacBride described the Philosoph as "the centre of independent thought in Ireland". House meetings of the society are held every Monday evening during UCC's term time.

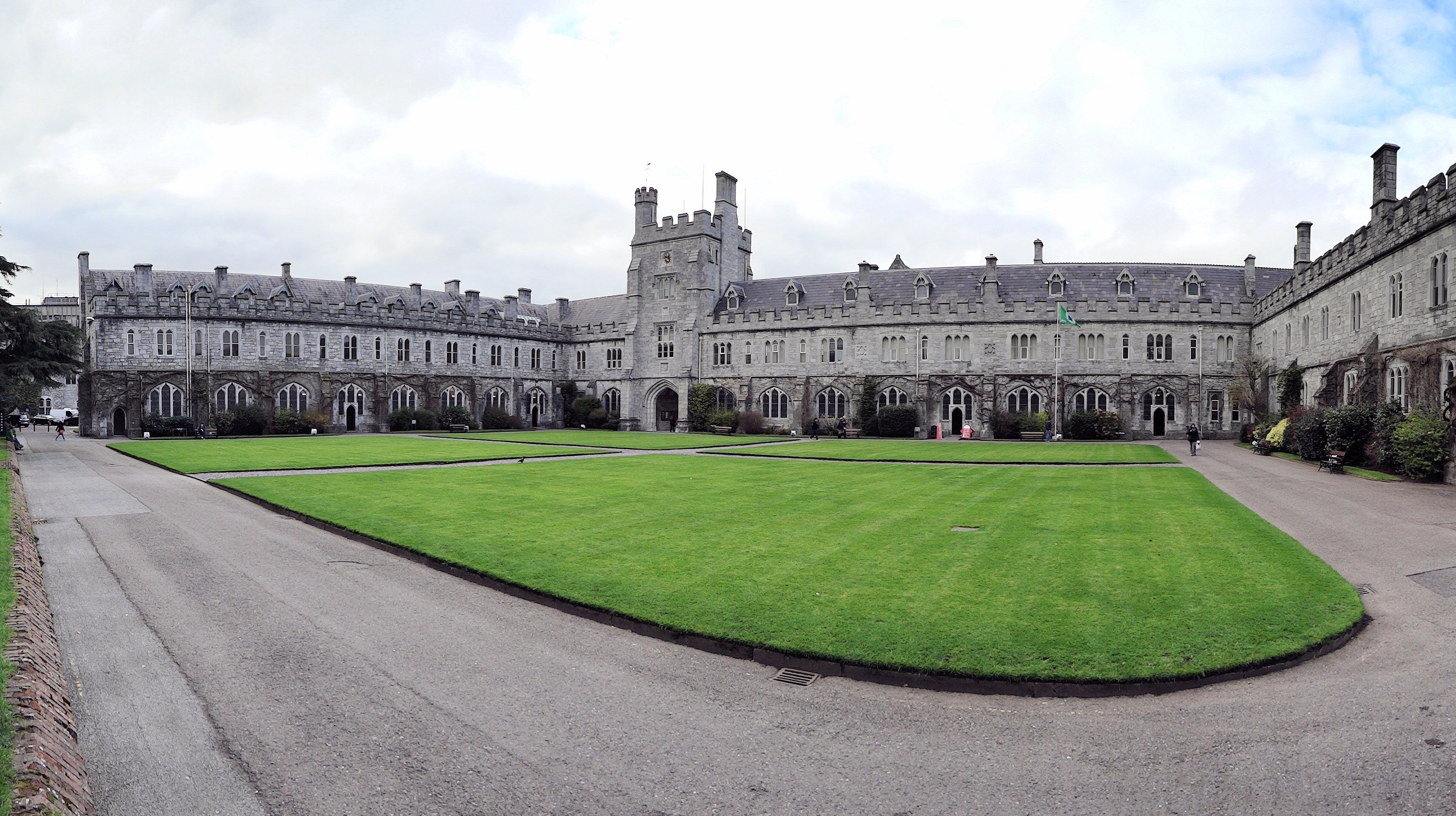
UCC Quadrangle

== Former members ==
Seán Ó Riada was a former auditor of the society, and former presidents include Charles Haughey. Other former members include professor Kieran Healy of the University of Arizona. Journalist Brendan O' Connor was a former recording secretary.

== Competitions ==
In addition to running internal debating competitions, the society funds and supports members in attending competitions elsewhere in Ireland and internationally. Intervarsity competitions in Ireland and the UK, in which the society participates, have included the UCD Vice-President's Cup, the Oxford Union and Cambridge Union Intervarsities and the National Law Debates in Galway. The society has also previously entered the John Smith Memorial Mace and the Irish Times Debate.

Internationally, the society participates in the World Universities Debating Competition and the European Universities Debating Competition, and has had some success in international debating. For example, two UCC debaters members won the World University Debating Championship at Fordham University in 1986.

The society also hosts competitions, and for example, was the venue for the World University Debating Championships in 1996 and in 2009. The 2009 event was jointly hosted by UCC's Law Society and Philosophical Society.

The Philosoph also hosts its own Inter-Varsity each December and previously hosted the Cork Invitational Intervarsity (IV).

== See also ==
- College Historical Society (Trinity College, Dublin)
- University Philosophical Society (Trinity College, Dublin)
- Literary and Historical Society, University College Dublin
- Literary and Debating Society (NUI Galway)
- Literary and Debating Society (Maynooth University)
- Law Society, University College Dublin
