= Senate of Ireland (disambiguation) =

The Senate of Ireland (Seanad Éireann) is the current upper house of the Oireachtas (Irish legislature).

Senate of Ireland may also refer to:

- Senate of Northern Ireland (1921–1972), the upper house of the Parliament of Northern Ireland
- Senate of Southern Ireland (1922), the upper house of the Parliament of Southern Ireland
- Senate of the Irish Free State (1922–1936), the upper house of the Oireachtas (parliament) of the Irish Free State
