= David Keane (judge) =

Irish barrister, High Court judge since 2013

The Hon. Mr. Justice David Keane

Judge of the High Court
- Incumbent
- Assumed office 25 July 2013
- Nominated by: Government of Ireland
- Appointed by: Michael D. Higgins

Personal details
- Born: 19 August 1964 (age 62) London, England
- Education: Trinity College Dublin; Law Society of Ireland; University College Dublin; King's Inns

David Keane (born 19 August 1964) is an Irish judge and lawyer who has served as a Judge of the High Court since July 2013.

== Early life ==
Keane was born in London in 1964. He attended Rockwell College and studied law at Trinity College Dublin. At Trinity, he was the President of the University Philosophical Society and won the Irish Times Debate. He obtained an LLM from University College Dublin in European Union law in 1997.

== Legal career ==
He first qualified as a solicitor in 1992 and then converted to become a barrister in 1998. He became a senior counsel in 2009. He trained and subsequently practised in the offices of future judge Garrett Sheehan and worked at the Chief State Solicitor's Office from 1997 to 1998. His practice at the bar focused on criminal law, administrative law and civil litigation. He was a council member of the Irish Council for Civil Liberties from 1992 to 1994.

He was involved in the cases Heaney & McGuinness v Ireland in relation to Article 6 of the European Convention on Human Rights and Cogley v RTÉ which established rules relating to public interest and defamation in the press. He represented RTÉ at the Barr Tribunal and the Flood Tribunal. He also appeared at the Commission to Inquire into Child Abuse.

== Judicial career ==
In 2008, he was nominated by the Government of Ireland to be one of three candidates to be put forward for election to the European Court of Human Rights. He came in second place to Ann Power, and therefore, he was not elected.

He was appointed a Judge of the High Court in July 2013. Keane was appointed through application to the Judicial Appointments Advisory Board. He has heard cases including those involving matters of family law, liquidation, personal injuries, immigration law, and medical negligence.

He heard a constitutional challenge of electoral gender quotas legislation in 2016 from a Fianna Fáil candidate who was not selected for election. His decision that the plaintiff did not have locus standi was successfully appealed to Supreme Court of Ireland. He presided over a case initiated by Seán Gallagher seeking damages from RTÉ for airing a misleading tweet during a televised debate during the 2011 Irish presidential election. The matter was subsequently resolved outside of court.

In 2018, he accused lawyers of professional misconduct by omitting certain details from their arguments before him in a trial involving the removal order of a Polish citizen from Ireland. He threatened the lawyers in question with having to pay litigation costs, however, no further action was taken by him.

In May 2019, Keane had 22 cases awaiting judgment for at least two months, the highest amount among his High Court colleagues.
