= Deirdre Murphy =

Deirdre Murphy may refer to:

- Deirdre Murphy (cyclist) (1959 – 2014), Olympic cyclist
- Deirdre Murphy (judge) (born 1953), Irish judge
