= Cyril McGuinness =

Irish criminal

- Born: 1964/1965; Cloughran, Swords, County Dublin, Ireland
- Died: 8 November 2019; Fairfield, Derbyshire
- Criminal charges: smuggling illegal transport of waste theft
- Criminal penalty: 7 years imprisonment extradited back to Belgium
- Relatives: Francis McGuinness (brother)

Cyril "Dublin Jimmy" McGuinness (1964/1965 - 8 November 2019) was an Irish convicted criminal with a record for smuggling, illegal transport of waste and theft. He was 54 when he died.

== Early life and family ==
He was originally from Cloughran in Swords, County Dublin, Ireland. As a teenager he worked in scrap metal and was known to Gardaí by the time he was 20.

His brother Francis was estranged from him. His brother is an articulated truck and car dealer. McGuinness' nephew is the politician Conor D. McGuinness, who was not aware he was related until a few years before Cyril McGuinness' death.

Cyril McGuinness reportedly lived for a period in Derrylin, County Fermanagh.

== Criminal history ==
He was banned from driving for 25 years in 1986 and jailed for six months after refusing to stop for Gardaí as they pursued his lorry through north County Dublin in 1984. After his conviction he was led from Balbriggan courthouse while handcuffed to a Garda. He shouted "bastard" at a Garda sergeant who had testified against him and "violently spat" in the sergeants' face.

Although he was described as a Republican, Gardaí believed that his real motivation was money and that he had no political beliefs. He did supply vehicles to the Provisional IRA and was heavily involved with paramilitaries in smuggling laundered fuel, alcohol and cigarettes, however.

In 1986 he was also convicted of perjury after he asked another man to testify that McGuinness was a passenger - not the driver - in a lorry that was pursued by Gardaí in a separate chase. He was given a twelve-month suspended sentence for perjury.

The Gardaí believed that in the 1980s he was seriously involved in handling stolen vehicles as well as smuggling them into Northern Ireland and Britain for resale.

In 1992 he was arrested in Dublin Airport with four forged £20 notes. It took Gardaí three days to discover his real identity because he used up to 12 false identities at the time. Because he was uncooperative with Gardaí and had so many aliases he was remanded in custody for a month before pleading guilty to the charges in court.

At the time of this conviction he had at least three addresses in north County Dublin and one in London, England.

He managed to secure a number of waste disposal contracts from local authorities in his twenties despite having a criminal record. These contracts included those for the disposal of hazardous waste. He used those contracts to engage in fly tipping. Investigations by the Gardaí led to his moving first to County Monaghan, then to County Fermanagh.

In 2004 the BBC Northern Ireland current affairs programme Spotlight exposed him as being involved in the illegal transportation of waste. In 2007, he pleaded guilty to 22 charges related to illegally transporting waste from the Republic of Ireland through Northern Ireland to Scotland and received a suspended sentence.

There were a series of thefts of ATMs in Ireland around 2009 in which he and his gang were suspects.

Twenty trucks and cranes were stolen in Belgium and the Netherlands and brought to Ireland. McGuinness was arrested in a Dublin court when he appeared in relation to charges of theft of an ATM. A European Arrest Warrant was issued for McGuinness in 2008 in which he was described as an active member of an Irish criminal organisation. In April 2008 he was stopped by Serbian police near the Croatian border. He was taken to Belgrade from where he was extradited to Bruges. While there, he was granted bail and left the country, though he was convicted when he was tried in absentia. He was sentenced to seven years imprisonment and was extradited back to Belgium in 2011 to serve his sentence.

== Death ==
His death occurred after a police raid on his home in Fairfield, near Buxton, Derbyshire in November 2019. He was being investigated about the kidnapping of Kevin Lunney. The cause of death was reported to be a heart attack and the death is being investigated by the Independent Office for Police Conduct. The IOPC have verified that police were executing a warrant at his residence at the time he took ill, though they have said there was no evidence a taser was used.
