= Law Society of Northern Ireland =

Northern Irish professional association

- Dlí-Chumann Thuaisceart Éireann

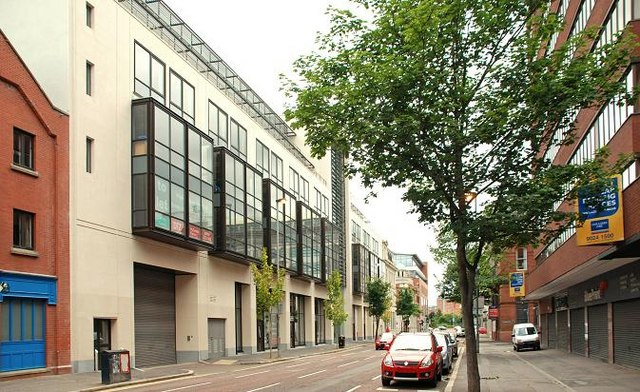
- Law Society House, Belfast
- Predecessor: Law Society of Ireland
- Formation: 10 January 1922
- Type: Professional Body
- Legal status: Chartered
- Purpose: Educational, representative and regulatory
- Headquarters: Law Society House, 96 Victoria Street
- Location: Belfast, Northern Ireland
- Region served: Northern Ireland
- President: Mark Borland
- Senior Vice President: Colin Mitchell
- Junior Vice President: Eoghan McKenna
- Chief Executive: David A Lavery
- Funding: Professional and educational fees
- Website: www.lawsoc-ni.org

The Incorporated Law Society of Northern Ireland, commonly known as the Law Society of Northern Ireland, is a professional body established by Royal Charter granted on 10 July 1922 and whose powers and duties are to regulate the solicitors' profession in Northern Ireland with the aim of protecting the public. It is headquartered in Belfast, Northern Ireland's capital city.

Under the Solicitors (Northern Ireland) Order 1976, the Law Society acts as the regulatory authority governing the education, accounts, discipline and professional conduct of solicitors in order to maintain the independence, ethical standards, professional competence and quality of services offered to the public.

== Relationship with the Law Society of Ireland ==
Prior to the partition of Ireland, solicitors in what became Northern Ireland were regulated by the Law Society of Ireland.

Five seats on the Council of the Law Society of Ireland are reserved for members of the Council of the Law Society of Northern Ireland.

The Law Society of Northern Ireland collaborates with the Law Society of Ireland on various initiatives, including the Irish Rule of Law International and the Solicitors' Benevolent Association.

Northern Ireland-qualified solicitors are entitled to apply to the Law Society of Ireland to be admitted to the Roll of Solicitors in the Republic of Ireland without taking any further examinations. Republic of Ireland-qualified solicitors have a reciprocal eligibility. As of 31 December 2022, 160 solicitors based in Northern Ireland were current members of the Law Society of Ireland.

== History ==
The Law Society of Ireland was established on 24 June 1830 with premises at Inns Quay, Dublin. In November 1830, the committee of the Society submitted a memorial to the benchers as to the ‘necessity and propriety’ of erecting chambers for the use of solicitors with the funds that solicitors had been levied to pay to King's Inns over the years. The committee requested that the hall and chambers for the use of solicitors should be erected away from the King's Inns, and apartments in the Four Courts were allotted by the King's Inns to solicitors in May 1841. However, the adequacy of that accommodation at the Four Courts was to be a bone of contention between the Society and the benchers for 30 years. The first president, Josiah Dunn, was elected in 1842.

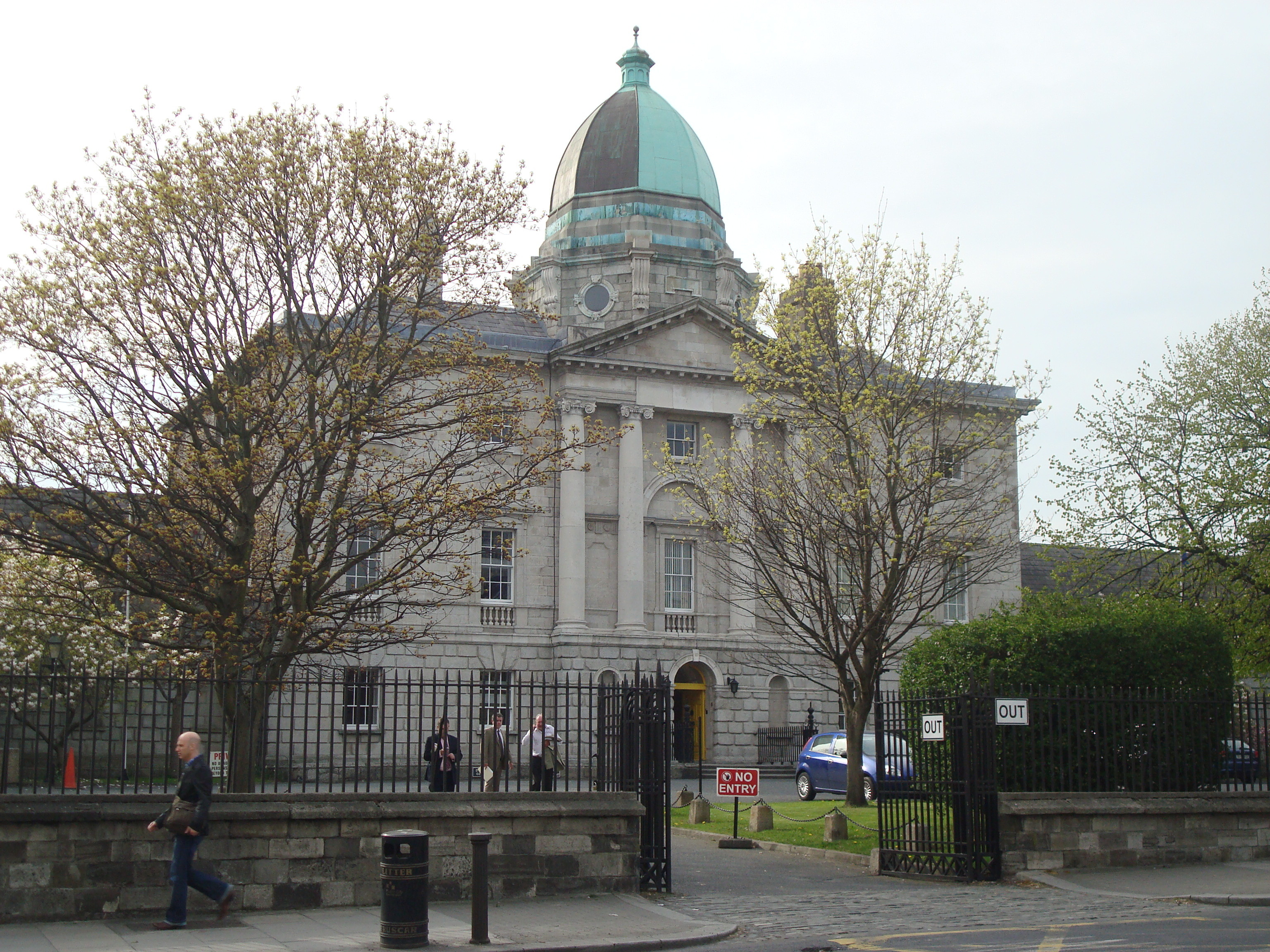
Law Society of Ireland building, Dublin

The Law Society was incorporated by royal charter obtained from Queen Victoria on 5 April 1852 under the name of "the Incorporated Society of Attorneys and Solicitors of Ireland". The charter referred to founding "an institution for facilitating the acquisition of legal knowledge", and for the better and more convenient discharging of professional duties of attorneys and solicitors.

The principal events with which the Law Society was concerned on behalf of solicitors in the second half of the 19th century were the inauguration of a scheme for the education of apprentices, the independence of the solicitors’ profession from the King's Inns, and the achievement of an increasing degree of self-government and recognition of its position as the representative and regulatory body for solicitors in Ireland.

The professions of attorney and solicitor were fused under the Supreme Court of Judicature (Ireland) Act, 1877, and from then on, anyone admitted as solicitor or attorney was to be referred to as solicitor of the Court of Judicature (although the title of attorney lives on in the designation of the chief law officer of the State as the Attorney General). As a consequence, the Law Society was granted a supplemental charter, again by Queen Victoria, on 14 December 1888 under which the Law Society was styled the "Incorporated Law Society of Ireland".

In 1888, the constitution of the Council of the Society was changed by supplemental charter, which provided that the Northern Law Society and Southern Law Association would each be entitled to appoint members to the Council of the Law Society of Ireland.

The legal functions of the Law Society were substantially increased by the Solicitors (Ireland) Act 1898, which transferred control of education and important disciplinary functions from the direct supervision of the judges to that of the Society.

Following the partition of Ireland, the separate Law Society of Northern Ireland was established on 10 July 1922.

== Functions ==
The Law Society has a range of statutory and non-statutory functions. Under the Solicitors (Northern Ireland) Order 1976, the Law Society acts as the regulatory authority governing the education, accounts, discipline and professional conduct of solicitors in order to maintain the independence, ethical standards, professional competence and quality of services offered to the public. The Law Society's non-statutory functions relate to the representation and provision of services to its members and protecting the public interest.

== Education ==
Solicitors in Northern Ireland are trained at the Institute of Professional Legal Studies at Queen's University Belfast.

== Administration ==
The Law Society operates through an elected Council of 30 members, all practising solicitors, who serve on a voluntary basis. The Council is guided by the Presidential and Chief Executive Team which consists of the President, Senior Vice President, Junior President and Chief Executive.

=== Past Presidents ===
- 2005 – Attracta Wilson
- 2006 – Rory McShane
- 2007 – James Cooper
- 2008 – Donald Eakin
- 2009 – Barry Finlay
- 2010 – Norville Connolly
- 2011 – Brian Speers
- 2012 – Imelda McMillan
- 2013 – Michael Robinson
- 2014 – Richard Palmer
- 2015 – Arleen Elliott
- 2016 – John Guerin
- 2017 – Ian Huddleston
- 2018 – Eileen Ewing
- 2019 – Suzanne Rice
- 2020 – Rowan White
- 2021 – Rowan White
- 2022 – Brigid Napier
- 2023 - Brian Archer
- 2024 - Darren Toombs
- 2025 - Colin Mitchell

== Notable solicitors ==
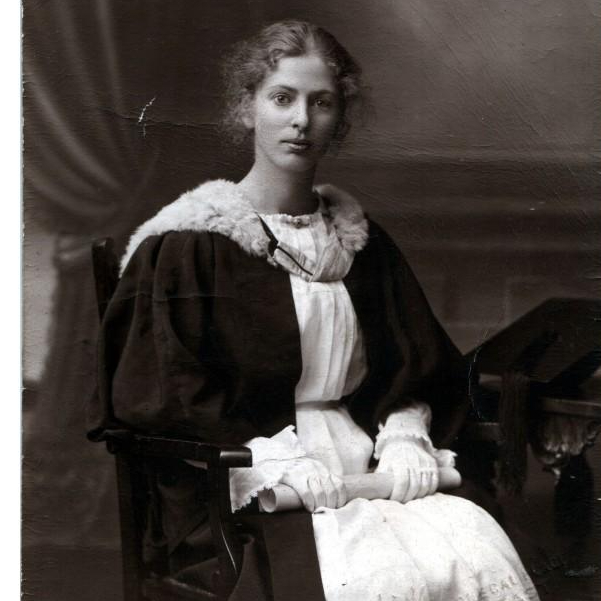
Dorothea Heron

Dorothea Heron was the first woman to be admitted to the roll of solicitors in Ireland, on 17 April 1923. Having commenced her studies prior to the partition of Ireland, she simultaneously qualified to practice on both sides of the newly created border. She did conveyancing work in her uncle's practice in Belfast but didn't take out practising certificates, as was common for non-court-going solicitors at the time.

== See also ==
- Law Society of Ireland, the professional association for solicitors in the Republic of Ireland
- Bar of Northern Ireland, the professional association for barristers in Northern Ireland

== Sources ==
- Hogan, Daire; Hall, Eamonn G., eds. (2002). The Law Society of Ireland, 1852-2002: Portrait of a Profession. Dublin: Four Courts Press. ISBN 1-85182-695-5.
