= Senate of Southern Ireland =

The Senate of Southern Ireland was the upper house of the Parliament of Southern Ireland, established de jure in 1921 under the Government of Ireland Act 1920. The Act stipulated that there be 64 senators, but only 39 were selected and the Senate met only twice before being dissolved: on 28 June and 13 July 1921 in the Council Room of the Department of Agriculture and Technical Instruction in Dublin, now part of Government Buildings.

== Composition ==
The Senate's composition was specified in the Second Schedule of the 1920 act, and the mode and time of selection in the Fourth Schedule. These were similar to those suggested for the Senate in the report of the Irish Convention of 1917–1918. The 64 members were as follows:

- 3 ex officio members:
  - The Lord Chancellor of Ireland, intended as the presiding officer of the Senate. The Lord Chancellor had previously been the chairman of the Irish House of Lords in the Parliament of Ireland prior to its abolition.
  - The Lord Mayor of Dublin and the Lord Mayor of Cork.
- 17 "Representatives of Commerce (including Banking), Labour, and the Scientific and Learned Professions" to be nominated by the Lord Lieutenant of Ireland for a term of 10 years.
- 44 members elected by various interest groups:
  - Elected for a term of 10 years:
    - 4 Archbishops or Bishops of the Roman Catholic Church holding Sees situated wholly or partly in Southern Ireland.
    - 2 Archbishops or Bishops of the Church of Ireland holding Sees situated wholly or partly in Southern Ireland.
    - 16 Peers (not necessarily members of the Peerage of Ireland) who were taxpayers, or ratepayers in respect of property, and had residences, in Southern Ireland.
    - 8 members of the Privy Council of Ireland of no less than two years standing who were taxpayers or ratepayers in respect of property in and had residences in Southern Ireland.
  - 14 representatives of county councils, elected for a term of three years:
    - 4 from each of Leinster, Munster, and Connacht
    - 2 from the three Ulster counties not in Northern Ireland (Cavan, Donegal, and Monaghan)

== Election and boycott ==
The election details were given by Orders in Council on 22 April 1921, which made the Clerk of the Crown and Hanaper the electoral registrar and returning officer. Elections would use single transferable vote, except that groups electing two senators used multiple non-transferable vote. Only electors of a given group could stand in that group's election, except that county council groups could elect non-councillors.

Only 39 of the 64 senators were selected or elected. The Irish Republic declared by Sinn Féin in 1919 rejected the legitimacy of the 1920 act. Sinn Féin had gained control of the county councils in the 1920 local elections. Áine Ceannt as secretary of the General Council of County Councils wrote to the Dáil Ministry asking whether to participate. Only W. T. Cosgrave favoured participation, on the basis that the republic's First Dáil had agreed to use the Southern Ireland Commons election to select the members of the Second Dáil. Other ministers favoured a boycott, both on the principle that the selection process was undemocratic, and on the pragmatic grounds that unionists would have a majority whereas a boycott would leave it inquorate. Accordingly, on 28 April 1921 Austin Stack as Minister for Home Affairs issued a proclamation ordering "that members of County Councils and other bodies who uphold the right of the Irish people to choose their own representatives and Government take no part in the partial election so proposed for the said Senate". The Irish Congress of Trade Unions and Labour Party supported the Republic, and the Catholic hierarchy also refused to co-operate. Of the incomplete membership, many had participated in the Irish Convention.

Of the 39 selected, 27 took the Parliamentary Oath of Allegiance, of whom 19 attended one of the two meetings. Fifteen attended the first and twelve the second, of whom eight attended both. Of the peers and privy councillors, 19 (all bar Cloncurry, Meath, and Westmeath) signed a letter refusing to act as a Senate if the elected Commons were replaced by an appointed "Crown Colony" assembly.

== List ==
Membership of the Senate of Southern Ireland
Class	Name	Attendance	Irish Convention	Free State Seanad	Notes
Lord Chancellor of Ireland	Sir John Ross, Bt	2nd meeting			Ross was too ill to attend the inaugural meeting, before which the Lord Chief Justice of Ireland read the proclamation and during which Sir Nugent Everard was temporary chairman.
Lord Mayor of Dublin	Laurence O'Neill	Boycotted	Member		Independent Nationalist
Lord Mayor of Cork	Donal O'Callaghan	Boycotted	Then incumbent (Thomas C. Butterfield) was a member		Sinn Féin. Elected for Cork Borough in the 1921 election to the House of Commons of Southern Ireland. Article 18(4) of the 1920 Act precluded anyone from sitting in both Houses at once; since O'Callaghan boycotted both, sitting instead in the Second Dáil, the conflict was not resolved.
Commerce	Edward H. Andrews	Both meetings	Member		Former president of Dublin Chamber of Commerce.
Commerce (Retail)	Sir John Arnott, Bt	Did not attend			Of Arnotts department store
Commerce (Farming)	Sir Nugent Everard, Bt	Both meetings		Appointed	
Commerce (Banking)	Henry Guinness	Both meetings		Appointed	
Commerce (Distilling)	Andrew Jameson	1st meeting	Member	Appointed	
Commerce or Professions	Hugh Patterson Glenn	Both meetings			Former Moderator of the General Assembly of the Presbyterian Church in Ireland. Some accounts misspell his surname as "Glynn."
Commerce or Professions	George O'Callaghan-Westropp	2nd meeting			Landowner and local government activist.
Professions (Education)	Sir Andrew Beattie	Both meetings			Commissioner of National Education. Leading Dublin Presbyterian.
Professions (Education)	J. W. R. Campbell	1st meeting			Schoolmaster and Methodist minister.
Professions (Law)	Frederick F. Denning	1st meeting			King's Counsel.
Professions (Law)	Charles Gamble	Both meetings			President of the Law Society of Ireland.
Professions (Engineering)	Sir John Griffith	Did not attend, but took the oath of office		Elected	
Professions (Medicine)	Sir John William Moore	2nd meeting			Physician to the Meath Hospital and medical administrator.
Professions (Medicine)	Sir William Taylor	Both meetings			Former President of the Royal College of Surgeons in Ireland.
Labour	Three Representatives not selected	Boycotted	Seven members		
Bishop (Roman Catholic)	Four Representatives not selected	Did not attend	Four members (Cashel, Ross, Raphoe, and Down & Connor).		
Bishop (Church of Ireland)	Charles D'Arcy	Did not attend	Predecessor (John Crozier) was a member.		Archbishop of Armagh. The see is mainly in Northern Ireland.
Bishop (Church of Ireland)	John Gregg	1st meeting	Predecessor (John Bernard) was a member		Archbishop of Dublin
Peer	Lord Cloncurry	1st meeting			
Peer	Lord de Freyne	Did not attend			
Peer	Earl of Desart	Did not attend	Member		The Irish Times wrote that he was kept from attending by business at the House of Lords in Westminster.
Peer	Earl of Donoughmore	Did not attend			The Irish Times wrote that he was kept from attending by business at the House of Lords in Westminster.
Peer	Earl of Dunraven	Did not attend	Member	Appointed	
Peer	Lord HolmPatrick	Did not attend, but took the oath of office			
Peer	Lord Inchiquin	Did not attend, but took the oath of office			
Peer	Lord Kenmare	Did not attend, but took the oath of office			
Peer	Earl of Mayo	Did not attend	Member	Appointed	
Peer	Earl of Midleton	Did not attend, but took the oath of office	Member		
Peer	Lord Oranmore	Did not attend, but took the oath of office	Member		
Peer	Viscount Powerscourt	Did not attend, but took the oath of office			
Peer	Lord Rathdonnell	1st meeting			
Peer	Marquess of Sligo	1st meeting			
Peer	Earl of Wicklow	Did not attend		Appointed	
Peer and Privy Councillor	Earl of Meath	Did not attend			The Earl of Meath was elected from both the peers' panel and the privy Councillors' panel. The 1920 act and 1921 order made no explicit provision for this, whereas someone elected for multiple Westminster constituencies could only sit for one, creating vacancies in the others.
Privy Councillor	Earl of Granard	Did not attend	Member	Appointed	
Privy Councillor	Sir William Goulding, 1st Bt	Did not attend, but took the oath of office	Member		
Privy Councillor	Walter MacMurrough Kavanagh	2nd meeting	Member		Irish Parliamentary Party MP for County Carlow 1908–10. Previously a Unionist, and chairman of Carlow County Council.
Privy Councillor	Sir Bryan Mahon	Both meetings		Appointed	
Privy Councillor	Earl of Westmeath	Did not attend			
Privy Councillor	Sir Thomas Stafford, Bt	Did not attend	Member		FRCSI; Medical Commissioner of the Local Government Board for Ireland; baronet.
Privy Councillor	Laurence Ambrose Waldron	Resigned before the first meeting			Waldron was nominated on 27 May without his knowledge; on 10 June he formally wrote to the Lord Lieutenant asking "to be relieved of the position".
County councillor	14 Representatives not selected	Boycotted	38 members, one per county and county borough; also several from urban district councils.		

== Supersession ==
In 1922, both the Irish Republic and Southern Ireland were superseded by the Irish Free State. Some of the Southern Ireland senators were subsequently senators in the Free State Seanad (upper house), either appointed by W. T. Cosgrave, President of the Executive Council, or elected by the members of the Dáil (lower house).

== See also ==
- Parliament of Southern Ireland.
