= Literary and Debating Society (University of Galway) =

Irish college society

- Formation: 1846, as the Literary and Scientific Society
- Type: Student debating union

The Literary & Debating Society is a student society at the University of Galway. It was founded as the Literary and Scientific Society in 1846, and incorporated into the then Queen's College, Galway, in 1852. Its objectives include " the holding of weekly debating workshops, literary events and formal floor debates".

== History ==
The Literary and Debating Society of the University of Galway (also known as "Lit & Deb") was founded in the 1840s. At an early meeting of the society, John J. Gibson reputedly outlined the purpose of the society, stating that:

"[the society will] elicit the latent sparks of genius in a few individuals, and send forth men of enlightened views and cultivated tastes [.. and that those men may..] issue forth from this hall, who, vying with the great spirits of the past, shall illumine the future"

During the 1960s, tensions began to develop between the society and the college authorities. In 1960, a debate on the motion "That the death-knell of Sinn Féin has sounded", due to be chaired by Owen Sheehy-Skeffington, was banned by the college authorities, leading to questions in Dáil Éireann. In 1964, during the auditorship of Michael J. O’Connor, the society was suspended from the college following an incident involving a poster. The Lit & Deb found refuge during this suspension with the Dominican Nuns at Taylor's Hill, and held several debates in the Rosary Hall of their school there.

The society soon returned to the college and resumed its meetings in the Greek Hall. The auditor's chain of office was introduced in 1965, under the auditorship of Michael D. Higgins.

== President's Medal ==
The President's Medal is the society's highest accolade. Originally it was an award given to members who excelled in the field of oratory however it fell out of use in the 1950s. In recent times, the committee has resurrected the award and it is now an accolade that recognises the achievements of those outside the society, who excel in particular field. Among the recipients of the award are; Roddy Doyle, Ardal O'Hanlon, Patrick McCabe, Prof. Noam Chomsky, US Senator Mike Gravel, Congressman Bruce Morrison, Desmond Tutu, Nobel Prize winner Prof. Edmund Phelps and former Taoiseach Bertie Ahern. Bertie Ahern was presented with the President's Medal in his hotel after the event on campus had to be abandoned because of a demonstrations by students.

In 2025, Michael D. Higgins, then-President of Ireland, was named president of the society. He was presented with the honorary award in Áras an Uachtaráin by members of the society's committee.

== Activities ==
The society has a strong involvement in external debating, with several winners of the Irish Times Debating Competition and the World University Debating Championship among its alumni.

The society has also hosted forums with political figures. In October 2025, they hosted a question-and-answer forum with Catherine Connolly ahead of the 2025 Irish presidential election. The event was disrupted on several occasions by members of the Burke family..

The Lit & Deb traditionally publishes two magazines. "U.C.G.", the college annual, was founded as "Q.C.G." in 1902, and had responsibility for its publication entrusted to the society in 1914. Criterion, a literary magazine which was founded by the college's now defunct Arts Society in the 1950s, was revived by the Lit & Deb during the 2001-2002 session and later during the 2025-26 session.

The Lit & Deb also has a connection with schools debating, and hosts the West of Ireland section of the All-Ireland Schools Debating Competition. It also runs its own Model United Nations at the University of Galway. Named UGMUN, the society hosts a secondary schools and a university students edition in the second semester of the academic year.

== Notable auditors and vice-auditors ==
- 1974-1975 Patsy McGarry (Arts)
- 1964-1965 Michael D. Higgins (Arts)
- 1963-1964 Michael D. Higgins (Arts)
- 1960-1961 Pádraig MacKernan (Arts)
- 1931-1932 Gerard Anthony Hayes-McCoy (Arts)
- 1928-1929 Martin J. Newell (Science)
- 1923-1924 Patrick J. Lenihan (Arts)
- 1893-1894 John Guy Rutledge (Law)
- 1873-1874 John Gordon (Law)
- 1867-1868 Thomas Power O'Connor (Literary Division, Arts)
- 1866-1867 Michael Francis Ward (Medicine)
- 1864-1865 Frank Hugh O'Donnell (Literary Division, Arts)
- 1863-1864 Antony MacDonnell (Arts)
- 1862-1863 John Atkinson (Science Division, Arts)
- 1861-1862 John Monroe (Law)

== See also ==
- UCC Philosophical Society
- College Historical Society (Trinity College, Dublin)
- University Philosophical Society (Trinity College, Dublin)
- Literary and Historical Society, University College Dublin
- Literary and Debating Society (Maynooth University)
- List of college literary societies
