= J. W. R. Campbell =

Joseph William Robert Campbell (1853–1935) was an Irish Methodist minister and schoolteacher. He was born in Clough, near Newtownbutler, County Fermanagh. He graduated from Queen's College, Belfast in 1875 with a second-class honours degree in natural science, and later gained an M.A. He entered ministry in 1876. He taught at Methodist College Belfast, and was president there from 1908 to 1920. In 1891 he was elected a member of the Royal Society of Antiquaries of Ireland. He was secretary of the Irish Methodists' "Home Mission". In 1900 he represented the Irish church at the British Methodist Connexion. In 1899, he was one of five treasurers of the Irish Methodists' Twentieth Century Fund. The Methodist Church in Ireland Act 1915 appointed him one of 36 trustees of the church. He was a Commissioner of Education in Ireland and Dean of Residences at Queen's University, Belfast. He was a member of the short-lived Senate of Southern Ireland of 1921–22. He married Elizabeth in 1880/1; they had eight children.

== Sources ==
- Minutes of Several Conversations at the 157th Yearly Conference of the People Called Methodists. Methodist Church of Great Britain. 1900.
- Cole, Richard Lee; Crookshank, Charles Henry (1960). One Methodist Church. Irish Methodist Publishing Company.
- Cooney, Dudley Levistone (December 2001). The Methodists in Ireland: a short history. Columba Press. ISBN 978-1-85607-335-6.
