= Charles Gamble =

Anglo-Irish lawyer

Charles George Gamble (1868 – 9 February 1934) was an Anglo-Irish lawyer. He was a member of the short-lived Senate of Southern Ireland.

== Life ==
Gamble was the eldest son of Major George Francis Gamble and Florence Johnston. He was educated in law at Trinity College Dublin and became a solicitor and partner in the firm of Carruthers & Gamble of Fleet Street, Dublin. He was a Justice of the Peace for County Dublin.

He was on the standing committee of the Representative Church Body of the Church of Ireland and was elected President of the Law Society of Ireland in 1920.

In 1921, Gamble was appointed to the Senate of Southern Ireland; he attended both of the two meetings of the house before its dissolution.

== Writing ==
He was the author of Solicitors in Ireland 1607-1921 (published in 1921).
