= Deirdre Murphy (judge) =

Irish barrister, High Court judge 2014-2023

Judge of the High Court
- In office 3 April 2014 – 2 March 2023
- Nominated by: Government of Ireland
- Appointed by: Michael D. Higgins

Personal details
- Born: 1953 (age 72–73)
- Education: St Patrick's College, Maynooth; Trinity College Dublin; King's Inns

Deirdre Murphy (born 1953) is a retired Irish judge who served as a Judge of the High Court from 2014 to 2023.

== Early life ==
She was educated at St Patrick's College, Maynooth and Trinity College Dublin. She was the winner of the Irish Times Debate in 1976. She subsequently attended the King's Inns.

== Legal career ==
She became a barrister in 1979 and a senior counsel in 1999.

Her practice at the bar included acting for the defence and prosecuting on behalf of the Director of Public Prosecutions in criminal trials. She also practiced in the areas of constitutional law and judicial review. She represented the applicant in C(C) v Ireland who was successful in the Supreme Court in declaring part of the Criminal Law Amendment Act 1935 unconstitutional. The Act created strict liability with no defence of honest mistake to unlawful carnal knowledge. The outcome of the case led to the immediate introduction of two new offences to replace the unconstitutional section.

Her work for the state included serving on the legal team for the Cloyne Report between 2009 and 2010 and prosecuting actions in the Special Criminal Court.

She has been a long time advocate of the model litigant (MLO).

== Judicial career ==
Murphy was appointed to the High Court in April 2014. She currently serves on the Superior Courts Rules Committee.

She has heard cases including those involving aspects of criminal law, judicial review, company law, employment law, and repossessions. She regularly presides over homicide and sexual offences cases.

In April 2020, Murphy was the presiding judge in a for mention hearing of a judicial review case taken by John Waters and Gemma O'Doherty against legislation enacted in response to the COVID-19 pandemic. She dismissed an application by the plaintiffs to permit some of the "up to 100 people" who had gathered inside the Four Courts to enter the hearing on account of social distancing measures.

She retired in March 2023.
