= David McKean =

David McKean may refer to:

- David McKean (diplomat), U.S. diplomat
- Dave McKean (born 1963), English artist and graphic designer
