= Rory Brady =

Irish barrister and Attorney General

Attorney General of Ireland
- In office 7 June 2002 – 14 June 2007
- Taoiseach: Bertie Ahern
- Preceded by: Michael McDowell
- Succeeded by: Paul Gallagher

Personal details
- Born: 20 August 1957 Dublin, Ireland
- Died: 19 July 2010 (aged 52) Dublin, Ireland
- Party: Fianna Fáil
- Spouse(s): Siobhán Brady (m. 1991; d. 2010)
- Children: 2
- Education: University College Dublin

Rory Brady (20 August 1957 – 19 July 2010) was an Irish barrister who served as the Attorney General of Ireland from 2002 to 2007. He served as a Member of the Council of State, and was a mediator on the Permanent Court of Arbitration in The Hague.

He was visiting fellow at Harvard University in the United States, and was considered a candidate for the Supreme Court of Ireland.

== Early life ==
Brady was born on 20 August 1957. He sat his Leaving Certificate at Synge Street CBS in 1975. He studied law at University College Dublin and received a Bachelor of Civil Law Degree in 1978. Brady was a tutor in Business Law in the Faculty of Commerce at University College Dublin.

== Career ==
Brady was called to the Irish bar from King's Inns in 1979 and to the English bar from Middle Temple in 1986. He was made a senior counsel in 1996 and was chairman of the Bar Council of Ireland from October 2000 until June 2002. He held the view that the Personal Injuries Assessment Board was a "fatally flawed project". He was a member of several statutory bodies within Ireland, including the Courts Service Board (October 2000 to June 2002); the Censorship of Publications Board (which he chaired from December 2001 to June 2002); and the Garda Síochána Complaints Board (from April 2002 to June 2002).

After the 2002 general election he was nominated by Taoiseach, Bertie Ahern, to be Attorney General for the Fianna Fáil-led coalition. As such he was plaintiff in the 2005–6 case of Indonesian-born Tristan Dowse, an Irish citizen via an international adoption which had been disrupted. In January 2006, he told the Health Service Executive to repay €48 million in alleged illegal fees it received from nursing home residents. He was embroiled in the "Mr A" case which unexpectedly overturned the state's age-of-consent law, but an official report blamed a subordinate for not notifying him in advance of the hearing. He resigned as Attorney General in 2007, in what was considered a surprise move, becoming a barrister again, and receiving a golden parachute package of what was reported to be either €87,000 or more than €200,000.

Brady was Chairperson of the Irish Takeover Panel from April 2008 until his death.

Brady died in July 2010, after two years of illness and was survived by his wife and two daughters. Taoiseach Brian Cowen called him one of the "finest and most able barristers of his time", while Bertie Ahern said he was "a great Dubliner who had a strong affinity with his native city" and that he was his "closest and most trusted colleague at the cabinet table. He was never anything less than brilliant". Ahern had been assisted by Brady in a defamation case. Fine Gael's Charles Flanagan stated that Brady had served "with distinction". Hundreds of people, including politicians, attended his removal, while his funeral was also well attended. His interment was in Mount Jerome Cemetery.

Legal offices
Preceded by Michael McDowell	Attorney General of Ireland; 2002–2007	Succeeded by Paul Gallagaher
