= Kidnapping of Kevin Lunney =

2019 kidnapping

On 17 September 2019, Kevin Lunney, chief operating officer of Quinn Industrial Holdings (QIH), was abducted from his home near Derrylin in the south of County Fermanagh, beaten, and left near Drumcoghill in County Cavan.

== Abduction ==
On the 17 September 2019, Kevin Lunney drove into the laneway leading to his home, just off the Stragowna Road on the northern outskirts of Derrylin, and noticed a white car ahead of him, which quickly reversed into his car. He locked the doors, but two men smashed the windows and dragged him out. A third man threatened him with a Stanley knife, telling him to get into the boot of a black Audi. The attackers then set Lunneys' car and the white car on fire.

Lunney managed to unlock the boot and tried to escape but was beaten and thrown back into the car.

He was then driven across the border to County Cavan to a place he described as "an old farmyard space" and taken inside a horsebox. The man with the knife said, "You know why you're here. It's about QIH and you're going to resign", to which Kevin Lunney said "Yes".

The man with the knife then ran the knife under each of Lunneys' nails, then the gang poured bleach over his hands and rubbed them roughly with a rag. They then cut his clothes off, leaving deep cuts, poured bleach on the cuts and rubbed them roughly with a rag. Kevin Lunney thought he was screaming, but didn't remember.

The gang told Lunney they had watched him, his family and the other directors and if the directors did not resign the gang would come after them.

The man with the knife also cut Lunneys' face five or six times on each side of his face and cut the letters "QIH" into Lunneys' chest. His leg was hit with a short fencepost or baseball bat - he heard it break. His leg was hit a second time, leaving it broken in two places.

The gang said "We have to rough you up, we have to mark you, we have to make sure you remember."

He was dumped on the side of a road in County Cavan. He feared he was going to die as he was cold, in excruciating pain and losing blood.

He was found by a man driving a tractor who saw him on the side of the road around 21:00 IST and called the Gardaí.

== Reactions ==
Seán Quinn has condemned the violence. In an interview with Channel 4 News Seán Quinn said that he no longer wanted to regain control of his former businesses.

Father Oliver O'Reilly, the parish priest of Ballyconnell in County Cavan, condemned the attack, said that a mafia-style campaign has shrouded the community in fear.

In November 2019 it emerged that Seán Quinn had written a letter to senior figures in the Vatican as well as the Papal Nuncio to Ireland Jude Thaddeus Okolo to complain about a homily by Father O'Reilly. In the letter, Mr. Quinn denied having any "hand, act or part" in the attack on Kevin Lunney and that his family had been "frightened and intimidated by being falsely accused of complicity in the attack from the altar in public, by my own priest". The homily did not name anybody but referred to a "paymaster or paymasters" which Quinn wrote is "clear and false reference" to him. The letter was also sent to Father O'Reilly and to Monsignor Liam Kelly, who administers the Kilmore diocese. Mr. Quinn met the Monsignor of the Diocese of Kilmore and also called to Father O'Reillys' home to discuss the matter. Following Quinn's complaint to the Vatican, the Association of Catholic Priests praised Father O'Reilly for his "very brave" stance.

== Police investigations ==
Members of both the Garda Síochána and PSNI are investigating the attack.

In November 2019, Cyril McGuinness, chief suspect in the kidnapping, died in a police raid on his home in Buxton, Derbyshire. The cause of death was reported to be a heart attack and the death is being investigated by Independent Office for Police Conduct.

=== Raids and arrests ===
On 8 November 2019 Cyril McGuinness died after taking ill during a police raid on a house in Buxton, Derbyshire. He was a known criminal and smuggler. The cause of death was reported to be a heart attack and the death is being investigated by the Independent Office for Police Conduct.

On the morning of 14 November 2019 a woman, her son and an unrelated male were arrested in relation to the kidnap. The woman was held under section 30 of the Offences against the State Acts 1939 while the men were detained under the Criminal Justice Act 2007. The mother and son are thought to be related to someone involved in the kidnapping and the other man is thought to have supplied a vehicle. They were being held in Garda stations in Kells, Cavan and Monaghan. They were released and a file sent to the DPP

On the morning of 26 November 2019 four men appeared in district court in Virginia, County Cavan and were charged with the assault and false imprisonment of Kevin Lunney. They were Luke O'Reilly of Kilcogy, County Cavan, Alan O'Brien and Darren Redmond - both of East Wall, Dublin and a fourth man was unable to be named for legal reasons. Luke O'Reilly and the fourth man were remanded to custody. Bail applications were made on behalf of Alan O’Brien and Darren Redmond - Gardaí objected on several grounds including those relating to evidence and witness intimidation. Judge Denis McLoughlin refused both applications and all four were remanded to Castlerea Prison.

On 28 April 2020 the High Court granted bail to Luke O'Reilly and Darren Richmond against Garda objections. The two men had been served with books of evidence on 26 March 2020 and they appeared on video link from Portlaoise Prison. The judge said that the crime they were charged with constituted vicious cruel and abhorrent behaviour but the prosecution had just failed to provide enough evidence to meet the standard for the court to refuse bail. The judge granted bail, but emphasised that stringent conditions were attached.

O'Reilly was required to enter his own bond of €75,000 with a cash bond of €10,000 and that he should not attempt to dissipate or lessen the value of property owned by him. He is also to surrender his passport and not apply for any duplicate passport or travel documents. He must reside at an alternative address in County Westmeath, sign on at Athlone Garda Station twice daily, obey a curfew between 8am and 8pm, provide his mobile phone number to Gardaí, keep the phone charged at all times and not come within 10 km of Kevin Lunny's home or place of business. He was also not to have any contact with Kevin Lunney or any other prosecution witness, not leave the jurisdiction or travel to Northern Ireland.

Redmond was granted bail on his own bond of €3,000 and two independent sureties of €10,000. He must reside at his address in East Wall, Dublin and sign on at Store Street Garda station twice daily and obey a curfew. The condition regarding dissipation of assets do not apply to him.

The accused must make no contact between themselves and if it was necessary for them to be in contact they must contact Gardaí. The requirement to sign on in Garda stations is suspended during the COVID-19 restrictions.

The case is in for mention at the Special Criminal Court on 10 June 2020.

=== Trial ===
On 10 June 2020 the date for the trial of the four men was set to begin on 21 January 2021 in the Special Criminal Court. Prosecution told the judge that the case involves 50,000 documents. O'Reilly and Redmond had their bail extended until January while O'Brien and the man who cannot be named were remanded in custody.

On 14 August the man who cannot be named brought a High Court challenge against the Special Criminal Court's jurisdiction to hear his trial. He claims that the DPP's decision that he should not be tried before a jury is a significant curtailment of his constitutional rights.

In December 2020 the court dismissed an attempt to halt the trial over a ruling from the Court of Justice of the European Union on data retention.

On 5 January 2021 the trial was postponed to 1 February because of a spike in the number of cases of COVID-19.

On 21 May 2021 the Special Criminal Court heard the trial would proceed on 31 May. The delay had been caused by both COVID-19 and the number of witnesses in the case. The court heard that 'YZ', the unnamed man, had a legal issue that had now been disposed of. The trial is expected to last 12 weeks.

On 2 June 2021 the court ruled that it had jurisdiction to hear the trial. The man known as 'YZ' cannot be named because he is to face trial on unrelated matters.

==== Verdicts ====
On 8 November 2021 the court began delivering verdicts. The man known as 'YZ' was found guilty of falsely imprisoning and intentionally causing harm to Kevin Lunney. The judge said that he was satisfied that 'YZ' was the driver of the black Audi used in the kidnapping and that he had inflicted most of the serious injuries on Mr. Lunney. Alan O'Brien and Darren Redmond were also found guilty on the same charges. Luke O'Reilly was acquitted as there was a reasonable doubt that he knew what was planned.

Of those found guilty, YZ has 180 previous convictions, including one for impeding the apprehension and prosecuting of a person in a murder. Alan O'Brien had 40 previous convictions, the earliest at the age of 14. The convictions include an attack on an elderly man in Tallaght in which €12,000 was stolen. His defence counsel said that the pattern of offences was linked to alcohol and drug addiction but his client had pleaded not guilty and doesn't accept the court verdict. Darren Redmond had two previous convictions and recently found his older brother dead after a heart attack.

Sentencing of the convicted is scheduled for 20 December 2021.

==== Victim impact statement ====
On 22 November 2021 Kevin Lunney issued a victim impact statement. The attack upon him was the culmination of an intimidation campaign. He said that he didn't know why the three found guilty had attacked him - he didn't know them nor they him. He was "saddened at a human level" that the three guilty men had brought ruin on themselves and their families, but "the journey to full accountability is not complete". The campaign against the business was extremely difficult and caused fear in the broader community. He said a march by his co-workers after the attack was "affirming" and he would be "forever grateful" for it. He described his family as his "rock and refuge" and that the physical and mental scars of the attack would remain with them for the rest of their lives. He said "what they have had to endure is greater torment".

==== Sentences ====
On 20 December 2021 sentences were handed down. The man known as YZ was sentenced to 30 years, Alan O'Brien received a 25 year sentence and Darren Redmond received an 18 year sentence with the final three years suspended. Mr Justice Tony Hunt handed down the sentences. He said that the only reason he had not passed a life sentence on any of them was that it should be reserved for those who finance or benefit from their crimes.

== Lifting of anonymity order ==
On 18 January 2022 the High Court lifted an order preserving the anonymity of one of the three men convicted. He is Alan Harte of East Wall. When the Special Criminal Court had sentenced him, Mr Justice Tony Hunt had described him as the 'ringleader' and said he had inflicted most of the injuries on Kevin Lunney.

The order was lifted by Mr Justice Charles Meehan. He dismissed an application by Harte's lawyers to extend his anonymity. The order had been put in place when Harte was first charged with the offences against Kevin Lunney and was extended in December 2021. It had been granted because he was to go on trial in the Central Criminal Court for an unrelated charge of murder. That trial collapsed and the charge against him was dismissed after the DPP entered a nolle prosequi. The order was continued after his conviction by the SCC as he has other, unrelated, criminal matters before the courts.

Mr Justice Meehan cited article 34 of the Irish constitution, which states that justice must be done in public, as there were "no grounds" to continue the order.

== Further security concerns ==
In June 2022 Gardaí launched a major security operation around Kevin Lunney and fellow directors of former Quinn companies after receiving credible reports of attacks being planned against them.
