= Kieran Healy =

Irish sociologist

Kieran Healy is an Irish sociologist, a professor of sociology at Duke University, a member of the Kenan Institute for Ethics at Duke, and a regular visitor to the Research School in Social Science (RSSS) at the Australian National University. He earned his PhD in sociology from Princeton University, having begun his studies at University College Cork, in Ireland. His research interests include the social basis of self-interest and altruism, the organization of exchange in human goods (like blood, organs, eggs and genetic material), and the role of volunteering in the open source software movement. In 2002, he received the American Sociological Association's Dissertation Award for "Exchange in Blood and Organs."

Healy was involved in debating while at UCC and won the Irish Times National Debating competition in 1993. He was also a member of the UCC Philosophical Society.

He is a member of the Crooked Timber and orgtheory.net group blogs.

== Selected publications ==
- Altruism as an organizational problem: The case of organ procurement American Sociological Review , 69:387-404, 2004, PDF
- Digital technology and cultural goods Journal of Political Philosophy, 10(4):478-500, 2002, PDF
- Last Best Gifts: Altruism and the Market for Human Blood and Organs. University of Chicago Press (Chicago, 2006). Description.
- Data Visualization: A Practical Introduction. Princeton University Press (2018) Description. ISBN 978-0691181622
- Fuck Nuance Sociological Theory, 35(2):118-127, 2017, PDF
