= Michael Peart (judge) =

Irish judge

Judge of the Court of Appeal
- In office 24 October 2014 – 25 October 2019
- Nominated by: Government of Ireland
- Appointed by: Michael D. Higgins

Judge of the High Court
- In office 21 June 2002 – 24 October 2014
- Nominated by: Government of Ireland
- Appointed by: Mary McAleese

Personal details
- Born: Sandymount, Dublin, Ireland
- Education: University College Dublin; Law Society of Ireland

Michael Peart is a retired Irish judge who served as a Judge of the Court of Appeal from 2014 to 2019 and a Judge of the High Court from 2002 to 2014.

== Early life ==
Peart attended Glenstal Abbey and obtained a BCL degree from University College Dublin. Following his education at the Law Society of Ireland, he was admitted as a solicitor in 1970. He worked at Pearts Solicitors with a speciality in litigation. He represented Bula Mines in litigation against Tara Mine which frequently reached the Supreme Court of Ireland. He is a bencher of the King's Inns.

== Judicial career ==
He was appointed a High Court judge in 2002. He was the first Solicitor appointed to the High Court. He presided over cases in the High Court involving criminal law, judicial review, personal injuries, immigration law and commercial law.

Peart became a Judge of the Court of Appeal in October 2014 upon its establishment. In the Court of Appeal, he delivered judgments on appeals involving defamation, judicial review, land law, criminal law, discovery, and professional misconduct. He chaired a committee to reform legal education of solicitors in Ireland through the Law Society of Ireland, which presented its findings in 2018. He retired in October 2019 in advance of his seventieth birthday.
