= University College Dublin Law Society =

Student debating society

- Founded: 1911
- Headquarters: UCD Sutherland School of Law
- Website: www.lawsoc.ie

The UCD Law Society is one of the largest student societies in Europe. Established in 1911 as 'The Legal and Economic Society', as of 2009 it had approximately 4100 members drawn from the various faculties of the university. The society holds weekly house debates, mock trials, moot court competitions and careers events, as well as inviting notable figures to address the society. Individuals who have addressed the society include President of Ireland Michael D. Higgins, former Irish Taoiseach (Prime Minister), Bertie Ahern and President of the European Council Donald Tusk. The society's motto is "Ar son na Córa" (in the pursuit of justice).

== Activities ==
=== House debates ===
As the largest of the two debating unions in University College Dublin, the society gathers once a week to debate topical motions relating to students and other national issues of importance. This is one of the main activities of the society, typically taking place on Tuesday evenings in the Fitzgerald Chamber in the UCD Student Centre. Motions have ranged from the relevance of the Students' Union, to the constitutional protection of women's place in the home and Irish neutrality.

The Law Society organised the first live Irish presidential debate which took place on nominations day 2011. A society debate on the second Lisbon Treaty referendum, on 28 September 2009, saw an attendance of over 1,000 students in O'Reilly Hall, Belfield.

=== Guest speakers and honorary life memberships ===
The Law Society also regularly invites speakers to deliver individual addresses to the society. Guest speakers have included former Minister for Justice, Michael McDowell in October 2009 and the former lead prosecutor of Slobodan Milosevic, Sir Geoffrey Nice QC in March 2010. In 2017, the former president of the ECB, Jean-Claude Trichet, received an honorary lifetime membership of the society.

The society awards 'Honorary Life Memberships' to individuals who have contributed significantly to their field. Recipients of Honorary Life Memberships have included actors Patrick J. Adams, Sir Christopher Lee, Martin Sheen, John C. McGinley, Dirk Benedict, Jeremy Irons, David Kelly and Leslie Nielsen, comedians Colin Murphy, Dan Antopolski and Bill Bailey, authors Tucker Max, Jung Chang and Noam Chomsky, political figures Ken Livingstone and Bill Clinton, sportspeople Cristiano Ronaldo, Pauleta, Jimmy White, Brian O’Driscoll and Paul O’Connell, dancer Michael Flatley, supermodel Erin O’Connor and Nobel laureate Seamus Heaney.

== Free speech ==
=== Controversies ===
The society is committed to maintaining a policy of free speech, a policy which it has, on occasion, found difficult to maintain. In 2008, the radical French politician Jean-Marie Le Pen was invited to address the society concerning the federalisation of the European Union. This event was essentially struck down by university authorities after it denounced the move in response to queries from the national media. Many other debates have seen significant protests from left-wing student movements. Their policy of "no TDs on campus" due to perceived government support of university tuition fees has often conflicted with invitations to Fianna Fáil TDs on unrelated debate motions. Protests occurred in 2008 when government minister Éamon Ryan arrived to address the society. and again in 2009 when Bertie Ahern chaired a debate.

In November 2015, Robert O'Neill, the soldier who shot Osama bin Laden, was invited to address the society. The event attracted controversy, and during the week of the event posters and online advertising of the event disappeared without explanation. The morning of the address however, posters appeared promising a 'mystery guest' and depicting the silhouette of a navy seal. Robert O'Neill duly gave his address to approximately 300 students.

== Moot court competitions ==
=== Cecil Lavery Moot Court Competition ===
The Cecil Lavery is a moot court competition named after one of the society's former auditors, a former Attorney General and Supreme Court Judge. Initiated in 2005, the competition is organised in a knockout format and the grand final is held in the UCD Sutherland School of Law in February each year. Some senior members of the Irish judiciary have been invited to adjudicate at previous competitions.

=== Thomas A. Finlay Moot Court Intervarsity ===
The Thomas A. Finlay Moot Court Intervarsity is an international moot court competition named after the former Irish Chief Justice, Thomas A. Finlay. It was founded in 2009.

== Competitive debating ==
The Law Society's record in competitive debating includes a number of wins in international debating competitions and victory in the Mace competition. In 2022, a speaker representing the UCD LawSoc won the individual speaker's award at the Irish Times Debate competition. The society has also sent delegates to the World Universities Debating Championship and the European Universities Debating Championship, including reaching the quarter-finals in both competitions. In 1987 and 2006, UCD hosted the World Universities Debating Championship.

The society also organises competitive debating in Irish secondary schools through the Law Society Schools' Mace and the Leinster Junior Schools Debating Competition.

== History ==
=== Origins ===
The society was founded, in 1911, as the Legal & Economic Society. Early committee members included Thomas Kettle, Conor Maguire, Thomas Arkins and Arthur Cox. The society struggled to maintain its activity during the War of Independence and Civil War.

The society was renamed the Legal Society in 1924 and had a brief resurgence of activity under the auditorship of J.C. Flood. In 1926, however, the society ran into trouble once again.

=== Reformation ===
In 1935, the society was reconstituted as the Law Society, tasked with organising legal debates and representing legal students.

During the 1950s and 1960s, the society began to challenge the Literary & Historical Society for dominance in University debate.

In the 1970s, the society won the Irish Times twice, as well as the Irish Mace, both times with auditor Conor Gearty. During the 1980s and 1990s, the society won the Irish Times twice more. The notorious criminal, Martin Cahill, addressed the society in 1987 and for many years the society held the Guinness World Record for the longest ever continuous debate.

The 1990s saw the society expand its membership base beyond law students; reaching out to the entire campus. Throughout the 1990s and 2000s, the society grew and by 2010, when prior to the awarding of Honorary Life Membership to television presenter Jeremy Kyle, it signed up its 5,000th member for that session. By 2017, the society had reached 5,600 members before winning the Irish Times back-to-back, in 2017 and 2018.

== Administration ==
=== Auditor and committee ===
The Law Society is run by a committee of selected members, each with a specific remit. The committee is chosen by the auditor, who is elected for a single year term by the enrolled membership of the society. The auditor is the head of the committee and responsible for the day-to-day running of the society. At the society's annual general meeting, the results of the auditorial election are declared and the new auditor appointed following the passing over of the chain of office.

=== Patron, president and vice-presidents ===
The roles of patron, president and vice-president roles are largely ceremonial. As of 2024, the patron of the Law Society was Professor Oral Feely, the President of UCD, while the president of the society was the Dean of the School of Law, Professor Laurent Pech. There are a number of vice-presidents, who are almost exclusively all international legal figures and address the society upon their appointment to the position. Notable vice-presidents have included the Chief Justice of Canada, the Hon. Ms Justice Beverly McLachlin PC, Associate Justice of the U.S. Supreme Court, Antonin Scalia, the former President of the U.K. Supreme Court, Lord Phillips of Worth Matravers, Professor Joseph Raz, the former President of the U.K Supreme Court Baroness Hale of Richmond, the first female Chief Justice of England and Wales Baroness Carr of Walton-on-the-Hill and Judge Síofra O'Leary, the first female President of the European Court of Human Rights.
