= Brian Curtin =

Former Irish judge

Brian Curtin (b. 1951/52) is a former barrister and Irish circuit court judge, who was tried for possessing images of child pornography. After the case collapsed, the question of whether Curtin could continue as a judge became the focus of political and legal dispute. An impeachment motion was proposed in the Dáil in 2004 by Minister for Justice, Equality and Law Reform Michael McDowell. Curtin resigned in 2006 on grounds of ill health, and the motion lapsed.

== Early life and career ==
Curtin is the only child of a builder and his wife, who had emigrated from near Tralee in county Kerry to south London where Brian was born and raised, attending St Joseph's Roman Catholic Primary School, Putney Bridge Road, Wandsworth, as well as the Salesian College, in Surrey Lane, Battersea. In the 1970s he attended Trinity College Dublin, and qualified from King's Inns in 1976. As a barrister he worked on the Kerry Babies Tribunal, and developed a high profile in Kerry.

Curtin married Miriam McGillicuddy, a solicitor and later mayor of Tralee. They have one daughter, and separated in c.1998. Curtin was involved in amateur drama, and presented a Sunday morning show on Radio Kerry. He was politically active in Fianna Fáil, and later the Progressive Democrats, for which party stood unsuccessfully for election to Tralee Town Council.

Curtin was appointed to the Garda Complaints Appeals Board in May 2001; to the Refugee Appeals Tribunal in August 2001; and to the circuit court in November 2001. He heard cases on the Southwestern Circuit, encompassing his home county of Kerry.

== Trial and acquittal ==
In May 2002, the Garda Síochána launched Operation Amethyst, a major investigation based on details received from Interpol in August 2001 of Irish credit card transactions made in 1999 to a child-pornography website in Texas. The operation led to numerous arrests and convictions. Detectives executed a search warrant on Curtin's private residence, seized his computer and reported finding 273 pornographic images of children on the hard disk. Curtin was charged in January 2003. Following delays due to the judge's ill-health, the trial took place in April 2004. At the trial, Curtin claimed that the search was illegal because it had taken place outside the limit of the 7-day warrant. The Gardaí claimed that the delay was due to Curtin's extended absence from his home and that when it took place at 2:20pm on 27 May 2002, it was still within the 7-day limit. The trial judge ruled that the search was illegal. As a result, the computer evidence found could not be used. Without that evidence Curtin was found not guilty, the judge declaring that the case was "crystal clear".

== Attempted impeachment ==
There was considerable public outcry in response to the acquittal. Online opinion polls showed little support for his continuing to serve on the bench. Curtin refused a Government request to step down, claiming that under the Constitution of Ireland he could only be removed for "stated misbehaviour". The Irish Times urged him to resign to prevent a constitutional crisis.

In June 2004 Justice Minister McDowell moved an impeachment motion in the Dáil, saying Curtin was "unsuitable to exercise the office of a judge of the Circuit Court". This was only the second judicial "impeachment" motion under the 1937 Constitution — the first, in 1941, had been withdrawn. The Dáil suspended McDowell's motion and established a joint Oireachtas select committee to examine the evidence. This inquiry was challenged by Judge Curtin in the courts. The challenges were unsuccessful and following a Supreme Court ruling in March 2006 upholding the process, the select committee took custody of the computer from the Gardaí and hired experts to examine it. Curtin suggested that malware could have downloaded the pornographic images to his computer without his knowledge. The process took longer than expected but they planned to issue a report to the Oireachtas in late 2006 to facilitate a debate and vote.

In November 2006, Judge Curtin resigned from the judiciary on health grounds, ending the investigation. This occurred days before he was to give evidence in private to the committee, and days after he had completed five years on the bench, the minimum sufficient to qualify for a pension.
