= Maynooth Students' Union =

- Location: North Campus, Maynooth University, Maynooth, County Kildare
- Established: 1977
- Affiliations: Aontas na Mac Léinn in Éirinn
- Website: MSU.ie

Maynooth Students' Union (MSU; Irish: Aontas na Mac Léinn, Mhá Nuad) is the students' union which represents the students of Maynooth University and St. Patrick's Pontifical University, formerly St. Patrick's College, Maynooth.

== History ==
Maynooth Students' Union was formed in 1977, and celebrated its 40th anniversary in 2017.

In December 1981, the union organised a poorly-attended protest outside Leinster House to call on the government to open the higher education grant scheme to clerical students of SPPU, as it was open to secular students who had their degrees taught by SPC, Maynooth and only accredited by the NUI as MU was only established in 1998. They garnered the support of the then-Union of Students in Ireland, now AMLÉ, who had passed a resolution in support of this at their previous annual conference and whose president, Brendan Dorris threatened a student strike. The protest came as part of a 31 million pound supplementary funding vote to the HE sector, including 9 million pounds of effective bailouts due to increases in costs and expected improvements of HE bodies over the year.

It was called Maynooth Students Union until 1997, when it rebranded to National University of Maynooth Students Union, before changing its name in 2014 to its current name of Maynooth Students Union. The original students' union building and bar (on the west of the north campus) was replaced in 1993, shortly after the development of the restaurant and sports building, which was built in 1991. This housed the student's union offices and shop which had been in the Arts faculty block. In 2018, as part of the Maynooth University development plan, proposals for a new student centre were commenced, with completion proposed for 2022. However, in September 2022, Maynooth University announced that construction on the new student centre had been cancelled, citing rising construction costs. This prompted Maynooth Students' Union to engage the student body in an action campaign, known as #WheresMyLevy.

In 2017, former president of the union, Leon Diop took a defamation case against the operators of the Luas in Dublin. Diop stated that, due to their skin colour, he and his brother had been asked to provide ID and to leave a Luas carriage in 2016 when he was MSU president. While the judge found against Diop in 2018, he won a High Court appeal in 2019 in which the court found that defamation had occurred when the pair were asked to leave the carriage after producing valid tickets. Justice Barr found any defamation was only momentary and was corrected and awarded Diop his costs plus 500 euro. The court did not find whether the decision to inspect their tickets amounted, in itself, to racial profiling.

In 2025, Gavin Fanning, a former MSU president, together with Aoife Hynes, a former student senator and part-time officer, reportedly compiled a "dossier", containing alleged incidents of harassment, data breaches, and several failures to accommodate disabilities. The accusations, together with alleged data protection breaches, were reportedly submitted to the Data Protection Commission and the Workplace Relations Commission.

In 2026, the union reportedly changed its name to the dual Irish-English name of "Aontas Mac Léinn Mhá Nuad-Maynooth Students' Union" (AMLMN-MSU).

Between September 2023 and July 2026, the union had six different presidents.

== Affiliations ==
Maynooth Students' Union is a constituent organisation of Aontas na Mac Léinn in Éirinn (formerly known as the Union of Students in Ireland or USI). MSU rejoined USI in 2009 after disaffiliating from it in 2001. In 2013, 2016, and 2019 there were other student body referendums to disaffiliate from the USI, but students voted to remain.

== Societies ==
As of 2024, there were over 100 clubs and societies at Maynooth University. Among the oldest is the Literary & Debating Society, which was founded as part of St. Patrick's College Maynooth in 1795. Debating competitions historically associated with this society include the Maynooth Open (a debating inter-varsity competition open to all university debating societies) and the Aoife Begley competition (an annual secondary schools debating competition run by the Literary & Debating Society).
