= Garrett Sheehan =

Irish judge

Judge of the Court of Appeal
- In office 24 October 2014 – 23 March 2017
- Nominated by: Government of Ireland
- Appointed by: Michael D. Higgins

Judge of the High Court
- In office 5 October 2007 – 24 October 2014
- Nominated by: Government of Ireland
- Appointed by: Mary McAleese

Personal details
- Education: University College Dublin; Law Society of Ireland

Garrett Sheehan is a retired Irish judge who served as a Judge of the Court of Appeal from 2014 to 2017 and a Judge of the High Court from 2007 to 2014.

He was educated at University College Dublin and the Law Society of Ireland. He was enrolled as a solicitor in 1969. He is a bencher of the King's Inns.

He retired from the bench in 2017. On 9 December 2020, he was appointed by President Michael D. Higgins to the position of Chairperson of the Standards in Public Office Commission.
