= Law Society of Ireland =

Irish professional association

- Dlí-Chumann na hÉireann

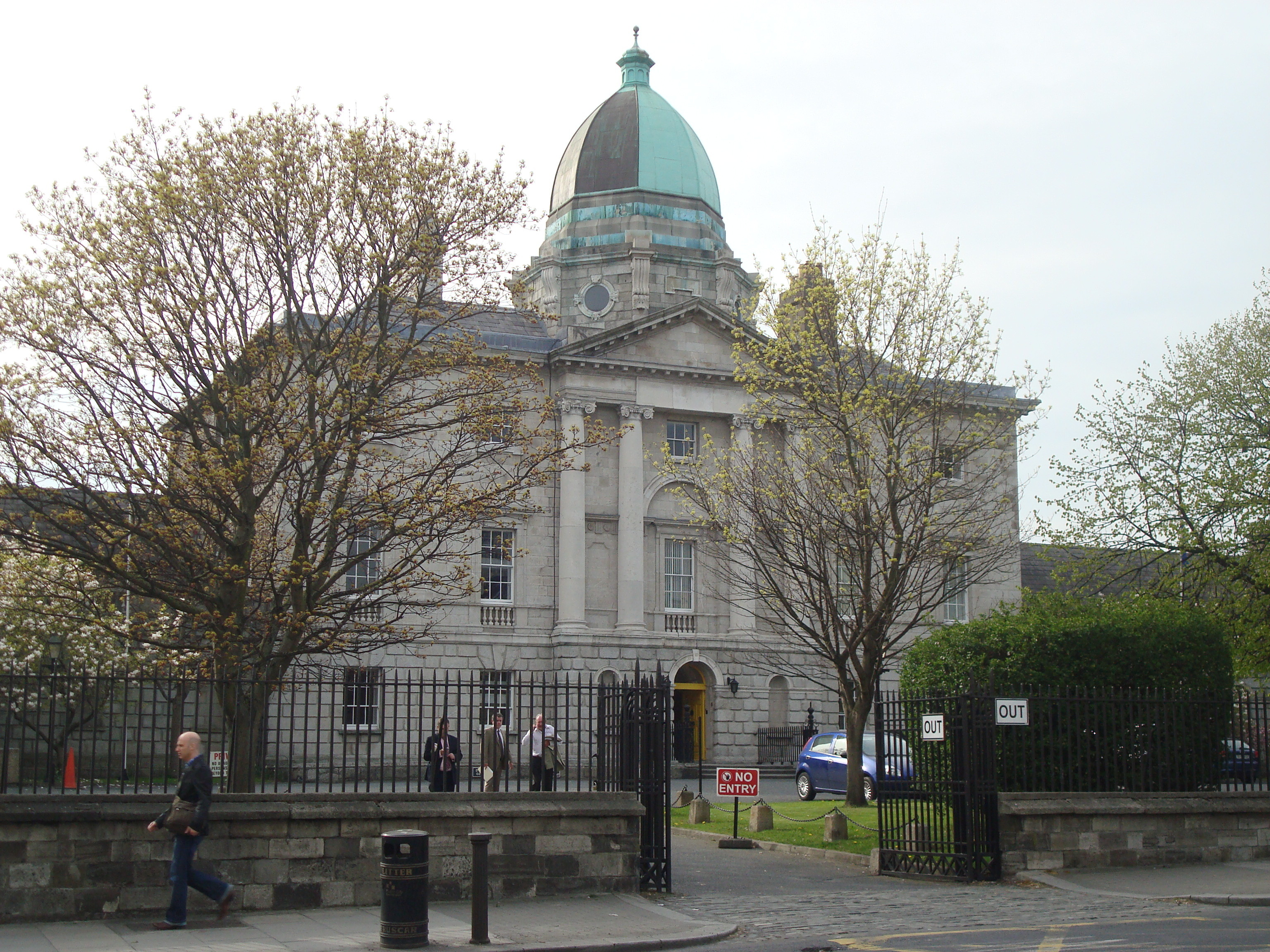
- Blackhall Place, Dublin
- Predecessor: Society of Attorneys and Solicitors of Ireland
- Formation: 24 June 1830; 196 years ago
- Type: Professional association
- Legal status: Chartered
- Purpose: Educational, representative and regulatory
- Professional title: Solicitor
- Headquarters: Blackhall Place
- Location: Dublin, Ireland
- Coordinates: 53.348754°N 6.282724°W
- Region served: Ireland
- Members: 11,166 (2020)
- President: Eamon Harrington
- Junior Vice President: Martin G Lawlor
- Director General: Mark Garrett
- Main organ: Council
- Budget: €31.2 million (2020)
- Funding: Professional and educational fees
- Staff: 146 (2020)
- Students: 921 (Professional Practice Courses) (2020)
- Website: www.lawsociety.ie

The Law Society of Ireland (Irish: Dlí-Chumann na hÉireann) is a professional body established on 24 June 1830 and is the educational, representative and regulatory body of the solicitors' profession in Ireland. As of 2022, the Law Society had 12,392 solicitor members and an annual turnover of over €32m. It is headquartered in Dublin, Ireland's capital city.

Under the Solicitors Acts 1954 to 2015, the Law Society exercises functions in relation to the education, admission, enrolment, discipline and regulation of the solicitors' profession. It is the professional body for its solicitor members, to whom it also provides services and support.

== Relationship with the Law Society of Northern Ireland ==
Prior to the partition of Ireland, solicitors in what became Northern Ireland were regulated by the Law Society of Ireland. They are now regulated by the Law Society of Northern Ireland.

Five seats on the Council of the Law Society of Ireland are reserved for members of the Council of the Law Society of Northern Ireland.

The Law Society of Ireland collaborates with the Law Society of Northern Ireland on various initiatives, including the Irish Rule of Law International and the Solicitors' Benevolent Association.

Republic of Ireland-qualified solicitors are entitled to apply to the Law Society of Northern Ireland to be admitted to the Roll of Solicitors in Northern Ireland without taking any further examinations. Northern Ireland-qualified solicitors have reciprocal eligibility.

== History ==
The Law Society of Ireland was established on 24 June 1830 with premises at Inns Quay, Dublin. In November 1830, the committee of the Society submitted a memorial to the benchers as to the ‘necessity and propriety’ of erecting chambers for the use of solicitors with the funds that solicitors had been levied to pay to King's Inns over the years. The committee requested that the hall and chambers for the use of solicitors should be erected away from the King's Inns, and apartments in the Four Courts were allotted by the King's Inns to solicitors in May 1841. However, the adequacy of that accommodation at the Four Courts was to be a bone of contention between the Society and the benchers for 30 years. The first president, Josiah Dunn, was elected in 1842.

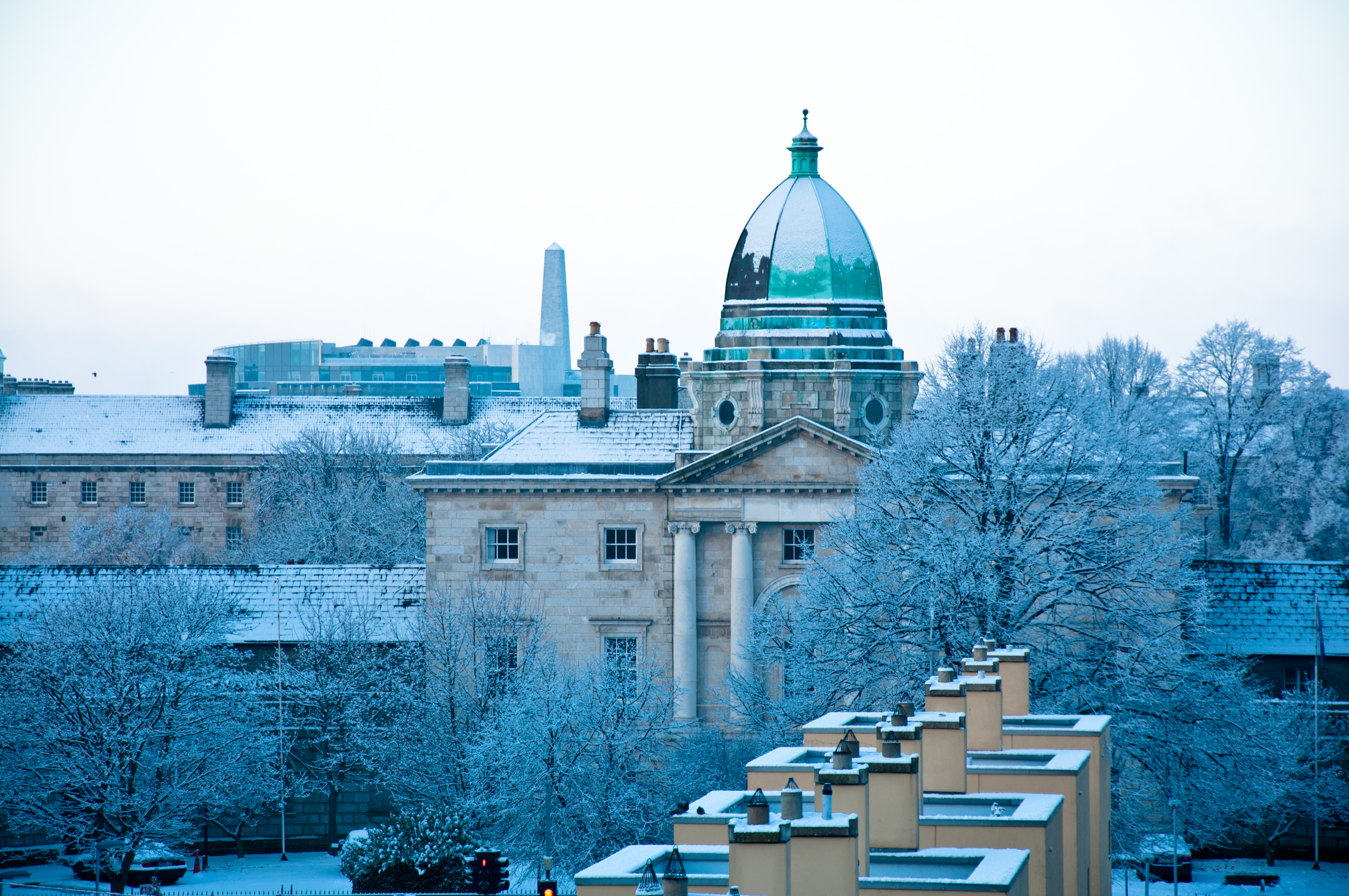
Law Society building after a snowstorm. November 2010

The Law Society was incorporated by royal charter obtained from Queen Victoria on 5 April 1852 under the name of "the Incorporated Society of Attorneys and Solicitors of Ireland". The charter referred to founding "an institution for facilitating the acquisition of legal knowledge", and for the better and more convenient discharging of professional duties of attorneys and solicitors.

The principal events with which the Law Society was concerned on behalf of solicitors in the second half of the 19th century were the inauguration of a scheme for the education of apprentices, the independence of the solicitors’ profession from the King's Inns, and the achievement of an increasing degree of self-government and recognition of its position as the representative and regulatory body for solicitors in Ireland.

In accordance with the Supreme Court of Judicature Act (Ireland) 1877, anyone admitted as solicitor or attorney was, from then on, to be referred to as solicitor of the Court of Judicature (although the title of attorney lives on in the designation of the chief law officer of the State as the Attorney General). As a consequence, the Law Society was granted a supplemental charter, again by Queen Victoria, on 14 December 1888 under which the Law Society was styled the "Incorporated Law Society of Ireland".

In 1888, the constitution of the Council of the Society was changed by supplemental charter, which provided that the Northern Law Society and Southern Law Association would each be entitled to appoint members to the Council of the Law Society of Ireland.

The legal functions of the Law Society were substantially increased by the Solicitors (Ireland) Act 1898, which transferred control of education and important disciplinary functions from the direct supervision of the judges to that of the Society.

Following the partition of Ireland, the separate Law Society of Northern Ireland was established on 10 July 1922.

In 1960, provision was made for the appointment to the Council of three members of the Dublin Solicitors’ Bar Association Council.

By the middle of the 1960s, the solicitors’ buildings at the Four Courts were proving inadequate for the expanding activities of the Society and outside premises were used for lectures for students. A special committee recommended the purchase of the premises of King's Hospital, Blackhall Place, described by renowned architectural historian, Maurice Craig, as "one of the most beautiful and, in its way, original" of Dublin's major buildings. Council member of the Law Society, Peter Prentice, proposed a motion at a special meeting of the Council on 3 July 1968 (seconded by John Jermyn) that the Society purchase the King's Hospital for the sum of IR£105,000. The motion was carried unanimously and a contract was subsequently executed. The Taoiseach Jack Lynch performed the official opening ceremony of the new headquarters on Wednesday 14 June 1978.

In 1994, the Law Society's name was changed once more, this time the word "Incorporated" (in Irish: "Corpraithe") being omitted from its title.

The Society pressed for many years for a change in the law so as to permit the appointment of solicitors in the Circuit Court and the High Court. The Courts and Court Officers Act 1995 allowed for the appointment of solicitors as judges to the Circuit Court. In July 1996, the government announced the appointment of solicitors John F Buckley, Frank O’Donnell and Michael White as judges of the Circuit Court – the first such appointments in the history of the State. The Courts and Court Officers Act 2002 provided that a person shall be qualified for appointment as a judge of the Supreme Court and the High Court by being, a practising barrister or practising solicitor of not less than 12 years’ standing. Shortly after its enactment, Michael Peart became the first practising solicitor to be appointed a judge of the High Court. Mr. Justice Peart is now a judge of the Court of Appeal as is Mr. Justice Garrett Sheehan. Current High Court judges include solicitors Max Barrett, Donald Binchy and Robert Eagar.

The current statutory basis for the Law Society is set out in the Solicitors Acts 1954-2002.

== Functions ==
The Law Society has a range of statutory and non-statutory functions. Its statutory functions under the Solicitors Acts relate to the education and admission of persons to the profession; regulatory and disciplinary matters and the protection of solicitors' clients. The Law Society's non-statutory functions relate to the representation and provision of services to its members and protecting the public interest.

== Education ==
A new Law School, built on premises adjoining the existing Blackhall Place headquarters, was officially opened by President Mary McAleese on 2 October 2000. The new library at Blackhall Place was also opened by President McAleese on the same day. The Society offers a number of Diplomas in Law, CPD Training and, in partnership with Northumbria University, two Masters programmes, and a Professional Doctorate in Law.

== Administration ==
The governing body of the Law Society is its Council. It comprises both elected and nominated members, all of whom are solicitors. Over the years the Council has established a range of committees to which it delegates certain of its statutory functions.

The Council may comprise not more than 48 persons. Of its membership, between 21 and 31 must be elected from among the Law Society's members. A delegate from each of the four provinces of Ireland must also be chosen. Up to five extraordinary members may be appointed from each of the Councils of the Southern Law Association and the Law Society of Northern Ireland while three may be appointed from the Council of the Dublin Solicitors' Bar Association.

As of 2009, the Law Society's Council comprised forty-eight members, being the maximum permitted. Annually they select one of their number as president. That term of office runs from early November to early November of the following year.

=== List of presidents ===
- 1842–1848 Josias Dunn
- 1848–1860 William Goddard
- 1860–1876 Sir Richard J. T. Orpen
- 1876 Edward Reeves
- 1876/77 William Roche
- 1877/78 Sir William Findlater
- 1878/79 William Read
- 1879/80 Henry A. Dillon
- 1880/81 John H. Nunn
- 1881/82 Henry J. P. West
- 1882/83 Henry T. Dix
- 1883/84 William D'Alton
- 1884/85 John Galloway
- 1885/86 Henry L. Keily
- 1886/87 Sir Patrick Maxwell
- 1887/88 Richard S. Reeves
- 1888/89 John MacSheehy
- 1889/90 W. Burroughs Stanley
- 1890/91 Francis R. M. Crozier
- 1891/92 Thomas C. Franks
- 1892/93 Edward Fitgerald
- 1893/94 John Alexander French
- 1894/95 Trevor T. L. Overend
- 1895/96 Sir William Fry
- 1896/97 Sir William Findlater
- 1897/98 William Henry Dunne
- 1898/99 Hugh Stuart Moore
- 1899/1900 Richard S. Reeves
- 1900/01 James Goff and Sir George Roche
- 1901/02 Charles A. Stanuell
- 1902/03 Sir Augustine F. Baker
- 1903/04 Robert Keating Clay and Edward D. MacLaughlin
- 1904/05 Edward D. MacLaughlin
- 1905/06 Sir John P. Lynch
- 1906/07 William S. Heyes
- 1907/08 George H. Lyster
- 1908/09 William J. Shannon
- 1909/10 Richard A. MacNamara
- 1910/11 Frederick Walsingham Meredith
- 1911/12 Gerald Byrne
- 1912/13 James Henry
- 1913/14 Henry J. Sinnott
- 1914/15 Arthur E. Bradley
- 1915/16 Charles St George Orpen
- 1916/17 John W. Richards
- 1917/18 William V. Seddall
- 1918/19 Richard Blair White
- 1919/20 Robert G. Warren
- 1920/21 Charles G. Gamble
- 1921/22 Patrick J. Brady
- 1922/23 Joseph E. MacDermott
- 1923/24 James Moore
- 1924/25 Arthur H. S. Orpen
- 1925/26 Thomas G. Quirke
- 1926/27 William T. Sheridan
- 1927/28 Basil Thompson
- 1928/29 Edward H. Burne
- 1929/30 Peter Seales
- 1930/31 Alexander D. Orr
- 1931/32 Laurence J. Ryan
- 1932/33 W. Gorden Bradley
- 1933/34 James J. Lynch
- 1934/35 Charles Laverty
- 1935/36 Michael E. Knight
- 1936/37 John J. Duggan
- 1937/38 Thomas W. Delaney
- 1938/39 Daniel J. Reilly
- 1939/40 Henry P. Mayne
- 1940/41 J. Travers Wolfe
- 1941/42 G. Acheson Overend
- 1942/43 John B. Hamill
- 1943/44 Louis E. O'Dea
- 1944/45 Parick F. O'Reilly
- 1945/46 Daniel O'Connell
- 1946/47 H. St J. Blake
- 1947/48 Sean O hUadhaigh
- 1948/49 Patrick R. Boyd
- 1949/50 William J. Norman
- 1950/51 Roger Green
- 1951/52 Arthur Cox
- 1952/53 James R. Quirke
- 1953/54 Joseph Barrett
- 1954/55 Thomas A. O'Reilly
- 1955/56 Dermot P. Shaw
- 1956/57 Nial S. Gaffney
- 1957/58 John Carrigan
- 1958/59 John R. Halpin
- 1959/60 John J. Nash
- 1960/61 Ralph J. Walker
- 1961/62 George G. Overend
- 1962/63 Francis J. Lanigan
- 1963/64 Desmond J. Collins
- 1964/65 John Maher
- 1965/66 Robert McD. Taylor
- 1966/67 Patrick O'Donnell TD
- 1967/68 Parick Noonan
- 1968/69 Eunan McCarran
- 1969/70 James R. C. Green
- 1970/71 Brendan A. McGrath
- 1971/72 James W. O'Donovan
- 1972/73 Thomas V. O'Connor
- 1973/74 Peter D. M. Prentice
- 1974/75 William A. Osbourne
- 1975/76 Patrick G. Moore
- 1976/77 Bruce St John Blake
- 1977/78 Josseph L. Dundon
- 1978/79 Gerald Hickey
- 1979/80 Walter Beatty
- 1980/81 Moya Quinlan
- 1981/82 Brendan W. Allen
- 1982/83 Michael P. Houlihan
- 1983/84 Frank O'Donnell
- 1984/85 Anthony E. Collins
- 1985/86 Laurence Cullun
- 1986/87 David R. Pigot
- 1987/88 Thomas D. Shaw
- 1988/89 Maurice R. Curran
- 1989/90 Ernest Margetson
- 1990/91 Donal G. Binchy
- 1991/92 Adrian P. Bourke
- 1992/93 Raymond T. Monahan
- 1993/94 Michael V. O'Mahony
- 1994/95 Patrick A. Glynn
- 1995/96 Andrew F. Smyth
- 1996/97 Francis D. Daly
- 1997/98 Laurence K. Shields
- 1998/99 Patrick O'Connor
- 1999/2000 Anthony H. Ensor
- 2000/01 Ward McEllin
- 2001/02 Elma Lynch
- 2002/03 Geraldine M. Clarke
- 2003/04 Gerard F. Griffin
- 2004/05 Owen M. Binchy
- 2005/06 Michael Irvine
- 2006/07 Philip M. Joyce
- 2007/08 James MacGuill
- 2008/09 John D. Shaw
- 2009/10 Gerard Doherty
- 2010/11 John E. Costello
- 2011/12 Donald Binchy
- 2012/13 James McCourt
- 2013/14 John P. Shaw
- 2014/15 Kevin O'Higgins
- 2015/16 Simon Murphy
- 2016/17 Stuart Gilhooly
- 2017/18 Michael Quinlan
- 2018/19 Patrick Dorgan
- 2019/20 Michele O'Boyle
- 2020/21 James Cahill
- 2021/22 Michelle Ní Longáin

- 2022/23 Maura Derivan
- 2023/24 Barry MacCarthy
- 2024/25 Eamon Harrington

== Notable solicitors ==
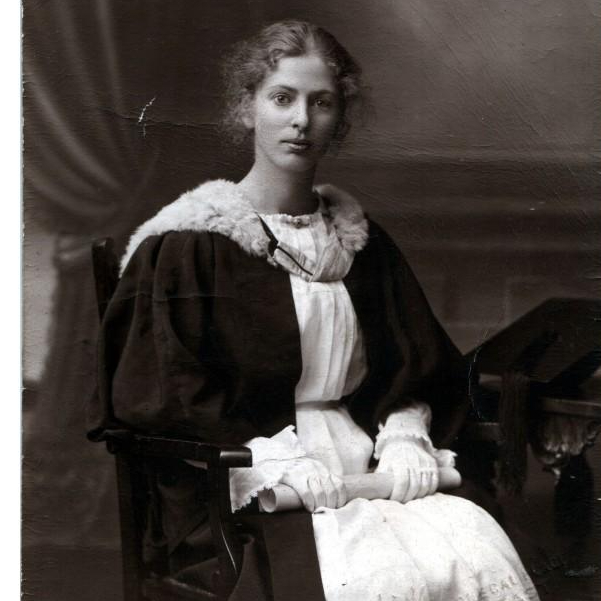
Dorothea Heron

Dorothea Heron was the first woman to be admitted to the roll of solicitors in Ireland, on 17 April 1923. Having commenced her studies prior to the partition of Ireland, she simultaneously qualified to practice on both sides of the newly created border. She did conveyancing work in her uncle's practice in Belfast but didn't take out practising certificates, as was common for non-court-going solicitors at the time.

== Arms ==
Coat of arms of Law Society of Ireland

Notes
Granted 17 June 1912 by Nevile Rodwell Wilkinson, Ulster King of Arms.
Crest
A figure of justice Proper.
Torse
Of the colours.
Escutcheon
Azure a harp Or stringed Argent on a chief Ermine a pale Gules charged with an Imperial crown Proper.
Supporters
Two Irish wolf hounds Or.

== See also ==
- Law Society of Northern Ireland, the professional association for solicitors in Northern Ireland
- Bar of Ireland, the professional association for barristers in the Republic of Ireland

== Sources ==
- Hogan, Daire; Hall, Eamonn G., eds. (2002). The Law Society of Ireland, 1852-2002: Portrait of a Profession. Dublin: Four Courts Press. ISBN 1-85182-695-5.
