= Vissi =

Vissi may refer to:

== People ==
- Anna Vissi (born 1957), Greek Cypriot singer and actress
- Lia Vissi (born 1955), Greek Cypriot singer, composer and politician

== Places ==
- Vissi, Põlva County, village in Valgjärve Parish, Põlva County, Estonia
- Vissi, Tartu County, village in Nõo Parish, Tartu County, Estonia
- Lake Vissi, lake in Vissi village, Nõo Parish, Tartu County, Estonia
