= Nõo =

Borough in Estonia

- Small borough
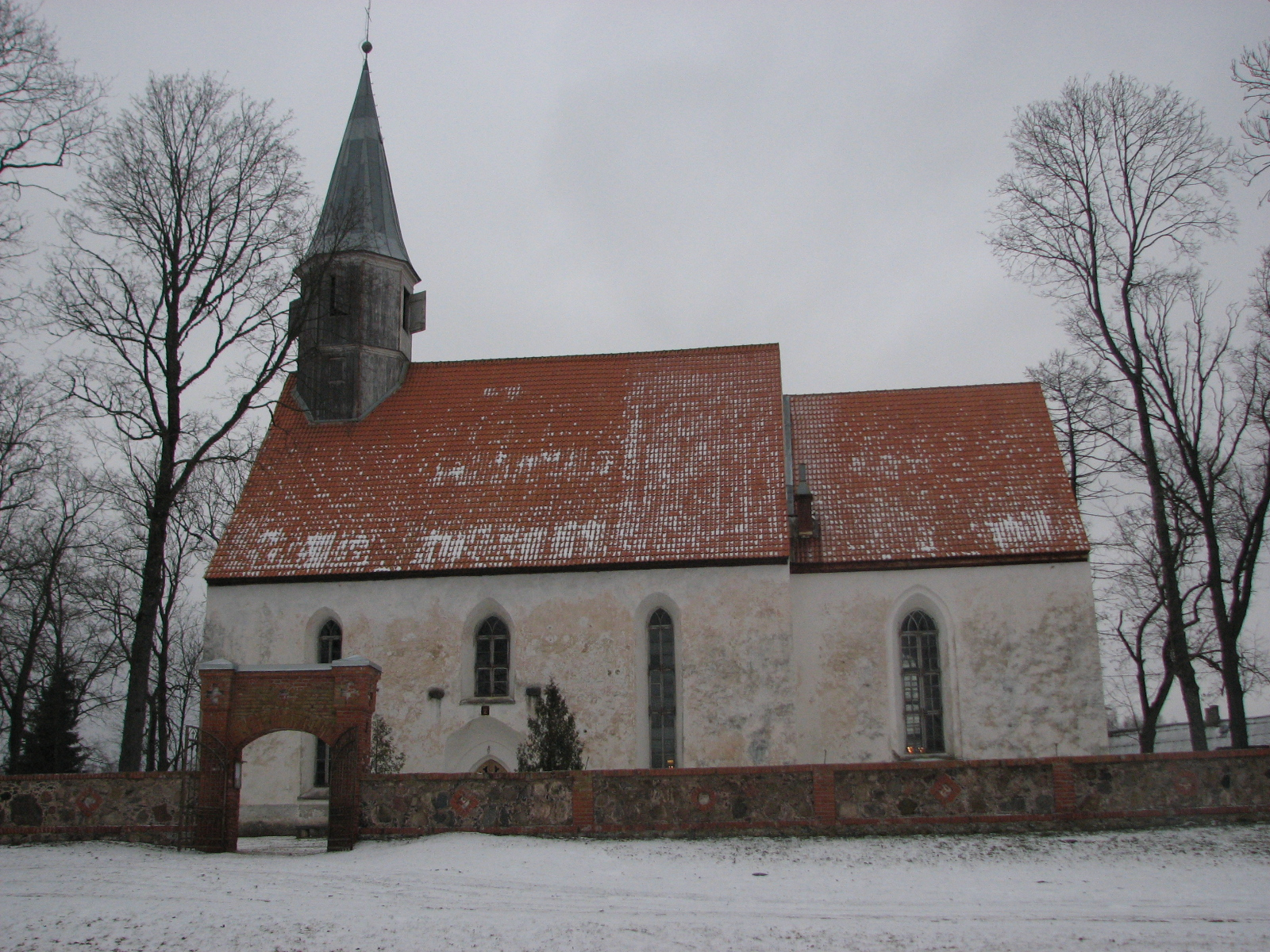
- Nõo St. Lawrence Lutheran church (Nõo Püha Laurentsiuse kirik)

- Location in Estonia
- Coordinates: 58°16′47″N 26°31′58″E
- Country: Estonia
- County: Tartu
- Municipality: Nõo
- First mentioned: 1319

Population (2011 Census)
  - Total: 1,492

Nõo (German: Nüggen) is a small borough (Estonian: alevik) in Tartu County, in southern Estonia. It's located about 15 km southwest of the city of Tartu by the Tartu–Valga–Riga railway and the European route E264 (also known as Via Hanseatica). Nõo is the administrative centre of Nõo Parish. As of the 2011 census, the settlement's population was 1,492.

Nõo was first mentioned in 1319 as Nughen and as a separate church parish in 1483, during the times when it belonged to the Bishopric of Dorpat. Nõo St. Laurence Lutheran Church is believed to have been built around the 1250s to 1260s.

According to Bengt Gottfried Forselius schooling took place in Nõo already in 1686. Since 1688 a local parish school has been working in Nõo. In 1953 the primary school was reorganized as a secondary school. In 1965 a computing centre was established, the school was given the first school computer in the USSR – the Ural-1. In 1994 Nõo school was separated into Nõo Secondary Science Gymnasium (Nõo Reaalgümnaasium) and Nõo Primary School (Nõo Põhikool).

== Notable people ==
- Ado Reinvald (1847–1922), writer and poet; lived in Nõo
- Martin Lipp (1854–1923), poet; served as the pastor of Nõo church
- Aleksander Läte (1860–1948), composer; worked at the Nõo school 1883–1900
- Eduard Tubin (1905–1982), composer and conductor; worked as a teacher in Nõo school
- Harald Tammur (1917–2001). Lutheran pastor of Nõo St. Lawrence Lutheran church from 1954 until 1979

== Gallery ==
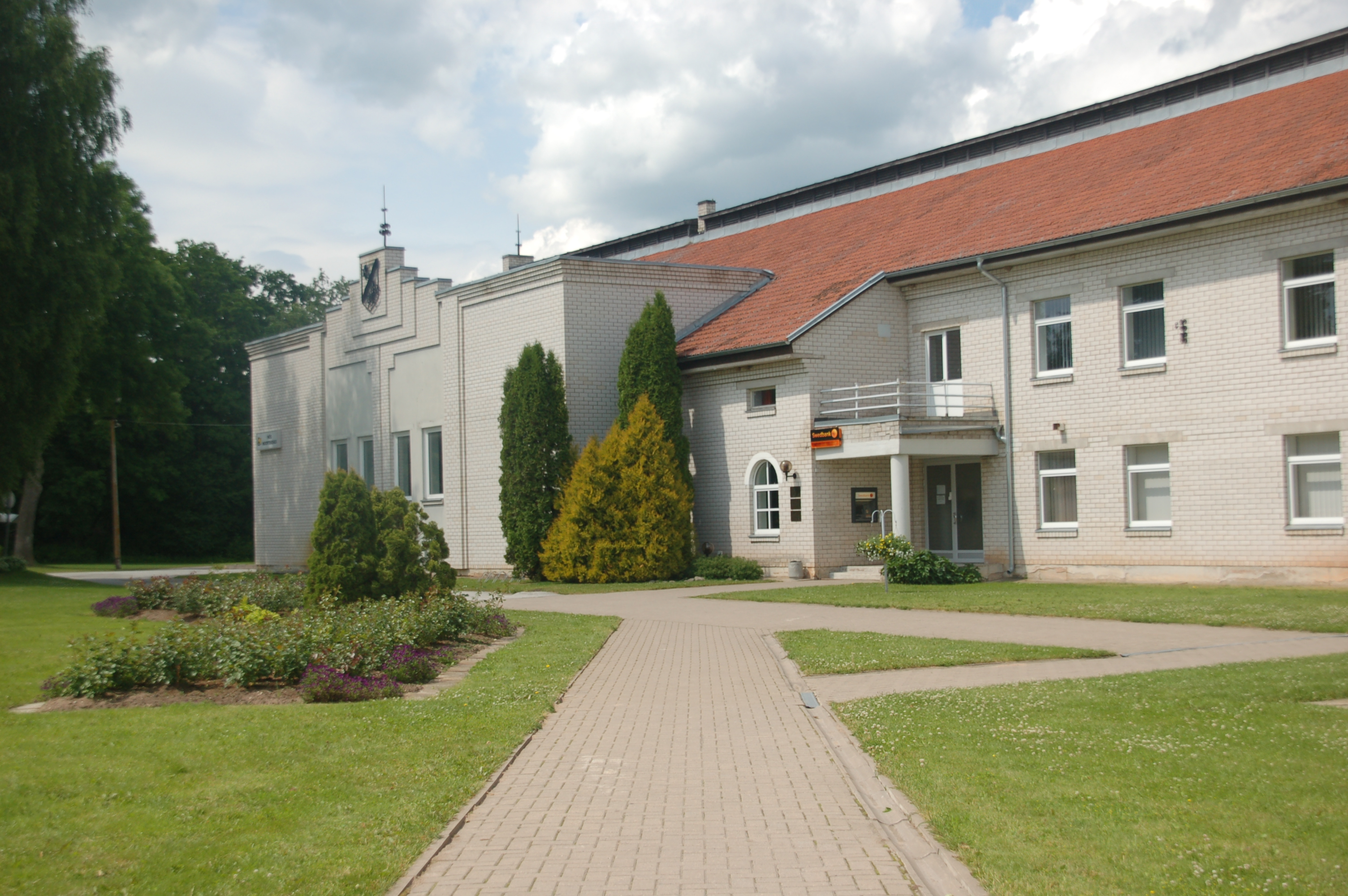
Nõo library and municipal building

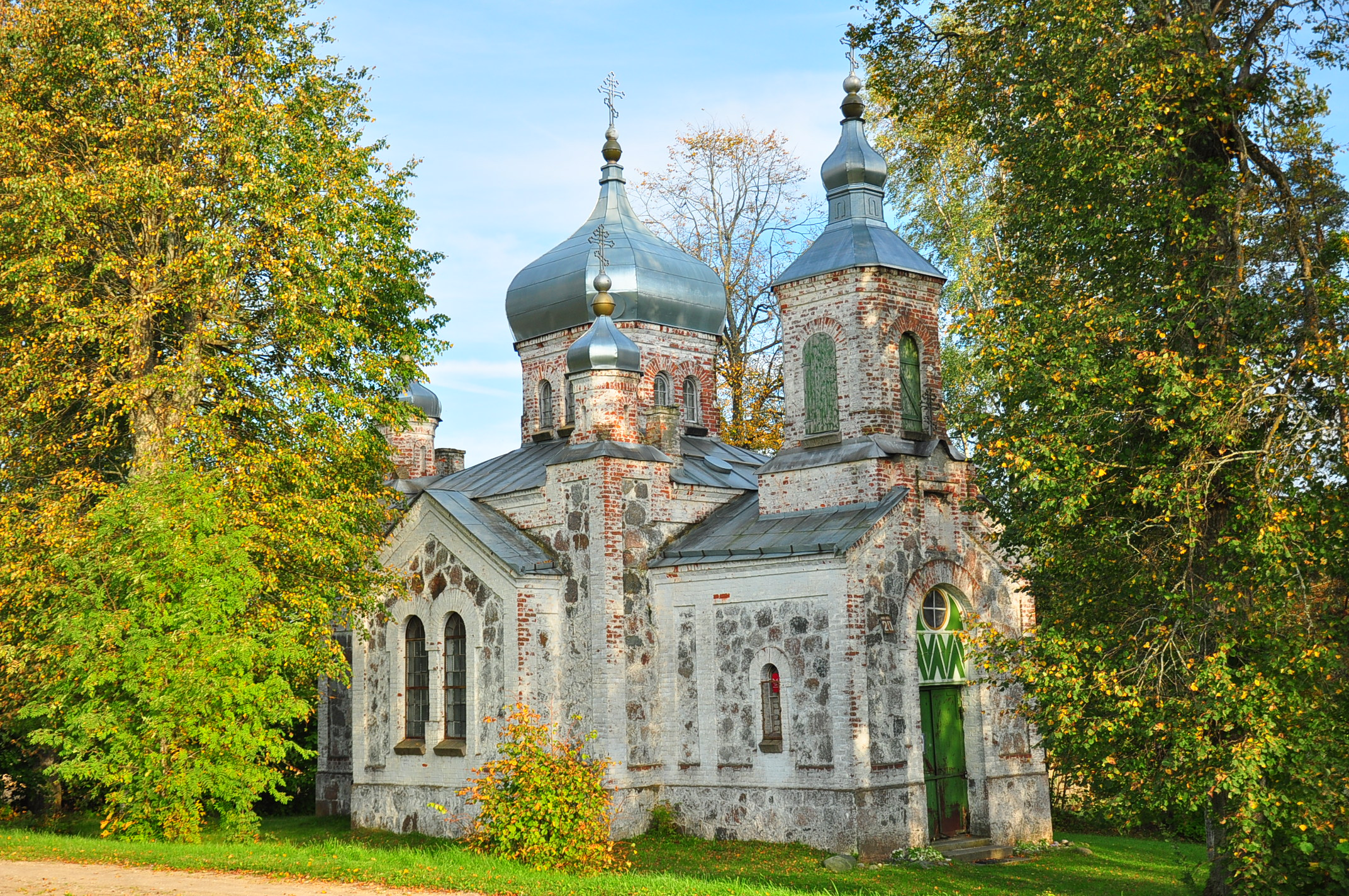
Nõo Orthodox Holy Trinity Church

Preceding station	Elron	Following station
Ropka towards Tallinn	Tallinn–Tartu–Valga	Tõravere towards Valga
