= Aadu (name) =

Estonian masculine given name

- Gender: Male
- Language: Estonian
- Name day: 6 November

Origin
- Region of origin: Estonia

Other names
- Related names: Ado, Adam, Adolf

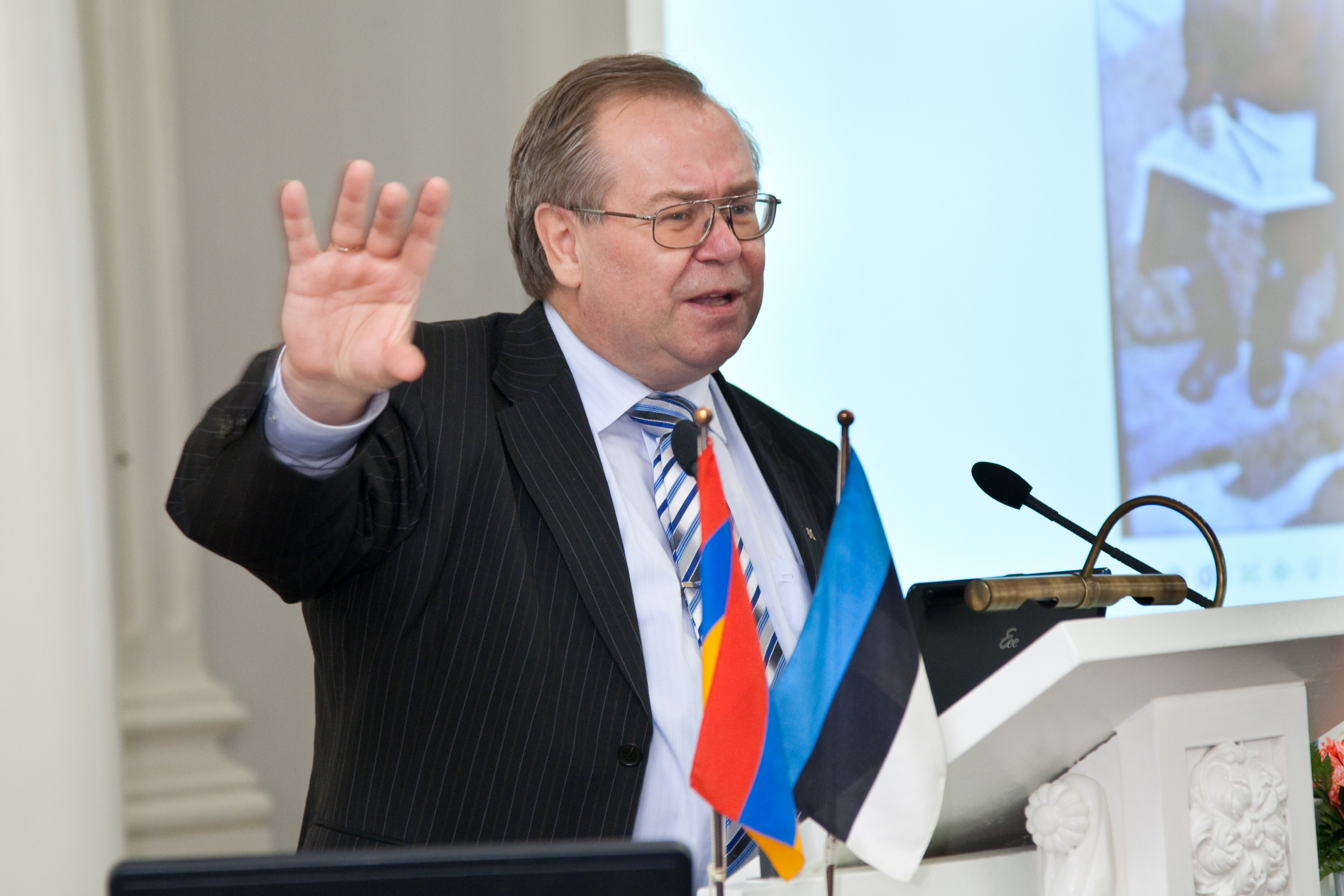
Aadu Must

Aadu is an Estonian male given name.

Variants include Aado and Ado. All these names are variants of the names Adam and Adolf.

Some of the known bearers of this name are:

- Aadu Birk or Ado Birk (1883–1942), Estonian politician and Prime Minister of Estonia
- Aadu Hint (1910–1989), Estonian writer
- Aadu Luukas (1939–2006), Estonian businessman
- Aadu Lüüs (1878–1967), Estonian pediatrician and medical scientist
- Aadu Must (1951–2023), Estonian historian and politician
