= Ado (name) =

Other names
- Related names: Aadu

Ado is a given name. It is sometimes used as a short form of Adnan (name), commonly used in Bosnia.

People named Ado include:

== Estonians ==
- Ado Anderkopp (1894–1941), Estonian politician, journalist and sport personality
- Ado Birk (1883–1942), Estonian politician
- Ado Grenzstein (1849–1916), Estonian journalist
- Ado Johanson (1874–1932), Estonian politician
- Ado Kurvits (1897–1958), Estonian Communist politician
- Ado Reinvald (1847–1922), Estonian poet
- Ado Rõõmussaar (1891–1970), Estonian politician
- Ado Roosiorg (1887–1942), Estonian agronomist and politician
- Ado Vabbe (1892–1961), Estonian painter, graphics artist and teacher

== Others ==
- Ado (fl. 1550), Akwamuhene ruler of the Akan people
- Ado (footballer) (born 1947), Brazilian footballer
- Ado (Lagos Oba), 1st Oba of Lagos
- Ado (preceptor), monk of Goguryeo
- Ado (singer) (born 2002), Japanese singer
- Ado of Friuli (died 695), Lombard duke
- Ado of Jouarre (died 670), founder of Jouarre Abbey
- Ado of Vienne (died 874), Frankish archbishop of Vienna
- Ado Campeol (1927/1928–2021), Italian restaurateur
- Ado Endoh (born 1973) Japanese actress
- Ado Kraemer (1898–1972), German chess master and problemist
- Ado Onaiwu (born 1995), Japanese footballer

== See also ==
- Aadu (name)
- Otto
