= Elva Landscape Conservation Area =

Protected area in Estonia

- Location within Estonia
- Location: Estonia
- Coordinates: 58°11′N 26°25′E
- Area: 1,064 ha (2,630 acres)
- Established: 2016

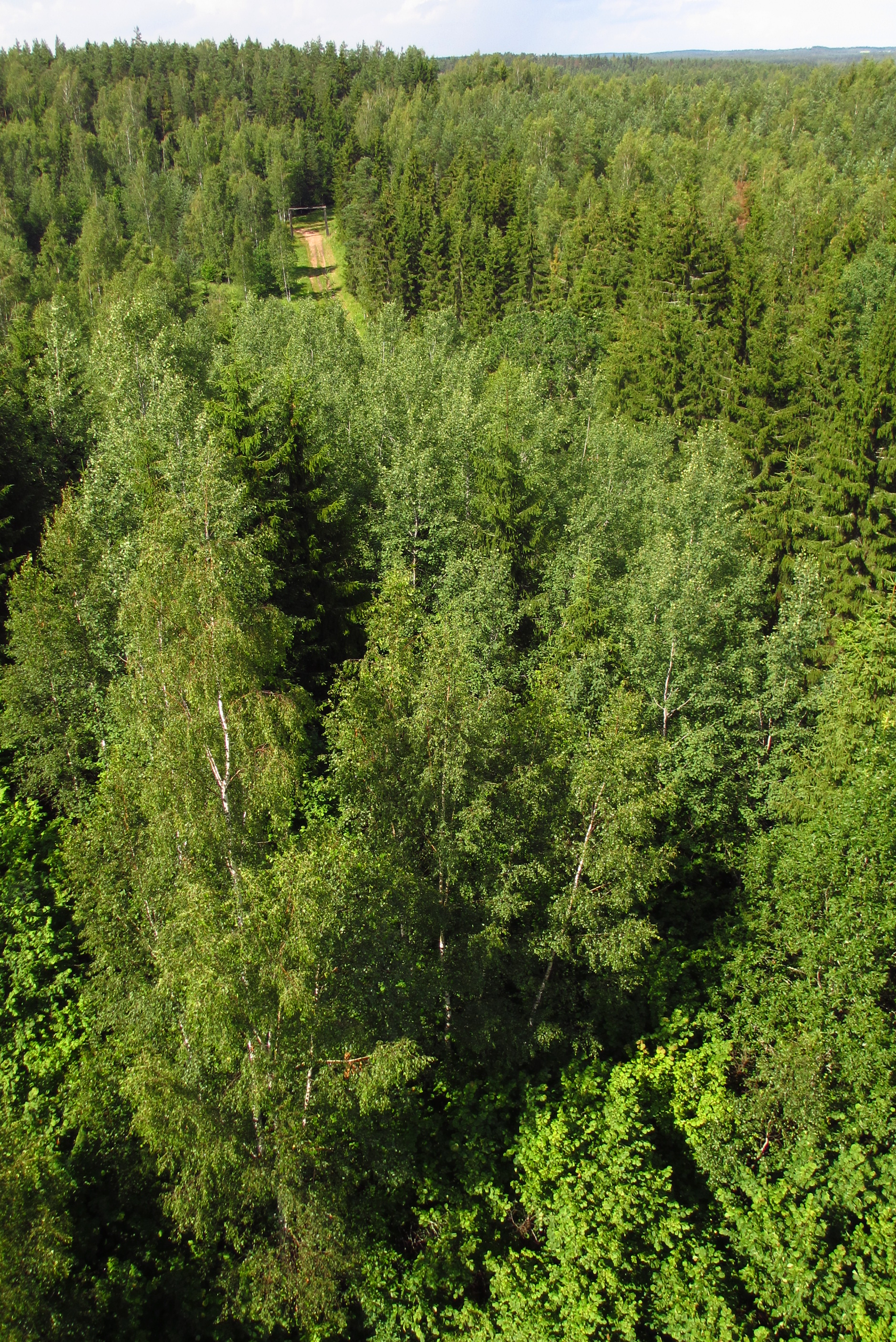
View of the Elva Landscape Conservation Area

Elva Landscape Conservation Area is a nature park situated in Tartu County, Estonia.

Its area is 1064 ha.

The protected area was designated in 2016 to protect areas and nature of Elva Parish and adjacent areas from Nõo and Otepää Parish.
