= Ketneri =

Village in Estonia

- Village
- Location within Estonia
- Coordinates: 58°10′N 26°26′E
- Country: Estonia
- County: Tartu County
- Parish: Nõo Parish
- Time zone: UTC+2 (EET)
  - Summer (DST): UTC+3 (EEST)

Ketneri is a small village in southern Estonia. It is situated in Nõo Municipality, Tartu County.

As of January 1, 2005, the village's population was 14 and it counted 7 active households.

There are many tourist locations around the village, like Otepää Nature Park, Vitipalu Watch Tower and a forest with various rare species.
