= Otepää Upland =

Upland in Estonia

Coordinates: 58°05′22″N 26°36′34″E

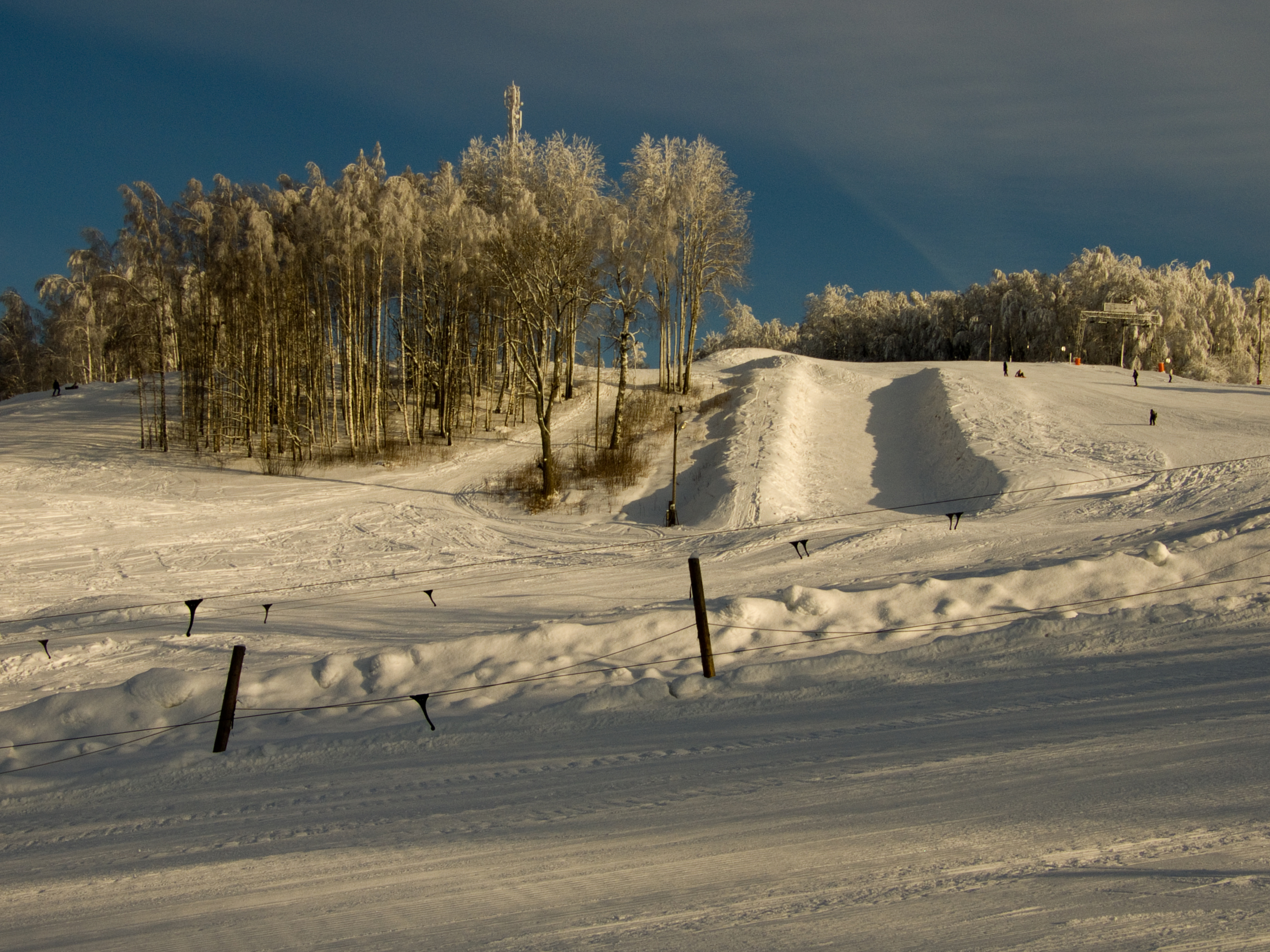
Kuutsemägi

Otepää Upland (Estonian: Otepää kõrgustik) is hilly area of higher elevation in Southern Estonia.

Upland's area is about 1200 km2.

The highest point of upland is Kuutsemägi (217 m).

Part of upland is taken under protection (Otepää Nature Park).
