= Sassi, Estonia =

Village in Estonia

Coordinates: 58°10′02″N 26°27′56″E

- Village
- Interactive map of Sassi, Estonia
- Country: Estonia
- County: Tartu County
- Parish: Nõo Parish
- Time zone: UTC+2 (EET)
  - Summer (DST): UTC+3 (EEST)

Sassi is a village in Nõo Parish, Tartu County in eastern Estonia.
