= Tõravere =

Borough in Estonia

- Small borough
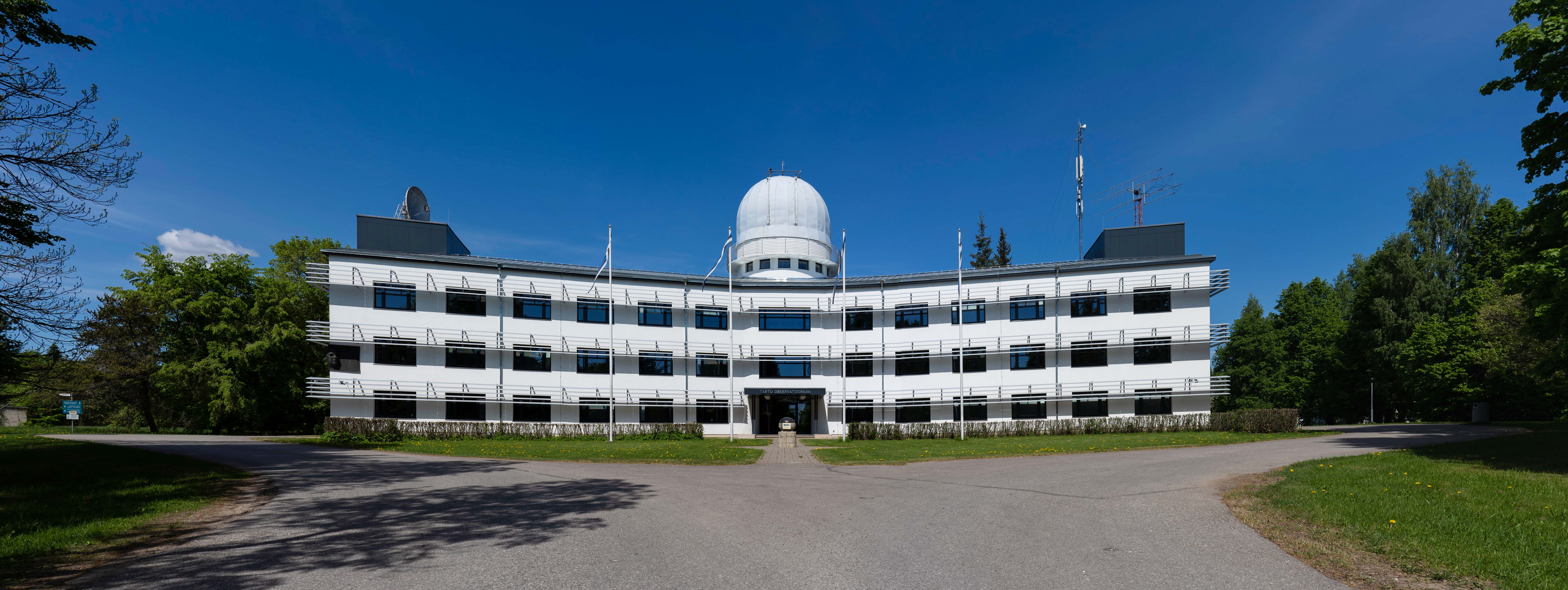
- The main building of Tartu Observatory.

- Location in Estonia
- Coordinates: 58°16′0″N 26°28′0″E
- Country: Estonia
- County: Tartu County
- Municipality: Nõo Parish
- First mentioned: 1582

Population (01.01.2012)
  - Total: 289

Tõravere is a small borough (Estonian: alevik) in Nõo Parish, Tartu County, in southern Estonia. It is located about 5 km northeast of the town of Elva and about 20 km southwest of the city of Tartu. Tõravere has a population of 289 (as of 1 January 2012).

Tõravere is best known as the location of Estonian biggest professional astronomical science centre Tartu Observatory.

Tõravere has a station on link between Tartu and Valga.

Tõravere was first mentioned in 1582 as Terrawera.

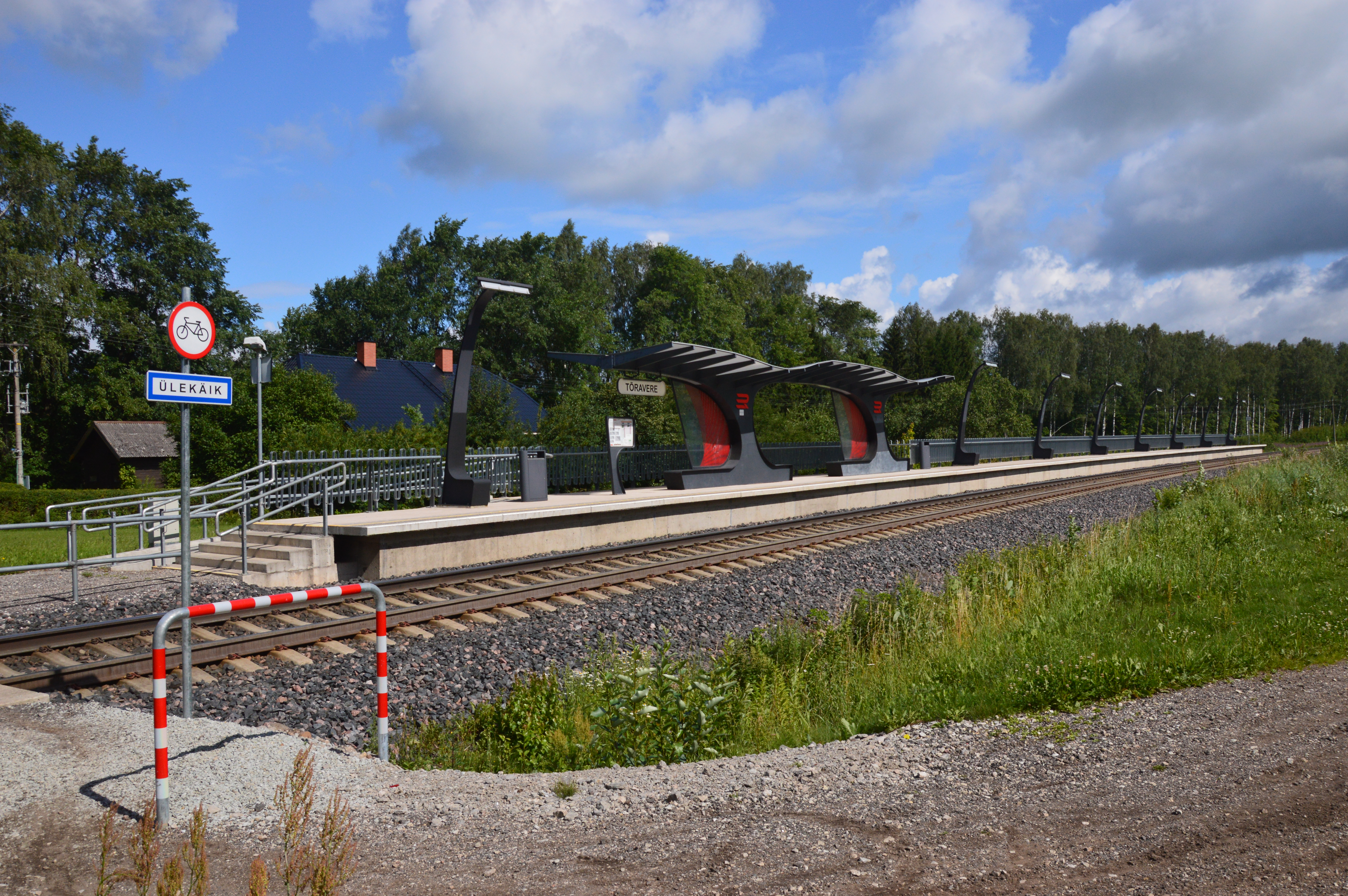
Tõravere railway station

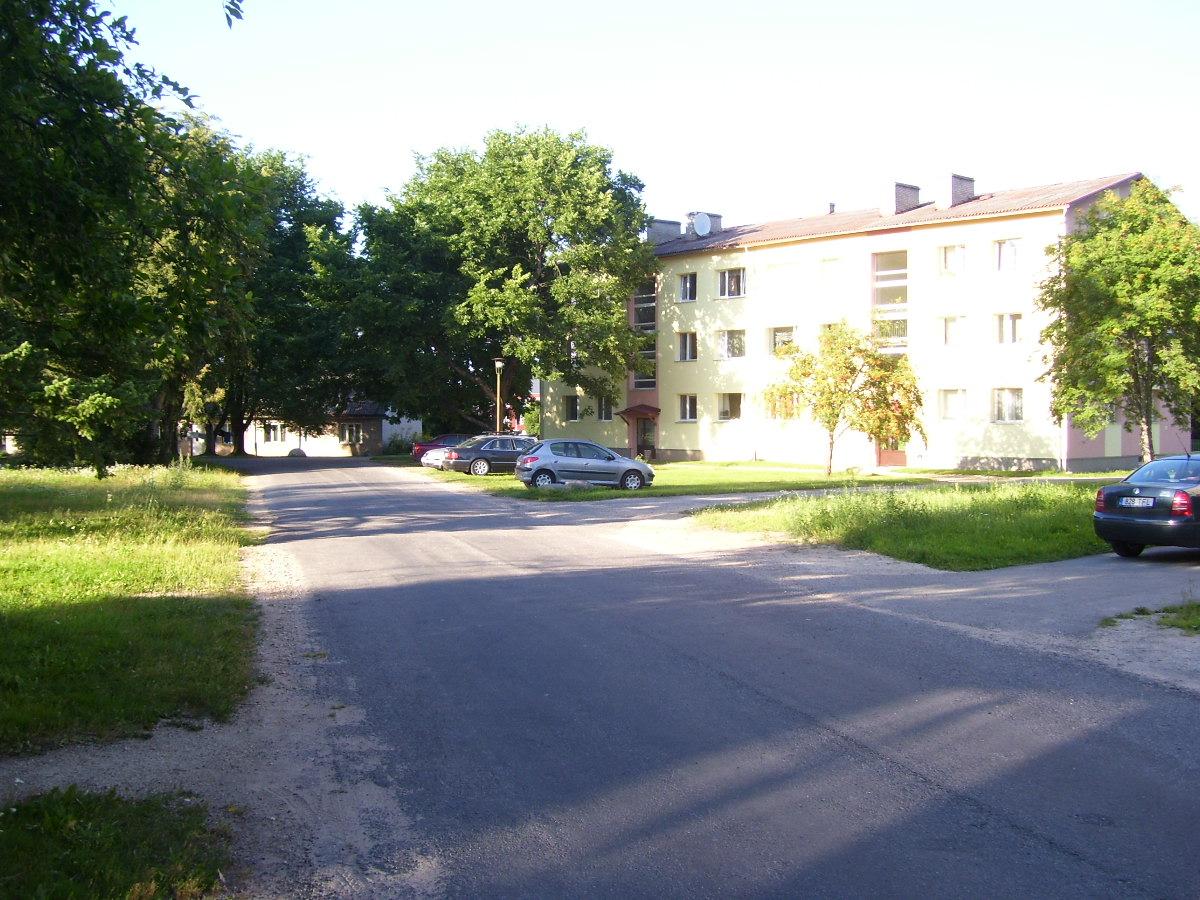
Street in Tõravere

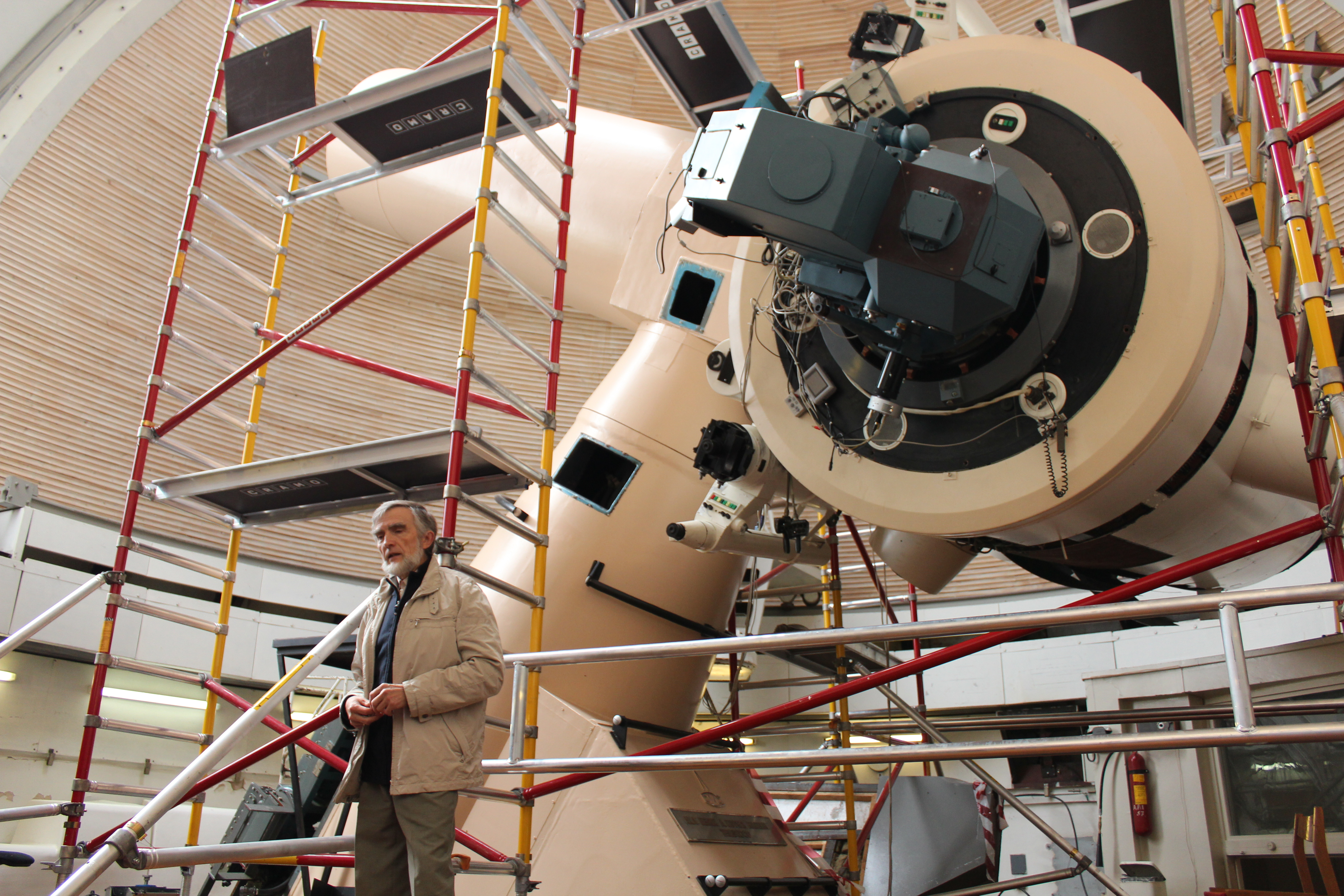
Estonian biggest telescope inside the observatory.

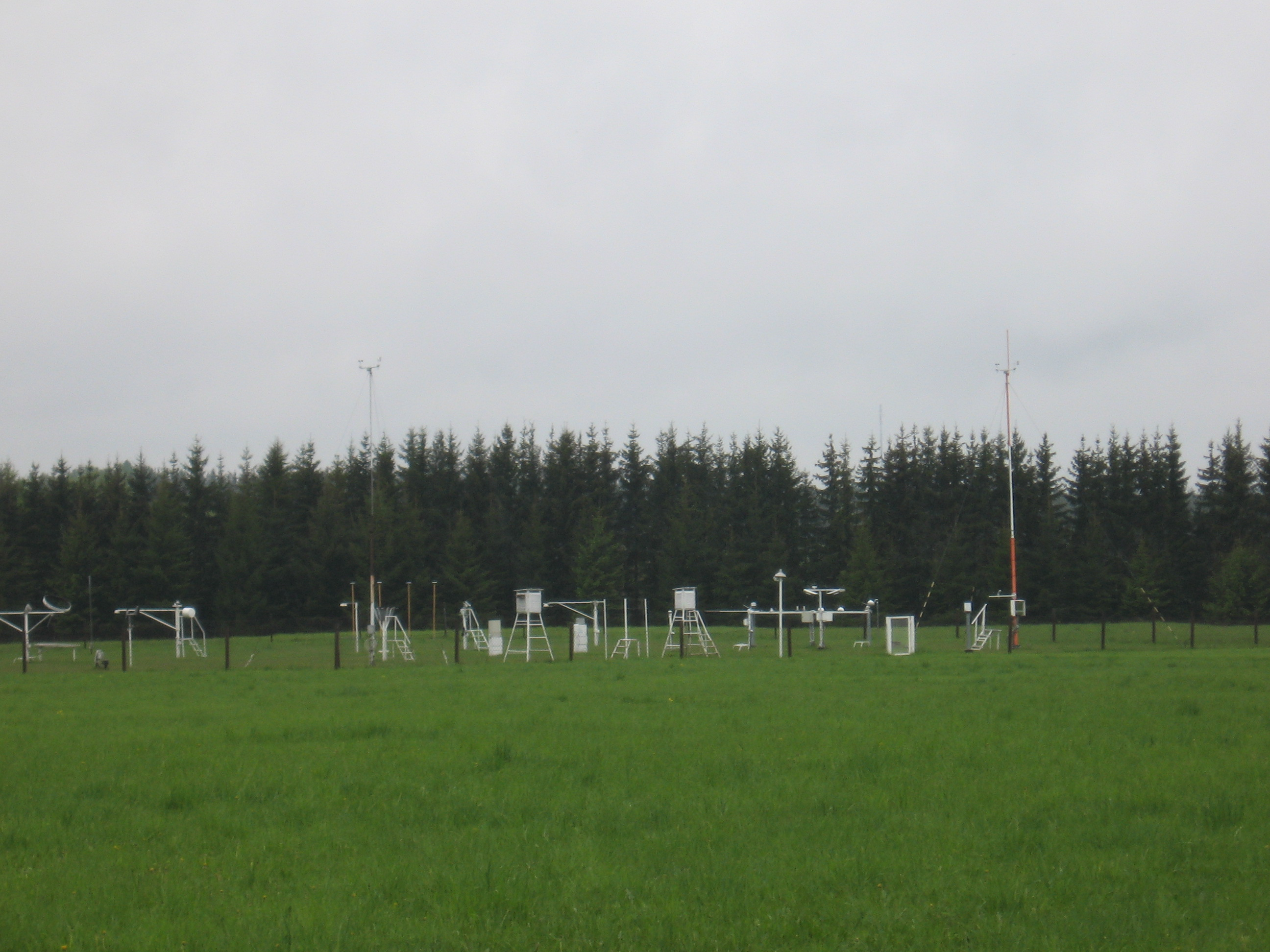
Tõravere weather station

== Climate ==
The weather station, known as the Tartu weather station, is located in Tõravere.

Climate data for Tartu - Tõravere normals 1991–2020, extremes (Tartu) 1865–present
Month	Jan	Feb	Mar	Apr	May	Jun	Jul	Aug	Sep	Oct	Nov	Dec	Year
Record high °C (°F)	9.7 (49.5)	10.9 (51.6)	18.4 (65.1)	27.6 (81.7)	30.9 (87.6)	34.0 (93.2)	34.9 (94.8)	35.2 (95.4)	30.3 (86.5)	21.5 (70.7)	13.8 (56.8)	13.0 (55.4)	35.2 (95.4)
Mean daily maximum °C (°F)	−1.8 (28.8)	−1.6 (29.1)	3.3 (37.9)	11.1 (52.0)	17.1 (62.8)	20.6 (69.1)	23.1 (73.6)	21.8 (71.2)	16.3 (61.3)	9.2 (48.6)	3.3 (37.9)	0.0 (32.0)	10.2 (50.4)
Daily mean °C (°F)	−4.1 (24.6)	−4.4 (24.1)	−0.5 (31.1)	5.9 (42.6)	11.5 (52.7)	15.5 (59.9)	18.0 (64.4)	16.7 (62.1)	11.8 (53.2)	6.0 (42.8)	1.2 (34.2)	−2.1 (28.2)	6.3 (43.3)
Mean daily minimum °C (°F)	−6.5 (20.3)	−7.3 (18.9)	−4 (25)	1.2 (34.2)	5.8 (42.4)	10.3 (50.5)	12.9 (55.2)	12.0 (53.6)	8.0 (46.4)	3.3 (37.9)	−0.8 (30.6)	−4.2 (24.4)	2.6 (36.7)
Record low °C (°F)	−37.5 (−35.5)	−36.0 (−32.8)	−29.6 (−21.3)	−19.8 (−3.6)	−7.2 (19.0)	−2.2 (28.0)	1.8 (35.2)	1.5 (34.7)	−6.6 (20.1)	−13.8 (7.2)	−22.2 (−8.0)	−38.6 (−37.5)	−38.6 (−37.5)
Average precipitation mm (inches)	48 (1.9)	39 (1.5)	36 (1.4)	35 (1.4)	54 (2.1)	88 (3.5)	67 (2.6)	79 (3.1)	55 (2.2)	68 (2.7)	55 (2.2)	51 (2.0)	673 (26.5)
Average precipitation days (≥ 1.0 mm)	12.8	9.9	9.3	8.3	8.5	10.7	9.5	11.2	9.8	11.9	11.3	12.4	125.6
Average relative humidity (%)	88	85	76	68	65	70	74	77	82	86	89	89	79
Average dew point °C (°F)	−7 (19)	−8 (18)	−4 (25)	0 (32)	6 (43)	10 (50)	13 (55)	13 (55)	9 (48)	4 (39)	1 (34)	−3 (27)	3 (37)
Mean monthly sunshine hours	33.7	65.1	140.3	190.9	266.0	258.0	268.7	227.6	152.1	79.3	30.0	24.3	1,735.9
Source 1: Estonian Weather Service
Source 2: Time and Date (dewpoints, 2005-2015)

Preceding station	Elron	Following station
Nõo towards Tallinn	Tallinn–Tartu–Valga	Peedu towards Valga
