= Unipiha =

Village in Estonia

Coordinates: 58°16′N 26°36′E

- Village
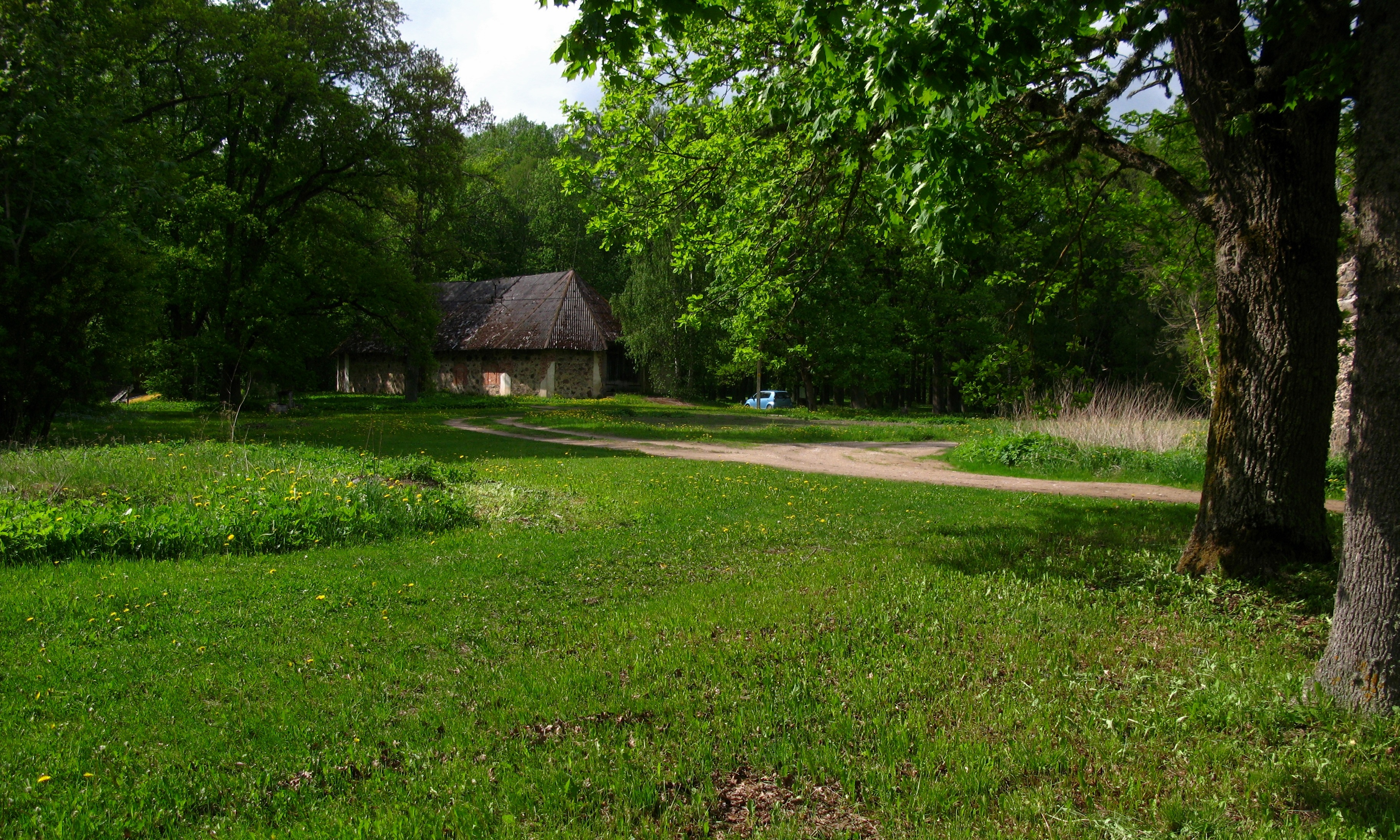
- Unipiha manor park
- Interactive map of Unipiha
- Country: Estonia
- County: Tartu
- Parish: Nõo
- Time zone: UTC+02:00 (EET)
  - Summer (DST): UTC+03:00 (EEST)

Unipiha is a village in Nõo Parish, Tartu County in eastern Estonia.
