= Enno, Estonia =

Village in Estonia

Enno
- Village
- Location within Estonia
- Coordinates: 58°12′40″N 26°30′28″E
- Country: Estonia
- County: Tartu County
- Parish: Nõo Parish
- Time zone: UTC+2 (EET)
  - Summer (DST): UTC+3 (EEST)

Enno is a village in Nõo Parish, Tartu County in eastern Estonia.
