= Aiamaa =

Village in Estonia

- Village
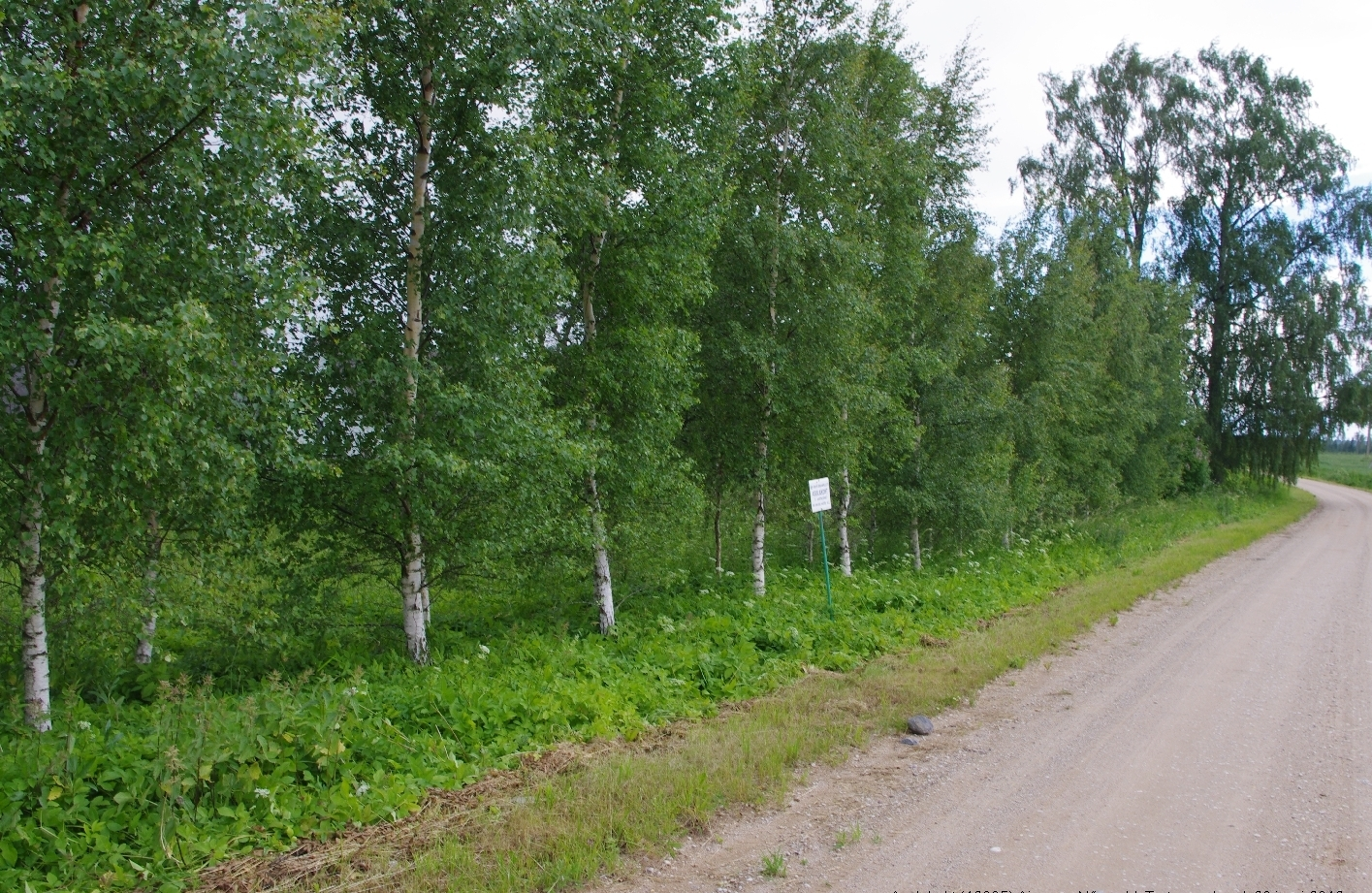
- Village road in Aiamaa

- Location in Estonia
- Coordinates: 58°17′06″N 26°35′48″E
- Country: Estonia
- County: Tartu County
- Parish: Nõo Parish
- Time zone: UTC+2 (EET)
  - Summer (DST): UTC+3 (EEST)

Aiamaa is a village in Nõo Parish, Tartu County in eastern Estonia.

== History ==
Aiamaa was first mentioned in 1582 under the name Aiamegi.

The settlement was located within the territory of the estate of Meeri.

Aiamaa received a station on the Tartu – Valga railway line in the 1930s, which closed in 2008.
