= Keeri =

Village in Estonia

- Village
- Location within Estonia
- Coordinates: 58.324722222222°N 26.500277777778°E
- Country: Estonia
- County: Tartu County
- Parish: Nõo Parish
- Time zone: UTC+2 (EET)
  - Summer (DST): UTC+3 (EEST)

Keeri is a village in Nõo Parish, Tartu County in Estonia.
