= Järiste =

Village in Estonia

Coordinates: 58°18′N 26°34′E

- Village
- Interactive map of Järiste
- Country: Estonia
- County: Tartu County
- Parish: Nõo Parish
- Time zone: UTC+2 (EET)
  - Summer (DST): UTC+3 (EEST)

Järiste is a village in Nõo Parish, Tartu County in eastern Estonia.
