= Luke Manor =

Manor in Estonia

Coordinates: 58°14′35″N 26°34′30″E

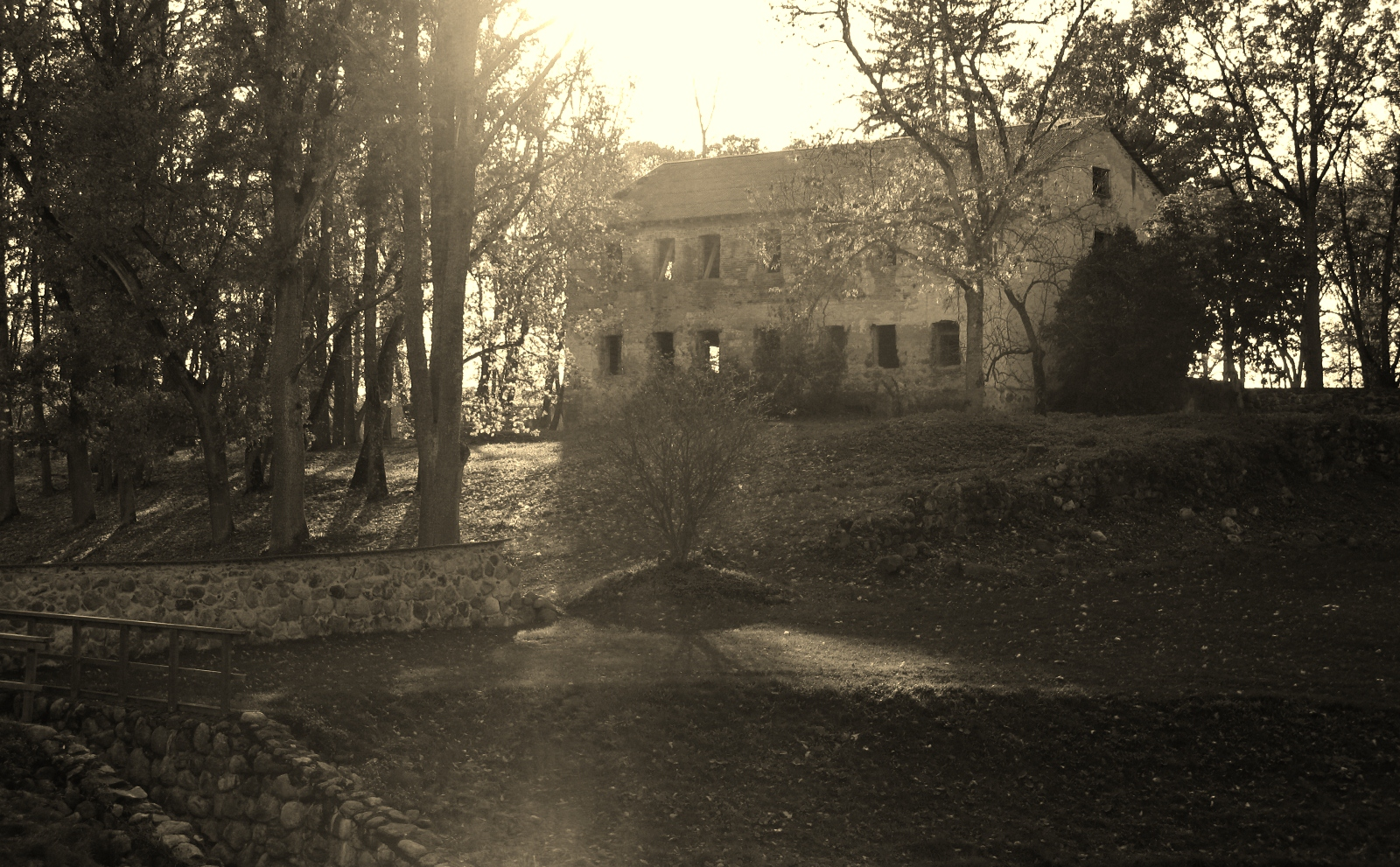
The steward's house

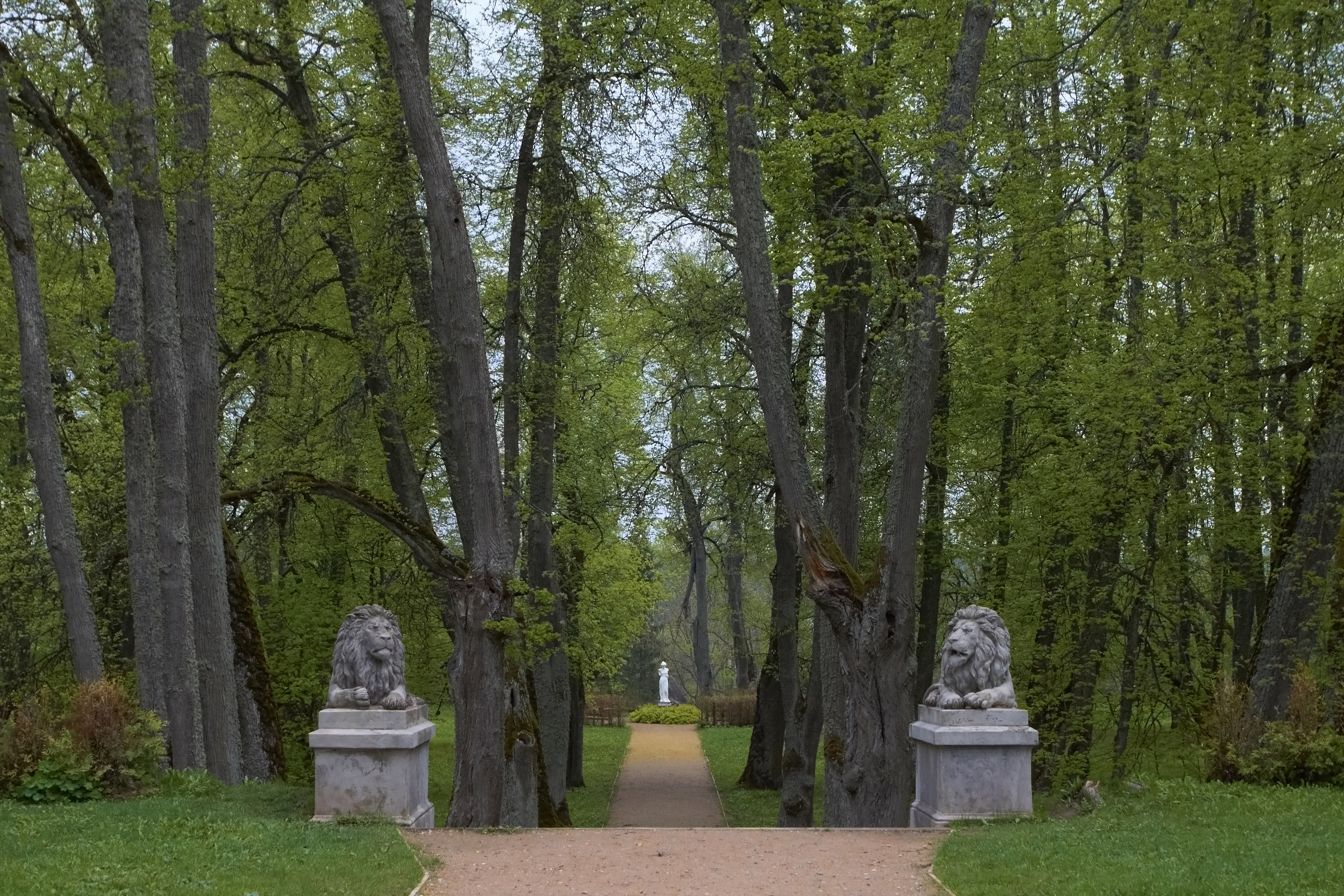
Park

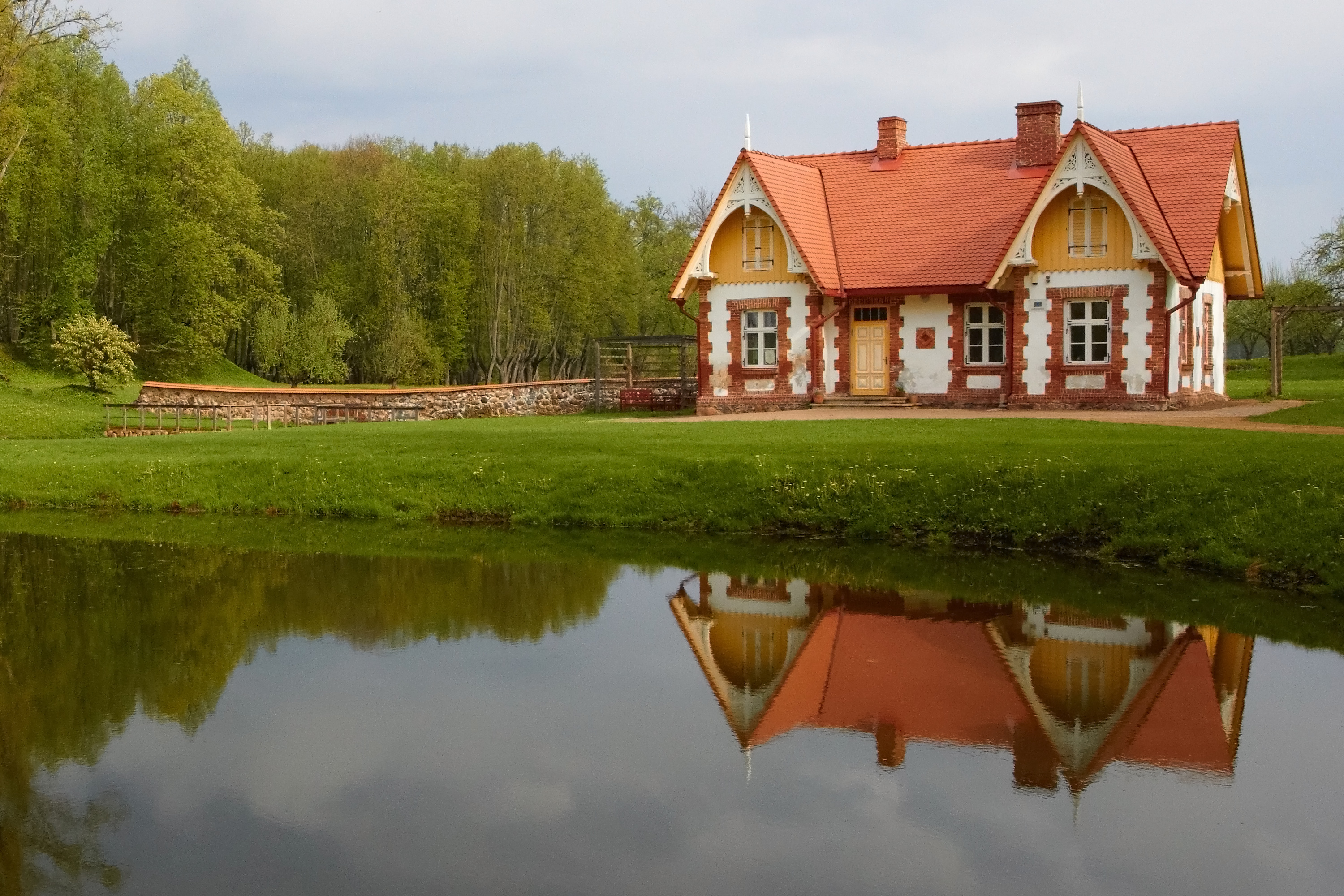
The gardener's house

Luke Manor (Estonian: Luke mõis) is a manor near Tartu, Estonia. It is located in Luke village, Nõo Parish.

== History ==
The earliest mentionings of Luke Manor (German: Lugden) originate from 1557, but it may have been established in 1299 by Johann von Löwenwolde. The main building has been destroyed twice, first during the Livonian War and again during World War II. The last owners of Luke Manor were the Knorring family and it was managed by three generations of the Lesthal family - Hans, Juhan and Alexander Lesthal.

== Today ==
Nowadays the manor park is one of the main visitor attractions in the area. With cascading ponds, decorative elms and a lime-tree labyrinth, visitors are enchanted by the grounds. Recently, the manor complex, gardener's house, pond with a series of cascades, and small pavilion have all been restored.
