= Voika =

Village in Estonia

- Village
- Location within Estonia
- Coordinates: 58°16′N 26°29′E
- Country: Estonia
- County: Tartu County
- Parish: Nõo Parish

Population (2011-12-31)
  - Total: 203
- Time zone: UTC+2 (EET)
  - Summer (DST): UTC+3 (EEST)

Voika is a village in Nõo Parish, Tartu County in eastern Estonia.

In the last major census count, Voika had a population of 203 residents.

Lake Voika is a small, local reservoir inside of Voika.
