= Aadu Luukas =

Estonian businessman and sport personnel

Aadu Luukas (24 September 1939, in Tallinn – 7 October 2006, in Viimsi) was an Estonian businessman and sport personnel.

Since 1992, he was the head of the company AS Pakterminal.

Since 1997, he was the president of Estonian Volleyball Federation.

In 2003, he was awarded the Order of the White Star, III Class and in 2006, he was awarded with Order of the White Star, II class.
