= Illi, Tartu County =

Village in Estonia

Coordinates: 58°12′12″N 26°26′54″E

- Village
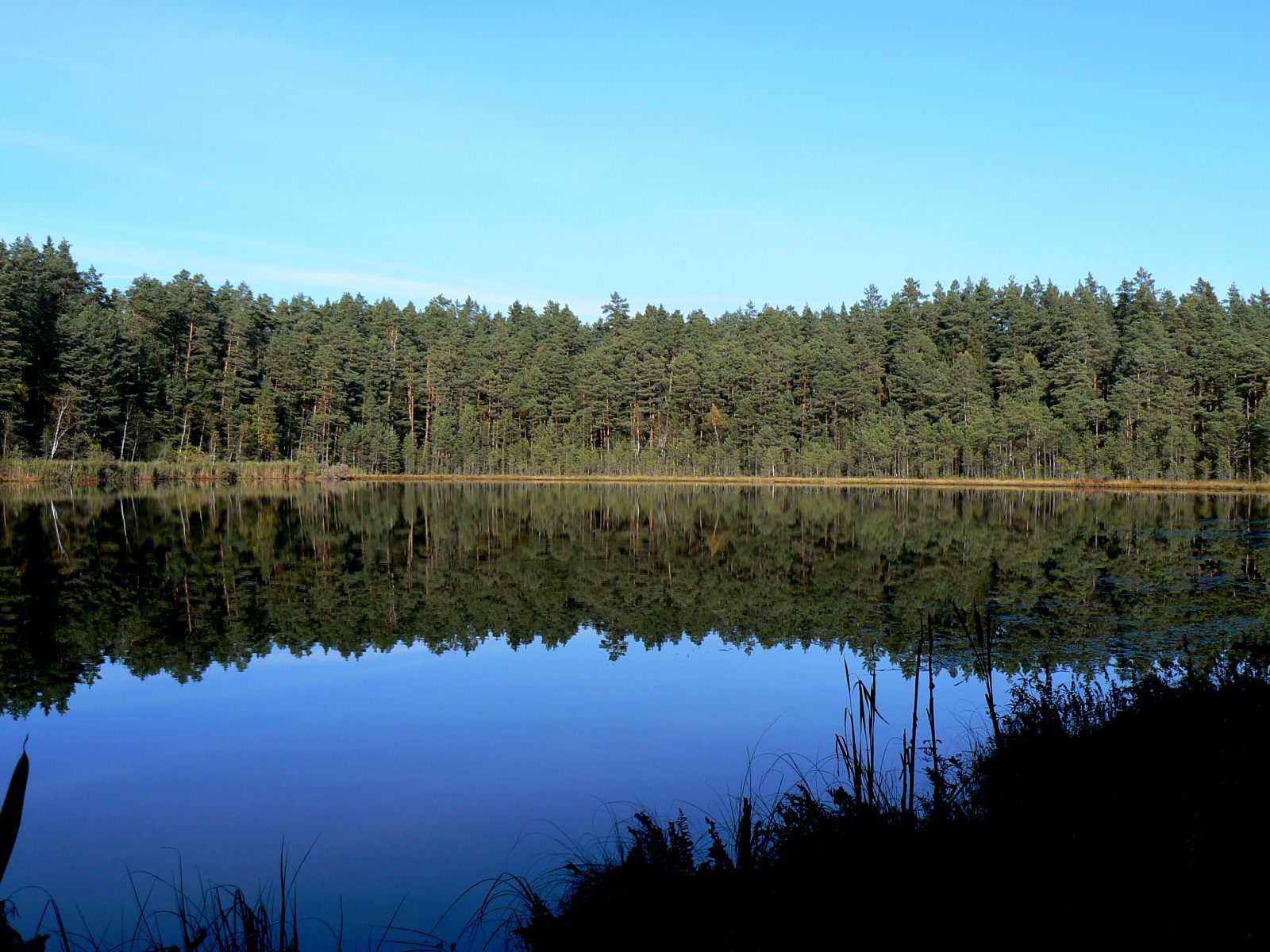
- Umbjärv (also Illi Umbjärv and Suur Umbjärv), a lake in Illi
- Interactive map of Illi, Tartu County
- Country: Estonia
- County: Tartu County
- Parish: Nõo Parish
- Time zone: UTC+2 (EET)
  - Summer (DST): UTC+3 (EEST)

Illi is a village in Nõo Parish, Tartu County in eastern Estonia.
