= Tartu Observatory =

Astronomical observatory in Estonia

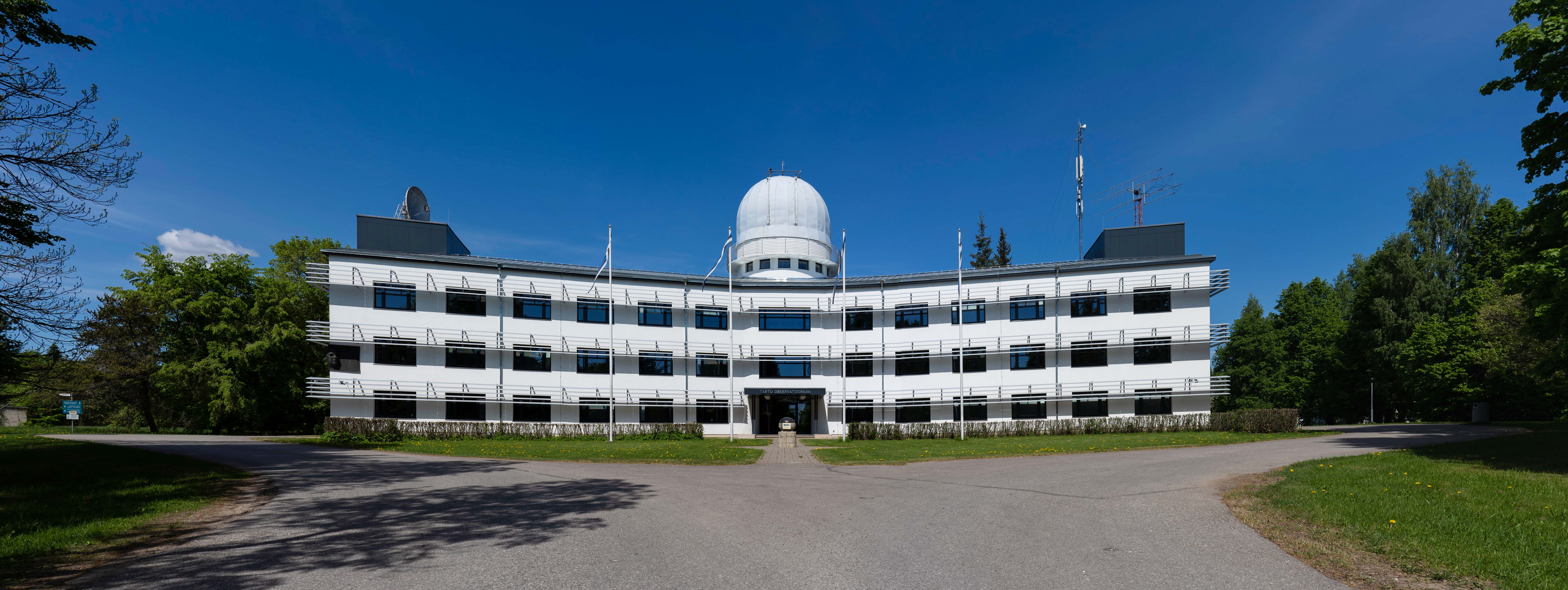
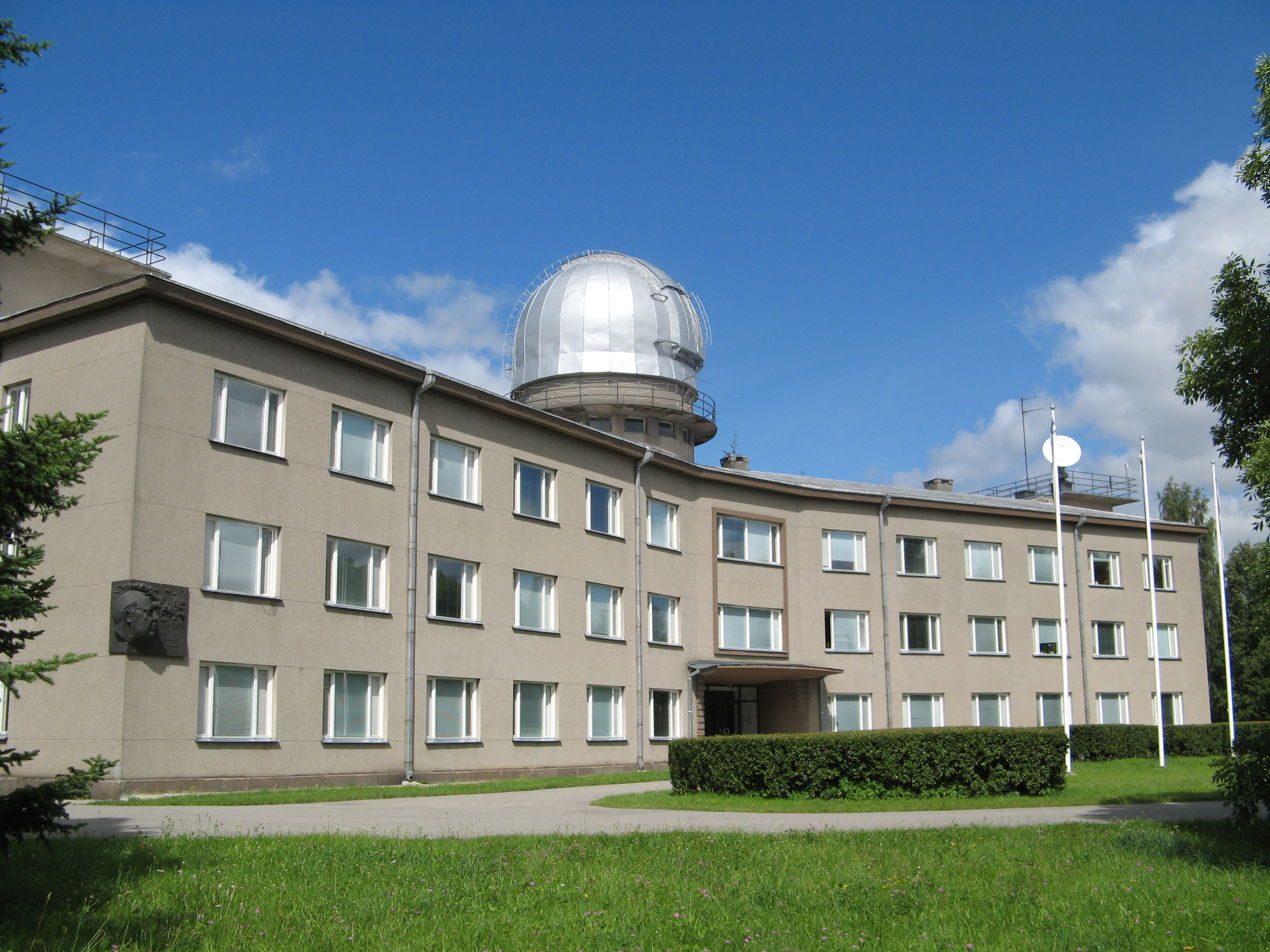
- Main Building of the Tartu Observatory.
- Alternative names: Tartu Observatory of Tartu University
- Organization: Tartu Observatory
- Observatory code: L75
- Location: Tõravere, Estonia
- Coordinates: 58°15′57″N 26°27′58″E
- Observing time: 100 nights per year
- Established: 1810, 1964 (relocation)
- Website: kosmos.ut.ee

Telescopes
- AZT-12: 1.5 m Cassegrain telescope
- Zeiss 600: 0.6 m reflecting telescope
- RAITS: 0.31 m reflecting telescope
- Related media on Commons

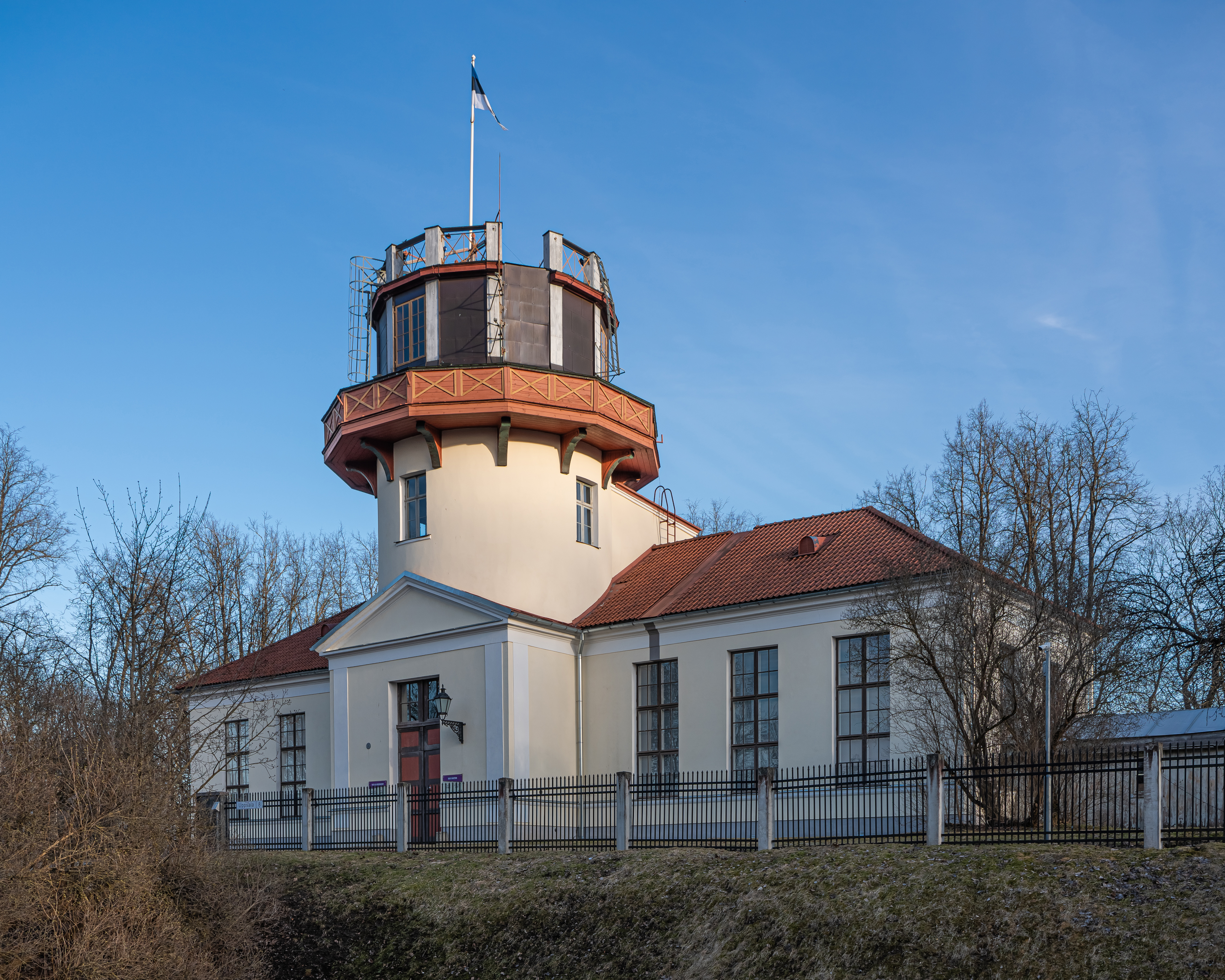
The old observatory building in Tartu. 58°22′43.64″N 26°43′12.61″E

The Tartu Observatory (Estonian: Tartu Observatoorium) is the largest astronomical observatory in Estonia. On 1 January 2018, Tartu Observatory was joined again to the University of Tartu, and the observatory is now an institute of the university. It is located on the Tõravere hill, about 20 km south-west of Tartu in Nõo Parish, Tartu County. The old Tartu Observatory, located in Tartu city centre, is known internationally for its connection to Friedrich Georg Wilhelm von Struve and the Struve Geodetic Arc, of which it is the first reference point.

== History ==
The Tartu Observatory was founded at the Imperial University of Dorpat as it was reopened in 1802. The observatory building was completed in 1810 on the Toome hill in Dorpat. The instruments were installed in 1814 by von Struve who subsequently started observations. In 1824, a 9" Fraunhofer refractor arrived, the largest achromatic telescope in the world at the time. When von Struve began assembling his Geodetic Arc in 1816, the doorstep of the observatory became its first point.

In 1946 the renamed Tartu Observatory was separated from the university and subjected to the Estonian Academy of Sciences. The authorities started to look for the new observational base in 1950. A patch of land on the Tõravere hill was assigned for the purpose and in 1958 construction began. By 1963, the new observatory building was completed, part of the astronomers from the old observatory moved in, and the 50 cm reflector telescope had first light. In 1964, an international conference was held and the Tartu Observatory was renamed von Struve Observatory. In 1974 the 1.5 metre telescope become operational. The name of the observatory was reverted to Tartu Observatory in 1995. In 1998, a 0.6 metre reflector and in 2013, a 0.3 metre modern robotic telescope were installed.

The old observatory building now mainly serves as a museum and is a part of a public science education centre.

Several notable scientists have been associated with the Tartu Observatory: Friedrich Georg Wilhelm von Struve, Johann Heinrich von Mädler, Thomas Clausen, Ernst Julius Öpik, Grigori Kuzmin, Jaan Einasto.

== Equipment ==
The observatory has three main telescopes. The 1.5 metre Cassegrain reflector, which is the largest optical telescope in Northern Europe, is used for spectroscopic observations. The second and third telescope are a 0.6 metre and 0.31 metre reflectors for photometric observations. There is also a pitch for a collection of meteorological instruments on the observatory grounds.

Tartu Observatory has also laboratories for accurate radiometric calibration for near-UV to shortwave infrared radiation; vacuum-, vibration-, temperature, and electromagnetic compatibility testing.

== See also ==
- List of astronomical observatories
- University of Tartu Old Observatory
