= Kolga, Tartu County =

Village in Estonia

Coordinates: 58°15′41″N 26°33′09″E

- Village
- Interactive map of Kolga, Tartu County
- Country: Estonia
- County: Tartu County
- Parish: Nõo Parish
- Time zone: UTC+2 (EET)
  - Summer (DST): UTC+3 (EEST)

Kolga is a village in Nõo Parish, Tartu County in eastern Estonia. It is located 103 mi or 167 km south-east of Tallinn.
