= Kääni =

Village in Estonia

Coordinates: 58°10′N 26°30′E

- Village
- Interactive map of Kääni
- Country: Estonia
- County: Tartu County
- Parish: Nõo Parish
- Time zone: UTC+2 (EET)
  - Summer (DST): UTC+3 (EEST)

Kääni is a village in Nõo Parish, Tartu County in eastern Estonia.
