= Lake Vissi =

Lake in Estonia

- Vissi järv (Estonian)
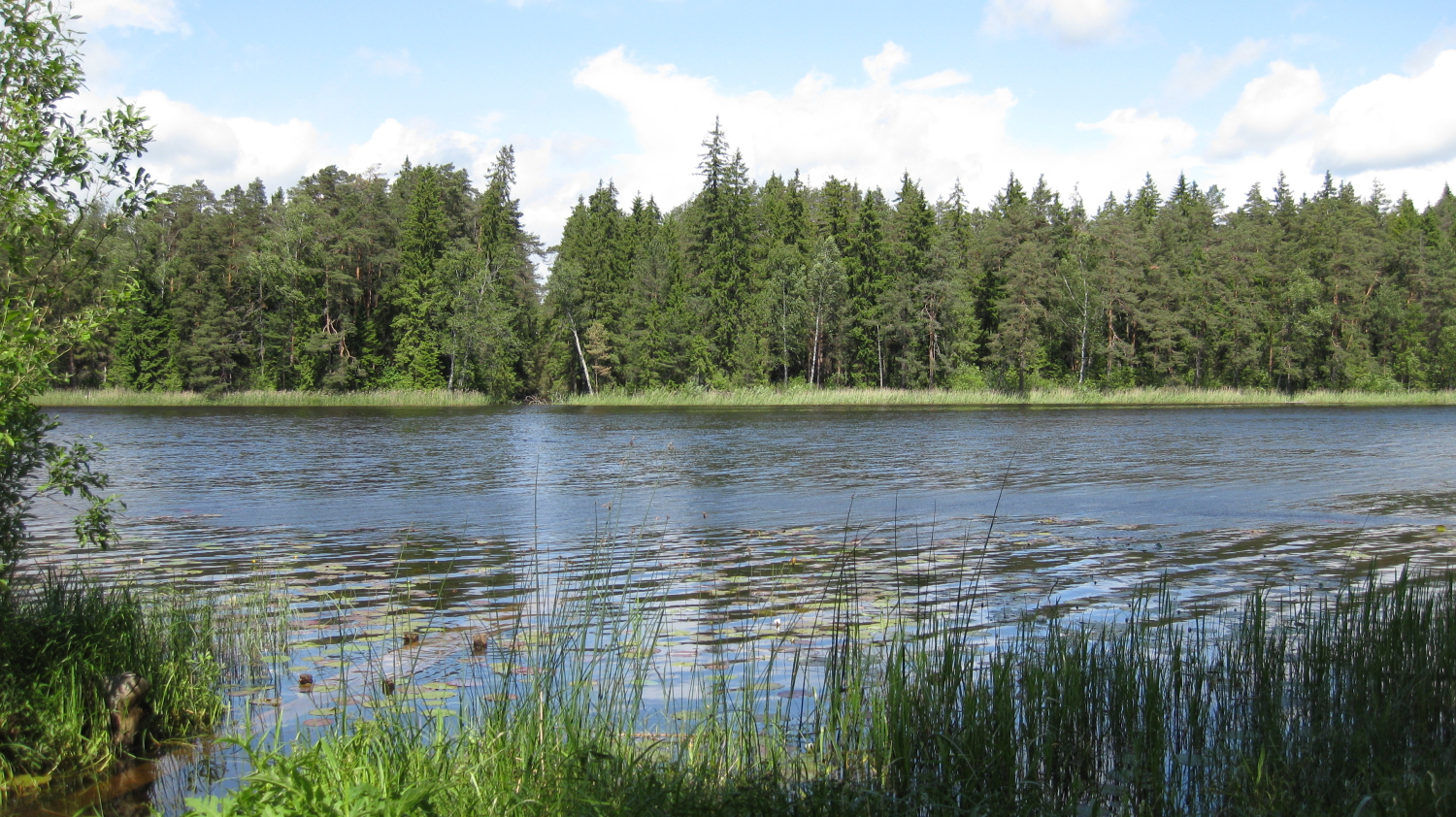

- Location within Estonia
- Location: Vissi, Tartu County, Estonia
- Coordinates: 58°15′24″N 26°26′0″E
- Basin countries: Estonia
- Max. length: 540 meters (1,770 ft)
- Max. width: 110 meters (360 ft)
- Surface area: 5.7 hectares (14 acres)
- Average depth: 2.5 meters (8 ft 2 in)
- Max. depth: 4.5 meters (15 ft)
- Water volume: 144,000 cubic meters (5,100,000 cu ft)
- Shore length^{1}: 1,410 meters (4,630 ft)
- Surface elevation: 34.7 meters (114 ft)
- ^{1} Shore length is not a well-defined measure.

Lake Vissi (Estonian: Vissi järv) is a lake in Estonia. It is located in the village of Vissi in Nõo Parish, Tartu County.

== Physical description ==
The lake has an area of 5.7 hectares (14 acres). The lake has an average depth of 2.5 meters (8 ft 2 in) and a maximum depth of 4.5 meters (15 ft). It is 540 meters (1,770 ft) long, and its shoreline measures 1,410 meters (4,630 ft). It has a volume of 144,000 cubic meters (5,100,000 cu ft).

== See also ==
- List of lakes of Estonia
