= Uuta =

Village in Estonia

Coordinates: 58°13′N 26°26′E

- Village
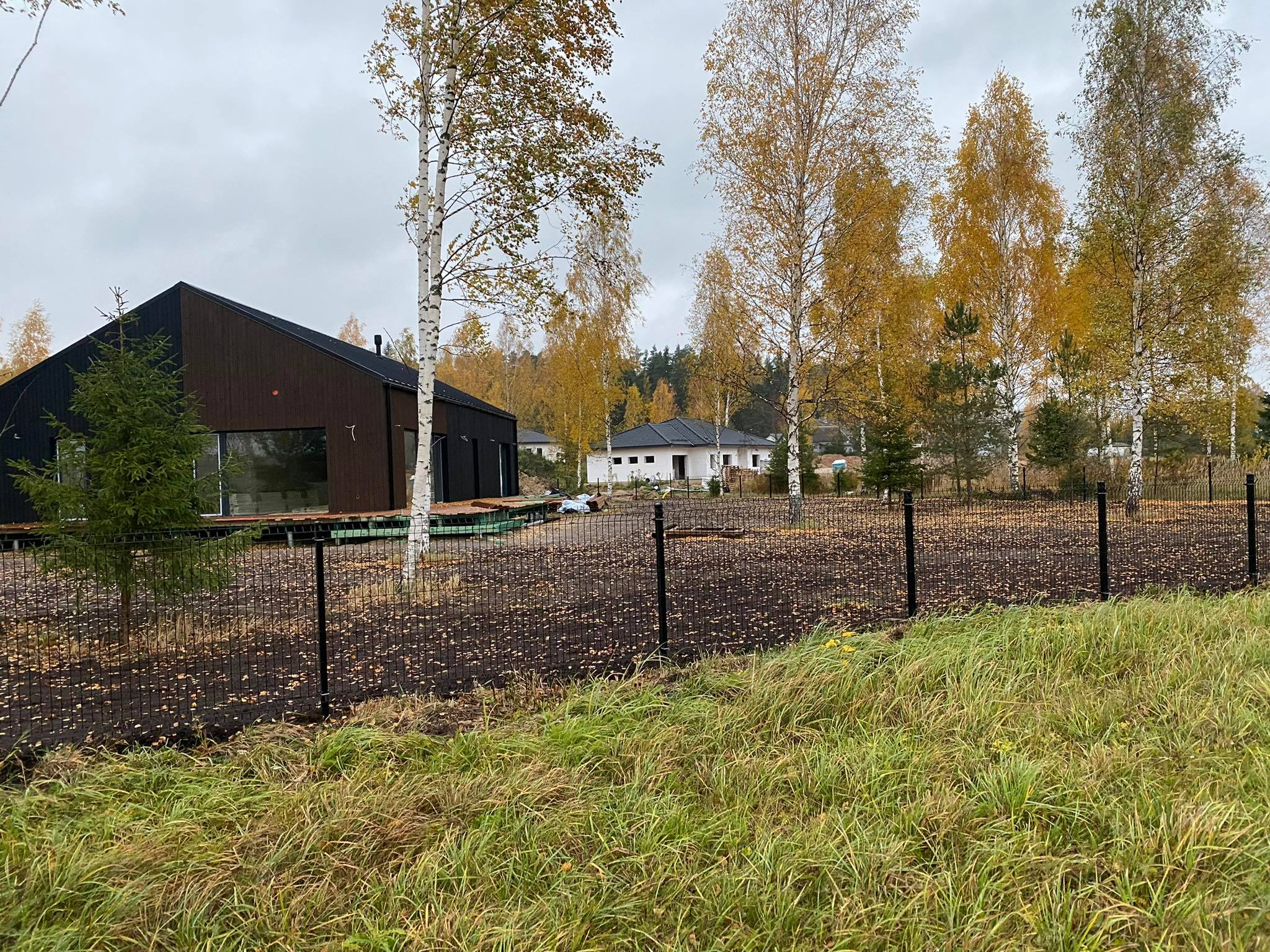
- Interactive map of Uuta
- Country: Estonia
- County: Tartu County
- Parish: Nõo Parish
- Time zone: UTC+2 (EET)
  - Summer (DST): UTC+3 (EEST)

Uuta is a village in Nõo Parish, Tartu County in eastern Estonia.
