= Grigori Kuzmin =

Estonian astronomer

Grigori Kuzmin (8 April 1917 – 22 April 1988) was an Estonian astronomer, who worked mainly in the field of stellar dynamics.

== Life and career ==
Grigori Kuzmin was born in 1917 in Viipuri, part of the Grand Duchy of Finland. His family was Russian. In 1924, they moved to Tallinn, Estonia, where Kuzmin attended school. Although his mother tongue was Russian, and he had learned to speak Finnish during childhood, after moving to Estonia, Estonian became his primary language. Kuzmin graduated cum laude from the University of Tartu in 1940.

== See also ==
- Tartu Observatory
