= Luke, Estonia =

Village in Estonia

Coordinates: 58°14′N 26°32′E

- Village
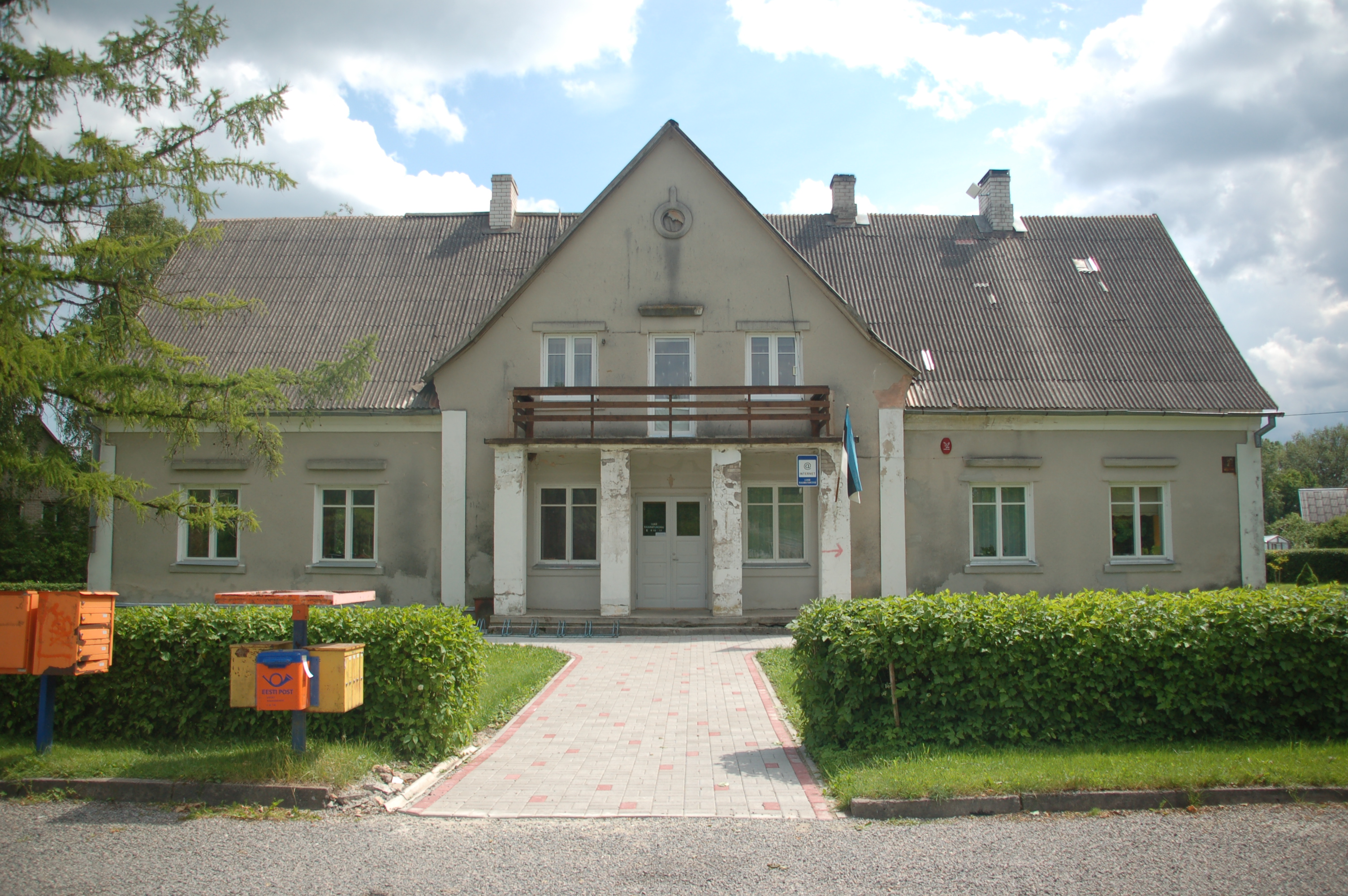
- Luke library
- Interactive map of Luke, Estonia
- Country: Estonia
- County: Tartu County
- Parish: Nõo Parish
- Time zone: UTC+2 (EET)
  - Summer (DST): UTC+3 (EEST)

Luke is a village in Nõo Parish, Tartu County, Estonia.

The Luke Manor is located in the village.
