= Estonian Volleyball Federation =

Sports governing body in Estonia

- Sport: Volleyball
- Abbreviation: EVF
- Founded: 1 June 1990

Official website
- www.volley.ee

Estonian Volleyball Federation (abbreviation EVF; Estonian: Eesti Võrkpalli Liit) is the governing body of volleyball in Estonia. It is a member of International Volleyball Federation (FIVB).

The EVF was established on 14 December 1923 as Estonian Handball Union (Estonian: Eesti Käsipalli Liit). During the Soviet occupation it operated under the name Estonian SSR Volleyball Federation (Estonian: Eesti NSV Võrkpalliföderatsioon). The EVF was re-established on 1 June 1990.
