= Vissi, Tartu County =

Village in Estonia

Coordinates: 58°14′46″N 26°26′43″E

Vissi
- Village
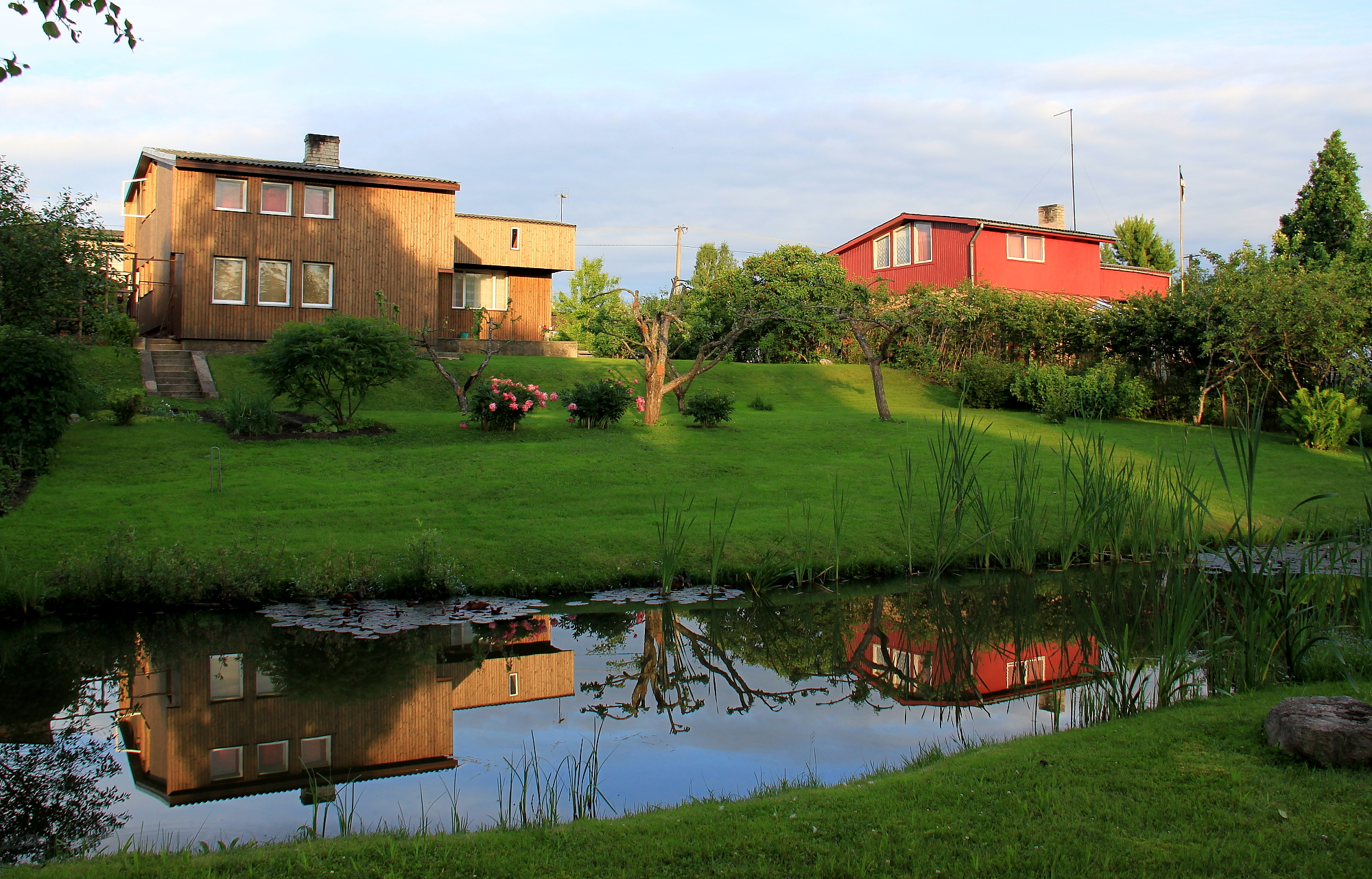
- Houses in Vissi.
- Interactive map of Vissi
- Country: Estonia
- County: Tartu County
- Parish: Nõo Parish
- Time zone: UTC+2 (EET)
  - Summer (DST): UTC+3 (EEST)

Vissi is a village in Nõo Parish, Tartu County in eastern Estonia. Lake Vissi is located in the village.
