= Ado Reinvald =

Estonian poet (1847–1922)

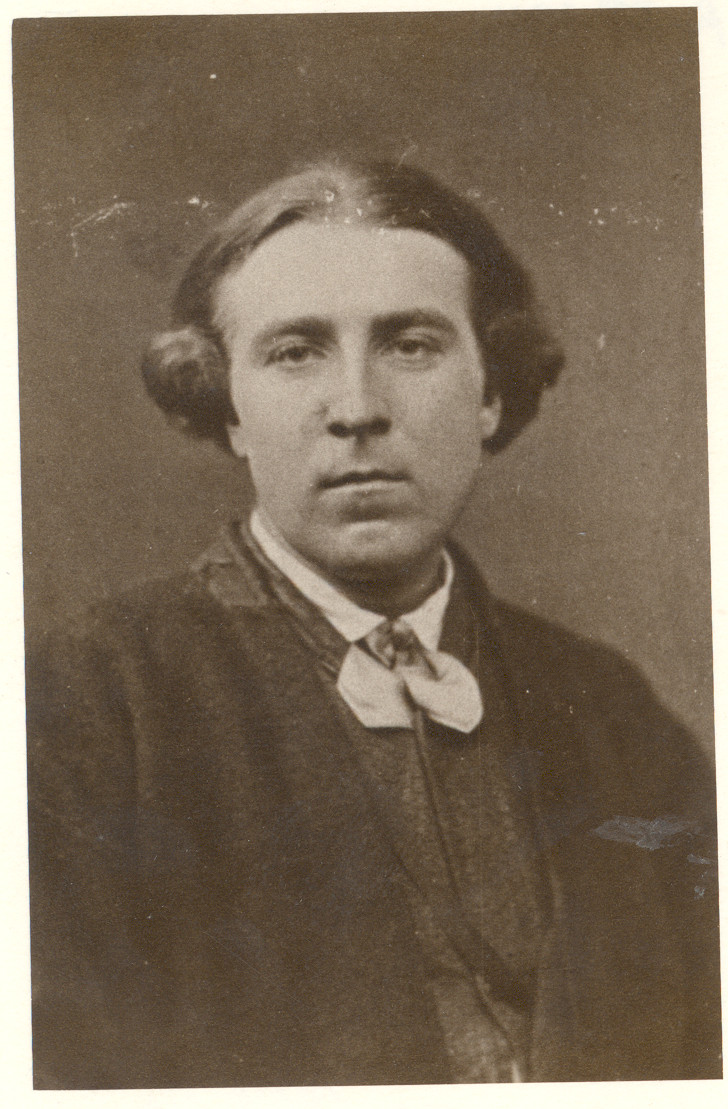
Ado Reinvald

Ado Reinvald (3 December 1847 Viljandi Parish, Viljandi County – 8 February 1922) was an Estonian poet.

He was the owner of Ilissa farm near Tarvastu, then in the Russian Empire. Because of the initiative of Reinvald, the farm was transformed into the local cultural centre. In 1894, the centre went bankrupt.

Reinvald died in 1922 and is buried at Raadi Cemetery in Tartu.

Several of Reinvald's poems have been set to music. The most notable is "Kuldrannake" ('Golden Strand'), music by Aleksander Läte.

== Works ==
- poetry collection "Villandi laulik" ('The Bard of Viljandi'; I 1872, II 1875, III 1877, IV 1889)
- poetry collection "Õitsi Ööpik" ('The Nightingale of Night Herd'; 1876)
- poetry collection "Nalja-Kannel ehk Laulurahe Baltlaste lilliaias" (I 1881, II 1883)
- humour book "Suur Naljahammas" ('The Great Joker'; 1903)
