= Laguja =

Village in Estonia

- Village
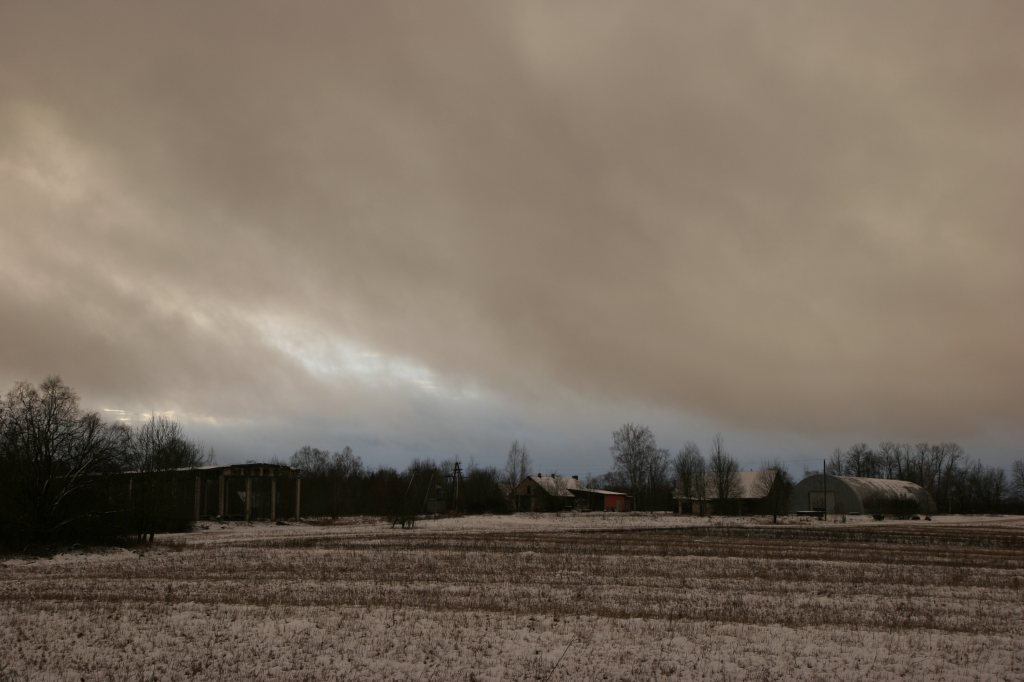

- Location within Estonia
- Coordinates: 58°10′N 26°27′E
- Country: Estonia
- County: Tartu County
- Parish: Nõo Parish
- Time zone: UTC+2 (EET)
  - Summer (DST): UTC+3 (EEST)

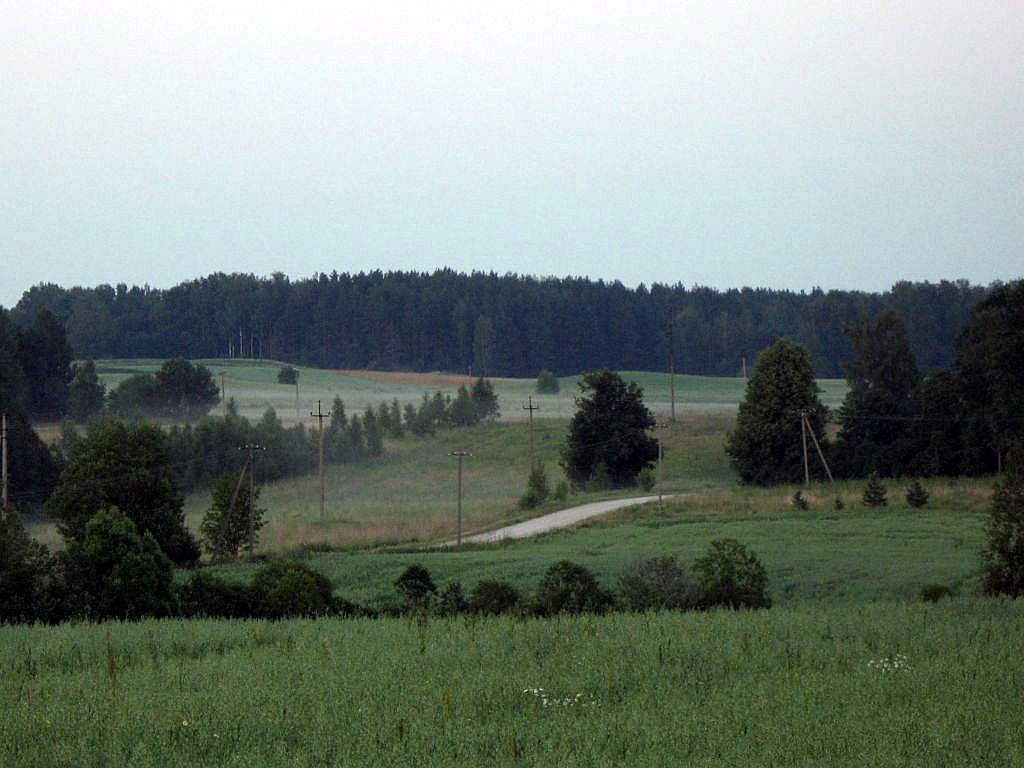
View to Laguja village

Laguja is a small village in Nõo Municipality, Tartu County, Estonia.

As of 1 January 2005, there were 33 residents and 16 active households in Laguja
