= Nõo Parish =

Municipality of Estonia

Coordinates: 58°16′32″N 26°32′15″E

Nõo Parish Nõo vald
- Municipality of Estonia
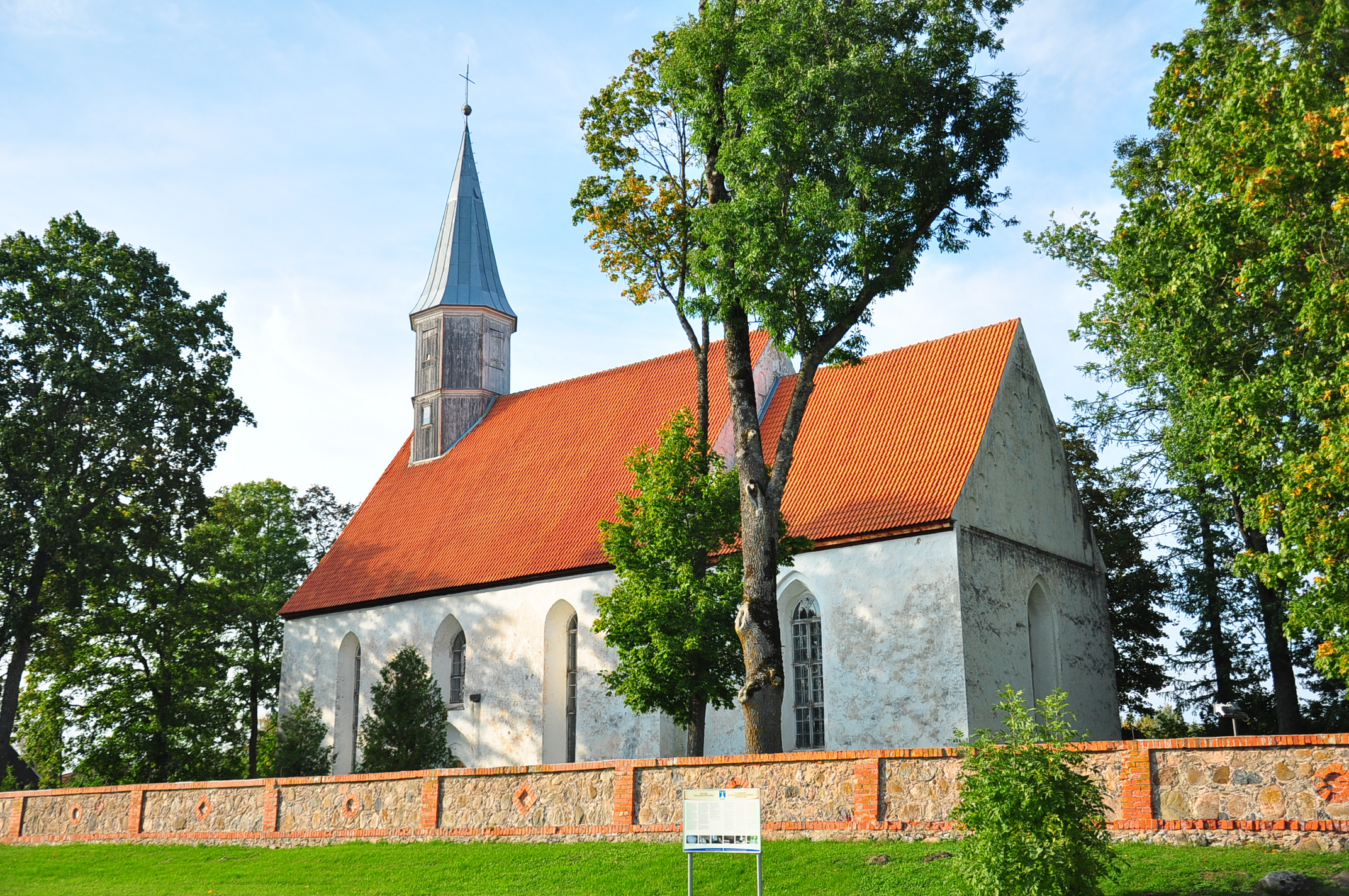
- Nõo church

- Flag Coat of arms

- Nõo Parish within Tartu County.
- Country: Estonia
- County: Tartu County
- Administrative centre: Nõo
- ISO 3166 code: EE-528
- Website: www.nvv.ee

Nõo Parish is a rural municipality in Tartu County, Estonia.

== Demographics ==
Small boroughs

Nõo - Tõravere

Villages

Aiamaa - Altmäe - Etsaste - Enno - Illi - Järiste - Kääni - Keeri - Ketneri - Kolga - Laguja - Luke - Meeri - Nõgiaru - Sassi - Tamsa - Unipiha - Uuta - Vissi - Voika

The largest group of people in the municipality who define themselves as religious are Lutherans, followed by Orthodox Christians. There are also other religious communities in the parish. Most of residents of the municipality are unaffiliated in terms of religion.

== Gallery ==
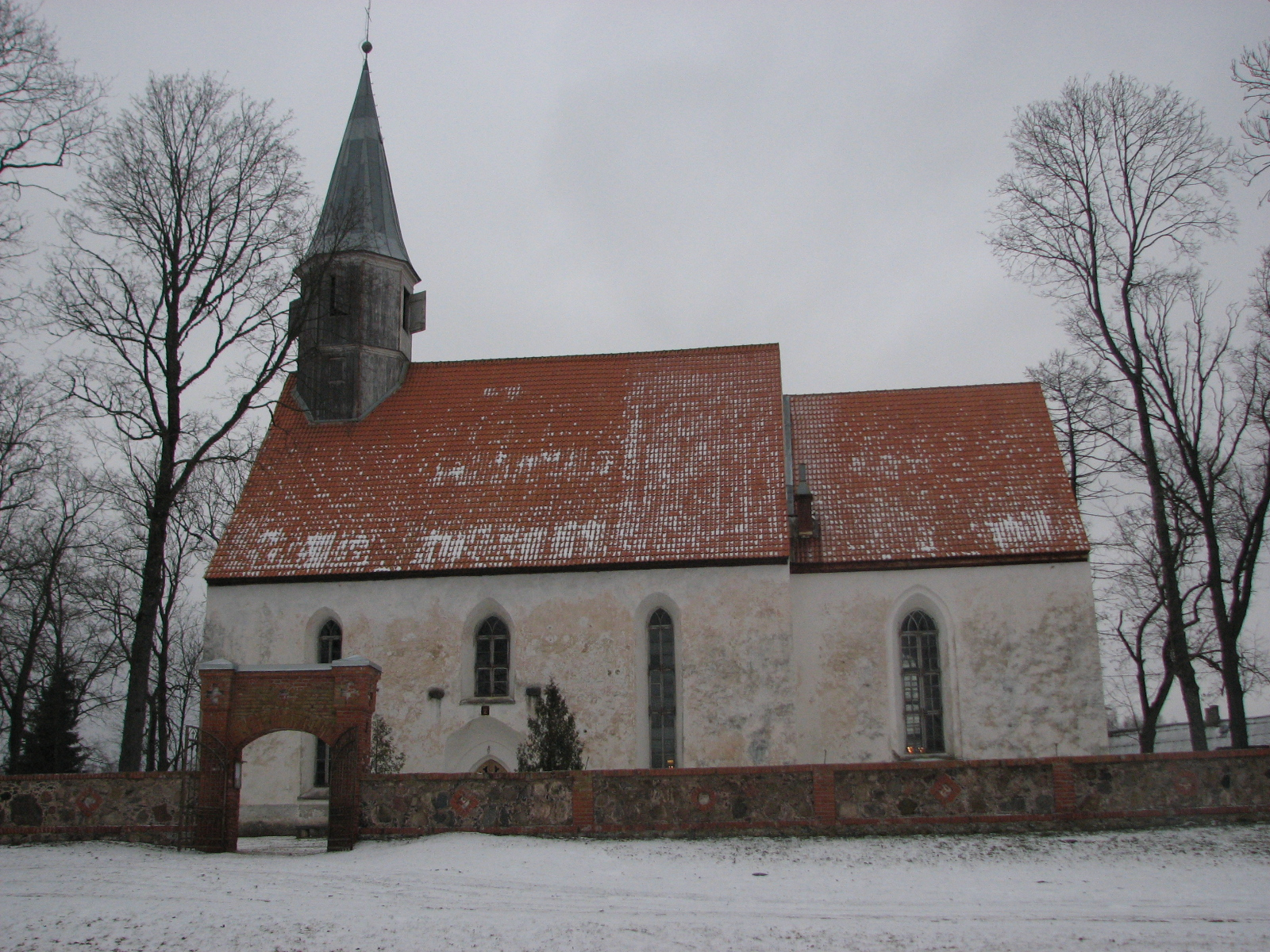
Nõo church

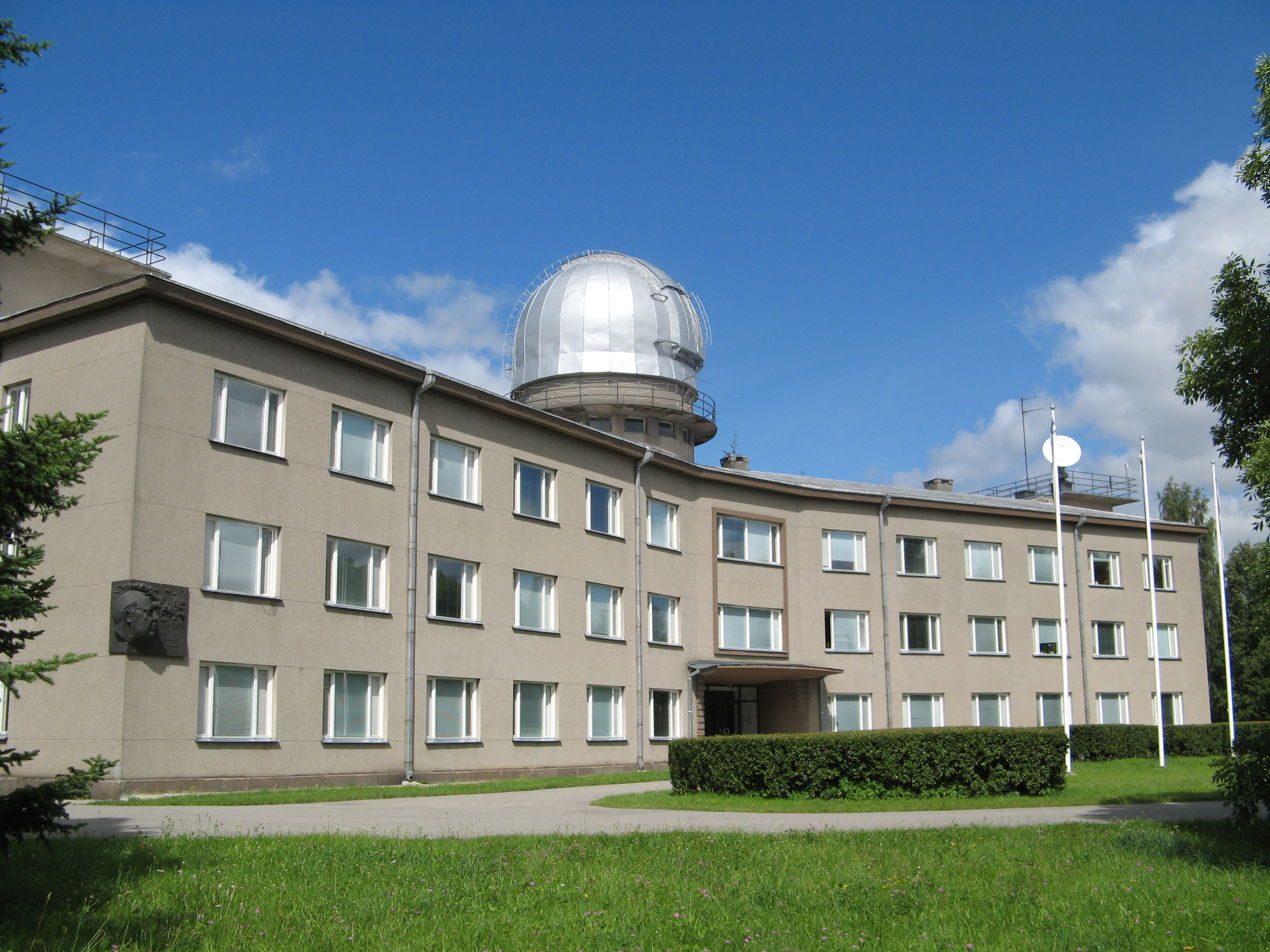
The Tartu Observatory in Tõravere.

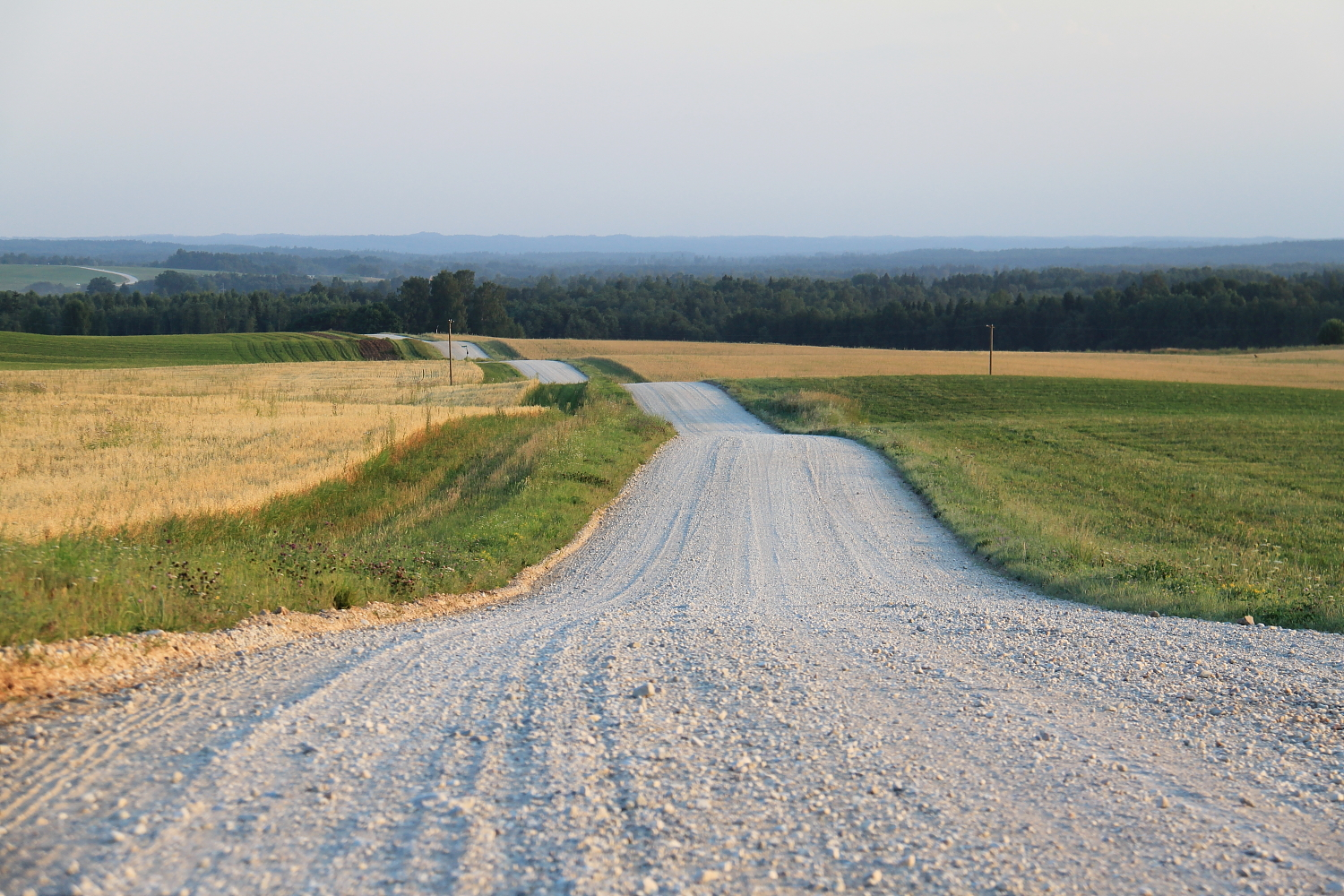
Road from Tamsa to Laguja.

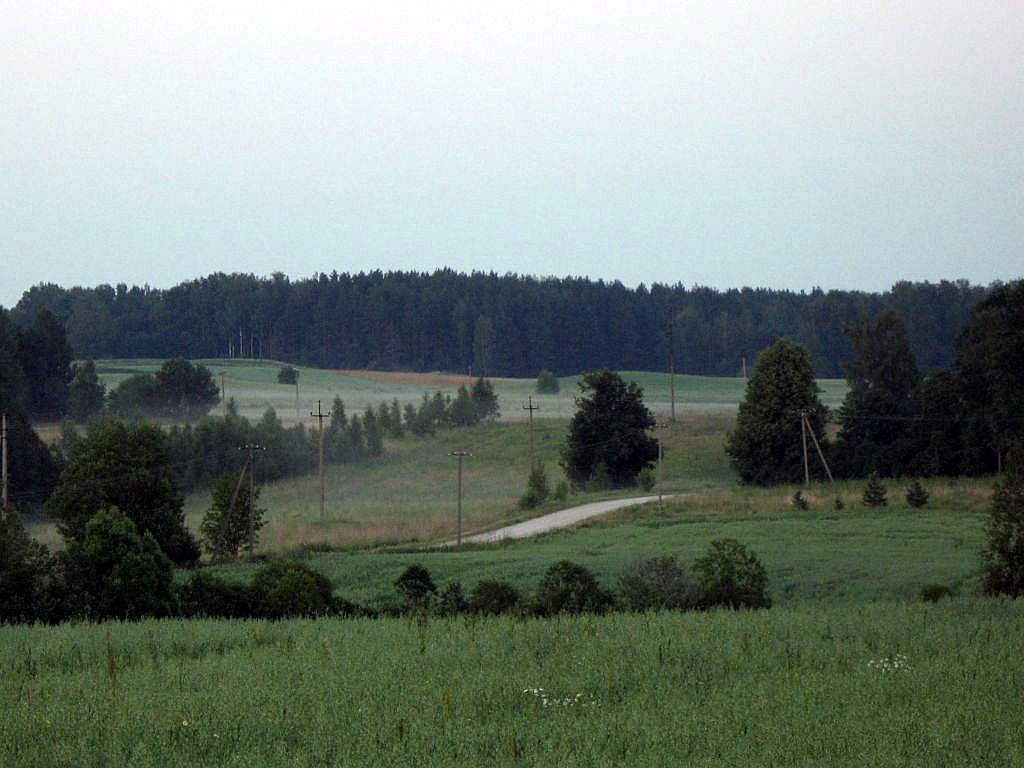
Landscape near Laguja

== Twinnings ==
Nõo Parish is twinned with:

- Liminka Municipality, Finland
- Viitasaari, Finland

== Notable people ==
- Helju Mikkel (1925 in Nõo – 2017), folk dancer and choreographer.
- Hannes Hanso (born 1971 in Nõo Parish), politician and diplomat, Mayor of Kuressaare, 2013-2015; Minister of Defence, 2015-2016
- Markus Jürgenson (born 1987 in Tõravere), footballer who played over 500 games and 11 for Estonia

== See also ==
- Tartu Observatory
- Luke Manor
