= Aleksander Läte =

Estonian composer and journalist (1860–1948)

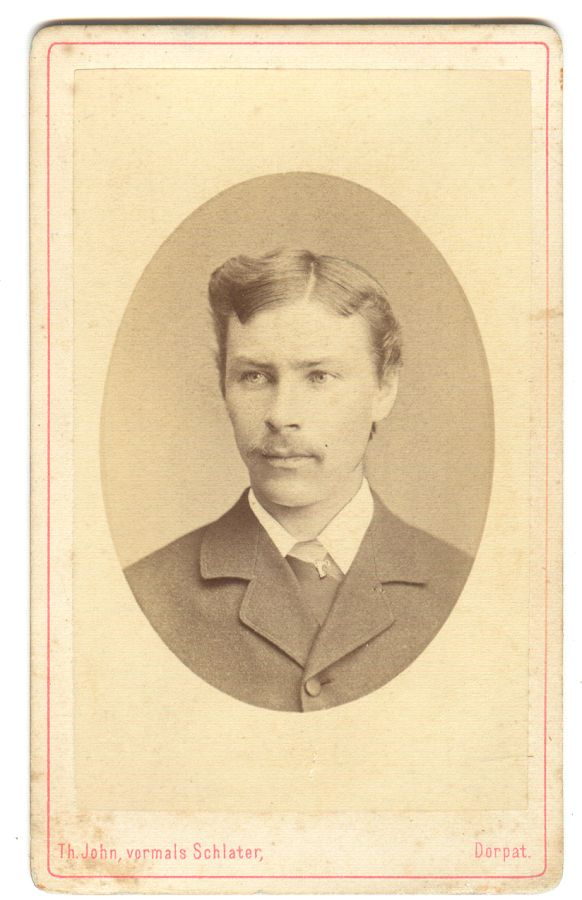
- Born: January 12, 1860; Pikasilla, Estonia
- Died: September 8, 1948 (88); Tartu, Estonia

Aleksander Läte (12 January 1860, in Pikasilla, Aakre Parish, Kreis Dorpat – 8 September 1948, in Tartu) was an Estonian composer, conductor and music critic. He is also known as the first Estonian professional music critic.

== Biography ==
In 1895, he started his education at Dresden Conservatory and graduated it in choir composition speciality. On the initiative of Läte, the first Estonian symphony orchestra was founded in 1900 in Tartu.

In 1900, Läte moved to Tartu, where there were more opportunities to practice music. In 1908, he was forced to withdraw from practical music work due to illness, but continued to work as a composer. In addition to composing, he wrote various scientific articles, was a music reviewer for Postimehe for a long time. Aleksander Läte can be considered the first Estonian professional music critic.

Since 1932, he led the piano factory Sprenk-Läte, located in Tartu. Since 1945, he was a member of Estonian Composers' Union.

He is buried in Rõngu cemetery . His grave is recognized as a cultural monument.

His brother was the piano master Eugen Sprenk-Läte (1871–1932), who ran the J. Moritz piano factory in Tartu, but was later a business manager. He founded his own piano workshop in Tartu in 1926, where he made pianos. Aleksander Läte continued his brother's work after his death.

== Works ==
- Five Cantatas
- Kalevala (overture) (1901)
- Eesti tants (for symphony orchestra, 1904)
- Tempo di mazurka (for symphony orchestra, 1904)
