= Otepää Landscape Conservation Area =

Protected area in Estonia

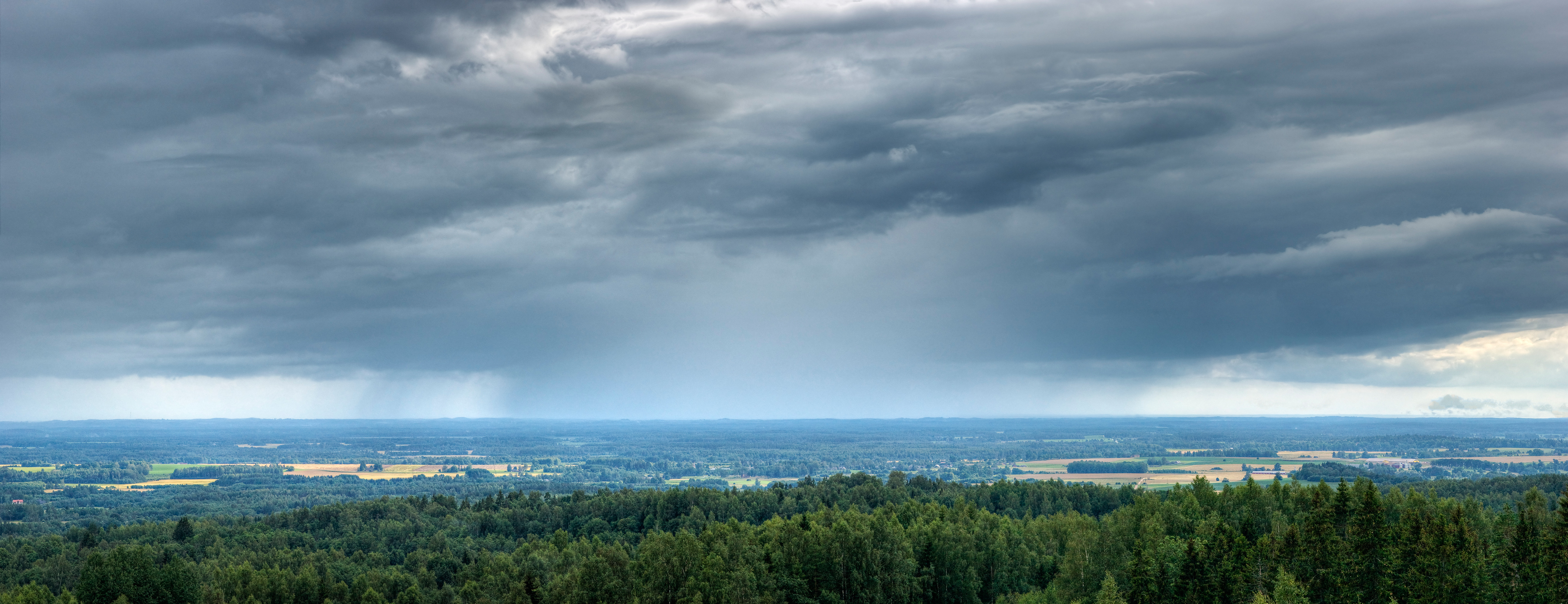

- Location within Estonia
- Location: Estonia
- Coordinates: 58°04′N 26°26′E
- Area: 22 209 ha

Otepää Landscape Conservation Area (or Otepää Nature Park) is a nature park situated in Valga County, Estonia.

Its area is 22 209 ha.
