= List of palindromic places =

A palindromic place is a city or town whose name can be read the same forwards or backwards. An example of this would be Navan in Ireland. Some of the entries on this list are only palindromic if the next administrative division they are a part of is also included in the name, such as Adaven, Nevada.

== Issues ==
Because the names here come from a variety of languages, several issues arise.

=== Unbalanced diacritics ===
Diacritics are marks placed on or near letters to give them a modified pronunciation. Some languages treat such as completely different letters; others treat them as variants of the base letter. The latter group is summarized here. Only place names where the language of the country is in the latter group are included here when diacritics make for an apparent non-palindrome.

=== Turkic vowels ===
Some Turkic languages (Turkish, Azerbaijan, Kazakh) have two or more vowels that resemble the I. They are differentiated by the number of dots above the letter: zero, one, or two. These dots appear on both lower and upper case letters. For places in Turkey, Azerbaijan, and Kazakhstan, only those vowels that have the same number of dots will be considered equal here.

=== ʻOkina in Polynesian languages ===
The ʻokina is a consonant found in several Polynesian languages. It is pronounced as a glottal stop and is often represented by an apostrophe when the correct character ʻ is not available. Because English wordplay generally ignores apostrophes, it is common to ignore ʻokinas in deciding whether a Polynesian name is a palindrome. However, this list does not follow that rule. Unbalanced ʻokinas will not be found in this list. However that rule has not been applied consistently to the Arabic hamza, which also represents a glottal stop.

=== False friend letters ===
Although the Latin alphabet's only mirror image pair of homographic false friend letters is the sans serif versions of capital I with lowercase ℓ—as in the name 𝖨𝗈𝗈𝗅 𝐼𝑜𝑜𝑙—in other writing systems, the standard Arabic abjad pair ا ʾalif and ل lām give reflection symmetry to the official UN name of sovereign nation ليبيا Libya.

== List ==
Palindromic place names in the Latin alphabet are:

=== 12 letters ===
- Adaven, Nevada, United States
- Adanac, Canada (Nipissing District, Ontario)
- Adanac, Canada (Parry Sound District, Ontario)
- Adanac, Canada (Saskatchewan)

=== 11 letters ===
- Ekalaka Lake, Ekalaka Montana, United States
- Wassamassaw, South Carolina, United States (with several variant spellings during the colonial era)

=== 10 letters ===
- Saxet, Texas (United States)

=== 9 letters ===
- Ellemelle, Belgium
- Kanakanak, Alaska, United States
- Kinikinik, Alberta, Canada
- Kinikinik, Colorado, United States
- Oktahatko, Florida, United States
- Paraparap, Victoria, Australia
- Arrawarra, New South Wales, Australia

=== 8 letters ===
- Burggrub, Germany
- Idappadi, Tamil Nadu, India
- Nari, Iran (Razavi Khorasan)
- Nari, Iran (Dul Rural District, Urmia County, West Azerbaijan)
- Nari, Iran (Silvaneh District, Urmia County, West Azerbaijan)

=== 7 letters ===
- Abiriba, Nigeria
- Acaiaca, Brazil
- Akasaka, Japan (Okayama)
- Akasaka, Japan (Tokyo)
- Alavala, Andhra Pradesh, India
- Aramara, Australia
- Ateleta, Italy (L'Aquila)
- Aworowa, Ghana
- Ebenebe, Anambra, Nigeria
- Etsaste, Estonia
- Glenelg, Highland, Scotland
- Glenelg, South Australia, Australia
- Glenelg, Nova Scotia, Canada
- Glenelg, Maryland, United States
- Hadidah, Syria
- Ikazaki, Ehime, Japan
- Itamati, Odisha, India
- Margram, West Bengal, India
- Noagaon, Bangladesh
- Neuquén, Argentina
- Okonoko, West Virginia, United States
- Planalp, Switzerland
- Qaanaaq, Greenland
- Senones, Vosges, France
- Ubulubu, Delta State, Nigeria
- Yatytay, Itapúa, Paraguay

=== 6 letters ===
- Aka Aka, New Zealand
- Aluula, Somalia (variant spelling of Alula, Somalia)
- Callac, Brittany, France
- Dörröd, Sweden
- Eleele, Hawaii, United States
- Haddah, Yemen
- Hajjah, Qalqilya, Palestinian Territories
- Hajjah, Yemen
- Hallah, Yemen
- Hammah, Lower Saxony, Germany
- Hannah, Georgia, United States
- Hannah, Michigan, United States
- Hannah, North Dakota, United States
- Hannah, South Carolina, United States
- Harrah, Oklahoma, United States
- Harrah, Washington, United States
- Hattah, Victoria, Australia
- Heddeh, Khuzestan, Iran
- Killik, Antalya, Turkey
- Lal Lal, Victoria, Australia
- Mussum, Bocholt, Germany
- Notton, West Yorkshire, England
- Renner, South Dakota, United States
- Renner, Texas, United States (former town, now a neighborhood of Dallas)
- Sarras, Ardèche, France
- Sarras, Kerman, Iran
- Selles, Eure, France
- Selles, Marne, France
- Selles, Pas-de-Calais, France
- Selles, Haute-Saône, France
- Semmes, Alabama, United States
- Sennes, South Tyrol, Italy
- Serres, Macedonia, Greece
- Serres, Aude, France
- Serres, Hautes-Alpes, France
- Serres, Meurthe-et-Moselle, France
- Staats, Saxony-Anhalt, Germany
- Tabbat, Bukan, West Azerbaijan, Iran
- Tabbat, Urmia, West Azerbaijan, Iran
- Tommot, Sakha Republic, Russia
- Woddow, Germany
- Vellev, Denmark
- Yessey, Krasnoyarsk Krai, Russia

=== 5 letters ===
- Aenea, Greece
- Akoka, Lagos, Nigeria
- Alula, Somalia
- Anina, Romania
- Apapa, Nigeria
- Apopa, El Salvador
- Asasa, Ethiopia
- Asosa, Ethiopia
- Ban Ab, Kerman, Iran
- Barab, Fars, Iran
- Basab, Yazd, Iran
- Capac, Michigan, United States
- Catac, Peru
- Civic, Australian Capital Territory, Australia
- Dūrūd, Lorestan, Iran
- Elele, Rivers State, Nigeria
- Elole, Senegal
- Gadag, Karnataka, India
- Garag, Karnataka, India
- Idudi, Uganda
- Izazi, Tanzania
- Kafak, Mazandaran, Iran
- Kahak, Delijan County, Markazi Province, Iran
- Kahak, Saveh County, Markazi Province, Iran
- Kahak, Qazvin Province, Iran
- Kahak, Qom, Iran
- Kahak, Razavi Khorasan Province, Iran
- Kahak, Semnan Province, Iran
- Kahak, South Khorasan Province, Iran
- Kalak, Gilan, Iran
- Kalak, Ramsar, Mazandaran, Iran
- Kamak, Kermanshah, Iran
- Kapak, Kurdistan, Iran
- Karak, Iran
- Karak, Malaysia
- Karak, Jordan
- Karak, Pakistan
- Karak, Iraq
- Kasak, Bulgaria
- Kasak, Turkey
- Kasak, East-Java, Indonesia
- Kasak, Middle-Java, Indonesia
- Kavak, Mersin, Turkey
- Kelek, Republic of Azerbaijan (variant of Kələk)
- Kesek, Kyrgyzstan
- Kınık, Izmir, Turkey
- Kırık, Kastamonu, Turkey
- Kivik, Sweden
- Kıyık, Kastamonu, Turkey
- Kızık, Akyurt, Ankara, Turkey
- Kızık, Gümüşhacıköy, Amasya, Turkey
- Kızık, Kızılcahamam, Ankara, Turkey
- Kızık, Sandıklı, Afyonkarahisar, Turkey
- Kodok, Western Nile, South Sudan
- Kuruk, Golestan, Iran
- Kuruk, Afghanistan
- Kuruk, Uzbekistan
- Kyzyk, Kazakhstan
- La Sal, Utah, United States
- Laval, Quebec, Canada
- Laval, France
- Level, Maryland, United States
- Level, Ohio, United States
- Lolol, Chile
- Magam, Jammu and Kashmir, India
- Maham, Haryana, India
- Majam, Rajasthan, India
- Matam, Conakry, Guinea
- Matam, Senegal
- Morom, Cambodia
- Muçum, Rio Grande do Sul, Brazil
- Mujum, Tajikistan
- Murum, Osmanabad, Maharashtra, India
- Murum, Pune, Maharashtra, India
- Murum, Sweden
- Mutum, Minas Gerais, Brazil
- Nan'an District, Chongqing, China
- Nan'an, Fujian China
- Naran, Govi-Altai, Mongolia
- Naran, Hormozgan, Iran
- Naran, Khyber Pakhtunkhwa, Pakistan
- Naran, Kerman, Iran
- Naran, Sükhbaatar, Mongolia
- Navan, Ireland
- Navan, Ontario, Canada
- Nawan, Punjab, Pakistan
- Nesen, Mazandaran, Iran
- Ni'lin, Palestinian Territories
- Nokon, New Ireland, Papua New Guinea
- Noxon, Montana, United States
- Noyon, France
- Noyon, Ömnögovi, Mongolia
- Onano, Italy
- Orero, Genoa, Liguria, Italy
- Oruro, Bolivia
- Ososo, Edo State, Nigeria
- Parap, Australia
- Polop, Alicante, Spain
- Qoroq, Golestan, Iran
- Qoroq, Lorestan, Iran
- Qoroq, Amol, Mazandaran, Iran
- Qoroq, Sari, Mazandaran, Iran
- Qoroq, Razavi Khorasan, Iran
- Qoroq, Yazd, Iran
- Quruq, West Azerbaijan, Iran
- Rapar, Gujarat, India
- Reber, Slovenia
- Reber, New York, United States
- Reger, Missouri, United States
- Reger, West Virginia, United States
- Remer, Minnesota, United States
- Sajas, France
- Salas, Spain
- Salas, Peru
- Salas, Peru
- Saras, Qazvin, Iran
- Seles, Cuanza Sul, Angola
- Senés, Almería, Spain
- Tizit, Nagaland, India
- Tumut, Australia
- Vokov, Czech Republic
- Wakaw, Saskatchewan, Canada
- Ziliz, Hungary

=== 4 letters ===
- Abba, Imo, Nigeria
- Abba, Georgia, United states
- Akka, Israel, variant spelling (transliteration from Arabic) of Acre, Israel
- Akka, Morocco
- Alla, California, United States
- Amma, Ilam, Iran
- Amma, West Virginia, United States
- Anna, Estonia
- Anna, Arkansas, United States
- Anna, Georgia, United States
- Anna, Illinois, United States
- Anna, Kentucky, United States
- Anna, Ohio, United States
- Anna, Texas, United States
- Anna, Fars, Iran
- Anna, Kohgiluyeh and Boyer-Ahmad, Iran
- Anna, Voronezh Oblast, Russia
- Anna, Valencia, Spain
- Arra, Puruliya, West Bengal, India
- Arra, Paschim Bardhaman, West Bengal, India
- Arra, Punjab, Pakistan
- Assa, Assa-Zag, Morocco
- Atta, Jalandhar, Punjab, India
- Ayya, Kapurthala, Punjab, India
- 'Azza, Palestinian Territories (refugee camp)
- Edde, Hungary
- Edde, Lebanon
- Egge, Buskerud, Norway
- Egge, Innlandet, Norway
- Egge, Sogn og Fjordane, Norway
- Elle, Central African Republic
- Elle, Italy
- Essé, Brittany, France
- Esse, Charente, France
- Esse, Cameroon
- Esse, Pedersöre, Western Finland, Finland
- Illi, Armenia
- Illi, Tartu County, Estonia
- Illi, Võru County, Estonia
- Illi, Iran
- Irri, Delta, Nigeria
- Kuuk, Greenland
- Leel, Nakodar, Jalandhar, Punjab, India
- Maam, Ireland
- Na'an, Israel
- Noon, Washington, United States
- Ollo, Navarre, Spain
- Orro, Bihar, India
- Otto, Indiana, United States
- Otto, New York, United States
- Otto, North Carolina, United States
- Otto, West Virginia, United States
- Otto, Wyoming, United States
- Sées, Orne, France

=== 3 letters ===
- Aba, Hungary
- Aba, Abia, Nigeria
- Aba, Okayama, Japan
- Aba, Haut Uele, Democratic Republic of the Congo
- Aba, Sichuan, China
- Ada, Alabama, United States
- Ada, Kansas, United States
- Ada, Minnesota, United States
- Ada, Ohio, United States
- Ada, Oklahoma, United States
- Ada, Oregon, United States
- Ada, West Virginia, United States
- Ada, Wisconsin, United States
- Ada, Serbia
- Ada, Croatia
- Ada, Karaman, Turkey
- Ada, Osun, Nigeria
- Afa, Corsica, France
- Aga, Dakahlia Governate, Egypt
- Aga, Niigata, Japan
- Aia, Basque Country
- Aka, Hungary
- Aka, Fukuoka, Japan
- Aka, Khuzestan, Iran
- Ala, Hiiu County, Estonia
- Ala, Valga County, Estonia
- Ala, Kerala, India
- Ala, Semnan, Iran
- Ala, Trentino, Italy
- Ala, Gotland, Sweden
- Ama, Belgium
- Ama, Estonia
- Ama, Ilam, Iran
- Ama, Tuscany, Italy
- Ama, Aichi, Japan
- Ama, Shimane, Japan
- Ama, Louisiana, United States
- Ana, Iraq
- Apa, Satu Mare County, Romania
- Aqa, Kermansha, Iran
- Aqa, Lorestan, Iran
- Ara, Jharkhand, India
- Ara, Jharkhand, India
- Ara, Mazandaran, Iran
- 'Ara, Israel
- Aua, American Samoa
- Aua, Neuenstein, Hesse, Germany
- Ava, Gilan Province, Iran
- Ava, North Khorasan Province, Iran
- Ava, New Zealand
- Ava, Alabama, United States
- Ava, Arkansas, United States
- Ava, Illinois, United States
- Ava, Missouri, United States
- Ava, New York, United States
- Ava, Ohio, United States
- Awa, Tokoshima, Japan
- Aya, Miyazaki, Japan
- Aza, Nakhchivan, Azerbaijan.
- Báb, Nitra District, Slovakia
- Béb, Hungary
- Dad, Hungary
- Dad, Wyoming, United States
- Ede, Gelderland, Netherlands
- Ede, Osun, Nigeria
- Ege, Indiana, United States
- Eke, Gotland, Sweden
- Epe, North Rhine-Westphalia, Germany
- Epe, Netherlands
- Epe, Lagos, Nigeria
- Ete, Hungary
- Eve, Oise, France
- Eve, Kentucky, United States
- Eve, Missouri, United States
- Eye, Cambridgeshire, England
- Eye, Herefordshire, England
- Eye, Suffolk, England
- Èze, France
- Fef, West Papua, Indonesia
- Gug, Aalborg, Denmark
- Gug, India
- Ibi, Burkina Faso
- Ibi, Nigeria
- Ibi, Spain
- Idi, Indonesia
- Iji, Japan
- Iji, Nigeria
- Iki, Nagasaki, Japan
- Ili, China
- Ini, Gilan, Iran
- Ini, Crete, Greece
- Ini, Nigeria
- İsi, Azerbaijan
- Izi, North Khorasan, Iran
- Izi, Razavi Khorasan, Iran
- Jaj, Lebanon
- Kak, Cambodia
- Kék, Hungary
- Kik, Croatia
- Krk, Croatia
- Kuk, Bosnia and Herzegovina
- Kuk, Slovenia
- Lel, Alicante, Spain
- Lel, Perm Krai, Russia
- Lol, Dordogne, Aquitaine, France
- Lul, Upper Nile, South Sudan
- Mem, Sweden
- Mim, Ghana
- Mum, Kachin State, Burma
- Nan, Thailand
- Nan, China
- Nin, Croatia
- Obo, Central African Republic
- Oco, Navarre, Spain
- Ogo, Diourbel, Senegal
- Ogo, Louga, Senegal
- Ojo, Lagos, Nigeria
- Oko, Warmian-Masurian Voivodeship, Poland
- Olo, Western Equatoria, South Sudan
- Ono, Ivory Coast
- Ono, Fukushima, Japan
- Ono, Hyōgo, Japan
- Ono, California, United States
- Ono, Kentucky, United States
- Ono, Pennsylvania, United States
- Ono, Wisconsin, United States
- Oro, Estonia
- Örö, Finland
- Oso, Washington, United States
- Oto, Aragon, Spain
- Ōtō, Fukuoka, Japan
- Oto, Iowa, United States
- Oto, Missouri, United States
- Ouo, Burkina Faso
- Owo, Ondo, Nigeria
- Oyo, Republic of the Congo
- Oyo, Nigeria
- Pap, Hungary
- Pap, Namangan Region, Uzbekistan
- Pep, New Mexico, United States
- Pep, Texas, United States
- Šaš, Croatia
- Sis, Armenia
- Sis, Azerbaijan
- Sis, East Azerbaijan, Iran
- Sis, Kurdistan, Iran
- Sos, Nagorno-Karabakh
- Sos, Lot-et-Garonne, France
- Sus, Azerbaijan
- Sus, Qazvin, Iran
- Sus, Pune, India
- Sus, Pyrénées-Atlantiques, France
- Tát, Hungary
- Tét, Hungary
- Tit, Adrar, Algeria
- Tit, Tamanrasset, Algeria
- Tut, Lorestan, Iran
- Tut, Markazi, Iran
- Tut, Razavi Khorasan, Iran
- Tut, South Khorasan, Iran
- Tut, Yazd, Iran
- Ubu, Nepal
- Udu, Dalta, Nigeria
- Udu, Sagaing, Burma
- Ugu, Uttar Pradesh, India
- Uku, Estonia
- Uku, Nepal
- Ulu, North Khorasan, Iran
- Ulu, Sakha Republic, Russia
- Uru, São Paulo, Brazil
- Utu, Estonia
- Vav, Gujarat, India
- Vīv, Ardabil, Iran
- Vov, Azerbaijan
- Waw, Bago, Burma

=== 2 letters ===
- Aa, Estonia
- Aa, Indonesia
- Ee, Cook Islands
- Ee, Netherlands
- Ii, Finland
- Oo, Indonesia

=== 1 letter ===
See List of short place names#One-letter place names. These are arguably not a palindrome, or perhaps a degenerate palindrome.

== Palindromes that include abbreviations ==
Some place names make a palindrome when they include the abbreviation of the state or province they are in.

=== 8 letters ===
- Apollo PA (Pennsylvania, United States)

=== 7 letters ===
- Omaha MO (Missouri, United States)

=== 6 letters ===
- Linn IL (variant name of Orio, Illinois, United States)

=== 5 letters ===
- Lis IL (Illinois, United States)
- Roy OR (Oregon, United States)

== See also ==
- Palindrome
- Anagram
- Palindroma
- List of geographic anagrams and ananyms

== Sources ==
- GotoEuro Information
- City Name Database (at nona.net)
- I Love Me, Vol. I, Palindrome Encyclopedia, Michael Donner, Algonquin Books of Chapel Hill, 1996
- Geographic Names Information Service
- Canadian Geographic Names Data base
- store/MapMarker
