= Illi =

Illi may refer to:

== Arts, entertainment, and media ==
- illi (album), studio album by Taiwanese singer Wilber Pan

== People ==
- Aleksander Illi (1912–2000), Estonian basketball player
- Nora Illi (1984–2020), Swiss Islamic preacher
- Illi Gardner (born 1999), British racing cyclist

== Places ==
- Illi, Armenia, a settlement in Shirak Province, Armenia
- Illi, Tartu County, a village in Tartu County, Estonia
  - Illi Lake
- Illi, Võru County, a village in Võru County, Estonia
- Illi, Iran, a village in East Azerbaijan Province, Iran

== See also ==
- Mont Illi, a department of Mayo-Kebbi Est, Chad
- Ili (disambiguation)
- Illy (disambiguation)
