= Beaufort, Haute-Garonne =

Beaufort
- Commune
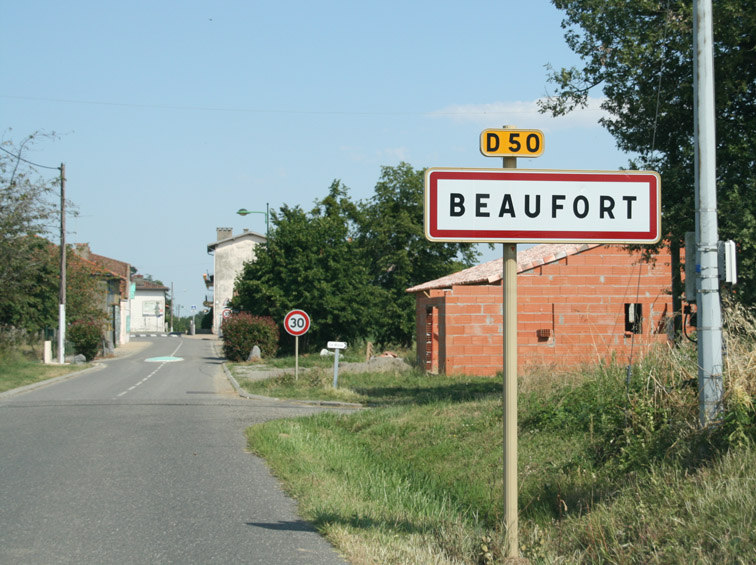
- The road into Beaufort

- Coat of arms
- Location of Beaufort
- Location within France Location within Occitanie
- Coordinates: 43°27′34″N 1°06′44″E
- Country: France
- Region: Occitania
- Department: Haute-Garonne
- Arrondissement: Muret
- Canton: Cazères

Government
  - Mayor (2020–2026): Daniel Parédé
- Area^{1}: 8.51 km^{2} (3.29 sq mi)
- Elevation: 280 m (920 ft)
- Highest elevation: 323 m (1,060 ft)
- Lowest elevation: 236 m (774 ft)
- Population (2023): 475
  - Density: 55.8/km^{2} (145/sq mi)
- Time zone: UTC+01:00 (CET)
  - Summer (DST): UTC+02:00 (CEST)
- INSEE/Postal code: 31051 /31370
- ^{1} French Land Register data, which excludes lakes, ponds, glaciers > 1 km^{2} (0.386 sq mi or 247 acres) and river estuaries.

Beaufort (French pronunciation: [bofɔʁ]; Occitan: Bèuhòrt) is a village and commune in the Haute-Garonne department in southwestern France.

== Geography ==
The commune is bordered by four other communes: Sainte-Foy-de-Peyrolières to the northeast, Rieumes to the south, Montgras to the southwest, and finally by Sabonnères to the west.

== Population ==
Historical population
Year	Pop.	±% p.a.
1968	125	—
1975	142	+1.84%
1982	140	−0.20%
1990	147	+0.61%
1999	247	+5.94%
2007	356	+4.68%
2012	347	−0.51%
2017	462	+5.89%
2023	475	+0.46%
Source: INSEE

== See also ==
- Communes of the Haute-Garonne department
