= Alexander Karászi =

Hungarian nobleman

Alexander (I) Karászi
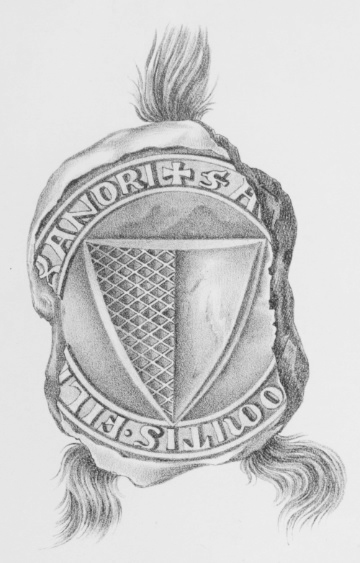
- Seal of Alexander Karászi (1272)

Judge royal
- Reign: 1272–1273
- Predecessor: Denis Péc
- Successor: Ladislaus Kán
- Died: 1274/76
- Noble family: House of Karászi (Edelényi)
- Spouses: 1, unidentified 2, unidentified
- Issue: (1) Alexander II (1) John I (1) a daughter
- Father: Drugh

Alexander (I) Karászi (Hungarian: Karászi (I.) Sándor; died 1274/76) was a Hungarian military leader and baron in the second half of the 13th century. He was a faithful confidant of Younger King Stephen in the 1260s. In this capacity, he played an active role in the civil war between Stephen and his father King Béla IV of Hungary. He served as Ban of Severin from around 1265/1266 to 1268. He was Judge royal between 1272 and 1273, during the reign of Ladislaus IV of Hungary. He was the forefather of the Karászi (then Edelényi) noble family, which acquired possessions in Northeast Hungary, primarily in Szabolcs and Szatmár counties.

== Early career ==
Alexander was the son of a certain Drugh (also Drug or Dorog). Historian Mór Wertner considered that he belonged to the gens (clan) Gutkeled. According to two charters of Duke Stephen (1267 and 1268, the text of the former was preserved only by a summary in a 14th-century charter), Alexander had served him since the youth of the prince (later king). Initially, Alexander served as a familiaris of a powerful lord Ernye Ákos.

Chronologically, he first appeared in contemporary records when, under the banner of Duke Stephen, participated in the royal campaign in the summer of 1253, when King Béla IV launched a war against Ottokar II in Moravia and laid siege to Olomouc. Alexander received five wounds during the siege. He was also present in the Battle of Kressenbrunn on 12 June 1260, when the Bohemian troops routed the Hungarian army and Béla was forced to renounce Styria in favor of Ottokar. Stephen's charter says the Alexander fought "gloriously" in the battle and "remained on his feet" during the clashes, protecting the duke when the vanguard army that Stephen led was surrounded by the Bohemians. When Stephen was made Duke of Transylvania in 1260, Alexander escorted his lord to the province. He fought against the Byzantine Empire with his own army corps in 1263, when Duke Stephen sent reinforcements under the command of Ladislaus Kán to Bulgaria to provide assistance to Despot Jacob Svetoslav.

== In the service of Duke Stephen ==
The tense relationship between Béla IV and Stephen – who adopted the title of "younger king" and ruled the eastern part of Hungary – sparked into a civil war at the end of 1264. Around 10 December, brothers Ladislaus and Julius Kán, who defected to the senior king shortly before, invaded Duke Stephen's realm along the valley of Maros (Mureș) river and occupied contiguous lands in southern Transylvania despite the failed efforts of Alexander to regain these territories. Although Stephen defeated the army of the Kán brothers, the simultaneous attack of his province in Northeast Hungary forced him to retreat as far as the castle at Feketehalom (Codlea, Romania) in the easternmost corner of Transylvania. According to Stephen's charter from 1268, Alexander "left behind his parents, sons, brothers, all of his assets and goods" and joined the weakened retreating army. He was among the few defenders during the siege of Feketehalom, when the advancing royal army of Béla under the command of Lawrence, son of Kemény began to besiege the fort in the last days of December 1264. The fortress was first attacked by an army vanguard led by Conrad, brother of Lawrence, who tried to break through the castle gate with a rapid advance, but Alexander and his soldiers prevented this. Subsequently, Alexander and his men guarded the stone walls "day and night". After the arrival of the rescue army, Stephen led his remaining garrison out of the fort. Béla's army was heavily defeated, Alexander captured altogether 18 "notable knights", whom he brought before the king "like cattle or calves". Stephen rewarded him with a shield of one of his defeated enemies. Alexander also participated in the Battle of Isaszeg in early March 1265, where acted as a bodyguard of Stephen on his right, protecting the younger king from the attackers. Alexander's involvement in the civil war and loyalty to Duke Stephen served as a point of reference in the judicial court of Dowager Queen Elizabeth of Poland almost a century later – in 1353 – concerning the estates of the extinct Edelényi (Karászi) family which returned to the Crown, that already their ancestor Alexander should have been deprived of all his possessions as a result of his rebellion against the rightful ruler Béla IV, so that all their possessions of his descendants, the Edelényis, who died without male descendants, were already illegal.

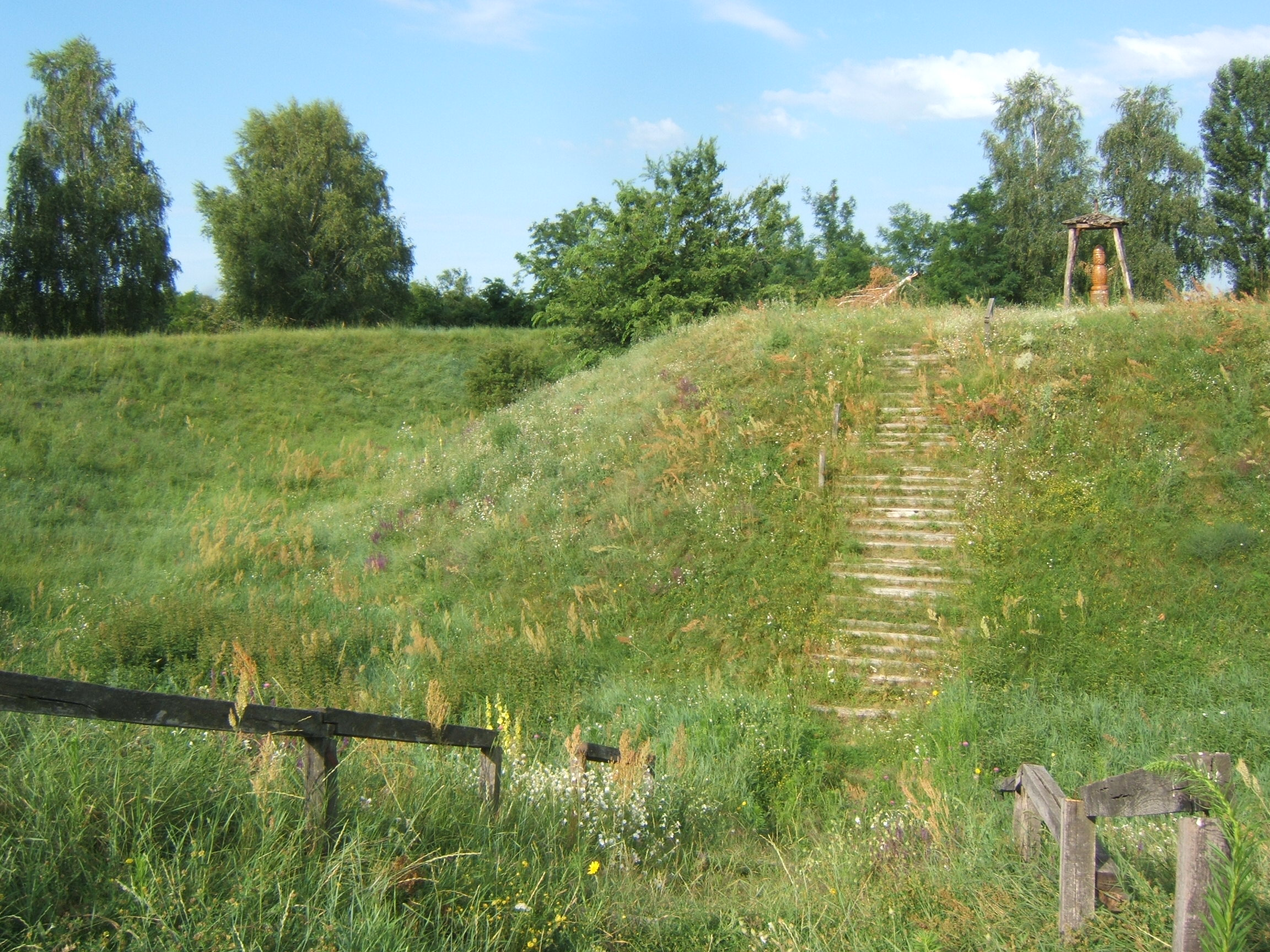
The earth ramparts of castle in Nyírkarász, built by Alexander Karászi around the 1260s

Following the civil war and the reconciliation between Béla and Stephen, Alexander served as ispán of Szabolcs County between 1267 and 1268. After the restoration of the Hungarian rule over the Banate of Severin (Szörény) following Stephen's successful Bulgarian campaigns, Alexander was styled as ban of the province in 1268, but he was replaced by Ugrin Csák in this dignity already in the same year.

For his loyal service and military merits, Alexander was granted the villages Kazinc (today a borough of Kazincbarcika), Ludna and Harica in Borsod County by Younger King Stephen in 1267. According to the donation letter, Ernye Ákos already donated these settlements to his familiaris Alexander sometime before 1265, and the duke only confirmed and approved this donation with this document. In the next year (1268), Alexander again received a donation from his monarch. He was granted Malka in Szatmár County (which was once owned by his father), Gesztely in Zemplén County and Olán (laid near Edelény) in Borsod County. After his appointment as Ban of Severin still in that year, Alexander was granted additional possessions in Szatmár County from Duke Stephen: Vasvári, Szalka (today Mátészalka), Szentmárton and Kak (today Mărtinești and Cucu, respectively, parts of commune Odoreu, Romania), while he already owned the village Solymos in the county. Courtesy of Stephen, Alexander also became the owner of Demecser (which he had once possessed but was then confiscated from him) and Kék in Szabolcs County. Around the same time, he was also granted Bajul (today a borough of Pátroha) and Nyírkarász in the county. In the latter place, he built a motte-and-bailey castle, which became his permanent residence and his descendants were called with the surname "Karászi" for a while thereafter.

== During the feudal anarchy ==
Despite his loyalty and military participation, there is no record that Alexander held any position after Stephen V ascended the Hungarian throne in 1270. He returned to the elite only during the era of feudal anarchy, when various baronial groups fought for the supreme power during the nominal rule of the minor Ladislaus IV of Hungary. As a confidant of Dowager Queen Elizabeth the Cuman, Alexander served as Judge royal and ispán of Vrbas (or Orbász) County from September 1272 to March 1273. According to historian Attila Zsoldos, the creation of the new institutions of provincial jurisdiction, namely the "noble judges" (judices nobilium) occurred during the term of Alexander against the power aspirations of Queen Elizabeth. The first noble judges appeared in Vrbas County in Slavonia, where Alexander functioned as ispán beside his court dignity. Alexander was dismissed as Judge royal and ispán of Vrbas County by Ladislaus Kán and Lawrence, son of Kemény, respectively, when Elizabeth attempted a self-coup during Ottokar's invasion of Hungary in the spring of 1273.

During the feudal anarchy and civil war period between 1272 and 1277, Alexander supported the Csák baronial group. He was referred to as ispán of Doboka and Szeben counties in 1274. He acted as co-judge beside Matthew Csák, Voivode of Transylvania in November 1274, as one of the influential members of the local elite, after his transfer to the voivode's entourage. In an undated charter, Ladislaus IV referred to him as "Alexander banus de Kazna". Mór Wertner considered this is a result of the notary's typographical error and "Kazna" refers to Karász and the title "ban" reflects his former dignity in Severin. There were other assumptions that Alexander was a titular ban of a – by now – unidentified place "Kazna". In this donation letter, Ladislaus IV donated the uninhabited land of Pap in Szabolcs County. Alexander acquired the estates Vajk and Malonta in Tolna County on an exchange transaction in 1274. In the same year, he bequeathed his acquired landholdings Isaszeg, Kerepes and Megyer (today Káposztásmegyer, a borough of Újpest) in Pest County, and Bakta, Buda and Szentjakab in Heves County to his second wife with royal permission, also allowing her to give the estates to her son or daughters who were born from her first marriage.

Alexander married twice. Two sons and a daughter were born from his first marriage. Alexander (II) first appeared in contemporary records in 1276, when exchanged the aforementioned estates in Heves County with Andrew, Bishop of Eger, implying that his father was deceased by then. Alexander belonged to the familia of the powerful Borsa clan and, in this capacity, he functioned as vice-ispán of Szabolcs County from 1308 to 1310. The younger son John was mentioned only once in 1296. Their unidentified sister married Peter Kompolti from the gens (clan) Aba. The Karászi (later Edelényi) noble family descended from Alexander. Based on sources, his offspring, with various acts of domination and losing lawsuits, squandered the wealth established by Alexander in about three generations. The family became extinct around 1350 or 1351.

== Sources ==
- Cabello, Juan (2004). "A nyírkarászi Árpád-kori vár régészeti kutatása [Archaeological Research of the Árpádian Castle in Nyírkarász]". In Neumann, Tibor (ed.). Analecta Mediaevalia II. Várak, templomok, ispotályok: tanulmányok a középkorról (in Hungarian). Argumentum Kiadó. p. 9–28. ISBN 963-446-284-7.
- Kristó, Gyula, ed. (2000). Középkori históriák oklevelekben (1002–1410) [Medieval Stories in Charters (1002–1410)] (in Hungarian). Szegedi Középkorász Műhely. ISBN 963-482-423-4.
- Markó, László (2006). A magyar állam főméltóságai Szent Istvántól napjainkig: Életrajzi Lexikon [Great Officers of State in Hungary from King Saint Stephen to Our Days: A Biographical Encyclopedia] (in Hungarian). Helikon Kiadó. ISBN 963-208-970-7.
- Sălăgean, Tudor (2016). Transylvania in the Second Half of the Thirteenth Century: The Rise of the Congregational System. East Central and Eastern Europe in the Middle Ages 450–1450. Vol. 37. Leiden and Boston: Brill. ISBN 978-90-04-24362-0.
- Zsoldos, Attila (2001). "Karászi Sándor bán és utódai (Megjegyzések a narratiok eredetéről és szerepéről) [Ban Alexander Karászi and his Descendants (Remarks on the Origin and Role of the Charters' Narrationes)]". Századok (in Hungarian). 135 (2). Magyar Történelmi Társulat: 385–407. ISSN 0039-8098.
- Zsoldos, Attila (2003). "Az özvegy és a szolgabírák [The Widow and the Noble Judges]". Századok (in Hungarian). 137 (4). Magyar Történelmi Társulat: 783–808. ISSN 0039-8098.
- Zsoldos, Attila (2007). Családi ügy: IV. Béla és István ifjabb király viszálya az 1260-as években [A family affair: The Conflict between Béla IV and Junior King Stephen in the 1260s] (in Hungarian). História, MTA Történettudományi Intézete. ISBN 978-963-9627-15-4.
- Zsoldos, Attila (2011). Magyarország világi archontológiája, 1000–1301 [Secular Archontology of Hungary, 1000–1301] (in Hungarian). História, MTA Történettudományi Intézete. ISBN 978-963-9627-38-3.

Alexander I House of Karászi Born: ? Died: 1274/76
Political offices
Preceded by Lawrence	Ban of Severin; 1268	Succeeded by Ugrin Csák
Preceded by Denis Péc	Judge royal 1272–1273	Succeeded by Ladislaus Kán
