= LEL =

Lel or LEL may refer to:

== People ==
- Lehel, also known as Lél (died 955), Magyar chieftain
- Katya Lel (born 1974), Russian pop singer
- Martin Lel (born 1978), Kenyan athlete
- Letitia Elizabeth Landon (1802–1838), English writer better known as L.E.L.

== Places ==
- Lel, Alicante, Valencian Community, Spain
- Lel, Gaynsky District, Perm Krai, Russia
- Lel (river), Perm Krai, Russia

== Religion ==
- Lel, a Polish divine twin; see Lel and Polel
- Mount Lel, abode of the deity Ēl in the Ugaritic Baal cycle

== Technology and science ==
- Lower explosive limit, in relation to flammability of gases
- lel, a ligand conformation in tris(ethylenediamine)cobalt(III) chloride and related complexes

== Transport ==
- Lake Evella Airport (IATA:LEL), Northern Territory, Australia
- Lelant railway station (National Rail code: LEL), Cornwall, UK

== Other uses ==
- League of Empire Loyalists, a British pressure group established in 1954
- Lake Erie League, an Ohio High School Athletic Association conference
- Language endangerment and loss
- LEL Arena, in Whitehaven, Cumbria, England
- Lele language (Bantu)
- London–Edinburgh–London, a randonnée bicycle event
- "Lel", a form of "lol", meaning "laughing even louder"
