= Lahitère =

- Commune
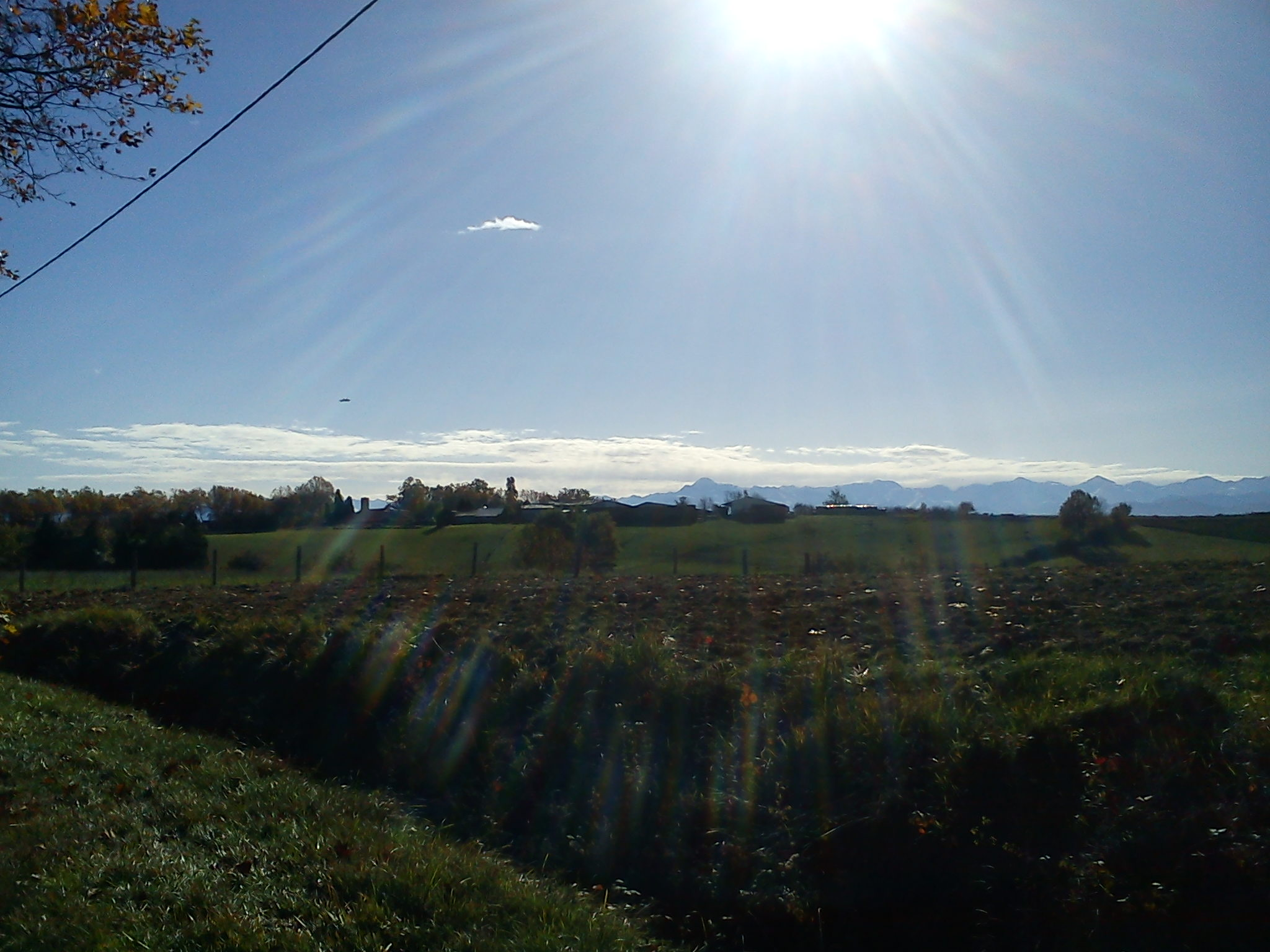
- A general view of Lahitère
- Location of Lahitère
- Location within France Location within Occitanie
- Coordinates: 43°08′24″N 1°11′35″E
- Country: France
- Region: Occitania
- Department: Haute-Garonne
- Arrondissement: Muret
- Canton: Auterive

Government
  - Mayor (2020–2026): René Audoubert
- Area^{1}: 3.9 km^{2} (1.5 sq mi)
- Elevation: 450 m (1,480 ft)
- Highest elevation: 506 m (1,660 ft)
- Lowest elevation: 340 m (1,120 ft)
- Population (2023): 52
  - Density: 13/km^{2} (35/sq mi)
- Time zone: UTC+01:00 (CET)
  - Summer (DST): UTC+02:00 (CEST)
- INSEE/Postal code: 31267 /31310
- ^{1} French Land Register data, which excludes lakes, ponds, glaciers > 1 km^{2} (0.386 sq mi or 247 acres) and river estuaries.

Lahitère (French pronunciation: [la.itɛʁ]; Occitan: La Hitèra) is a commune in the Haute-Garonne department in southwestern France.

== Geography ==
The commune is bordered by three other communes, two of them is in Haute-Garonne, and one in Ariège: Montesquieu-Volvestre to the east, Montberaud to the northwest, and finally by the department of Ariège to the southwest by the commune of Sainte-Croix-Volvestre.

== Population ==
Historical population
Year	Pop.	±% p.a.
1968	49	—
1975	46	−0.90%
1982	50	+1.20%
1990	33	−5.06%
1999	38	+1.58%
2007	51	+3.75%
2012	50	−0.40%
2017	60	+3.71%
2023	52	−2.36%
Source: INSEE

== See also ==
Communes of the Haute-Garonne department
