= Gouzens =

- Commune
- Location of Gouzens
- Location within France Location within Occitanie
- Coordinates: 43°11′13″N 1°11′20″E
- Country: France
- Region: Occitania
- Department: Haute-Garonne
- Arrondissement: Muret
- Canton: Auterive
- Intercommunality: Volvestre

Government
  - Mayor (2020–2026): Anne-Marie Naya
- Area^{1}: 5.7 km^{2} (2.2 sq mi)
- Elevation: 276 m (906 ft)
- Highest elevation: 422 m (1,385 ft)
- Lowest elevation: 260 m (850 ft)
- Population (2023): 81
  - Density: 14/km^{2} (37/sq mi)
- Time zone: UTC+01:00 (CET)
  - Summer (DST): UTC+02:00 (CEST)
- INSEE/Postal code: 31226 /31310
- ^{1} French Land Register data, which excludes lakes, ponds, glaciers > 1 km^{2} (0.386 sq mi or 247 acres) and river estuaries.

Gouzens is a commune in the Haute-Garonne department in southwestern France.

== Geography ==
The commune is bordered by two other communes: Montesquieu-Volvestre to the east and finally by Montberaud to the west.

== Population ==
Historical population
Year	Pop.	±% p.a.
1968	72	—
1975	49	−5.35%
1982	52	+0.85%
1990	61	+2.02%
1999	61	+0.00%
2007	96	+5.83%
2012	88	−1.73%
2017	81	−1.64%
2023	81	+0.00%
Source: INSEE

== See also ==
- Communes of the Haute-Garonne department
