= Labruyère-Dorsa =

- Commune
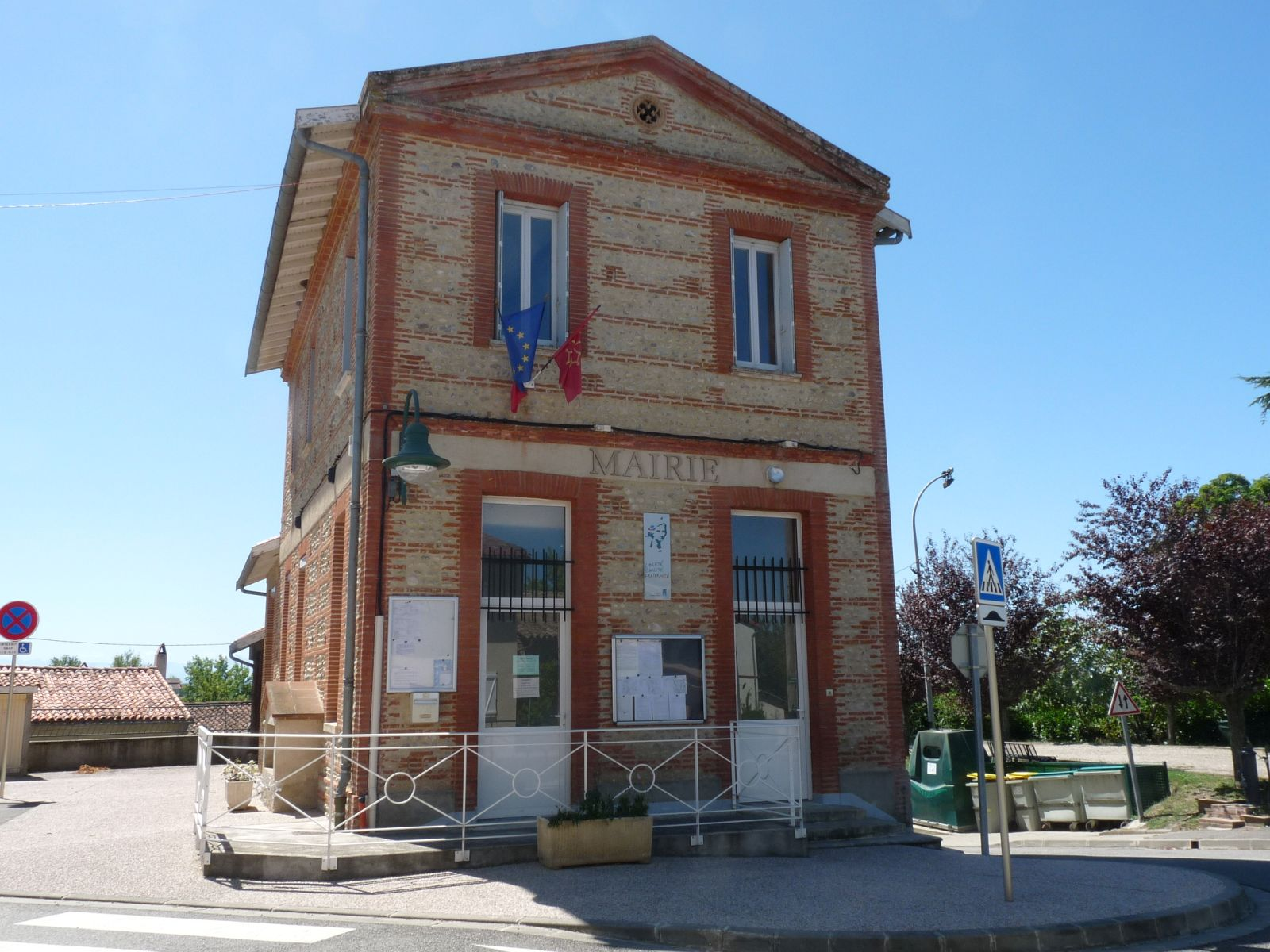
- The town hall in Labruyère-Dorsa
- Location of Labruyère-Dorsa
- Location within France Location within Occitanie
- Coordinates: 43°24′29″N 1°28′14″E
- Country: France
- Region: Occitania
- Department: Haute-Garonne
- Arrondissement: Muret
- Canton: Auterive

Government
  - Mayor (2020–2026): Julien Godefroy
- Area^{1}: 2.19 km^{2} (0.85 sq mi)
- Elevation: 240 m (790 ft)
- Highest elevation: 252 m (827 ft)
- Lowest elevation: 184 m (604 ft)
- Population (2023): 317
  - Density: 145/km^{2} (375/sq mi)
- Time zone: UTC+01:00 (CET)
  - Summer (DST): UTC+02:00 (CEST)
- INSEE/Postal code: 31256 /31190
- ^{1} French Land Register data, which excludes lakes, ponds, glaciers > 1 km^{2} (0.386 sq mi or 247 acres) and river estuaries.

Labruyère-Dorsa (French pronunciation: [labʁɥijɛʁ dɔʁsa]; Occitan: La Bruguièra Dorçan) is a small rural village and commune in Haute-Garonne, a department in southwestern France.

== Geography ==
The commune is bordered by four other communes: Issus to the northeast, Auragne to the east, Auterive to the south, and finally by Grépiac to the west.

== Population ==
Historical population
Year	Pop.	±% p.a.
1968	59	—
1975	59	+0.00%
1982	55	−1.00%
1990	88	+6.05%
1999	143	+5.54%
2007	226	+5.89%
2012	259	+2.76%
2017	284	+1.86%
2023	317	+1.85%
Source: INSEE

== See also ==
Communes of the Haute-Garonne department
