= Morom =

Morom may be,

- Morom language
- Morom commune, Cambodia
