= Berat (disambiguation) =

Berat is a city in south Albania.

Berat may also refer to:

- Berat County, an administrative county surrounding Berat
- Berat District, a former administrative district surrounding Berat
- Berat, Queensland, a locality in Australia
- Bérat, a commune in Haute-Garonne, France

== See also ==
- Beratlı
