= Eley (name) =

Eeley is a surname and a given name. People with this name are generally found on the outskirts of the Cotswolds.

== Surname ==
- Ayinde Eley (born 1998), American football player
- Brian Eley (1946–2022), British chessplayer
- Bridget Cracroft-Eley (1933–2008), British secretary and farmer and Lord Lieutenant of Lincolnshire
- Bryan Eley (born 1939), British racewalker
- Bud Eley (born 1975), American basketball player
- Clifton Eley (born 1961), American football player
- Dan Eley (1914–2015), British chemist and academic
- Donald Hill-Eley (born 1969), American football coach and former player
- Sir Frederick Eley, 1st Baronet (1866–1951), English banker
- Frederick Eley (architect) (1884–1979), American architect
- Geoff Eley (born 1949), British-born historian of Germany
- Geoffrey Eley (1904–1990), British banker
- Gladys Pearl Baker Mortensen Eley (1902–1984), mother of American actress Marilyn Monroe
- Helen Eley, American actress and singer
- Jim Eley (1932–2014), Australian rules football player
- Jon Eley (born 1984), British speed skater
- Maxwell Eley (1902–1983), British rower
- Monroe Eley, American football player
- Robin Eley (born 1978), Australian painter
- Stanley Eley (1904–1990), British Anglican bishop
- Thalia C. Eley, British academic and psychologist
- William Eley, British football player

== Given name ==
- Eley Williams, British writer

== See also ==
- Eley (disambiguation)
