= Ili =

Ili, ILI, Illi may refer to:

== Abbreviations ==
- Indian Law Institute
- Influenza-like illness
- Intelligent Land Investments
- Intensive lifestyle intervention, a type of lifestyle medicine
- International Law Institute, a non-profit organization which teaches and publishes in the field of international development in the United States
- International Legion of Intelligence, the former name of Intertel, a high-IQ society
- Intuitive Logical Introvert, a personality type in socionics
- Iran Language Institute, a state-owned, non-profit organization for developing foreign language learning in Iran
- Irish Life International, part of Irish Life and Permanent

== People ==
- Ili (singer) (born 1998), or Emily Middlemas, Scottish singer-songwriter
- Ili (actress) (born 1993), Taiwanese actress

== Placenames ==
- Ili (river), in China and Kazakhstan
- Ili Kazakh Autonomous Prefecture, in Xinjiang, China
- Yining City, seat of Ili Kazakh Autonomous Prefecture
- Ili, a name sometimes used in the past for the main city of the Ili region: first Huiyuan, later Suiding

== Other ==
- Ili Turki language (ISO 639-3 ili), a Turkic language of China

== See also ==
- Ili Rebellion, a Soviet-backed revolt against the Kuomintang government of the Republic of China in 1944
- Ba Ili, a sub-prefecture of Chari-Baguirmi, Chad
- Illi (disambiguation)
- Eli (disambiguation)
- Ely (disambiguation)
- Eley (disambiguation)
- Yili (disambiguation) (the Pinyin spelling for the word that's transcribed as "Ili" in Wade–Giles)
- Illy (disambiguation)
