= Murum =

Murum may refer to:

- Murum Dam, on the Murum River, Sarawak, Malaysia
- Murum (state constituency), represented in the Sarawak State Legislative Assembly
- Murum, Osmanabad, Maharashtra, India
- Murum Village, Baramati, Pune, Maharashtra, India
