= Eley =

Eley can mean:

- Eley (name), list of people with the name Eley
- Eley Industrial Estate, in Edmonton, London
- Eley Kishimoto, British fashion and design company
- Eley Limited (formerly Eley Brothers), ammunition manufacturer in Sutton Coldfield, England
- Eley Peak, small rock peak in the Ellsworth Mountains in Antarctica
- Eley, Şereflikoçhisar, village in Ankara, Turkey

== See also ==
- Ely (disambiguation)
- Ili (disambiguation)
