= Ada, Oregon =

Unincorporated community in the state of Oregon, United States

- Unincorporated community
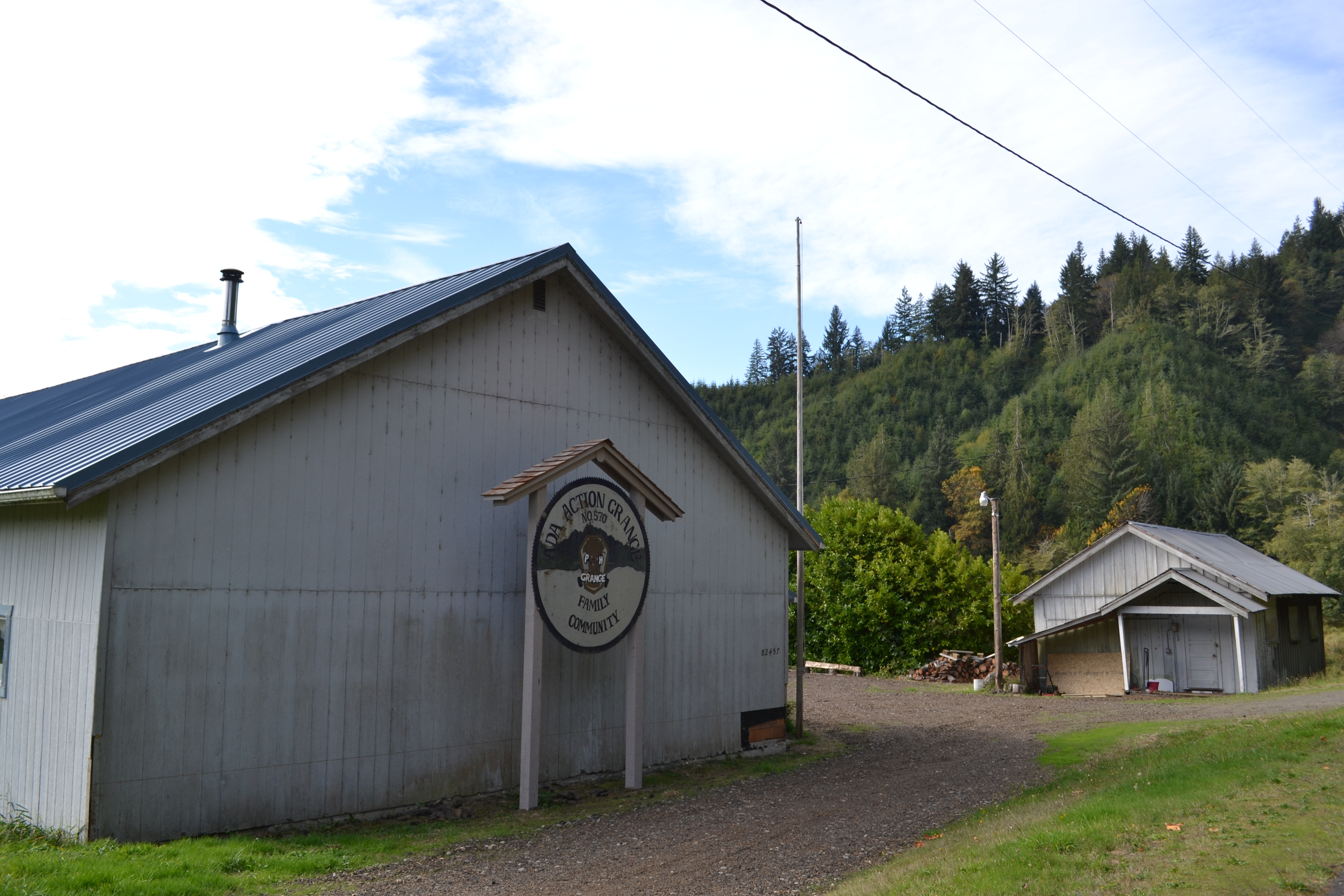

- Location within Oregon Location within the United States
- Coordinates: 43°52′29″N 124°02′42″W
- Country: United States
- State: Oregon
- County: Douglas
- Elevation: 39 ft (12 m)
- Time zone: UTC-8 (Pacific (PST))
  - Summer (DST): UTC-7 (PDT)
- ZIP code: 97493
- GNIS feature ID: 1137009

Ada is an unincorporated community in Lane County, Oregon, United States, at the intersection of Fiddle Creek, Canary, and Ada Roads, about 10 miles Southeast of the junction of Canary Road with Oregon Highway 101. Nearby Siltcoos Lake is the location of the Ada Park and fishing resort.

The community was named for Miss Ada Wilkes (later Ada Cleveland), daughter of Benjamin and Jaretta Wilkes, longtime residents of the area. The community is not only one of Oregon's rare place names attributed to a first name, but is also an even rarer Oregon palindromic place name. Also noteworthy is the fact that when founded in 1892, Ada was located in Douglas County and later entered Lane County only after a 1903 boundary change. The Ada Resort on Siltcoos Lake and nearby Ada Park also are in Douglas County.

Ada is a station on the Coos Bay Rail Line, formerly the Coos Bay Branch of the Southern Pacific Railroad.
