= Palaminy =

- Commune
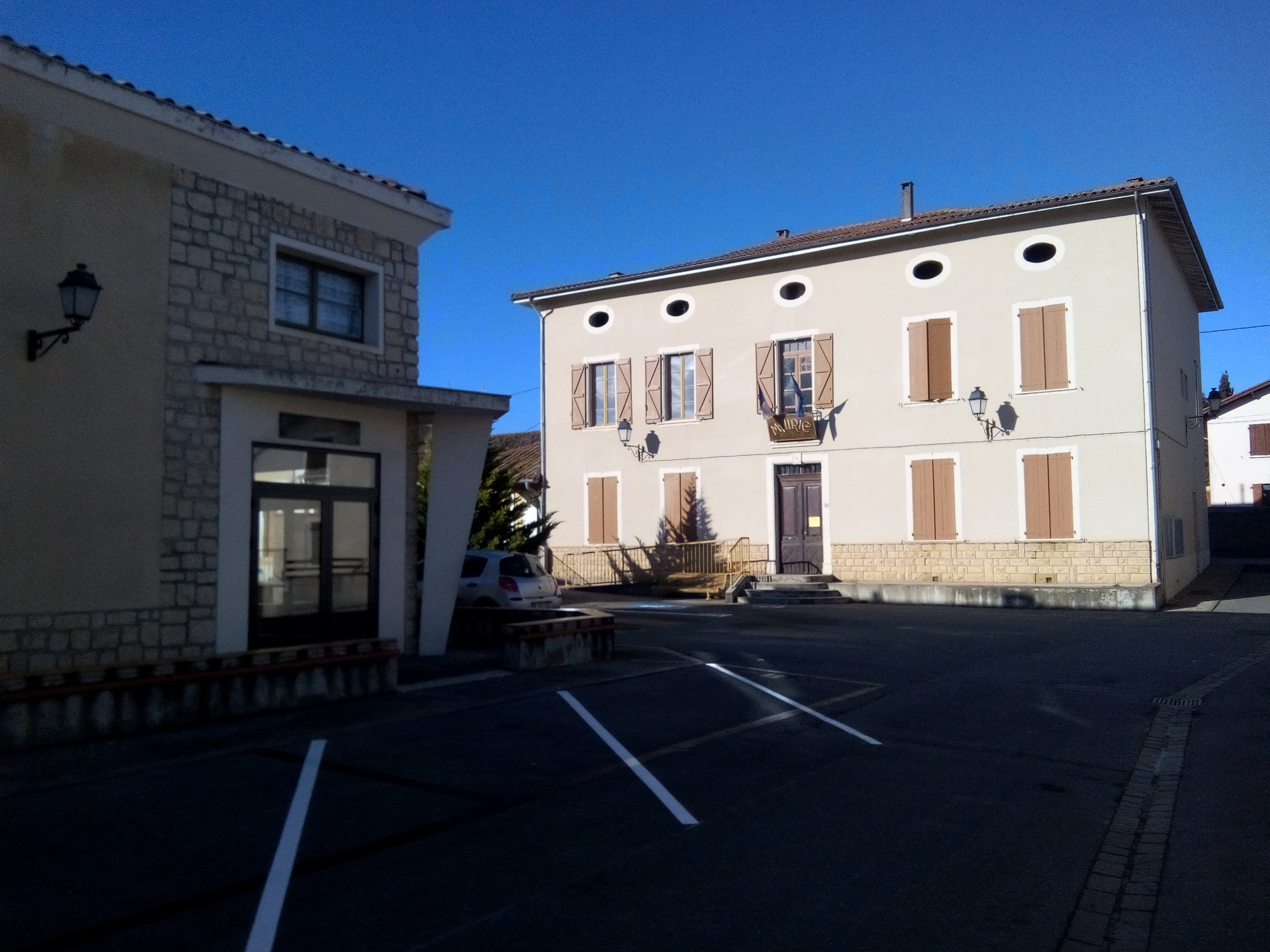
- The town hall in Palaminy

- Coat of arms
- Location of Palaminy
- Location within France Location within Occitanie
- Coordinates: 43°12′13″N 1°04′12″E
- Country: France
- Region: Occitania
- Department: Haute-Garonne
- Arrondissement: Muret
- Canton: Cazères
- Intercommunality: Cœur de Garonne

Government
  - Mayor (2020–2026): Christian Sensebe
- Area^{1}: 11.13 km^{2} (4.30 sq mi)
- Elevation: 249 m (817 ft)
- Highest elevation: 460 m (1,510 ft)
- Lowest elevation: 235 m (771 ft)
- Population (2023): 751
  - Density: 67.5/km^{2} (175/sq mi)
- Time zone: UTC+01:00 (CET)
  - Summer (DST): UTC+02:00 (CEST)
- INSEE/Postal code: 31406 /31220
- ^{1} French Land Register data, which excludes lakes, ponds, glaciers > 1 km^{2} (0.386 sq mi or 247 acres) and river estuaries.

Palaminy (French pronunciation: [palamini]; Occitan: Palamenic) is a commune in the Haute-Garonne department in southwestern France.

== Geography ==
=== Climate ===
Palaminy has an oceanic climate (Köppen climate classification Cfb). The average annual temperature in Palaminy is 13.2 °C (55.8 °F). The average annual rainfall is 715.2 mm (28.16 in) with May as the wettest month. The temperatures are highest on average in July, at around 21.6 °C (70.9 °F), and lowest in January, at around 5.5 °C (41.9 °F). The highest temperature ever recorded in Palaminy was 40.4 °C (104.7 °F) on 13 August 2003; the coldest temperature ever recorded was −13.1 °C (8.4 °F) on 9 February 2012.

Climate data for Palaminy (1991−2020 normals, extremes 2002−present)
Month	Jan	Feb	Mar	Apr	May	Jun	Jul	Aug	Sep	Oct	Nov	Dec	Year
Record high °C (°F)	21.8 (71.2)	25.2 (77.4)	25.7 (78.3)	29.1 (84.4)	33.0 (91.4)	39.6 (103.3)	39.3 (102.7)	40.4 (104.7)	35.7 (96.3)	30.4 (86.7)	25.1 (77.2)	22.3 (72.1)	40.4 (104.7)
Mean daily maximum °C (°F)	10.2 (50.4)	11.3 (52.3)	14.9 (58.8)	18.0 (64.4)	20.9 (69.6)	25.7 (78.3)	27.8 (82.0)	27.9 (82.2)	25.1 (77.2)	20.6 (69.1)	14.4 (57.9)	11.1 (52.0)	19.0 (66.2)
Daily mean °C (°F)	5.5 (41.9)	6.0 (42.8)	9.1 (48.4)	12.1 (53.8)	15.2 (59.4)	19.6 (67.3)	21.6 (70.9)	21.4 (70.5)	18.4 (65.1)	14.4 (57.9)	9.1 (48.4)	6.0 (42.8)	13.2 (55.8)
Mean daily minimum °C (°F)	0.9 (33.6)	0.7 (33.3)	3.3 (37.9)	6.3 (43.3)	9.4 (48.9)	13.4 (56.1)	15.3 (59.5)	15.0 (59.0)	11.8 (53.2)	8.2 (46.8)	3.7 (38.7)	1.0 (33.8)	7.4 (45.3)
Record low °C (°F)	−10.1 (13.8)	−13.1 (8.4)	−10.6 (12.9)	−3.8 (25.2)	−0.5 (31.1)	2.9 (37.2)	7.5 (45.5)	5.1 (41.2)	2.0 (35.6)	−4.5 (23.9)	−8.8 (16.2)	−9.9 (14.2)	−13.1 (8.4)
Average precipitation mm (inches)	64.2 (2.53)	50.9 (2.00)	56.5 (2.22)	74.8 (2.94)	82.5 (3.25)	63.5 (2.50)	52.4 (2.06)	53.3 (2.10)	41.2 (1.62)	49.6 (1.95)	69.4 (2.73)	56.9 (2.24)	715.2 (28.16)
Average precipitation days (≥ 1.0 mm)	10.4	8.5	9.3	9.9	10.3	8.4	6.7	6.7	6.3	7.3	10.4	9.3	103.5
Source: Météo-France

== Heraldry ==
Coat of arms of Palaminy	Divided per pale, 1) argent, a castle of the place sable moving from the line of partition, 2) or, three ears of wheat vert joined in base; a bend azure overall charged with a lightning bolt or. Adopted around 1994.

== Population ==
Historical population
Year	Pop.	±% p.a.
1968	534	—
1975	533	−0.03%
1982	585	+1.34%
1990	632	+0.97%
1999	629	−0.05%
2007	782	+2.76%
2012	808	+0.66%
2017	808	+0.00%
2023	751	−1.21%
Source: INSEE

The inhabitants of the commune are called Palaminyciens in French.

== See also ==
- Communes of the Haute-Garonne department
