= Savères =

- Commune
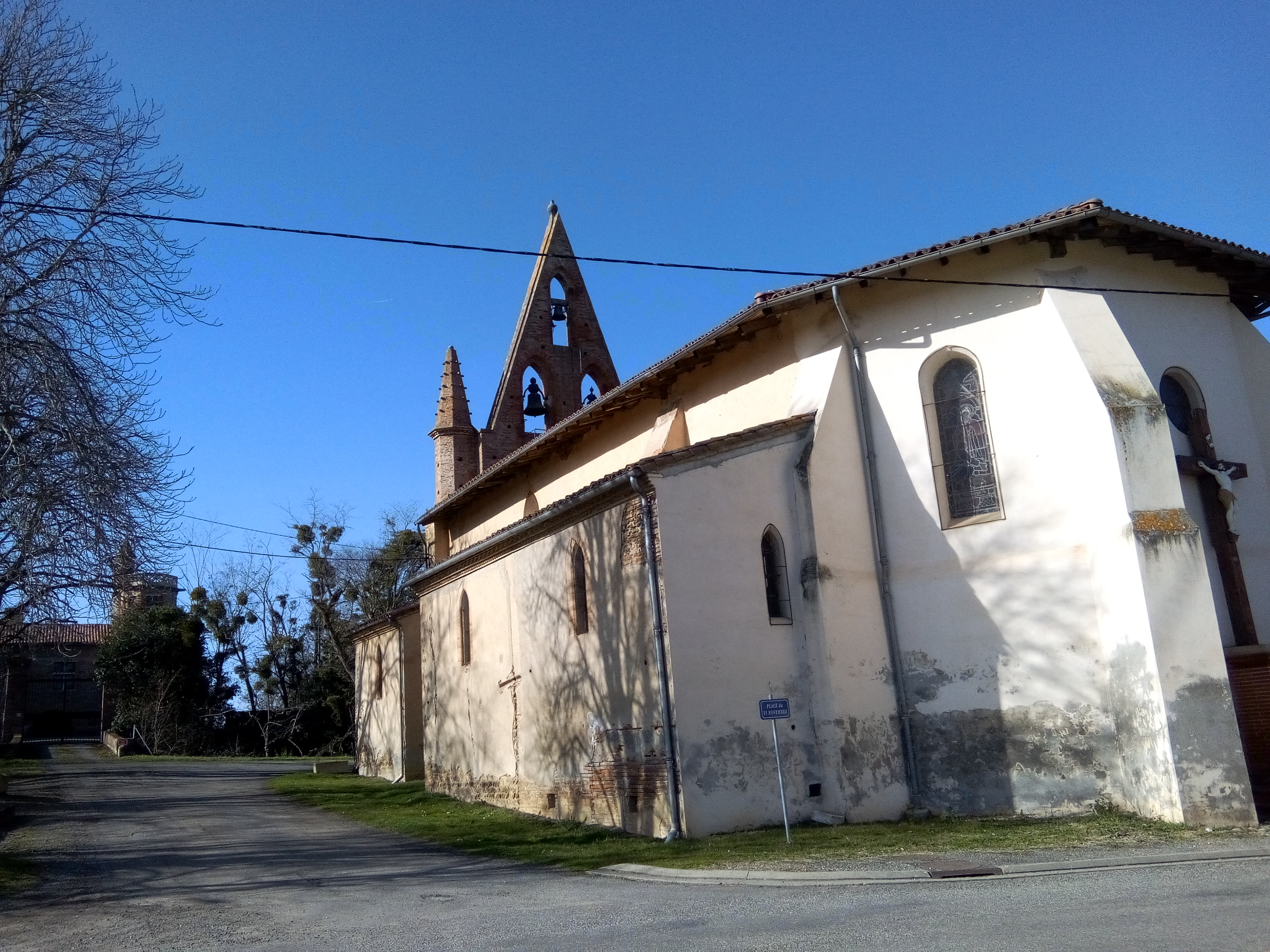
- The church in Savères
- Location of Savères
- Location within France Location within Occitanie
- Coordinates: 43°22′18″N 1°06′17″E
- Country: France
- Region: Occitania
- Department: Haute-Garonne
- Arrondissement: Muret
- Canton: Cazères

Government
  - Mayor (2024–2026): Amandine Rouquette
- Area^{1}: 10.71 km^{2} (4.14 sq mi)
- Elevation: 220 m (720 ft)
- Highest elevation: 337 m (1,106 ft)
- Lowest elevation: 220 m (720 ft)
- Population (2023): 209
  - Density: 19.5/km^{2} (50.5/sq mi)
- Time zone: UTC+01:00 (CET)
  - Summer (DST): UTC+02:00 (CEST)
- INSEE/Postal code: 31538 /31370
- ^{1} French Land Register data, which excludes lakes, ponds, glaciers > 1 km^{2} (0.386 sq mi or 247 acres) and river estuaries.

Savères (French pronunciation: [savɛʁ]; Occitan: Savèra) is a commune in the Haute-Garonne department in southwestern France.

== Population ==
Historical population
Year	Pop.	±% p.a.
1968	152	—
1975	154	+0.19%
1982	131	−2.28%
1990	155	+2.13%
1999	156	+0.07%
2007	203	+3.35%
2012	199	−0.40%
2017	218	+1.84%
2023	209	−0.70%
Source: INSEE

== See also ==
- Communes of the Haute-Garonne department
