= Stella Blandy =

French writer (1836–1925)

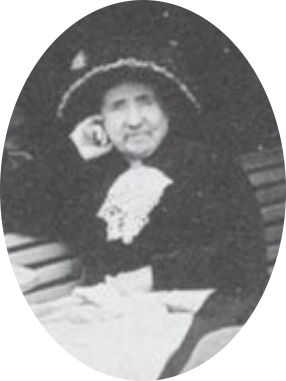
- Stella Blandy portrait.png
- Born: Françoise-Stella Boué; 24 December 1836; Montesquieu-Volvestre, France
- Died: 18 April 1925 (aged 88); Montesquieu-Volvestre, France
- Occupations: writer; feminist
- Spouse: Francis Blandy (d. 1878)
- Children: 4
- Writing career
- Language: French
- Genres: novels; juvenile literature; translation; feminist non-fiction

Stella Blandy (née Boué; 24 December 1836 - 18 April 1925) was a French writer and a committed feminist. A contributor to the literary journals Revue contemporaine and Revue des deux mondes, she wrote novels and essays, and also translated English and Italian works into French. Blandy died in 1925.

== Biography ==
Françoise-Stella Boué was born 24 December 1836, in the small town of Montesquieu-Volvestre. The family was wealthy and at the time ran the town hall. She was attracted to writing early on in life. Following an excellent education, she immediately continued her studies abroad in England. While there, she married Francis Blandy with whom she had four children; two, Frank and Jeanne, survived early childhood. Her husband died in 1878.

On her return to France, she began publishing her works, enjoying some success. Her novels, with strong regional appeal, were written principally for younger readers. While in Paris, she developed her feminist writing as she established friendships with George Sand and André Léo. In the late 1860s, she became active in the growing feminist movement, contributing to the journal Le Droit des femmes alongside Léon Richer, Maria Deraismes and Hubertine Auclert.

Her publishers included Hetzel, Firmin Didot, Delagrave, Hachette and Armand Colin. Around March 1875, together with Henriette Caroste, Anna Houry, Auclert, Deraismes, and her sister Anna Féresse-Deraismes, Blandy co-signed a letter asking Victor Hugo to support their feminist views.

Blandy collaborated with Revue contemporaine and Revue des deux mondes. She also translated English and Italian works. Among others, Blandy is remembered for her adaptation of Mayne Reid's novel, L’Habitation au désert, under the title Les Robinsons de terre ferme. Her novel La Teppe aux merles, published in 1890, is reminiscent of Alain-Fournier's hero, Le Grand Meaulnes. Stella Blandy died at the age of 88 in the town where she was born.

== Complete works ==
- 1864, Une Noce dans un Village Mâconnais
- 1867, La Dernière Chanson, Scène du Mâconnais
- 1869, Revanche de femme
- 1869, L'Oncle Philibert
- 1873, Les Indiscrétions du Princes Svanine. Un Musulman, s'il vous plaît. Le Bruderschaft. Sept pour un. L’Émeraude, 1873
- 1875, Bénédicte
- 1877, Le Petit Roi
- 1878, Les Robinsons de Terre Ferme (adaptation of L'Habitation au désert by Mayne Reid)
- 1880, Le Procès de l'absent
- 1881, La Dette de Zeéna,
- 1881, Six pence, conte de Noël
- 1881, Sous le Guy (novel)
- 1882, La Benjamine
- 1882, La Fille de Hakim
- 1883, Les Épreuves de Norbert
- 1883, Un oncle à héritage
- 1884, Trois sous neufs (novel)
- 1885, Mont Salvage
- 1885, Mon ami et moi
- 1885, Tante Marise
- 1886, Trois contes de Noël
- 1887, Rouzétou
- 1888, Fils de veuve
- 1888, La Pie au nid
- 1888, La Pierre de touche
- 1890, La Teppe aux merles
- 1890, La Part du cadet
- 1890, Le Bouquet d'algues
- 1891, La Pièce de douze sous
- 1892, Castelvert
- 1893, Berthe la Frisonne. À l'aveuglette. Bec-d'Acier
- 1893, Le Protégé d'Alice
- 1894, Le Droit Chemin. Par la Traverse. La Veste du Colporteur
- 1895, Au tournant du Chemin
- 1897, Le Capitaine aux pieds nus
- 1902, La Dame noire. Une Trouvaille. Sur la Pierre du souvenir
- 1903, Le Siège de Calais
- 1904, D'une rive à l'autre

== External link ==
- Works by or about Stella Blandy at the Internet Archive
- Works by Stella Blandy at Gallica
