= Saint-Araille =

- Commune
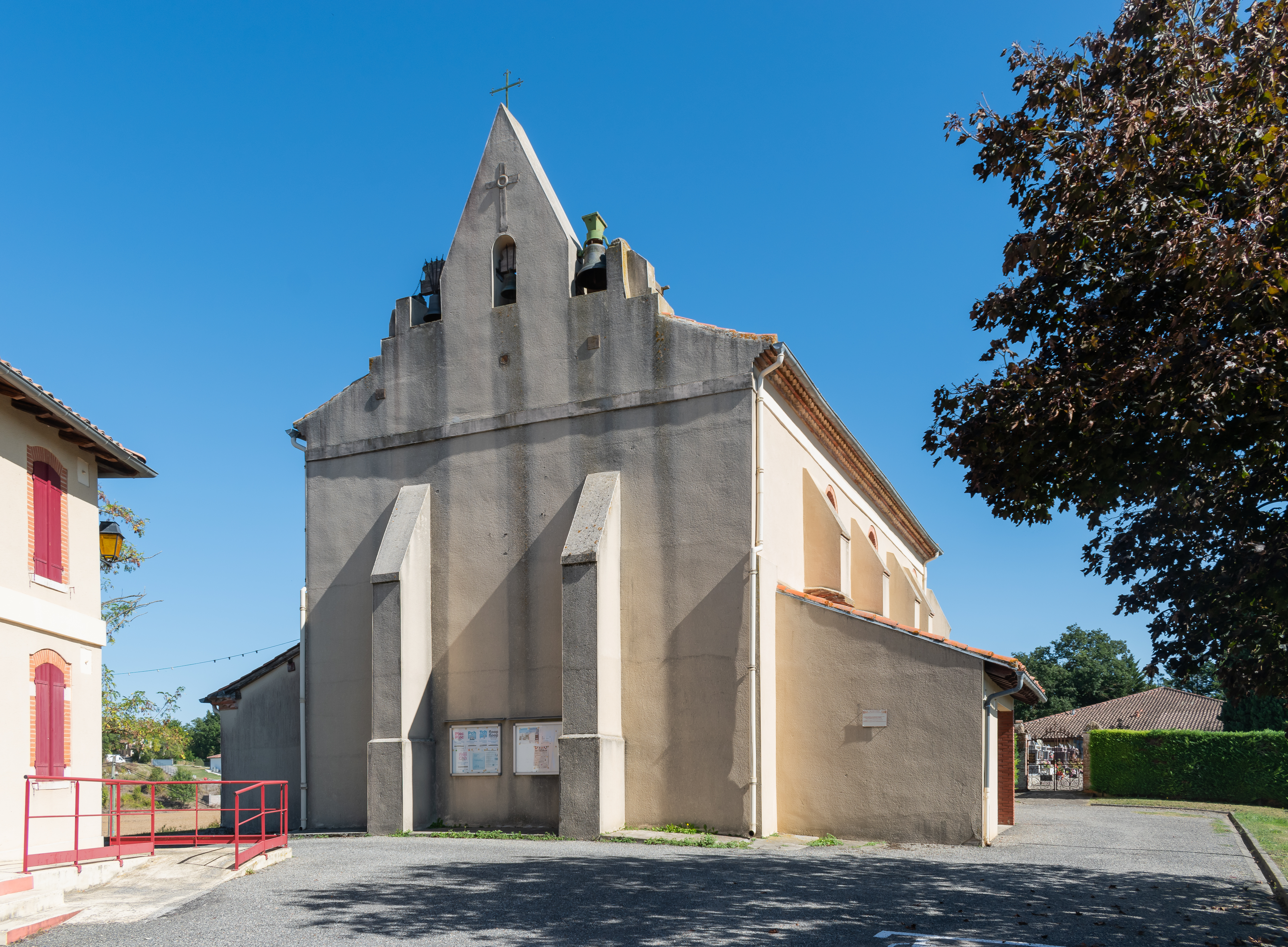
- St Germerius church in St-Araille
- Location of Saint-Araille
- Location within France Location within Occitanie
- Coordinates: 43°21′34″N 0°59′28″E
- Country: France
- Region: Occitania
- Department: Haute-Garonne
- Arrondissement: Muret
- Canton: Cazères

Government
  - Mayor (2020–2026): Nicole Breque
- Area^{1}: 6.54 km^{2} (2.53 sq mi)
- Elevation: 330 m (1,080 ft)
- Highest elevation: 340 m (1,120 ft)
- Lowest elevation: 238 m (781 ft)
- Population (2023): 123
  - Density: 18.8/km^{2} (48.7/sq mi)
- Time zone: UTC+01:00 (CET)
  - Summer (DST): UTC+02:00 (CEST)
- INSEE/Postal code: 31469 /31430
- ^{1} French Land Register data, which excludes lakes, ponds, glaciers > 1 km^{2} (0.386 sq mi or 247 acres) and river estuaries.

Saint-Araille (French pronunciation: [sɛ̃.t‿aʁaj]; Occitan: Senta Aralha) is a commune in the Haute-Garonne department in southwestern France.

== Population ==
Historical population
Year	Pop.	±% p.a.
1968	123	—
1975	128	+0.57%
1982	141	+1.39%
1990	128	−1.20%
1999	125	−0.26%
2007	150	+2.31%
2012	137	−1.80%
2017	152	+2.10%
2023	123	−3.47%
Source: INSEE

== See also ==
- Communes of the Haute-Garonne department
