= Sainte-Foy-de-Peyrolières =

- Commune
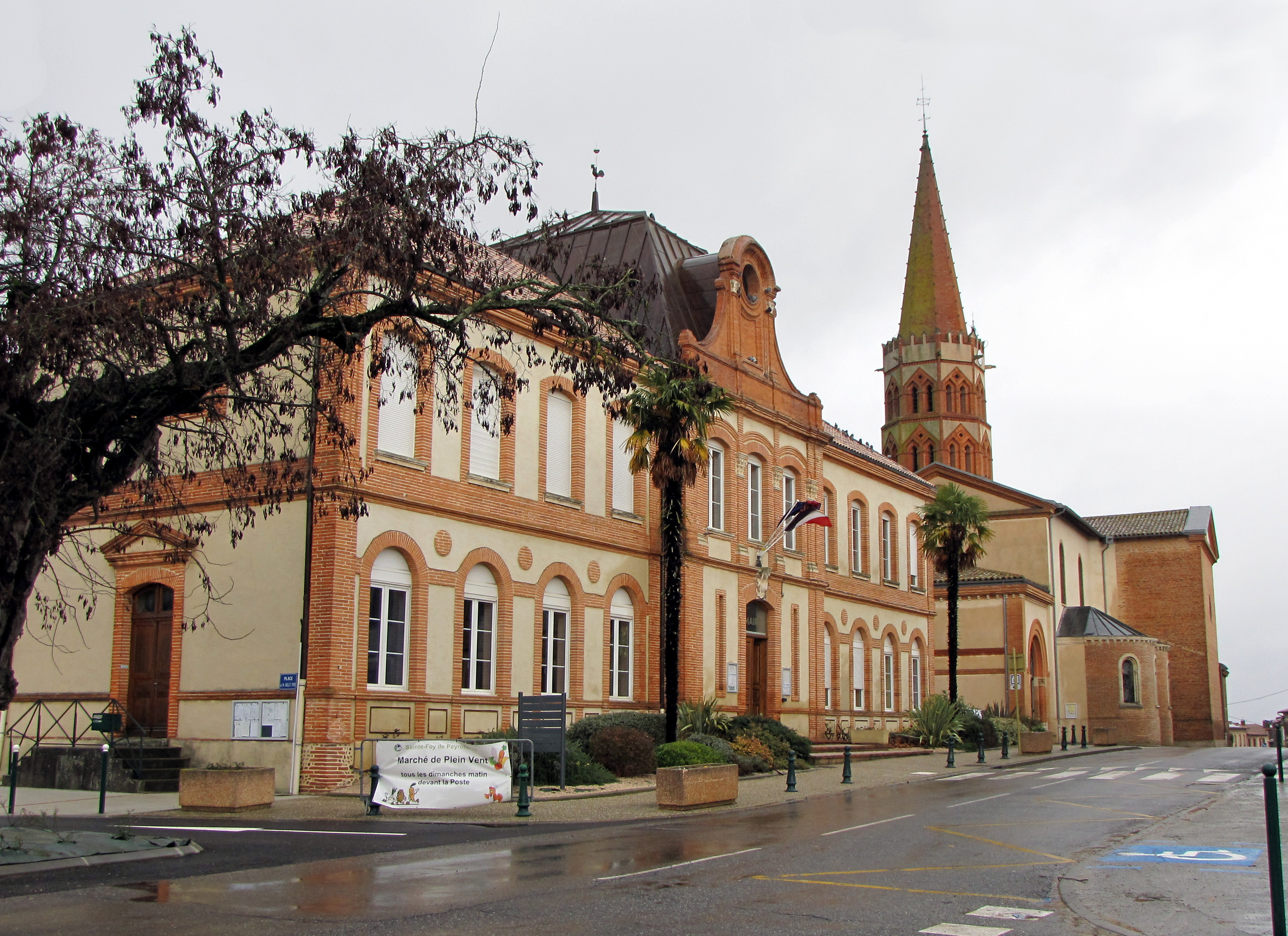
- The town hall and church in Sainte-Foy-de-Peyrolières

- Coat of arms
- Location of Sainte-Foy-de-Peyrolières
- Location within France Location within Occitanie
- Coordinates: 43°29′38″N 1°08′45″E
- Country: France
- Region: Occitania
- Department: Haute-Garonne
- Arrondissement: Muret
- Canton: Cazères

Government
  - Mayor (2020–2026): François Vives
- Area^{1}: 38.02 km^{2} (14.68 sq mi)
- Highest elevation: 319 m (1,047 ft)
- Lowest elevation: 188 m (617 ft)
- Population (2023): 2,088
  - Density: 54.92/km^{2} (142.2/sq mi)
- Time zone: UTC+01:00 (CET)
  - Summer (DST): UTC+02:00 (CEST)
- INSEE/Postal code: 31481 /31470
- ^{1} French Land Register data, which excludes lakes, ponds, glaciers > 1 km^{2} (0.386 sq mi or 247 acres) and river estuaries.

Sainte-Foy-de-Peyrolières (French pronunciation: [sɛ̃t fwa də peʁɔljɛʁ]; Occitan: Senta Fe de Peirolièras) is a commune in the Haute-Garonne department in southwestern France.

== Population ==
Historical population
Year	Pop.	±% p.a.
1968	881	—
1975	832	−0.81%
1982	1,074	+3.71%
1990	1,221	+1.62%
1999	1,436	+1.82%
2007	1,909	+3.62%
2012	2,035	+1.29%
2017	2,074	+0.38%
2023	2,088	+0.11%
Source: INSEE

== See also ==
- Communes of the Haute-Garonne department
