= Majam =

Coordinates: 24°42′N 73°33′E

- Village
- Location in Rajasthan, India Majam (India)
- Country: India
- State: Rajasthan
- District: Udaipur

Population (2011)
  - Total: 1,239

Languages
  - Official: Hindi, Mewari
- Time zone: UTC+5:30 (IST)
- PIN: 313011
- Vehicle registration: RJ-
- Nearest city: Udaipur
- Lok Sabha constituency: Udaipur

Majam is a village in Gogunda Tehsil in Udaipur district in the Indian state of Rajasthan. The District headquarter of the village is Udaipur.

The postal head office of Majam is Badgaon.

== Geography ==
It is 35 kilometers away from the Udaipur district headquarters.

== Demographics ==
As per Population Census 2011, the total population of Majam is 1239. Males constitute 52% of the population and females 48%.

== Literacy ==
The literacy rate of Majam village is 44.37% as per 2011 census which is very low compared to 66.11% of Rajasthan.
