= Ono, Kentucky =

Unincorporated community in Kentucky, United States

Ono
- Unincorporated community
- Location within the state of Kentucky Ono (the United States)
- Coordinates: 36°59′19″N 84°58′00″W
- Country: United States
- State: Kentucky
- County: Russell
- Elevation: 981 ft (299 m)
- Time zone: UTC-6 (Central (CST))
  - Summer (DST): UTC-5 (EDT)
- GNIS feature ID: 508752

Ono is an unincorporated community located in Russell County, Kentucky, United States.

The community may be named after the biblical place of Ono, according to local history.
