= Tut, Lorestan =

Tut توت
- Village
- Location within Iran
- Coordinates: 33°24′07″N 48°54′53″E
- Country: Iran
- Province: Lorestan
- County: Dorud
- Bakhsh: Central
- Rural District: Dorud

Population (2006)
  - Total: 288
- Time zone: UTC+3:30 (IRST)
  - Summer (DST): UTC+4:30 (IRDT)

Tut (Persian: توت, also Romanized as Tūt; also known as Tūt-e Gūrkash) is a village in Dorud Rural District, in the Central District of Dorud County, Lorestan Province, Iran. At the 2006 census, its population was 288, in 59 families.
