= Auragne =

- Commune
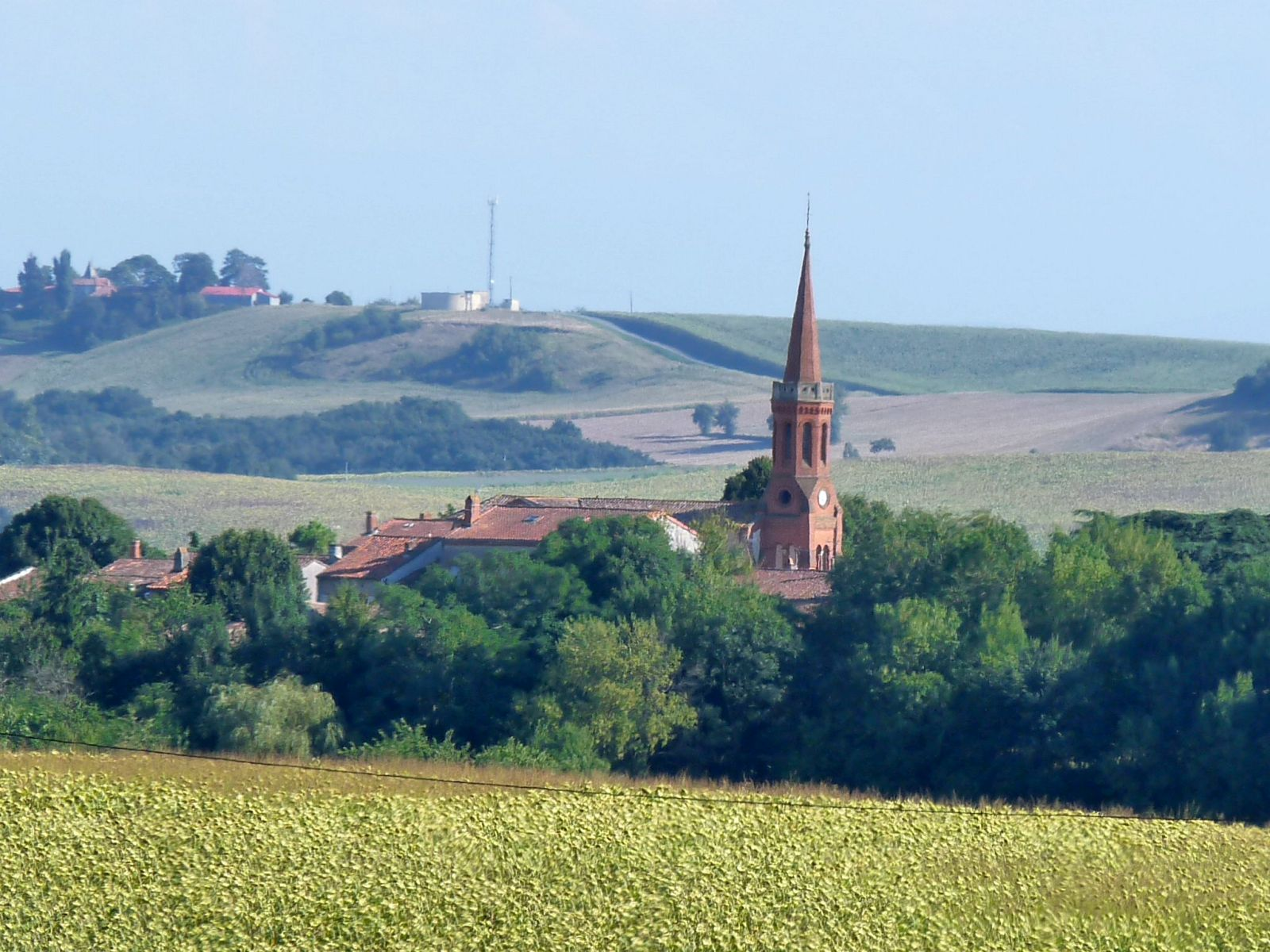
- A general view of Auragne

- Coat of arms
- Location of Auragne
- Location within France Location within Occitanie
- Coordinates: 43°23′26″N 1°30′33″E
- Country: France
- Region: Occitania
- Department: Haute-Garonne
- Arrondissement: Muret
- Canton: Escalquens
- Intercommunality: Bassin Auterivain Haut-Garonnais

Government
  - Mayor (2020–2026): René Pacher
- Area^{1}: 13.63 km^{2} (5.26 sq mi)
- Elevation: 265 m (869 ft)
- Highest elevation: 292 m (958 ft)
- Lowest elevation: 183 m (600 ft)
- Population (2023): 480
  - Density: 35/km^{2} (91/sq mi)
- Time zone: UTC+01:00 (CET)
  - Summer (DST): UTC+02:00 (CEST)
- INSEE/Postal code: 31024 /31190
- ^{1} French Land Register data, which excludes lakes, ponds, glaciers > 1 km^{2} (0.386 sq mi or 247 acres) and river estuaries.

Auragne (French pronunciation: [oʁaɲ]; Occitan: Auranha) is a commune in the Haute-Garonne department in southwestern France.

== Population ==
Historical population
Year	Pop.	±% p.a.
1968	305	—
1975	213	−5.00%
1982	270	+3.45%
1990	299	+1.28%
1999	310	+0.40%
2007	392	+2.98%
2012	414	+1.10%
2017	427	+0.62%
2023	480	+1.97%
Source: INSEE

The inhabitants are known as Auragnais in French.

== See also ==
- Communes of the Haute-Garonne department
