= Uku, Nepal =

Uku उकु
- Village development committee
- Location in Nepal
- Coordinates: 29.73°N 80.39°E
- Country: Nepal
- Zone: Mahakali Zone
- District: Darchula District

Population (1991)
  - Total: 3,931
- Time zone: UTC+5:45 (Nepal Time)

Uku is a village development committee in Darchula District in the Mahakali Zone of western Nepal right bank of Kali river. At the time of the 1991 Nepal census, the population was 3931. It is a Historical place being an ancient kingdom of kings of the Pal dynasty.
