= Naran, Hormozgan =

Naran نران
- Village
- Location within Iran
- Coordinates: 27°38′19″N 56°46′00″E
- Country: Iran
- Province: Hormozgan
- County: Bandar Abbas
- Bakhsh: Takht
- Rural District: Shamil

Population (2006)
  - Total: 137
- Time zone: UTC+3:30 (IRST)
  - Summer (DST): UTC+4:30 (IRDT)

Naran (Persian: نران, also Romanized as Narān; also known as Narān Ḩasan Langī) is a village in Shamil Rural District, Takht District, Bandar Abbas County, Hormozgan Province, Iran. At the 2006 census, its population was 137, in 30 families.
