= William Eley (footballer) =

English footballer

Personal information
- Position: Outside right

Senior career*
Years	Team	Apps	(Gls)
- Matlock Town
1907	Bradford City	1	(0)
- * Club domestic league appearances and goals

William Eley was an English professional footballer who played as an outside right.

== Career ==
Eley played for Matlock Town and Bradford City.

For Bradford City he made 1 appearance in the Football League.

== Sources ==
- Frost, Terry (1988). Bradford City A Complete Record 1903-1988. Breedon Books Sport. ISBN 0-907969-38-0.
