= Qoroq, Yazd =

Qoroq قرق
- Village
- Location within Iran
- Coordinates: 31°36′27″N 54°07′23″E
- Country: Iran
- Province: Yazd
- County: Taft
- Bakhsh: Central
- Rural District: Shirkuh

Population (2006)
  - Total: 79
- Time zone: UTC+3:30 (IRST)
  - Summer (DST): UTC+4:30 (IRDT)

Qoroq (Persian: قرق) is a village in Shirkuh Rural District, in the Central District of Taft County, Yazd Province, Iran. At the 2006 census, its population was 79, in 35 families.
