= Abplanalp =

Coordinates: 46.772°N 8.021°E

Abplanalp is a Swiss surname. Originally a locational surname, it is derived from Planalp, the name of an alpine pasture (alp) and dispersed settlement above Brienz, Bernese Oberland, on the southern flank of Brienzer Rothorn, at an altitude between about 1300 and 1900 metres above sea level, now also the name of a stop of the Brienz Rothorn Railway (1341 m). The settlement is a Walser foundation, first recorded in 1306. At least seasonal use of the area is assumed for the late Roman period, as numerous local toponyms have Latin etymologies. The lower part of the settlement was formerly permanently inhabited, known by the name of Husstatt. It is now a seasonal pasture, divided into five lots or Stafel: Usweid (1350 m), Greesgi (1560 m), Rinderbiel (1760 m), Gummi (1820 m), and Obristen (also Ober Stafel, 1830 m). Substantial avalanche defenses were built after the winter 1942/3. There is a legend according to which Planalp was completely destroyed by avalanches, the only survivor being an infant boy found floating in its cradle in Lake Brienz. Since the identity of the infant was unknown, it was given the surname of Abplanalp, ab being Latin for 'from'. As a Swiss-American surname, Abplanalp has also been simplified to Aplanalp or Planalp.

People with the surname:

- Fritz Abplanalp (1907–1977), Swiss woodcarver
- Robert Abplanalp (1922–2003), American inventor of the aerosol spray valve
- Cheryl Abplanalp (b. 1972), Team USA Handball player; the youngest member of Team USA in the 1996 Summer Olympics
