= Olo, South Sudan =

Olo is a town in Western Equatoria State, South Sudan.

Olo is located 27 miles (43 km) east of Maridi, and is on the Juba road, at the junction with the Road which goes into Uganda.

Olo is also the seat of the Anglican diocese of Olo. The bishop of the Diocese of Olo (formed 2009) is Bishop Tandema Obed Andrew.
