= Sis, Azerbaijan =

Sis
- Municipality
- Location within Azerbaijan
- Coordinates: 40°45′52″N 48°34′51″E
- Country: Azerbaijan
- Rayon: Shamakhi

Population
  - Total: 346
- Time zone: UTC+4 (AZT)
  - Summer (DST): UTC+5 (AZT)

Sis is a village and municipality in the Shamakhi Rayon of Azerbaijan. It has a population of 346.
