= Alavala =

- Village
- Interactive map of Alavala
- Location in Andhra Pradesh, India
- Coordinates: 16°10′30″N 79°53′41″E
- Country: India
- State: Andhra Pradesh
- District: Palnadu
- Mandal: Rompicherla

Government
  - Type: Panchayati raj
  - Body: Alavala gram panchayat

Area
  - Total: 966 ha (2,390 acres)

Population (2011)
  - Total: 2,478
  - Density: 257/km^{2} (664/sq mi)

Languages
  - Official: Telugu
- Time zone: UTC+5:30 (IST)
- PIN: 522xxx
- Area code: +91–
- Vehicle registration: AP

Alavala is a village in Palnadu district of the Indian state of Andhra Pradesh. It is located in Rompicherla mandal of Narasaraopet revenue division.

== Government and politics ==
Alavala gram panchayat is the local self-government of the village. It is divided into wards and each ward is represented by a ward member. The ward members are headed by a Sarpanch.
