= Bérat =

- Commune
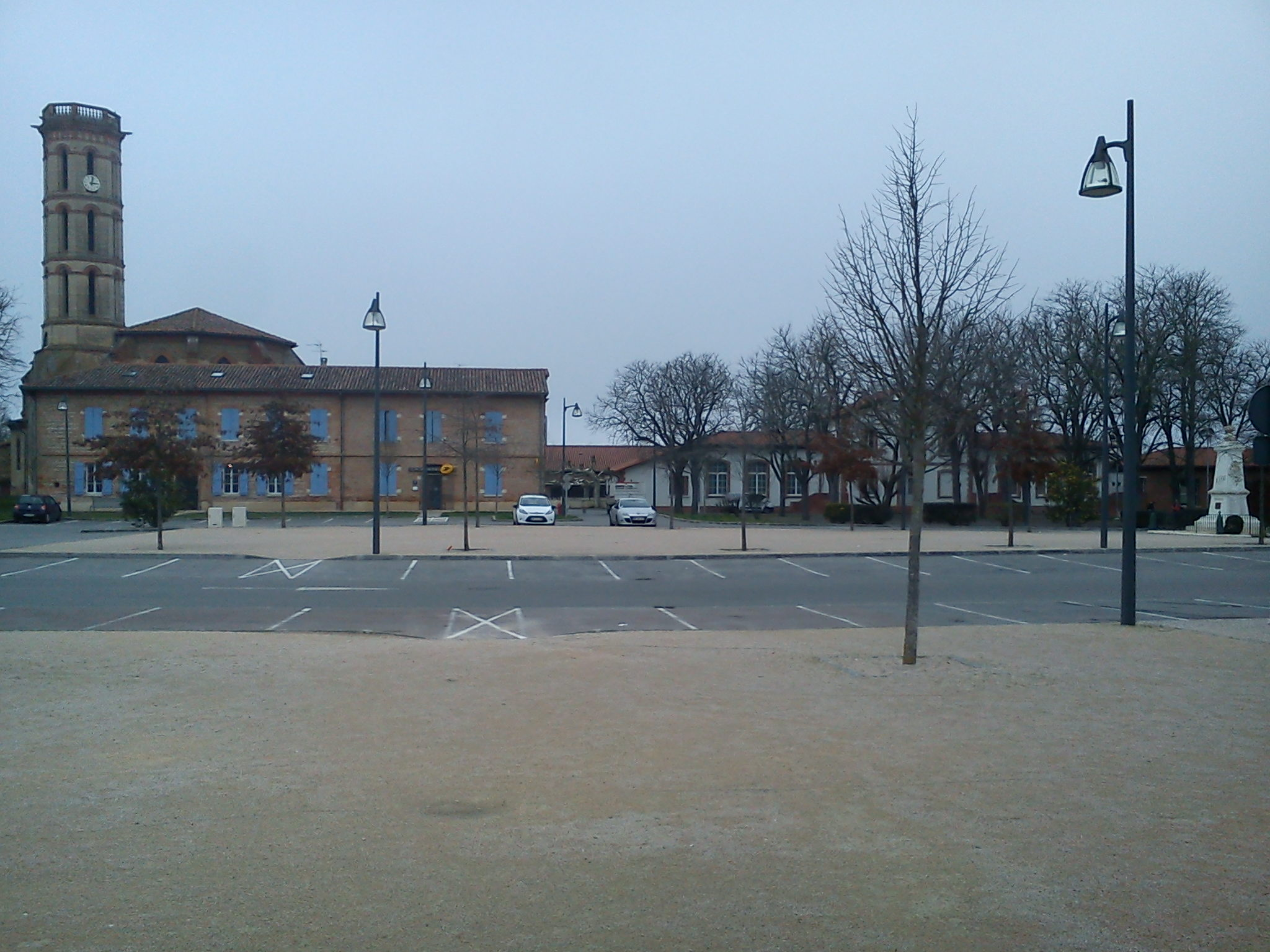
- A view within Bérat
- Location of Bérat
- Location within France Location within Occitanie
- Coordinates: 43°22′43″N 1°10′36″E
- Country: France
- Region: Occitania
- Department: Haute-Garonne
- Arrondissement: Muret
- Canton: Cazères

Government
  - Mayor (2020–2026): Paul-Marie Blanc
- Area^{1}: 24.46 km^{2} (9.44 sq mi)
- Elevation: 248 m (814 ft)
- Highest elevation: 265 m (869 ft)
- Lowest elevation: 202 m (663 ft)
- Population (2023): 3,087
  - Density: 126.2/km^{2} (326.9/sq mi)
- Time zone: UTC+01:00 (CET)
  - Summer (DST): UTC+02:00 (CEST)
- INSEE/Postal code: 31065 /31370
- ^{1} French Land Register data, which excludes lakes, ponds, glaciers > 1 km^{2} (0.386 sq mi or 247 acres) and river estuaries.

Bérat is a village and commune in the Haute-Garonne department in southwestern France.

== Geography ==
The commune is traversed by the river Touch.

== Population ==
Historical population
Year	Pop.	±% p.a.
1968	804	—
1975	823	+0.33%
1982	980	+2.53%
1990	1,153	+2.05%
1999	1,407	+2.24%
2007	2,369	+6.73%
2012	2,806	+3.44%
2017	3,016	+1.45%
2023	3,087	+0.39%
Source: INSEE

== See also ==
- Communes of the Haute-Garonne department
