= Nokon =

- Village
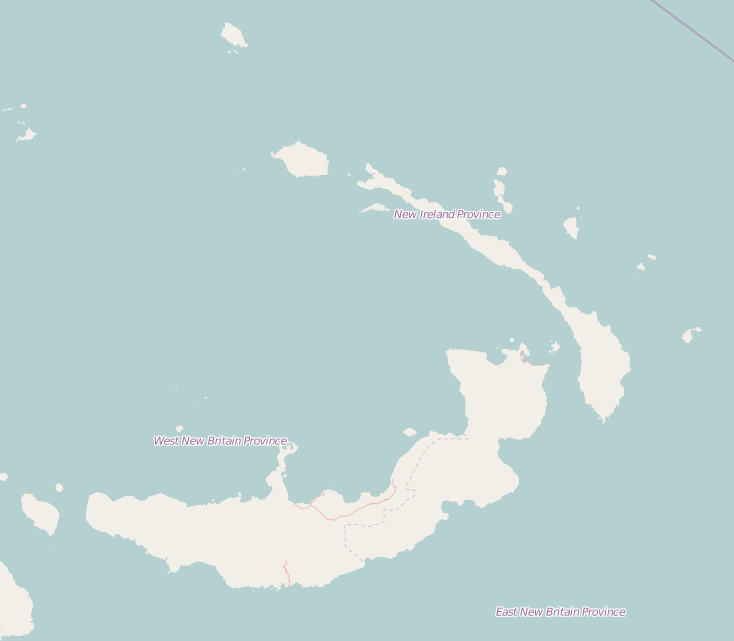
- Location
- Coordinates: 3°52′S 152°47′E
- Country: Papua New Guinea
- Province: New Ireland Province
- District: Namatanai District

Nokon is a village on the south-eastern coast of New Ireland, Papua New Guinea. According to Alexander H. Bolyanatz, "Tekedan, Himaul, and Nokon form something of a sociological cluster." It contains a United Church. It is located in Namatanai Rural LLG.
