= Ini, Gilan =

Ini ايني
- Village
- Location within Iran
- Coordinates: 36°44′00″N 50°08′00″E
- Country: Iran
- Province: Gilan
- County: Rudsar
- Bakhsh: Rahimabad
- Rural District: Shuil

Population (2006)
  - Total: 146
- Time zone: UTC+3:30 (IRST)
  - Summer (DST): UTC+4:30 (IRDT)

Ini (Persian: ايني, also Romanized as Īnī) is a village in Shuil Rural District, Rahimabad District, Rudsar County, Gilan Province, Iran. At the 2006 census, its population was 146, in 32 families.
