= Montgras =

- Commune
- Location of Montgras
- Location within France Location within Occitanie
- Coordinates: 43°27′15″N 1°03′26″E
- Country: France
- Region: Occitania
- Department: Haute-Garonne
- Arrondissement: Muret
- Canton: Cazères

Government
  - Mayor (2020–2026): Eric Castillon
- Area^{1}: 3.99 km^{2} (1.54 sq mi)
- Elevation: 299 m (981 ft)
- Highest elevation: 331 m (1,086 ft)
- Lowest elevation: 229 m (751 ft)
- Population (2023): 116
  - Density: 29.1/km^{2} (75.3/sq mi)
- Time zone: UTC+01:00 (CET)
  - Summer (DST): UTC+02:00 (CEST)
- INSEE/Postal code: 31382 /31370
- ^{1} French Land Register data, which excludes lakes, ponds, glaciers > 1 km^{2} (0.386 sq mi or 247 acres) and river estuaries.

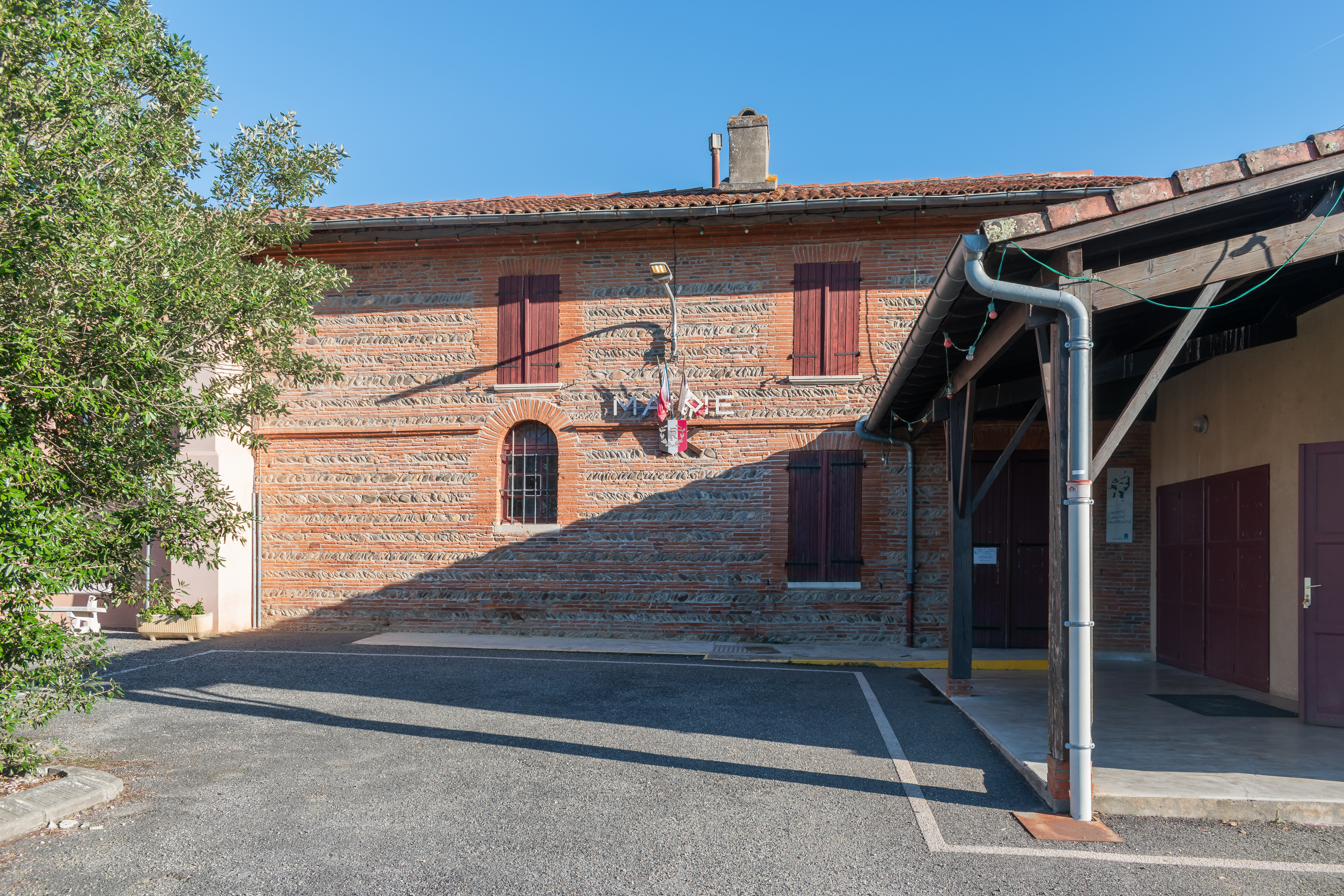
The town hall of Montgras, Haute-Garonne, France

Montgras is a commune in the Haute-Garonne department of southwestern France.

== Population ==
Historical population
Year	Pop.	±% p.a.
1968	65	—
1975	64	−0.22%
1982	62	−0.45%
1990	52	−2.17%
1999	46	−1.35%
2007	87	+8.29%
2012	95	+1.77%
2017	106	+2.22%
2023	116	+1.51%
Source: INSEE

== See also ==
- Communes of the Haute-Garonne department
