= Heddeh =

Heddeh حده
- Village
- Location within Iran
- Coordinates: 31°23′34″N 48°42′58″E
- Country: Iran
- Province: Khuzestan
- County: Ahvaz
- Bakhsh: Central
- Rural District: Anaqcheh

Population (2006)
  - Total: 396
- Time zone: UTC+3:30 (IRST)
  - Summer (DST): UTC+4:30 (IRDT)

Heddeh (Persian: حده, also Romanized as Ḩeddeh and Ḩaddeh) is a village in Anaqcheh Rural District, in the Central District of Ahvaz County, Khuzestan Province, Iran. At the 2006 census, its population was 396 divided into 50 families.
