= Kafak =

Kafak كفاك
- village
- Location within Iran
- Coordinates: 36°11′56″N 52°50′55″E
- Country: Iran
- Province: Mazandaran
- County: North Savadkuh
- Rural District: Lafur

Population (2016)
  - Total: 45
- Time zone: UTC+3:30 (IRST)

Kafak (Persian: كفاك, also Romanized as Kafāk) is a village in Lafur Rural District, North Savadkuh County, Mazandaran Province, Iran. At the 2016 census, its population was 45, in 17 families. Up from 35 in 2006.
