= Oo, Indonesia =

Village in Sigi Regency, Central Sulawesi, Indonesia

Coordinates: 01°35′01″S 120°01′36″E

Oo is a populated place in the Sigi Regency, Central Sulawesi province of Indonesia.
