= Noon, Washington =

Unincorporated community in Washington, US

- Unincorporated community
- Location within Washington (state)
- Coordinates: 48°48′14″N 122°23′55″W
- Country: United States
- State: Washington
- County: Whatcom
- Elevation: 338 ft (103 m)
- Time zone: UTC-8 (Pacific (PST))
  - Summer (DST): UTC-7 (PDT)
- Area code(s): 360, 564
- GNIS feature ID: 1511186

Noon is an unincorporated community in Whatcom County, in the U.S. state of Washington.

The community was named after A. F. Noon.
