= Otto, West Virginia =

Otto
- Unincorporated community
- Location within the state of West Virginia Otto (the United States)
- Coordinates: 38°45′8″N 81°13′15″W
- Country: United States
- State: West Virginia
- County: Roane
- Elevation: 771 ft (235 m)
- Time zone: UTC-5 (Eastern (EST))
  - Summer (DST): UTC-4 (EDT)
- GNIS ID: 1555284

Otto is an unincorporated community in Roane County, West Virginia, United States.
