= Vokov =

- Municipality
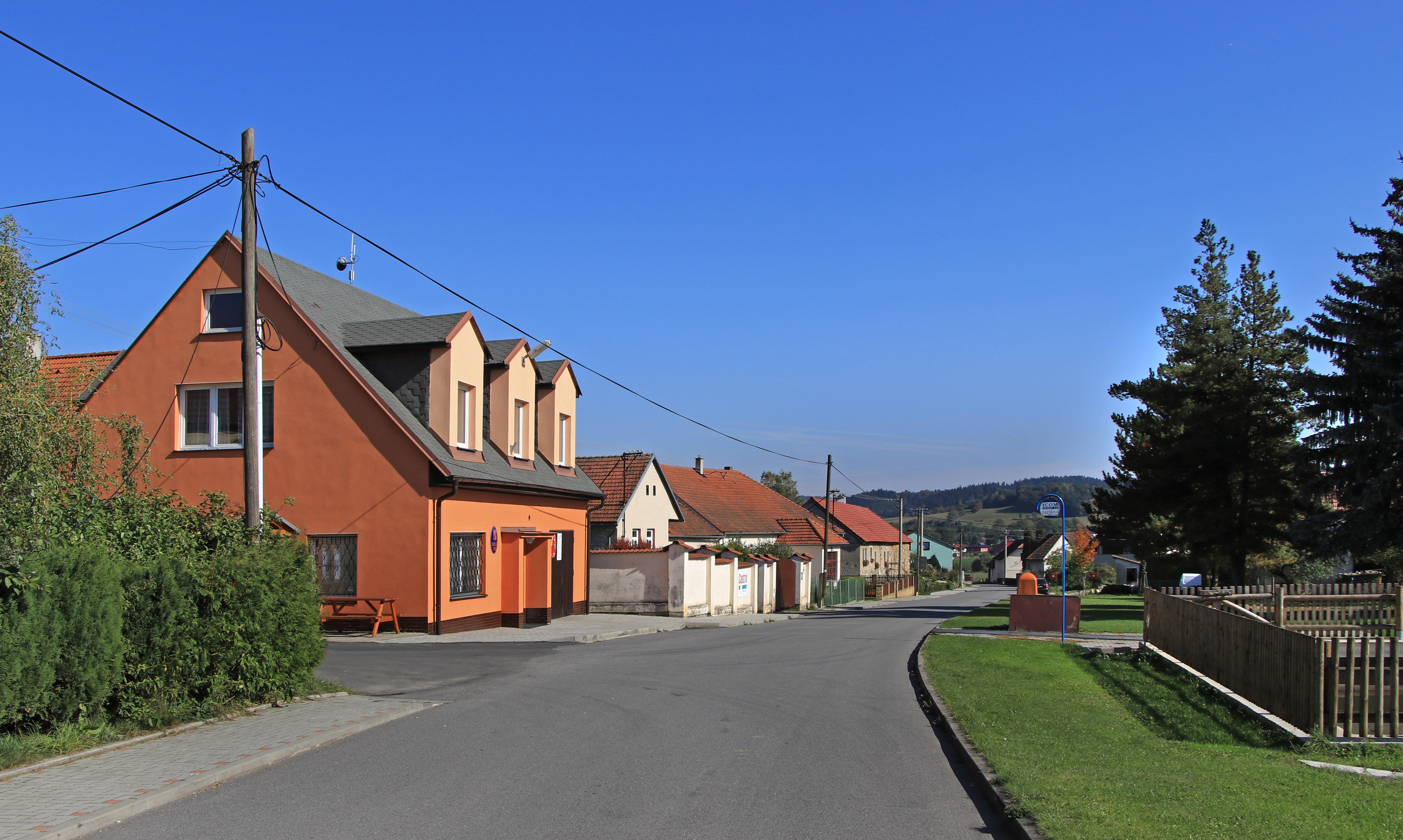
- Main street

- Location in the Czech Republic
- Coordinates: 49°23′44″N 15°13′11″E
- Country: Czech Republic
- Region: Vysočina
- District: Pelhřimov
- First mentioned: 1355

Area
  - Total: 2.66 km^{2} (1.03 sq mi)
- Elevation: 531 m (1,742 ft)

Population (2026-01-01)
  - Total: 210
  - Density: 79/km^{2} (200/sq mi)
- Time zone: UTC+1 (CET)
  - Summer (DST): UTC+2 (CEST)
- Postal code: 393 01
- Website: www.obecvokov.cz

Vokov is a municipality and village in Pelhřimov District in the Vysočina Region of the Czech Republic. It has about 200 inhabitants.

Vokov lies approximately 4 kilometres (2 mi) south of Pelhřimov, 28 km (17 mi) west of Jihlava, and 96 km (60 mi) south-east of Prague.

== Demographics ==
Historical population
Year	Pop.	±%
1869	143	—
1880	157	+9.8%
1890	136	−13.4%
1900	160	+17.6%
1910	169	+5.6%
1921	163	−3.6%
1930	152	−6.7%
1950	115	−24.3%
1961	109	−5.2%
1970	96	−11.9%
1980	71	−26.0%
1991	51	−28.2%
2001	68	+33.3%
2011	108	+58.8%
2021	197	+82.4%
Source: Censuses
