= Asasa =

Asasa አሳሳ
- Town
- Location within Ethiopia
- Coordinates: 7°6′0″N 39°11′40″E
- Country: Ethiopia
- Region: Oromia
- Zone: west Arsi Zone
- Elevation: 2,367 m (7,766 ft)

Population (2005)
  - Total: 19,506
- Time zone: UTC+3 (EAT)
- Climate: Cwb

Asasa is a town in southeastern Ethiopia. Located in the West Arsi Zone of the Oromia Region, this town has a latitude and longitude of 07°06′N 39°12′E with an elevation of 2367 meters above sea level. It is the administrative center of Gedeb Asasa woreda.

Asasa was the location of the Kulumsa experimental farm, a project of Chilalo Agricultural Development Union that ran from 1966 to 1968. In the late 1989s, a Skills Training Center operated in this town, teaching useful trades like pot-making.

Based on figures from the Ethiopian Central Statistical Agency in 2005, Asasa has an estimated total population of 19,506 of whom 9,865 are men and 9,641 are women. The 1994 national census reported this town had a total population of 10,903 of whom 5,350 were men and 5,553 women.
