= Sajas =

- Commune
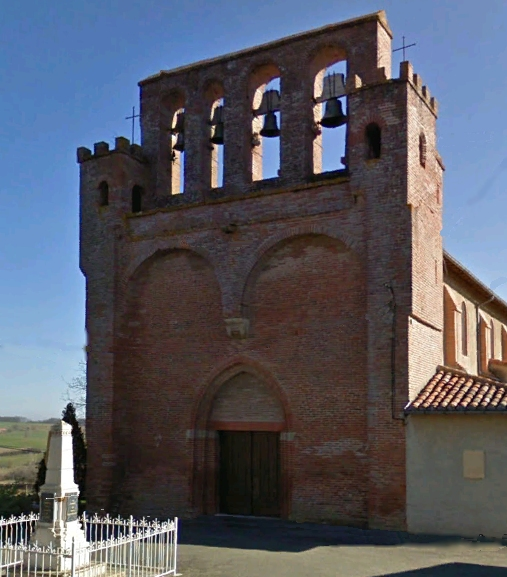
- The church in Sajas
- Location of Sajas
- Location within France Location within Occitanie
- Coordinates: 43°22′39″N 1°01′17″E
- Country: France
- Region: Occitania
- Department: Haute-Garonne
- Arrondissement: Muret
- Canton: Cazères

Government
  - Mayor (2020–2026): Didier Genau
- Area^{1}: 5 km^{2} (1.9 sq mi)
- Elevation: 330 m (1,080 ft)
- Highest elevation: 345 m (1,132 ft)
- Lowest elevation: 248 m (814 ft)
- Population (2023): 104
  - Density: 21/km^{2} (54/sq mi)
- Time zone: UTC+01:00 (CET)
  - Summer (DST): UTC+02:00 (CEST)
- INSEE/Postal code: 31520 /31370
- ^{1} French Land Register data, which excludes lakes, ponds, glaciers > 1 km^{2} (0.386 sq mi or 247 acres) and river estuaries.

Sajas is a commune in the Haute-Garonne department in southwestern France.

== Population ==
Historical population
Year	Pop.	±% p.a.
1968	96	—
1975	65	−5.42%
1982	62	−0.67%
1990	71	+1.71%
1999	82	+1.61%
2007	90	+1.17%
2012	112	+4.47%
2017	125	+2.22%
2023	104	−3.02%
Source: INSEE

== Personalities ==
Sajas is infamous for producing the impostor Arnaud du Tilh who played a major role in the 16th century story of Martin Guerre.

== See also ==
- Communes of the Haute-Garonne department
