= Noagaon, Sarail =

Naogaon নোয়াগাঁও
- Location in Bangladesh
- Coordinates: 24°6.9′N 91°8.6′E
- Country: Bangladesh
- Division: Chittagong Division
- District: Brahmanbaria District
- Upazila: Sarail Upazila

Population (2011)
  - Total: 37,863
- Time zone: UTC+6 (BST)
- Postal code: 3430
- Website: official website

Noagaon is a village in Noagaon Union, Sarail Upazila, Brahmanbaria District in the Chittagong Division of eastern Bangladesh.

== See also ==
- List of villages in Bangladesh
