= Lel, Gaynsky District =

Lel Лель
- Settlement
- Location within Perm Krai Location within Russia
- Coordinates: 60°39′N 54°34′E
- Country: Russia
- Region: Perm Krai
- District: Gaynsky District
- Time zone: UTC+5:00

Lel (Russian: Лель) is a rural locality (a settlement) in Verkhnestaritskoye Rural Settlement, Gaynsky District, Perm Krai, Russia. The population was 163 as of 2010. There are 3 streets.

== Geography ==
Lel is located 76 km northeast of Gayny (the district's administrative centre) by road. Lunym is the nearest rural locality.
