= Lel, Alicante =

Location in Alicante, Spain

Coordinates: 38°26′57″N 001°01′20″W

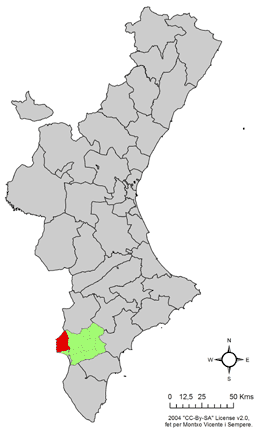
Localització del Pinós respecte el País Valencià

Lel is a populated place in the Province of Alicante, in the autonomous Valencian Community of Spain. It is located northeast of the town of Pinoso and southwest of the municipality of Salinas.
