= Illi, Iran =

Illi ايللي
- Village
- Location within Iran
- Coordinates: 39°05′06″N 47°26′50″E
- Country: Iran
- Province: East Azerbaijan
- County: Kaleybar
- Bakhsh: Abish Ahmad
- Rural District: Abish Ahmad

Population (2006)
  - Total: 212
- Time zone: UTC+3:30 (IRST)
  - Summer (DST): UTC+4:30 (IRDT)

Illi (Persian: ايللي, also Romanized as Īllī) is a village in Abish Ahmad Rural District, Abish Ahmad District, Kaleybar County, East Azerbaijan Province, Iran. At the 2006 census, its population was 212, in 39 families.
