= Illi, Armenia =

Village in Shirak, Armenia

Illi Իլլի
- Location within Armenia Location within Shirak
- Coordinates: 40°55′N 43°49′E
- Country: Armenia
- Marz (Province): Shirak
- Time zone: UTC+4 ( )
  - Summer (DST): UTC+5 ( )

Illi (also, Illi Karakilisa; Armenian: Իլլի) is a town in the Shirak Province of Armenia.
