= Pap, Hungary =

Coordinates: 48°13′N 22°09′E

Pap
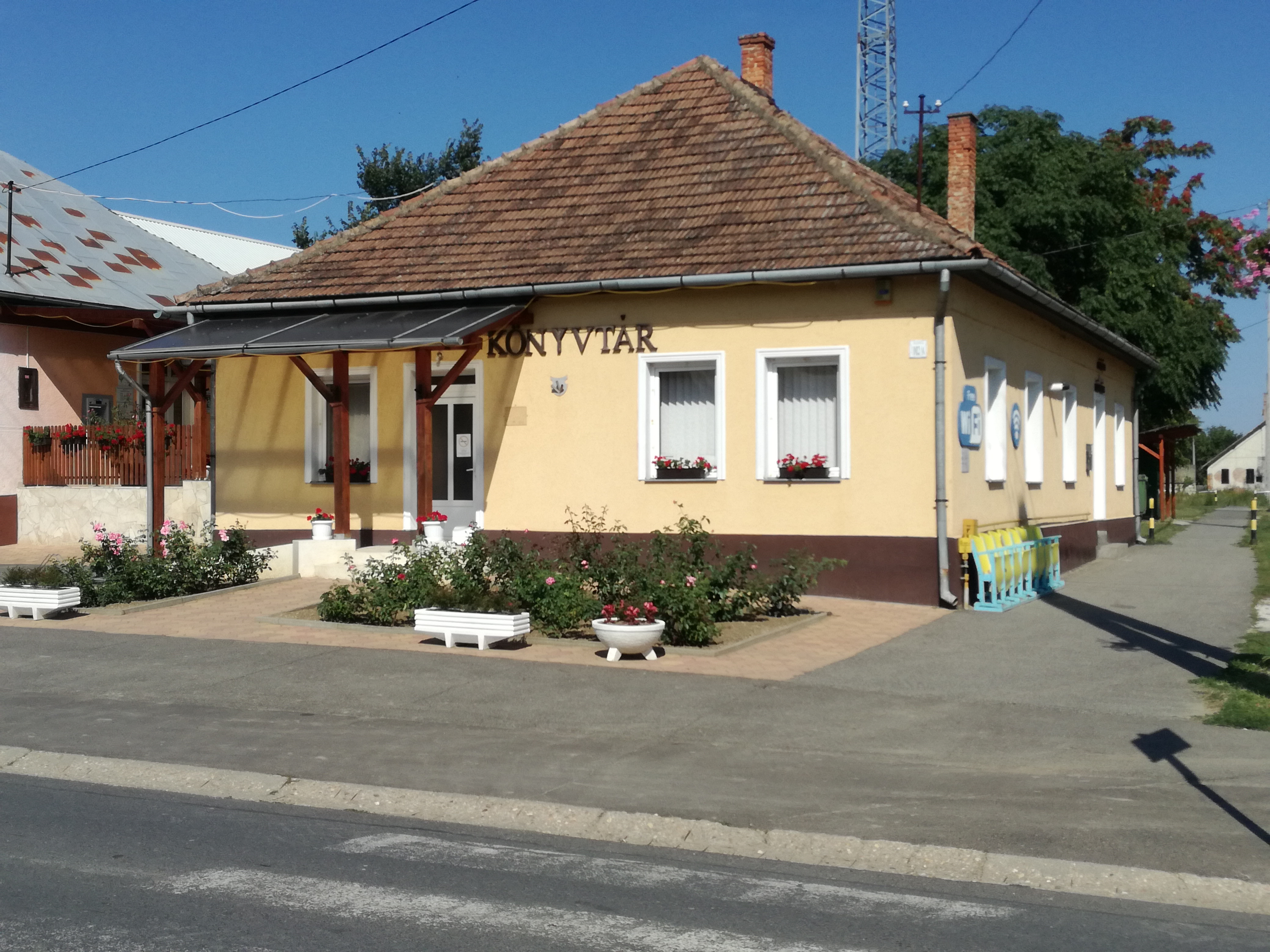

- Coat of arms
- Interactive map of Pap
- Country: Hungary
- County: Szabolcs-Szatmár-Bereg

Area
  - Total: 17.15 km^{2} (6.62 sq mi)

Population (2015)
  - Total: 1,805
  - Density: 105.25/km^{2} (272.6/sq mi)
- Time zone: UTC+1 (CET)
  - Summer (DST): UTC+2 (CEST)
- Postal code: 4631
- Area code: 45

Location of Szabolcs-Szatmar-Bereg county in Hungary

Pap is a village in Szabolcs-Szatmár-Bereg county, in the Northern Great Plain region of eastern Hungary.

== Geography ==
It covers an area of 17.15 km^{2} (7 sq mi) and has a population of 1805 people (2015).
