= Illy (disambiguation) =

Illy is an Italian coffee company.

Illy may also refer to:

- Illy, Ardennes, commune in the Ardennes department in northern France
- Andrea Illy, Italian businessman
- Illy (rapper), Australian hip hop artist from Melbourne, Victoria
