= Mroum commune, Cambodia =

Mroum (Khmer: ម្រោម) is a khum (commune) in Angkor Chey District, Kampot Province, Cambodia.

== Administration ==
As of 2020, Mroum Commune has 6 phums (villages) as follows.

Code	Village	Khmer
07010701	Preah Aongkar	ព្រះឱង្ការ
07010702	Mroum	ម្រោម
07010703	Trapeang Phnael	ត្រពាំងផ្នែល
07010704	Chheu Teal	ឈើទាល
07010705	Kok	គក
07010706	Phnum Chhmar	ភ្នំឆ្មារ
