= Illi, Võru County =

Village in Estonia

Illi
- Location within Estonia
- Coordinates: 57°42′57″N 27°19′18″E
- Country: Estonia
- County: Võru County
- Municipality: Võru Parish

Population
  - Total: 35

Illi is a village in Estonia, in Võru Parish, which belongs to Võru County.
