= Murum Village =

Village in Maharashtra

Murum Hol Murum
- Village
- Location in Maharashtra, India
- Coordinates: 18°4′19.4″N 74°18′10.24″E
- Country: India
- State: Maharashtra
- District: Pune
- Tahsil: Baramati
- Elevation: 540 m (1,770 ft)

Population (2011)
  - Total: 5,744

Languages
  - Official: Marathi
- Time zone: UTC+5:30 (IST)
- PIN: 412306
- Telephone code: 02112

Murum is a village located in the Baramati Taluka of Pune District in the state of Maharashtra, India. Situated approximately 100 kilometers southeast of Pune city and 34 kilometers from Baramati, Murum lies in the (Paschim Maharashtra) western region of Maharashtra.

== Demographics ==
Total Population

| Villages | Population |
|---|---|
| Murum | 5744 |

Census data 2011

| Particulars | Total | Male | Female |
|---|---|---|---|
| Total No. of Houses | 1232 | - | - |
| Population | 5744 | 2985 | 2759 |
| Child (0-6) | 592 | 318 | 274 |
| Schedule Caste | 914 | 460 | 454 |
| Schedule Tribe | 60 | 34 | 26 |
| Literacy | 82.53% | 89.05% | 75.53% |
| Total Workers | 2441 | 1724 | 717 |
| Main Worker | 2185 | 0 | 0 |
| Marginal Worker | 256 | 77 | 179 |

== Maps ==
"Murum Village" (Map). Google Maps.

Detailed Murum Map using Bharat Maps
