= Montberaud =

- Commune
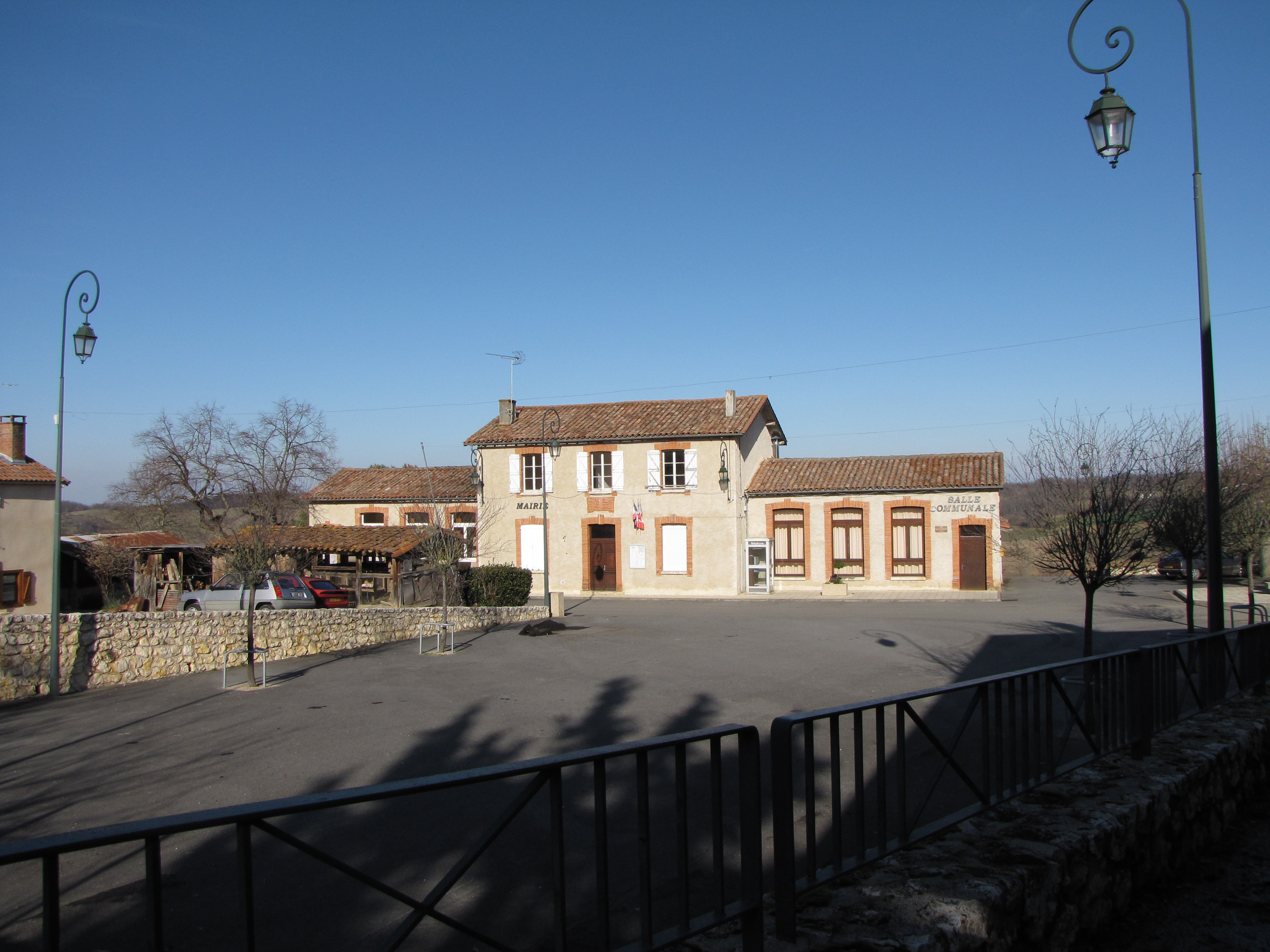
- Town hall
- Location of Montberaud
- Location within France Location within Occitanie
- Coordinates: 43°09′21″N 1°08′38″E
- Country: France
- Region: Occitania
- Department: Haute-Garonne
- Arrondissement: Muret
- Canton: Cazères

Government
  - Mayor (2020–2026): Raymond Denjean
- Area^{1}: 15.87 km^{2} (6.13 sq mi)
- Elevation: 400 m (1,300 ft)
- Highest elevation: 474 m (1,555 ft)
- Lowest elevation: 265 m (869 ft)
- Population (2023): 192
  - Density: 12.1/km^{2} (31.3/sq mi)
- Time zone: UTC+01:00 (CET)
  - Summer (DST): UTC+02:00 (CEST)
- INSEE/Postal code: 31362 /31220
- ^{1} French Land Register data, which excludes lakes, ponds, glaciers > 1 km^{2} (0.386 sq mi or 247 acres) and river estuaries.

Montberaud (French pronunciation: [mɔ̃bəʁo]) is a commune of the Toulouse Greater urban area in the Haute-Garonne department of southwestern France.

== Population ==
Historical population
Year	Pop.	±% p.a.
1968	195	—
1975	170	−1.94%
1982	152	−1.59%
1990	167	+1.18%
1999	166	−0.07%
2007	204	+2.61%
2012	216	+1.15%
2017	211	−0.47%
2023	192	−1.56%
Source: INSEE

== See also ==
- Communes of the Haute-Garonne department
