= Montesquieu-Volvestre =

- Commune
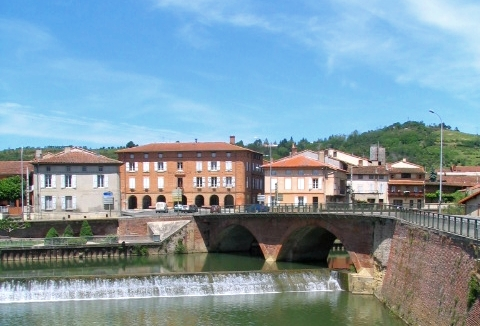
- Town hall

- Coat of arms
- Location of Montesquieu-Volvestre
- Location within France Location within Occitanie
- Coordinates: 43°12′31″N 1°13′50″E
- Country: France
- Region: Occitania
- Department: Haute-Garonne
- Arrondissement: Muret
- Canton: Auterive
- Intercommunality: Volvestre

Government
  - Mayor (2020–2026): Frédéric Bienvenu
- Area^{1}: 59.82 km^{2} (23.10 sq mi)
- Elevation: 226 m (741 ft)
- Highest elevation: 523 m (1,716 ft)
- Lowest elevation: 208 m (682 ft)
- Population (2023): 3,050
  - Density: 51.0/km^{2} (132/sq mi)
- Time zone: UTC+01:00 (CET)
  - Summer (DST): UTC+02:00 (CEST)
- INSEE/Postal code: 31375 /31310
- ^{1} French Land Register data, which excludes lakes, ponds, glaciers > 1 km^{2} (0.386 sq mi or 247 acres) and river estuaries.

Montesquieu-Volvestre is a commune in the Haute-Garonne department of south-western France.

== Population ==
Historical population
Year	Pop.	±% p.a.
1968	1,924	—
1975	1,950	+0.19%
1982	2,088	+0.98%
1990	2,117	+0.17%
1999	2,314	+0.99%
2007	2,710	+1.99%
2012	3,158	+3.11%
2017	3,032	−0.81%
2023	3,050	+0.10%
Source: INSEE

== Notable people ==
- Stella Blandy (1836-1925), woman of letters, feminist

== See also ==
- Communes of the Haute-Garonne department
