= Kék =

Village in Hungary

Coordinates: 48°07′N 21°53′E

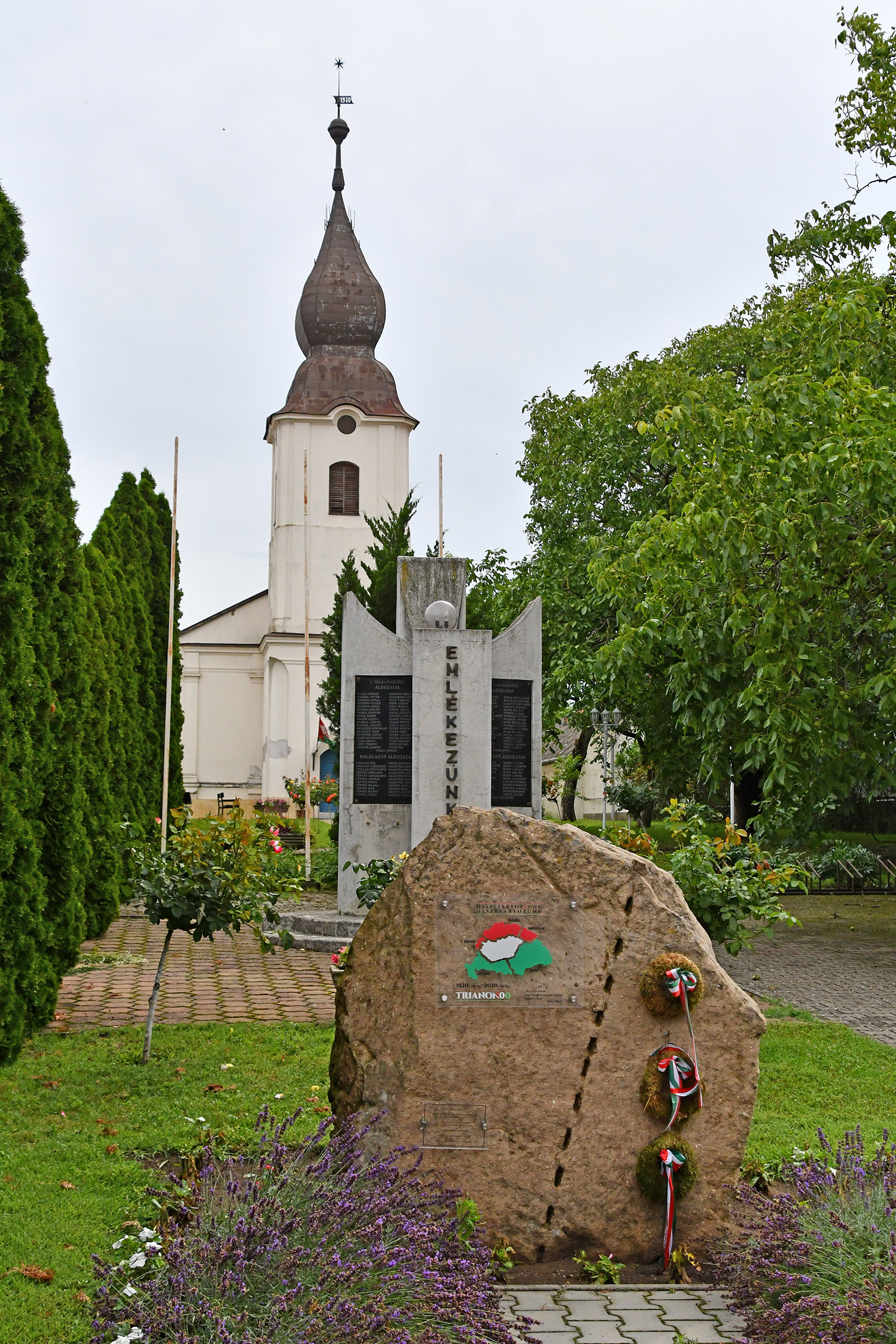
Reformed church in Kék

Kék is a village in Szabolcs-Szatmár-Bereg county, in the Northern Great Plain region of eastern Hungary. The village has nearly 2,000 inhabitants.
