= Elie (given name) =

Elie is a masculine given name. For the French version, see Élie. Notable people with the name include:

== A ==
- Elie Abadie (born 1960), rabbi in the United Arab Emirates
- Elie Abel (1920–2004), Canadian journalist
- Elie Adda (1892–1975), Egyptian fencer
- Elie Aghnides (1901–1988), Greek engineer and inventor
- Elie Aiboy (born 1979), Indonesian football player
- Elie Apper (born 1933), Belgian saxophonist
- Elie Azagury (1918–2009), Moroccan architect

== B ==
- Elie Bouka (born 1992), Canadian football player
- Elie Brun (born 1948), French politician
- Elie Buconyori, Burundi bishop

== C ==
- Elie Carafoli (1901–1983), Romanian engineer
- Elie Che (1998–2020), English model, performer, and trans activist
- Elie Aron Cohen (1909–1993), Dutch doctor
- Elie Cristo-Loveanu (1893–1964), Romanian artist

== F ==
- Elie Fahed (born 1989), Lebanese filmmaker
- Elie Farah (1909–2003), Lebanese archbishop
- Elie Ferzli (born 1949), Lebanese politician

== G ==
- Elie Guillemer (1904–1987), French cyclist

== H ==
- Elie Hervier (1896–1987), French sculptor
- Elie Hirschfeld (born 1949), American businessman
- Elie Hobeika (1956–2002), Lebanese military leader
- Elie Honig (born 1977), American attorney
- Elie Horn (born 1944), Brazilian businessman

== I ==
- Elie Ikangu (born 1986), French football player

== K ==
- Elie Katz (born 1974), American politician and businessman
- Elie Kaunfer (born 1973), American rabbi
- Elie Kayrouz (born 1959), Lebanese politician
- Elie Kedourie (1926–1992), British historian
- Elie Konki (born 1992), French boxer

== L ==
- Elie Lainé (1829–1911), French landscape architect
- Elie A. F. La Vallette (1790–1862), American admiral
- Elie Lotar (originally Eliazar Lotar Theodorescu; 1905–1969), French and Romanian photographer and cinematographer

== M ==
- Elie Martel (1934–2025), Canadian politician
- Elie Mechantaf (born 1970), Lebanese basketball player
- Elie Melia (1915–1988), Georgian priest and historian
- Elie Mitri (born 1980), Lebanese actor

== N ==
- Elie Naasan (1931–2015), Lebanese wrestler
- Elie Nadelman (1882–1946), American sculptor
- Elie Nakouzi (born 1969), Lebanese television presenter
- Elie Ngoyi (born 1988), Canadian football player
- Elie Norbert (born 1984), Malagasy judoka
- Elie N'Tamon (born 2004), Ivorian footballer

== O ==
- Elie Ofek, Israeli-American economist

== R ==
- Elie Radu (1853–1931), Romanian civil engineer and academic
- Elie Raffoul, known as Eric Rouleau (1926–2015), Egyptian French journalist and diplomat
- Elie Rajaonarison (1951–2010), Malagasy poet
- Elie Rekhess (born 1945), Israeli historian
- Elie Rustom (born 1987), Lebanese basketball player

== S ==
- Elie Saab (born 1964), Lebanese fashion designer
- Elie Salem (born 1930), Lebanese academic and politician
- Elie Samaha (born 1955), Lebanese-born American film producer
- Elie Seckbach, American sports journalist
- Elie A. Shneour (1925–2015), French-born American scientist and author
- Elie Siegmeister (1909–1991), American composer and author
- Elie Solier (1914–1984), Caledonian lawyer and politician
- Elie Stephan (born 1981), Lebanese basketball player
- Elie Susman (1880–1957), South African businessman

== T ==
- Elie Tahari (born 1952), Israeli fashion designer
- Elie Track, American physicist

== W ==
- Elie Wiesel (1928–2016), Romanian-born American writer and Nobel laureate

== See also ==
- Elie (surname)
- Elie (disambiguation)
