= Rouleau =

Rouleau (French for "roll" or "roller"; plural rouleaux) can refer to:

== People ==
- For a list of people with Rouleau as a surname, see Rouleau (surname).
- Alexandre Rouleau, Canadian ice hockey player
- Alfred Rouleau, businessman
- Joseph Rouleau, opera singer
- Duncan Rouleau, comic book writer and artist

== Places ==
- Rouleau, Saskatchewan

== Things ==
- rouleaux, a stack of red blood cells
- (textiles) A decorative technique that involves creating patterns with piping, cording or bias tape. A rouleau loop uses the same cord or piping as a way of fastening buttons, most notably down the back of bridal gowns.

== See also ==
- Reuleaux (disambiguation)
