= Rouleau (surname) =

Rouleau is a surname of French origin.

== List ==
- Adolphe Rouleau (1867–1937), French fencer
- Alexandre Rouleau (born 1983), ice hockey player
- Alfred Rouleau CC GOQ (1915–1985), Canadian businessman
- Chantal Rouleau, Canadian politician
- Charles Rouleau (1840–1901), Canadian politician, lawyer, judge
- Chris Rouleau (born 1976), a.k.a. Blaze Ya Dead Homie, U.S. rapper
- Denis Rouleau CMM MSM CD, Vice Admiral of the Royal Canadian Navy.
- Duncan Rouleau, U.S. comic book author.
- Eric Rouleau (1926–2015), French journalist and diplomat
- Ernest Rouleau (1916–1991), Canadian botanist; his botanical abbreviation is Rouleau
- Felix-Raymond-Marie Rouleau OP (1866-1931), Canadian Roman Catholic cardinal
- François Fortunat Rouleau (1849-1907), Canadian politician
- Guy Rouleau (politician) (1923–2010), Canadian politician
- Guy Rouleau (ice hockey) (1965–2008), Canadian hockey player
- Joseph Rouleau CC GOQ (1929–2019), French-Canadian bass opera singer.
- Martin Couture-Rouleau (died 2014) a.k.a. Ahmad LeConverti, radicalized Canadian Islamist convert.
- Michel Rouleau (born 1944), Canadian ice hockey player
- Paul Rouleau, Canadian judge
- Raymond Rouleau (1904–1981), Belgian actor-director
