= The 4 Cats =

Lebanese pop band

- Origin: Lebanon
- Genres: Arabic Pop
- Years active: 1998–2011
- Labels: Musicbox International; Rotana
- Members: Aline Ourfalian; Murielle Ghanem; Reen Ashkar; Kristen A'akl
- Past members: Rola Bahnam; Dalida Chammai; Zeina Layoun; Chantal Kayssar; Nicole Saba; Nesreen Zreik; Nathalie Barakat; Perla Chalala; Rana Tarsissi; Joyce; Maya Diab; Raya Chammai; Eliana Abi Daher

The 4 Cats (Arabic: الفور كاتس, romanized: Al-Fawr Kāts) is a Lebanese band made up of four female singers. The 4 Cats was the first all-female Lebanese pop group. Their debut studio album Tick Tick remained at number one on Arabic top charts for more than four months and more than one million copies of it were sold. The members in the band have changed frequently and until today (2016).

== Career ==
=== 1998–2001: Formation, debut album, new members ===
The group was formed by Ghassan Rahbani in 1998 after noticing that the Arab world lacked such a kind of bands. He chose four girls to form the group that were Rola Bahnam, Dalida Chammai, Zeina Leyon and Chantal Kayssar. Their songs are mostly composed by Elias Rahbani but re-mastered into modern versions. They released their debut single "A'chra, Hda'ch, Tna'ch (10, 11, 12)" alongside a music video, the song was the lead single from their debut studio album Tick Tick. Later, Rola left the group due to family issues, and was replaced by Nicole Saba and continued working on their first album. The second and third singles of the album titled "Ya Nassini" and "Kan El Zaman" were released.

Following the release of their debut album, Chantal Kayssar left the group after her marriage to Elie Nakouzi and was replaced by Perla Chalala. In summer 2000, they released the lead single "Layl Nhar" of their second studio album of the same name, the choreography and dance for the music video were made by Kimberley Morrow who appeared in Will Smith's music video for "Wild Wild West". The final single "Ma Ba'a Eida" was released in winter 2000. In October 2001, the girls were supposed to release a new album, however, the released date was changed after Nicole, Perla and Zeina left the group.

=== 2002–2005: Tal Intizari, Ya Antar and El Dinyi Heyk ===
In early 2002, three new girls has joined the group that were Maya Diab, Nesreen Zreik and Nathalie Barakat, replacing Nicole, Perla and Zeina. They released their third album Tal Intizari, with the lead single of the same name, and the second single "Rah Hebbak Aatool". The music video for the second single was released in 2003, just after Nathalie left the group, but it included a new girl, Rana, who performed Nathalie's part. Shortly after, Rana and Nesreen left the group, then, Perla came back but didn't continue, so she was replaced by a new member, Joyce.

In 2004, Dalida's sister, Raya, joined the group. Maya, Dalida, Raya and Joyce signed a contract with Rotana and released their first single with them entitled "Amelli Antar". And they also released their fourth studio album titled Ya Antar and shot a second video "Mashi Al Tafneis". After that, Dalida and Ghassan got married. At the end of 2004, the group released a single titled "Nehna Mnesrouk", which was a single from their fifth album, El Dinyi Heyk a song they also shot a video for. After the released of that album, Joyce left the group and was replaced by Aline Ourfalian.

=== 2007–2011: 4 Cats and a Lion, last album and new line-up ===
Before the release of their sixth album, it was announced that Dalida gave birth to twins, so she had to leave the group, she would be later replaced by Eliana Abi Daher who only appeared in the movie. In June 2007, they released their sixth and final studio album titled Wallat Kteer. In October 2007, they made their acting debut in a movie called 4 Cats and a Lion, which starred Egyptian actor Hany Ramzi. In 2009, only Maya appeared in a TV show called Kalam Neswan (Ladies Talk). In 2010, Maya left the group to start her solo career.

In early 2011, the group was dissolved after Maya left the group, but Aline continued with three new girls that are Moryal Ghanim, Reen Ashkar and Kristen A'akl. They released a music video for "Shouq Al Ayam" from their 2004 album, Ya Antar, and another video called "2013 Dance Mix" video however, both failed to attract viewership and sponsors.

== Discography ==
=== Studio albums ===
- Tick Tick (1998)
- Layl Nhar (2000)
- Tal Intizari (2002)
- Ya Antar (2004)
- El Dinyi Heik (2005)
- Wallat Kteer (2007)

=== Compilation albums ===
- Best of 4 Cats Vol.2
- Best of 4 Cats Vol.3

=== Singles ===
Title	Year	Album
"A'chra, Hda'ch, Tna'ch"	1998	Tick Tick
"Ya Nassini"	1999	Tick Tick
"Kan El Zaman"	1999	Tick Tick
"Layl Nhar"	2000	Layl Nhar
"Ma Ba'a Eida"	2000	Layl Nhar
"Tal Intizari"	2002	Tal Intizari
"Rah Hebbak Aatool"	2002	Tal Intizari
"Amelli Antar"	2004	Ya Antar
"Mashi Al Taffnes"	2004	Ya Antar
"El Dinyi Hayk"	2004	El Dinyi Hayk
"Nehna Mnesrouk"	2005	El Dinyi Hayk
"Wallat Kteer"	2007	Wallat Kteer
"Shouq Al Ayam"	2011	Ya Antar
