= Nalindele mask =

A Nalindele mask is a ceremonial mask representing a royal woman or a woman of high social standing. The Nalindele character is associated with the Luvale and with Mukanda initiation practices. The masks are held in museum collections. One belonging to the Livingstone Museum in Zambia was stolen in 1989 and returned in 1997 after an antiques dealer identified it in an International Council of Museums (ICOM) publication about missing cultural objects.

== Description and cultural significance ==
Nalindele masks portray a woman of elevated social status. Facial symbols distinguish the character from other female mask characters; these commonly include a cross enclosed within a circle on each cheek, indicating high rank. The masks are associated with Mukanda initiation practices, which include instruction through songs, dances and ritual performances. The Livingstone Museum specimen is made of wood, with facial markings, beads and plant-fibre hair.

== Museum collections ==
The Baltimore Museum of Art lists a Female Ancestor Mask (Nalindele) attributed to Luvale/Luchazi culture. A Nalindele mask appeared in the Fowler Museum at UCLA's 2007 exhibition Makishi: Mask Characters of Zambia. The exhibition presented 24 masks drawn from the museum's collections.

== Theft and return of the Livingstone Museum mask ==
=== Theft and recovery ===
A Nalindele mask along with other ceremonial objects was stolen from the Livingstone Museum on 28 June 1989. The museum reported the theft to Interpol and circulated photographs to international heritage organisations. In 1996, a Chilean antiques dealer acquired it in Paris. After learning from ICOM's One Hundred Missing Objects: Looting in Africa that it had been stolen, the dealer arranged for it to be sent from Chile to a colleague in Belgium for surrender to the authorities. Belgian police received the mask in June 1996. A formal restitution ceremony took place at the Zambian embassy in Brussels on 28 November 1997. Belgian authorities issued the documentation necessary for the mask's return to Zambia.

=== Return to the museum ===
The mask was temporarily held at the Royal Museum for Central Africa while transport was arranged. Manyando Mukela, director of the Nayuma Museum and vice-president of ICOM Zambia, carried it back to Zambia on 6 December 1997. The Livingstone Museum received the mask on 8 December 1997 at a ceremony that included dances and performances by Luvale community members. Curators found that part of its fibre hair had been cut and its original accession number, 9198B, removed. It was registered under the new number 11999 and placed on display. The museum also produced commemorative postcards. The mask was subsequently moved into storage for conservation.
