= Amal Hamadeh =

Comedian (b. 1976, d. 2018)

- Born: Amal Abdul Halim Hamadeh; April 1, 1976; Nabatieh, Lebanon
- Died: November 27, 2018 (aged 42); Nabatieh, Lebanon
- Occupations: Comedian; Internet celebrity; Critic; Satirist
- Years active: 2014–2018

Amal Abdul Halim Hamadeh (April 1, 1976 - November 27, 2018), simply known as Amal Hamadeh, was a Lebanese Internet celebrity, comedian, critic and satirist whose edgy, biting jokes and sarcastic comments on Arab celebrities, politics and culture became popular memes and catchphrases on social media and the internet in the Middle East.

== Career ==
Hamadeh's career began in March 2014 when she was randomly interviewed in Beirut by a field reporter from Lebanese Future TV, where she spoke about the situation in Lebanon, saying that "men are extinct," a phrase that would later become a viral catchphrase and meme on social media. The video was posted on YouTube and has so far attracted over one million views.

Her fame hugely increased in January 2015 after she started doing interviews for the celebrity website "Shorta al-Mashaheer" (Celebrity Police), where she provided funny, sarcastic and harsh criticism on Arab celebrities, culture and politics in Lebanon. Hamadeh repeatedly targeted celebrities like Elissa, Haifa Wehbe, Ahlam, Maya Diab and Myriam Fares, whom she repeatedly joked about for not revealing the identity of her husband, saying "Min Mekhdeh?" (Who are you married to?), a line that would become what's considered to be Hamadeh's second catchphrase.

Hamadeh's sense of humor attracted several media outlets in Lebanon thus she became a regular guest on several social and entertainment Lebanese TV shows including "Lel Nasher", "Bila Tashfeer," "Men Ha'ek" and others.

== Controversies ==
In May 2018, Lebanese singer Nawal Al Zoghbi filed a lawsuit against Hamadeh and Raghed Qais, the owner of "Shorta al-Mashaheer" website after Hamadeh joked about al Zoghby's problems with plastic surgeries. In the third interview with Qais' website, Hamadeh is seen jokingly telling Al Zoghbi to "rub her face with ice" so that her cheeks would become less fat because of injections.

== Death ==
On November 27, 2018, Hamadeh experienced a severe headache and vomiting. She died at the age of 42 on her way to Al Najdah Hospital in Nabatieh. It was later revealed that she died from a stroke.

=== Tributes ===
Hundreds of fans and celebrities took it to Twitter and other social media outlets to express their sadness and shock of Hamadeh's death. Lebanese singer Elissa was the first celebrity to tweet on her death, saying "I was deeply saddened when I heard about the death of Amal Hamadeh. Even though she was very harsh with her comments about celebrities, when it comes to death we can’t but pray for her soul ... may her soul rest in peace."
