= Nakouzi =

Nakouzi (Arabic: نقوزي) is a surname. Notable people with the surname include:

- Elie Nakouzi (born 1969), Lebanese television broadcaster and presenter
- Jean Nakouzi (born 1947), Lebanese wrestler
- Michel Nakouzi (born 1932), Lebanese wrestler
