= Aerator =

An aerator is a mechanical device used for aeration, or mixing air with another substance, such as water or soil.

The word aerator may also refer to:

- Faucet aerator
- Floating surface aerator, used in wastewater treatment
- Lawn aerator
- Surface or subsurface aerator, used in water aeration
- Wine aerator
