= St. Croix water crisis =

Water contamination event in the US Virgin Islands

- Duration: October 2023-January 2024
- Location: St. Croix, U.S. Virgin Islands; 17.7246°N 64.8348°W
- Type: Water contamination: Lead, copper
- Outcome: 3,800-4,000 homes contaminated with heavy metals in water; Public health state of emergency

The St. Croix water crisis became a significant public health crisis in October 2023, following reports that tap water provided by the Virgin Islands Water and Power Authority (WAPA) was contaminated with elevated levels of lead. Triggered by aging infrastructure, inadequate corrosion control, and consistent interruption in the distribution and flushing system, the crisis has disproportionately affected vulnerable communities, particularly low-income Black residents. Following the contamination of the tap water supplied from the Virgin Islands Water and Power Authority (WAPA) and Seven Seas Water, governmental intervention became necessary.

On October 30, 2023, US Virgin Islands Governor Albert Bryan declared a state of emergency for the district of St. Croix. The EPA conducted a Sequential Sampling Report to confirm the presence of contamination and offered guidance to the government on how to advise the community on staying safe during the crisis.

== Overview of St. Croix Water System ==
The WAPA public water system on St. Croix treats up to 3 million gallons of potable water per day and is over 60 years old. Since 2012, WAPA has been working with Seven Seas Facility to produce water using the technique of reverse osmosis to produce water. Seven seas performs the reverse osmosis and sends the water to WAPA Richmond storage tanks where chlorine, corrosion control and a chemical blend are added before the water hits the distribution system. This system supplies 30-45% of the island. However, a large part of the system has begun to deteriorate due to its age and lack of renovation and in August 2023, sargassum, a group of brown algae that provides a breeding ground for marine animals, was found in the pipes and water which became a point of concern for the community and used is as the source of discoloration and odor of the water. While free-floating sargassum plays an important ecological role, providing habitat, food, protection, and breeding grounds for many marine species, it can become hazardous when it enters water system pipelines. Sargassum contains high levels of arsenic, other heavy metals, organic matter, and marine debris, which pose serious health risks when decomposed within major water distribution systems serving large populations. In St. Croix, intermittent water shutoffs due to construction projects and a reduced flushing schedule caused by prolonged drought conditions contributed to the buildup of sargassum within the piping infrastructure, exacerbating contamination concerns. Under the Water Infrastructure Improvements for the Nation (WIIN) Act requirements under Section 1414 (c) of the Safe Drinking Water Act (SDWA), the EPA and public water systems are required to notify the public when data indicates hazardous levels of lead in drinking water. On October 14, 2023, WAPA sent out a notice to their consumers followed by targeted notification to affected residents the following week. In response, WAPA initiated flushing procedures in neighborhoods where elevated levels of lead were detected. As a precaution, the EPA advised residents to avoid consuming water from the distribution system until further testing and analysis of drinking water could be completed.

== WAPA Plan of Action ==
WAPA, in collaboration with the Department of Planning and Natural Resources (DPNR) and the University of the Virgin Islands, developed a sequential sampling plan to investigate the source and chemical makeup of the water discoloration reported across St. Croix. Sequential sampling is an investigative method that collects water samples representing water in contact with different sections of the plumbing system. By analyzing lead levels in each sample, scientists can pinpoint which parts of the system are contributing most to the contamination. From September 28–29, 2023, samples were collected from over 66 locations across the island and analyzed for microbiological content, metal concentrations, and overall water composition. The results confirmed elevated levels of iron, identified as the primary cause of the brown discoloration, as well as excessive levels of lead and copper in approximately half of the sampled sites, exceeding regulatory safety standards.

After reviewing the sequential sampling data, the EPA concluded that the primary source of lead contamination in WAPA's distribution system was the widespread use of brass plumbing components. Further testing of Richmond's storage tank revealed several concerning water quality indicators, including high pH, low alkalinity, elevated chloride levels, low sulfate levels, the absence of corrosion control treatment, and prolonged water stagnation. Due to the high cost of drinking water on St. Croix and the island's ongoing drought conditions, WAPA reduced the frequency of flushing its distribution system. Additionally, many residents rely primarily on household rainwater catchment systems and cisterns, using WAPA-supplied water only occasionally. As a result, WAPA water may remain stagnant in pipes for extended periods, sometimes several months, allowing greater leaking of lead from plumbing components into the drinking water. These problems are further exacerbated by the aging ductile iron water mains, which contribute to elevated iron levels in the system. Increased iron can interact with phosphate, which in turn reacts with lead contributing to the recorded deficiencies in phosphate and chlorine residuals observed throughout the distribution network.

== EPA Recommendations ==
=== Recommendations for the Public ===
To reduce the risk of lead and iron exposure in drinking water, the EPA has issued several recommendations for St. Croix residents to follow prior to the lifting of the "do not drink" advisory

==== 1.Clean faucet aerators ====
Faucet aerators are used to conserve water by mixing air into the flow and can trap particulate matter, including lead-bearing debris from corroded plumbing or disturbances in the water system. Cleaning aerator screens regularly helps prevent lead particles from entering your drinking water.

==== 2.Flush household pipes before use ====
Before consuming tap water, the EPA recommends flushing your home's plumbing by running water from the tap. This removes stagnant water that may have absorbed lead from household plumbing. As a general guideline, flush at least 250 mL of water if it has been stagnant for six hours or more. The exact amount of water needed depends on your service line's volume. To estimate this, measure the pipe length from the water main to your tap, multiply the length by the pipe's cross-sectional area to calculate volume, convert that to gallons or liters, and run the tap until that volume has been flushed

==== 3. Use certified water filters ====
Point-of-use or pitcher-style filters can effectively reduce lead exposure when used alone or alongside flushing. For best results, flush the tap before using a filter. Choose filters certified under:

- NSF/ANSI Standard 53 for lead removal
- NSF/ANSI Standard 42 for improving taste, odor, and appearance

==== 4. Install lead-free plumbing ====
Since lead may originate from plumbing components, replacing outdated pipes and fixtures is essential. As of 2011, the Safe Drinking Water Act (SDWA) defines “lead free” as a weighted average of no more than 0.25% lead in pipes and no more than 0.2% lead in solder and flux. When replacing components, use plumbing parts certified under NSF/ANSI/CAN 61 to ensure compliance with federal standards.

=== Institutional Recommendations for DPNR and WAPA ===
To address system-wide contamination and improve long-term water safety, the EPA has also recommended the following actions for the Virgin Islands Department of Planning and Natural Resources (DPNR) and WAPA:

==== 1. Public Outreach and Education Plan ====
Develop and implement a comprehensive education campaign to inform WAPA customers about the risks of lead in drinking water and how to reduce exposure. Topics should include flushing techniques, proper filter use, and ongoing health precautions. Outreach materials should include flyers, videos, infographics, television ads, and printed instructions, especially for households receiving water filters.

==== 2. Resume Routine Monitoring Under the Lead and Copper Rule (LCR) ====
Reinstate routine LCR compliance monitoring by collecting samples from at least 60 homes during two consecutive 6-month periods. Conduct a review of current LCR sampling sites and update the sampling pool as needed with DPNR oversight.

==== 3. Optimize Corrosion Control Treatment (CCT) ====
Conduct additional studies to evaluate current corrosion control practices. Adjust the treatment process as necessary and designate optimal water quality parameters. Effective CCT will help prevent lead from leaching into drinking water. Continued LCR sampling will also help measure the treatment's success.

==== 4. Develop a Low-Flow Flushing Program ====
Design a targeted flushing program to prevent water stagnation in areas with low usage, such as dead-end mains. The program should reduce water age, ensure even distribution of corrosion control treatment, and help maintain water quality. Update flushing procedures and distribution maps. Notify residents of scheduled flushing activities, as flushing stagnant water is key to reducing lead and iron levels.

==== 5. Inspect and Rehabilitate Storage Tanks ====
Perform internal inspections of all storage tanks. Rehabilitate tanks as needed to improve water pressure, remove accumulated sediment, and enhance flushing effectiveness.

== Government Response ==
=== U.S Government Response ===
To access federal assistance, a State of Emergency was declared in the U.S. Virgin Islands, allowing the EPA to conduct sequential sampling to assess the extent of water contamination. In response to reported elevated levels of lead, copper, and iron in St. Croix's water supply, President Joe Biden formally declared a federal state of emergency on November 18, 2023, following a request from the territorial governor Albert Bryan Jr. This declaration authorized the deployment of federal resources to support affected communities.

The Biden administration directed federal agencies to provide safe drinking water, water filters, and other essential aid. FEMA (the Federal Emergency Management Agency) was deployed to assess community needs and coordinate emergency response efforts. According to Jaclyn Rothenberg, FEMA's Director of Public Affairs, as quoted in a Time article, “To date, the Territory has provided more than 1,200 water vouchers to eligible residents in affected communities, which they can claim at several pre-established vendors on-island. Eligible residents should contact WAPA directly if they have not yet received a voucher.” FEMA also allocated $1.46 million in Public Assistance funding for emergency repairs to the St. Croix water system. Additionally, the Internal Revenue Service (IRS) recognized the severity of the crisis by granting tax relief to affected residents, extending filing deadlines and offering other disaster-related accommodations.

In May 2024, the EPA announced $12.7 million in federal funding for the U.S. Virgin Islands to identify and replace lead service lines. This funding is part of President Biden's infrastructure initiative to eliminate lead pipes nationwide, supported through the Bipartisan Infrastructure Law via the Drinking Water State Revolving Fund (DWSRF). Under the law, 49% of funds from the DWSRF's General Supplemental and Lead Service Line Replacement programs must be distributed as grants or forgivable loans to disadvantaged communities, marking a critical investment in historically underfunded areas.

=== U.S Virgin Island Territorial Government Actions ===
On October 30, 2023, Governor Albert Bryan Jr. declared a State of Emergency for St. Croix's water system after testing revealed elevated levels of lead and copper. He issued an Executive Order appointing the Commissioners of the Virgin Islands Department of Health (VIDOH) and the Department of Planning & Natural Resources (DPNR) as Co-Incident Commanders to lead the emergency response, in coordination with the Virgin Islands Territorial Emergency Management Agency (VITEMA) and the Virgin Islands Water and Power Authority (WAPA).

To prevent price gouging during the crisis, the Department of Licensing & Consumer Affairs (DLCA) implemented a price freeze on bottled water and related water products. The Environmental Protection Agency (EPA) also began working closely with DPNR and WAPA to assess contamination sites, conduct sampling and monitoring, and determine what repairs would be needed to restore safe water quality.

Among the emergency measures enacted by Governor Bryan were a cap on prices for bottled water and water truck services, activation of the Virgin Islands National Guard to support local agencies with operations exceeding their capacity, and full mobilization of VITEMA in St. Croix to coordinate a comprehensive emergency response.

To protect residents from potential lead exposure, the Virgin Islands Department of Health (VIDOH) launched several initiatives such as establishing dedicated hotline numbers for residents with questions about lead exposure or water safety; provided free lead screening clinics, including blood testing at the Frederiksted Health Center on St. Croix and the East End Medical Center on St. Thomas, targeting children and other vulnerable populations. WAPA's initial response included flushing the water lines in affected neighborhoods to remove sediment, rust, and localized contaminants. In the longer term, WAPA committed to working with the EPA and DPNR to investigate the root causes of both water discoloration and lead contamination.

After the results of the EPA's sequential sampling analysis were returned, Governor Bryan and the EPA jointly concluded that the water situation was sufficiently stabilized. The “do not consume” advisory was cautiously lifted in affected areas, with the condition that residents follow EPA and WAPA safety guidelines such as flushing taps and using certified filters before consuming water.

Throughout the crisis, the USVI government maintained consistent and transparent communication with the public. Governor Bryan held regular press briefings to share updates on test results and emergency response measures. Additionally, a Joint Information Center (JIC), comprising communications officers from multiple agencies, issued frequent press releases and fact sheets to address community concerns and dispel misinformation. The JIC provided vital updates including dates and locations for water shutoffs related to testing, progress on flushing and resampling efforts, Information on how and where residents could access blood or water testing, and educational materials based on CDC guidelines about lead exposure and its health effects.

== Lead Exposure: Vulnerable Populations and Health Outcomes ==
Increased exposure to lead and copper can have serious health consequences. The U.S. Environmental Protection Agency (EPA) has set the maximum contaminant level goal for lead in drinking water at zero, as lead is a toxic metal with no safe level of exposure. Lead is particularly harmful because it is persistent in the environment and can bioaccumulate in the human body over time.

Children, infants, and fetuses are especially vulnerable. Even low levels of lead exposure in children have been linked to damage to the central and peripheral nervous systems, developmental delays, learning disabilities, reduced stature, impaired hearing, and anemia due to disruption of blood cell function. In pregnant women, lead stored in the bones can be released along with calcium during pregnancy, crossing the placental barrier and exposing the fetus. This can result in reduced fetal growth and increased risk of premature birth. In adults, elevated lead exposure has been associated with high blood pressure, cardiovascular complications, decreased kidney function, and reproductive system issues.

In response to the water crisis, the Virgin Islands Department of Health (VIDOH) initiated a public health campaign, including free blood lead screenings for children under six and pregnant women. Of the 1,270 children initially screened, two tested positive for elevated blood lead levels. By late January 2024, three confirmed cases had emerged, and dozens of other children's finger-prick tests indicated the presence of lead, though not at levels consistent with lead poisoning. Fortunately, the data has not indicated a widespread lead poisoning outbreak among children. The same applies to adults, for whom no public cases of lead poisoning were reported. This may be partly due to the widespread use of cisterns and bottled water among adult residents. However, officials caution that the absence of confirmed cases does not guarantee safety, as lead exposure often causes no immediate symptoms. As such, individuals should not assume they are unaffected without proper testing.

To strengthen surveillance, the U.S. Centers for Disease Control and Prevention (CDC) assisted VIDOH in developing a monitoring program. Free screening was expanded to the St. Thomas–St. John district in early 2024 to establish a territory-wide health baseline. As of early 2024, no large-scale health effects have been confirmed in the St. Croix population. While the number of confirmed elevated blood lead cases remains relatively small, the St. Croix water crisis of 2023–2024 has heightened public awareness of the dangers of lead exposure. The long-term health implications remain a serious concern, especially due to lead's known potential to impair cognitive development in children and contribute to chronic illnesses in adults. The crisis has prompted a sustained public health response aimed at identifying and managing any emerging lead-related health conditions and ensuring the long-term safety of the U.S. Virgin Islands' water supply.

== Timeline ==
The following is a sequence of events related to St. Croix water crisis.

=== Pre-switch ===
- September 2005: Water haulers complain about the brown water coming from WAPA's Seven Seas desalination plant on St. John.
- October 2015: Senator Kurt Vialet called on DPNR to fine WAPA after residents found brown contaminated water flowing through their faucets.
- August 18, 2019: An Estate Diamond resident on St. Croix reported brown and reddish contaminated water from WAPA.

=== 2023 ===
October 16 - The Virgin Islands Water & Power Authority conducted water testing which resulted in high levels of lead and copper found in several of the samples.
