= Ellie (disambiguation) =

Ellie or Elly is a given name and nickname. It may also refer to:

== Arts and entertainment ==
- Ellie (film), a 1984 comedy
- "Ellie" (CSI), an episode of the American crime drama CSI
- "Ellie" (The West Wing), an episode of the American political drama The West Wing
- Ellie, a 2001 studio album by Ellie Campbell
- Ellie (The Last of Us), a character in the 2013 video game The Last of Us
- Ellie the Elephant, Mascot for the WNBA Basketball team the NY Liberty
- Ellie the Elephant, a fictional African elephant, originated in the Donkey Kong Country 3 video game

== Places ==
- 616 Elly, an asteroid

== People ==
- John Elly (1581–1639), a canon of Windsor
- Elly (dancer), stage name of Koya Rosado Elliott (born 1987), Japanese dancer, rapper, and member of Sandaime J Soul Brothers
- Elly (rapper), South Korean rapper, singer and songwriter Ahn Hyo-jin (born 1991)
- "Elly", a former stage name of Japanese pop singer Eriko Imai (born 1983)
- Elly, stage name of South Korean girl group Weki Meki member Jung Hae Rim (born 1998)

== Other uses ==
- List of storms named Ellie, a list of tropical cyclones
- "Ellie", the "Elephant" statuette given to National Magazine Awards winners

== See also ==
- Elie (disambiguation)
- Ely (disambiguation)
