= Maya Diab =

Lebanese singer (born 1978)

- مايا دياب
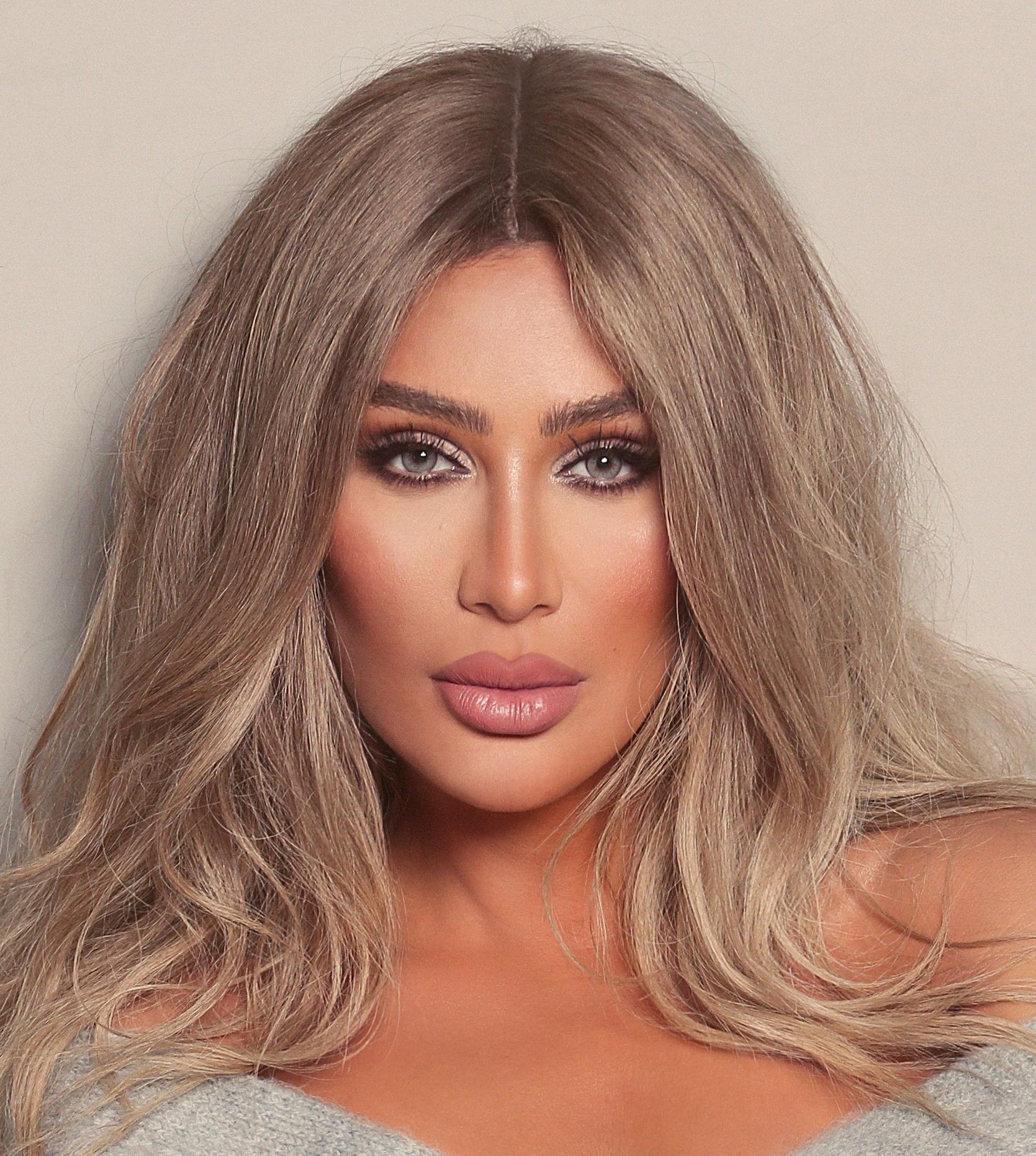
- Diab in 2020
- Born: Maya Henri Diab مايا هنري دياب; 12 November 1978 (age 48); Achrafieh, Beirut, Lebanon
- Education: Lebanese University
- Occupations: Singer; TV presenter; actress
- Years active: 2001–present
- Spouse: Abbas Nasser (m. 2006; div. 2017)
- Children: 1
- Musical career
- Genres: Arabic pop; world; dance
- Instrument: Vocals
- Label: MDM Production
- Formerly of: The 4 Cats

Maya Henri Diab (Arabic: مايا هنري دياب [ˈmaːja ˈdjaːb]; born 12 November 1978) is a Lebanese singer, entertainer, actress and television personality. She is a former member of the Lebanese girl group The 4 Cats.

== Early life ==
Maya Diab was born in the Achrafieh district of Beirut to a Greek Orthodox Christian family. She is the youngest of her parents' children and has one brother and two sisters. She majored in radio and TV media after receiving her university degree from the Lebanese University.

== Career ==
In 1996, she won the Gold Medal for the fashion category at Studio El Fan, when she was only 16 years old. In 1998, she participated in Miss Lebanon. In 2000, she competed in the TV presenting category at Studio El Fan, which led her to join The 4 Cats in 2001.

In 2007, she acted in Asad W Arbaa Kotat along with The 4 Cats and Hany Ramzy, then in two other TV series, Kalam Niswan in 2009 and El Donia Heik in 2010. In 2010, she left The 4 Cats. The following year, she released her debut solo single "Habibi", as well as a duet called "Sawa" with Ramy Ayach.

In 2011, she took on her first gig as a TV presenter with Heik Menghanni on MTV. She later presented Deal Or No Deal: El Ikhtiyar (ديل أور نو ديل: الإختيار) on Al-Nahar in 2012 and Ask The Arabs (اسأل العرب) on MBC 1 in 2016.

In October 2020, Maya Diab was named the Fashion Icon of the Arab World by the Arab Fashion Council, and she announced the opening of the 12th edition of the Arab Fashion Week, which was hosted virtually in Dubai.

== Personal life ==
She married a businessman, Abbas Nasser, in 2006, with whom she had her daughter, Kai. The couple separated in 2017.

=== Public statements ===
In 2016, Diab defended her decision to perform at a Beirut nightclub popular among LGBT audiences, criticizing those who judged her choice and stating that music transcends race, religion, and identity. In January 2020, she mentioned that she was kidnapped in Beirut in 2005, where she was held hostage and abused in a car for one day. In 2022, she reiterated her support for LGBT people, stating that homosexuality was not shameful, that individuals should be free to live their lives, and that society should embrace acceptance and respect.

During the COVID-19 pandemic, Diab questioned the safety and rapid development of COVID-19 vaccines on social media, describing people as "not a field of experiments" and urging them not to "put death and poison" into their bodies, drawing criticism for promoting vaccine misinformation. In January 2021, she also expressed concern over the pandemic's impact on Lebanon, describing the country as "dying" and highlighting hospital overcrowding and shortages of available beds.

== Discography ==
=== Studio albums ===
Title	Album details
#MyMaya	Released: 23 July 2015; Label: self-publishing; Formats: streaming, digital download
My Maya I	Released: 29 April 2023; Label: self-publishing; Formats: streaming, digital download
#MyMayaV	Released: 28 September 2023; Label: self-publishing; Formats: streaming, digital download

=== Live albums ===
Title	Album details
Maya Live	Released: 31 October 2015; Label: self-publishing; Formats: streaming, digital download

=== EP's ===
Title	Album details
My Maya II	Released: 29 April 2023; Label: self-publishing; Formats: streaming, digital download
My Maya III	Released: 29 April 2023; Label: self-publishing; Formats: streaming, digital download
My Maya IV	Released: 29 April 2023; Label: self-publishing; Formats: streaming, digital download

=== Singles ===
List of singles as lead artist, with selected chart positions, showing year released and album name
Title	Year	Peak chart positions	Album or EP
Title	Year	LBN	Album or EP
"Sawa" (with Ramy Ayach)	2011	—	Non-album singles
"Ibn El Youzbashi"	2011	—	Non-album singles
"Habibi"	2011	2	My Maya I
"Tawel Balak"	2012	—	My Maya I
"Chaklak Ma Btaaref"	2012	—	My Maya I
"Dabou Aynaik"	2013	2	My Maya I
"Gatifin"	2014	—	My Maya I
"Aywa"	2015	5	My Maya I
"Ya Niyali"	2015	9	My Maya I
"Ya Bayyaiin El Asssal"	2015	5	#MyMaya
"Fina Nghayir" (with Bahaa Sultan)	2016	—	Non-album singles
"El Donya" (with Bahaa Sultan)	2016	—	Non-album singles
"Keda Bardou"	2016	—	#MyMaya
"Biradini" (with K)	2017	—	Non-album single
"Tebead Aanni"	2017	13	My Maya II
"Baadou"	2018	3	My Maya II
"Ysouffou Haki"	2019	1	My Maya II
"Khserna Baad" (with Ziad Bourji)	2019	6	Non-album single
"Rob3i Sa3a"	2019	—	My Maya III
"Yaba Yaba"	2019	1	My Maya III
"Ana"	2020	18	My Maya III
"Naharna Wardi"	2020	—	My Maya III
"Doub"	2021	—	My Maya III
"High Heels"	2021	18	My Maya III
"Ahla Kalam"	2021	10	Non-album singles
"Watani Li Jayi"	2021	—	Non-album singles
"7ataly Rouge" (with Mahmoud Ellithy)	2021	—	Non-album singles
"Ahlan Wa Sahlan"	2021	1	My Maya IV
"Aktar Shewaya"	2021	3	Non-album singles
"Asmar Ya Helou / Bassak Teji Haretna / Mayil Ya Ghzayel"	2022	—	Non-album singles
"Layliyi"	2022	3	My Maya IV
"Emmi Ya Emmi"	2022	1	Non-album single
"Eiish Ahla Snin"	2022	4	My Maya IV
"Diali"	2022	2	My Maya IV
"Helw Dah"	2023	—	Non-album singles
"3arous (Bridal Song)"	2024	—	Non-album singles
"Albi Affaltou"	2025	13	Non-album singles
"Haramt Ahebak"	2025	—	Non-album singles
"Akher Sahra"	2025	—	Non-album singles
"Gabbah"	2026	—	Non-album singles
"Ghariba"	2026	14	Non-album singles
"—" denotes a recording that did not chart or was not released in that territory.

== Filmography ==
=== Film ===
Year	Title	Arabic Title	Role	Notes
2007	Asad W Arbaa Kotat	أسد واربع قطط	Herself	
2019	Lokhanda Elawbash	—	—	TV movie

=== TV Series ===
Year	Title	Arabic Title	Role	Notes
2009	Kalam Niswan	كلام نسوان	Batoul	
2010	El Donia Heik	الدنيا هيك	—	
2011	Heik Menghanni	هيك منغني	Herself	
2012	Deal or No Deal	ديل اور نو ديل	Herself	
