= Starring Julia =

2012 short film by Elie Fahed

- Poster
- Arabic: من بطولة جوليا
- Directed by: Elie Fahed
- Written by: Elie Fahed
- Produced by: Elie Fahed
- Starring: Elie Fahed; Julia el-Rami; Miled el-Rami
- Cinematography: Elias el-Khoury
- Edited by: Elie Fahed
- Music by: Eddie Towns
- Release date: 18 October 2012 (BIFF)
- Running time: 14 minutes
- Country: Lebanon
- Language: Arabic
- Budget: US$5,000 (estimated)

Starring Julia (Arabic: من بطولة جوليا, romanized: Min Boutoulet Julia) is a 2012 Lebanese short film written and directed by Elie Fahed. The short film premiered at the Beirut International Film Festival in 2012 where it got the Orbit Special Jury Prize, and traveled the world after it, taking part in the Baghdad International Film Festival, Menar Film Festivalin Bulgaria, Mizna's 8th Twin Cities Arab Film Festival, FICMEC 5th edition, Notre Dame University – Louaize International Film Festival, Outbox Film Festival, and won the "Best Student Short Film" award at the Monaco Charity Film Festival in 2013.

== Plot ==
The short film tells the story of Julia, a 70 year old woman, who lives in Beirut with her husband Milad, one day, while coming back home from the groceries shopping, she stumble upon a casting call ad on the street, which awakened her lifetime dream of being an actress.

== Cast ==
- Julia el-Rami as Julia
- Miled el-Rami as Milad
- Elie Fahed as Elie
- Joelle Yazbeck as Joelle

== Production ==
Elie Fahed wrote the script of Starring Julia during his bachelor degree years at the Lebanese University - Fine Arts Institute in Beirut, the script took around 9 months to be completed and another 3 months to find the right cast to play Julia.

The short film was completely financed by Fahed, and premiered at the Beirut International Film Festival. The film was Elie Fahed's directorial debut.

== Reception ==
=== Critical reception ===
The film toured to three countries, starting from its country of release Lebanon, then to Bulgaria, USA, Monaco and it was very well received by the press, as it took part of the “Must see short films at the Outbox Film Festival” list by Beirut.com.

=== Accolades ===
Award	Date of ceremony	Category	Recipient(s)	Result	Ref(s)
Beirut International Film Festival	2012 Beirut International Film Festival|4–12 October 2012	BRASS ALEPH: SPECIAL JURY PRIZE	Elie Fahed	Won	
Monaco Charity Film Festival	2013 Monaco Charity Film Festivall|9–12 May 2013	Student Film Award	Elie Fahed	Won	”
Outbox Film Festival	2013 Outbox International Short Film Festival|27–30 June 2013	Best Short Film	Elie Fahed	Nominated	
NDU Student Film Festival	2012 NDU Student Film Festival|18–25 November 2012	Best Short Film	Elie Fahed	Nominated	
Mizna's 8th Twin Cities Arab Film Festival	2013 Mizna's 8th Twin Cities Arab Film Festival|15–19 March 2013	Best Short Film	Elie Fahed	Nominated	”
