= Susman Brothers =

Business partnership

Susman Brothers was a business partnership that united brothers Elie Susman and Harry Susman after they crossed the Zambezi river in 1901. The brothers were Jewish businessmen from Rietavas, western part of Russian Empire, now Lithuania. They founded, owned, and operated several large businesses in Africa. Elie Susman, the younger of the two, was the founder of Susman Brothers. However, it was not until 1907 that the business name of "E. Susman" was changed to "Susman Brothers".

Retail stores in Northern Rhodesia (now Zambia) date to the Susman brothers. Their business empire lasted over a century by overcoming logistical difficulties, physically challenging obstacles, and political changes. They developed an extensive trading, transport and ranching network, which stretched from Botswana to the Democratic Republic of the Congo. Though they operated in many different places, their main focus was always the country now known as Zambia.

== Early years ==
Harry Susman worked as a peddler for a few years in Cape Town, South Africa, before crossing the Zambezi (at Kazungula) with Elia to buy cattle from King Lewanika of Barotseland in 1901.

== 1920s ==
The development of the Northern Rhodesian copperbelt began to take off, with the reorganization of the Bwana Mkubwa mine near Ndola in 1922. But Susman brothers pre-date to between 1916 and 1918. The brothers owned two concessions which covered part of what eventually became the Nkana Mine. The brothers' names still appear on the original title deeds. The Susman brothers eventually sold the claims for the Nkana prospect to William Lee, but retained the trading rights on the concessions. The brothers eventually become part of one of the richest copper mines in the world.

The Susman brothers heavily engaged, throughout the 1920s, in cattle buying along the line of rail. The Susmans supplied ivory bangles which were essential as trade goods. Their Leopards Hill Ranch near Lusaka Boma was used as a holding ranch, for cattle bought along the line of rail. Business was good for the Susman brothers; they asked the Northern Rhodesian government to enlarge the ranch. After complex negotiation with the government in 1927, the ranch was enlarged by 14,000 acres (57 km^{2}), in two blocks taken from the Soil people reserve. The ranch had 400 people living on it, including 150 labourers. Also in the 1920s, the Susman brothers had planted up to 200 acres of wheat, as well as maize, at the ranch.

During the 1920s, the Susman brothers bought and sold a number of other farms in Lusaka District. Next to their Leopards Hill Ranch, they grew tobacco on the Kabulonga farm, which was much closer to the rail line. But they sold the farm, after collapse of tobacco prices in 1928. Today, the Kabulonga farm has become the site for Lusaka’s most exclusive residential suburb. The Susman brothers also owned a section of a farm called Villa Elisabetta, farm number 110a. The brothers sold this farm to David Shapiro, for his block-and-tile-making business. They also took over Wolverton ranch on the Kafue river in Mazabuka; today Nakambala Sugar Estates is on this site.

In the 1920s, H. C. Werner dominated the copperbelt market with cattle working in the mine, and the beef market. “Wingy” Werner, as he was nicknamed because of his half arm, was a Dutchman from South Africa. He had also been involved in the cattle trading business since the early 1920s. He lived at his farm in Lusaka, which he called "Herefords". The Susmans' first major move onto the copperbelt was when they took over Bwana Mkubwa hotel and Ndola Butchery and Bakery, in September 1928. The brothers formed partnership with a friend from Southern Rhodesia, who also brought his own partners to the business. The most influential partner was Isidore Kollerberg, who was to play an important role on the copperbelt for the next forty years. The Kollerberg brothers, Latvian Jews, became the major shareholders in this partnership. The partnership built Nkana hotels and Nchanga hotels and set up bakeries and bottle stores in many Copperbelt towns. The Susman brothers were minority shareholders, but were very active in the management of this business. The Susman brothers also took a share in another business run by the Kollerbergs, the Copperfields Cold Storage Limited. This split the copperbelt meat business into two, with Copperfields and H.C. Werner.

The brothers were also joined by Maurice Gersh (1906–1992) and Harry Gersh, their nephews, sons of one of their two sisters, Dora Gersh. Gersh began working in Livingstone at their Pioneer Butchery & Bakery and set up his own store in the town in 1927. The Gersh brothers gained control of the Bwana Mkubwa Hotel and Ndola Butchery and Bakery in 1928.

== 1930s ==
In the early 1930s, the Susman ranch averaged 3,000 cattle. After Werner died in 1933, his wife carried on the business, while the Susman brothers reduced their stake in Copperfields, and in 1937 took a significant share in Werners.

The Susman brothers tried to ensure that at least one of them was always in Livingstone, to run their most important business interest, the Pioneer Butchery and Bakery, as for long periods, it was the only butchery in the town. The Susmans opened one more business in Livingstone in the early 1930s, when Elie Susman's family house, MARAMBA house, was rebuilt and turned into Windsor Hotel.

The Susman brothers became involved in one more copperbelt enterprise. This time in conjection with their nephews, Maurice and Harry Gersh, they set up in 1931 a company called Economy Stores Limited. It established stores which eventually became department stores called Economy Stores. Economy Stores was to serve as the base for an enormous proliferation of enterprises in the post-War years. When the recession of 1931-33 led to closure of mining operations, the Susman brothers sent Maurice, to "work in their businesses and to oversee the liquidation of some of their assets affected by the recession." Harry Gersh joined his brother on the copperbelt in 1930 and set up a store at Nchanga. He later moved to Nkana and set up another one there also. Elie Susman helped his nephews to start up and set up stores by identifying the sites to build them between 1935 and 1936. Maurice Gersh played a leading role in negotiations with the Northern Rhodesian government, with the set-up on a new town near Nkana, called Kitwe.

It was as the recovery from the Depression in Northern Rhodesia and South Africa was nearing its completion that the Susman brothers made their most momentous new investment. In December 1934, they agreed to take a share in a new business in South Africa called "Woolworth". Their partner was Max Sonnerberg; Max bought a departmental store in Cape town in 1929, changed its name to "Woolworth" in 1931 and started growing in Cape Town. There was no relationship with the F.W. Woolworth chain in the United Kingdom, but Max benefitted from the similar names. From 1930 onwards, Elie Susman began to spend half the year with his wife and family at the house in Beach Street, Cape Town, which he had built, calling this house "Barotse".

An agreement was concluded in December 1934 in which Susman Brothers invested $25,000 in Woolworth and took shares in the business. Susman Brothers invested over $50,000 in Woolworth in the next two years. They financed this large investment through an overdraft from their account at Standard Chartered. Elie Susman moved his family from Cape Town to Johannesburg and became a director in June 1935. Max Sonnenberg controlled Cape Town stores, and Elie Susman controlled Transvaal stores which included Johannesburg. Woolworth was formally launched as a public company in 1935. Elie Susman was 55 years old when he began to work on a more or less full-time basis for Woolworths.

== 1940s ==
Although Harry Susman was never involved in the management of Woolworth, he enjoyed Elie Susman's half-share of his Woolworth salary, until 1941, when Harry officially wrote to release his brother from this obligation.

In the 1940s, the brothers took on a partner, Harry Wulfsohn, to expand and redevelop their business interest in Northern Rhodesia. Their trading business began during the scramble for Africa and the heyday of Imperialism, coming through the colonial period to the ill-fated federation of Rhodesia and Nyasaland. The business went through the triumph of African nationalism and survived into the era of emerging market and liberatisation. In a meeting in February 1946, it was agreed that the company should apply to the government for permission to change its name from "Harry Wulfsohn Limited" to "Susman Brothers and Wulfsohn Limited". In complex negotiations with Harry Susman, Harry Wulfsohn set up this new company, with a fifty-fifty shareholding with the Susman brothers in the new company. Most of the negotiations also involved Elie Susman when he visited Livingstone.

Harry Susman remained the main representative of the Susman family business in Livingstone, until his retirement in 1945. A few months before the end of the Second World War, Harry Susman left Livingstone and settled on a farm, Umritsor, near Salisbury in Southern Rhodesia.

== 1950s ==
Harry Susman continued to visit Northern Rhodesia regularly until his death in January 1952. He lived long enough to celebrate the fiftieth anniversary of the brothers' first crossing of the Zambezi river, in April 1951, but sadly he did not live to witness the unveiling of the four-faced town clock that they donated to the Rhodes-Livingstone Museum, to commemorate that event.

Until his own death in January 1958, there was never any doubt that Elie Susman was, in spite of his absence in South Africa for most of the year, the senior partner and dominant personality in the business. He was the chairman of both main companies where Harry was a partner. Elie Susman was not prepared to take a secondary role in his businesses until the mid-1950s when his own son David Susman began to take over.

David Susman married Anne Laski, the niece of Lord Marks of Marks and Spencer. He eventually became a non-executive director of M&S, a position he held for nearly 30 years.
