= Elie =

Elie may refer to:

== People ==
- Elie (given name)
- Elie (surname)

== Places ==
- Elie, Fife, a village in Scotland, now part of the town of Elie and Earlsferry
- Elie, Manitoba, Canada
  - Elie, Manitoba tornado

== See also ==
- Elie Hall, Grenada
- Elie House, country house in Elie, Fife, Scotland
- Eli (disambiguation)
- Elia (disambiguation)
- Élie, the French equivalent of "Elias" or "Elijah"
- Ellie (disambiguation)
- Ely (surname)
