= Harry Wulfsohn =

Harry Wulfsohn (March 10, 1911 – August 11, 1969) was a partner in Susman Brothers & Wulfsohn. He was born on 10 March 1911 at Frauenburg, what was then the Russian Courland Governorate, now part of Latvia. In 1929, when he was eighteen years old, Harry's aunt invited him to travel to South Africa with his sister Marlie. Harry worked for some time in the bar of his aunt's hotel, but did not stay long in South Africa. By 1930, he had followed Marlie to Ndola, in the copper belt of Northern Rhodesia, where his sister married Abe Lowenithal, to whom she had been engaged before she left Latvia. However, Marlie died three years later. Her younger sister Hessie, who also followed her to Africa, become Abe's second wife in 1934.

Harry did not remain in Ndola, but soon moved south to Lusaka. He may have been encouraged to leave Ndola by the closure of the Bwana Mkubwa mine in February 1931, which had a devastating effect on the economy of the town. However, another attractive feature of the move to Lusaka was the government's decision to make it the new capital of Northern Rhodesia.

The Lusaka new town project was the only potential growth point in the country from 1931 to 1933. The project was being financed by the Beit trust, while development work on the copperbelt came to a halt. Only Nkana and the Luanshya mines had a little activity going on. The copperbelt economy was really in bad shape. On arrival in Lusaka, Wulfsohn got a job with a young Jewish man from Palestine named David Shapiro. In 1933, Shapiro won the contract to supply all the bricks and tiles for the new town project. Shapiro set up trading stores all around Lusaka and profited more than any other local trader from the development of the new capital. But before long, Harry lost his job, and this may have prompted him to set up in business on his own.

In the 1940s, he went into partnership with the Susman brothers, forming Susman Brothers & Wulfsohn. Harry was a full generation younger than his partners, but shared their Jewish roots in the Russian Empire. The firm of Susman Brothers & Wulfsohn has survived to present day.
