= Elie (surname) =

Elie or Élie is a surname. Notable people with the surname include:

- Antonio Élie (1893–1968), Canadian politician
- Freddy Elie (1946–2023), Venezuelan football player and manager
- Isaac Elie (1928–1999), Sudanese hurdler
- Jean-Marie Elie (born 1950), French football manager
- Jennifer Elie (born 1986), American tennis player
- Justin Elie (1883–1931), Haitian composer and pianist
- Lolis Elie (1930–2017), American lawyer
- Lolis Eric Elie (born 1963), American writer
- Mario Elie (born 1963), American basketball player and coach
- Mbonda Elie, Cameroonian politician
- Melissia Elie (born 1991), American-born Guyanese footballer
- Paul Elie (born 1965), American writer and editor
- Remi Elie (born 1995), Canadian ice hockey player
- Romain Élie (born 1985), French football defender
- Roberto Elie (born 1959), Venezuelan football player

== See also ==
- Elie (given name)
- Elie (disambiguation)
