= Elie Fahed =

Lebanese filmmaker and director

Elie Fahed (born May 8, 1989) is a Lebanese film director.

== Biography ==
Elie was born in Zaytoun (Lebanon) on May 8, 1989.

He studied film making at the Lebanese University – Fine Arts Institute. During his second year of studies, his personal short film “Ma Yenaad Aaleik” ("Happy Birthday" in English) was selected for the Beirut International Film Festival 2011.

“Starring Julia” ("Men Boutoulet Julia" in Arabic) is his bachelor's degree short film which tells the story of Julia, a 70-year-old lady who decides to pursue her lifetime dream of being an actress. “Starring Julia” has been shown at film festivals around the world including the Baghdad Film Festival, MENAR Film Festival The 5th edition of FICMEC Outbox Film Festival(Page 3) NDU Student Film Festival (Page 19) "Starring Julia" won the Orbit Prize at the Beirut International Film Festival 2012 and “Best Student Short Film” award in Monaco at the MCFF 2013.

In 2013, Fahed participated in Jamming With The Light, a cinematography workshop for directors and cinematographers conducted by Muriel AboulRouss, which resulted in a 28-minute short film entitled Impulse inspired by Dialogues by Jacques Salome. Fahed's contribution to Impulse was entitled Habibi, a black and white film describing the struggle of a married woman who can't decide whether to stay or leave her husband.

In 2015, Elie Fahed released on YouTube a two-minute film called "Things I Love".

In a recent interview with StepFeed, Elie explains the inspiration behind his latest project that it was rather simple: “I was driving and the yellow light turned red, it felt so good crossing at the very last second, so I decided to put this moment somewhere, the next morning I had a Man'ouche and I was like, ‘this very simple culinary invention can make your day better, and throughout the days I discovered that there’re so many cool and fun moments that we should share with the world, and I decided to film this.”

The film focuses on various aspects of Fahed's life: from London’s weather, to Fahed’s directors, the brief vignette into Fahed’s things brought back memories.

In 2017, according to Italian website Good Short Films "Life In 2 Minutes" was chosen as one of best 10 short films that are available online in 2017.

In April 2019, Elie Fahed was a jury member at the Beirut International Film Festival.

In September 2019, Elie released his 4th personal short film, entitled "The Fear Of Fear" which was screened at the GQ Portugal Men Of the Year in November 2019, in Lisbon, Portugal, "The Fear Of Fear" discusses the importance of fear in our lives, how it can take us places, yet it can keep us where we are as well, in a black white 3 minutes film.

In the year of 2021, Elie's fifth personal short film "Sett el Donia", got selected in Interfilm Short Film Festival in Berlin, in its 36th edition. This short film starring Carmen Bsaibes and Elie Fahed is a tribute to Beirut.

In the year of 2023, Elie's super8 film "Fait Main" won the prize of the best short film at the 23èmes rencontres cinéma et vidéo de Nice in France, this short film is a love letter to hands as described by Elie Fahed.

In 2023, Fahed directed and edited his Super 8 short film Fait Main, a personal film exploring the significance of hands and craftsmanship. The film won Best Short Film at the 23èmes Rencontres Cinéma et Vidéo de Nice in France. That same year, he directed several music videos, including Awal Kelmi, which won Best Music Video at the 2023 San Pedro International Film Festival in California.

In 2023, Fahed was also invited to participate in the Lebanese Cinema Through Your Lens initiative at the Lebanese International Film Festival, where he created Cinema Is Born Here, a three-minute film reflecting on Lebanese cinema and its relationship with the country.

In 2024, Fahed continued to work across music, fashion and film. He directed Woseltelha for Haifa Wehbe, released in January 2024, as well as Dancing Out of the Chrysalis, a fashion and dance film for designer Salim Azzam featuring the Mayyas. The latter was filmed in the mountains of Lebanon and brought together Lebanese fashion, dance and music talents.

In 2024, Fahed was also selected as a member of the jury for the Instituto Cervantes' short film competition in Beirut.

In 2025, Fahed served on the Shortlisting Jury for the Film Craft category at the Cannes Lions International Festival of Creativity. That same year, his campaign Recipe for Change received three Cannes Lions awards: Gold, Silver and Bronze.

Also in 2025, Fahed directed Hobbak Metel Beirut for Lebanese singer Elissa, for which he received the Best Music Video award at the Murex d'Or. His work during the year continued to explore themes of Lebanese identity, women, memory and human connection, while expanding his work across music videos, fashion films and commercial cinema.

In 2026, Fahed continued his work in music and commercial filmmaking. He directed Aayesh La Oyounak, a music video by Al Shami and Leen Hayek, released in June 2026. The film was produced by his Beirut-based production company, See You On Set Films.

By 2026, Fahed's body of work had expanded across personal cinema, fashion films, music videos and advertising, while maintaining a recurring focus on Lebanese identity, human stories, craftsmanship and emotionally driven visual storytelling. His work has been recognized through international film festivals and major advertising awards, including three Cannes Lions in 2025.
