= Elie Guillemer =

French cyclist

Personal information
- Born: 2 February 1904
- Died: 29 March 1987 (aged 83)

Cycling career
- Sport: Cycling
- Discipline: Road
- Role: Rider

Elie Guillemer (2 February 1904 – 29 March 1987) was a French racing cyclist. He rode in the 1928 Tour de France.
