= Livingstone Museum =

Museum

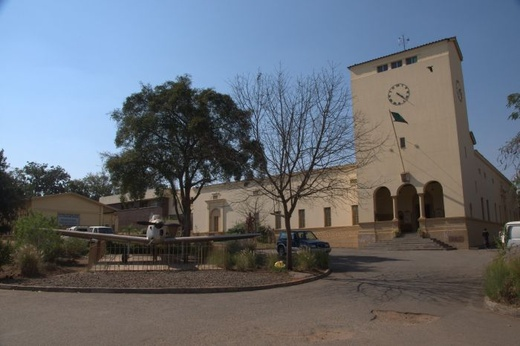
- Livingstone Museum, Zambia

- Location of Livingstone Museum in Zambia
- Established: 1934
- Location: Livingstone Zambia
- Coordinates: 17.8481°S 25.8553°E

The Livingstone Museum, formerly the David Livingstone Memorial Museum and after that, the Rhodes-Livingstone Museum, is the largest and the oldest museum in Zambia, located in Livingstone near Victoria Falls. The museum has exhibits of artifacts related to local history and prehistory, including photographs and musical instruments, and also holds possessions and memorabilia - including letters and journals - of David Livingstone, the explorer and missionary.

== History ==
The Livingstone Museum is the largest and the oldest museum in Zambia, established in 1934 as the David Livingstone Memorial Museum. In 1948, Captain A.W. Whittington offered to sell the two specimens of a fossilized human femur ("Rhodesian man") to the Rhodes-Livingstone Museum, but the museum could not afford to make the purchase. A new Spanish colonial-style building was launched in the year 1951. Jock Millar, former mayor of Livingstone, requested that Harry Susman donate a 'four-faced' tower clock to the museum, but before it was unveiled in the museum, Susman died.

In 1960 the museum recreated villages from five ethnic groups to give visitors a sense of traditional tribal life and to present the "way of life during the bronze and iron age." Following Independence in 1964, in 1966 the name of the museum was changed to The Livingstone Museum. In 2003 the buildings were renovated with funds from the European Union.

Over the years, the museum has been a trustee of numerous archaeological expeditions in Zambia. In 1956 the museum was a trustee, along with National Monuments Commission of Northern Rhodesia (a former name for Zambia) and the Wenner-Gren Foundation, of the excavation of the Kalambo Falls Prehistoric Site.

In 2005, a statue of David Livingstone was erected in front of the museum in memory like that of a statue of Emil Holub, a noted Czech doctor, explorer, cartographer, and ethnographer who made the first map of the Victoria Falls region.

== Geography ==
The Livingstone Museum is located in the heart of the Livingstone town on the Mosi-o-Tunya Road. It is 10 km away from the Victoria Falls, on the Zambian side. Road access is from three directions. The 11 kilometres (6.8 mi) drive from across the border near the town of Victoria Falls crosses over the famous Victoria Falls Bridge. The second approach is 60 kilometres (37 mi) from Botswana involving crossing the border at Kazungula by ferry. Livingstone is 470 kilometres (290 mi) from Lusaka, taking the southbound Kafue Road, crossing the Kafue River Bridge and taking a right turn towards Mazabuka.

== Layout ==
The museum provides an important insight into the national and cultural heritage of Zambia. An open archaeological site is located next to the museum next to the falls which has unearthed items from the early Stone Age to the present, covering some 250,000 years. Experts from the museum, such as Dr. J. Desmond Clark, once director, have provided an important contribution to research in the country. The museum has also provided expertise and support to archaeological expeditions in neighboring South Africa,

The museum is laid out in five galleries namely, the Archaeology gallery, the Ethnographic gallery, the History gallery, the Art gallery and Livingstone gallery. They cover topics such as archaeology, ethnography, history and natural history, mammalogy, ornithology, herpetology, entomology, botany and ichthyology.

The Archaeology gallery has exhibits of human evolution and cultural development in Zambia starting with Stone Age to Iron Age.

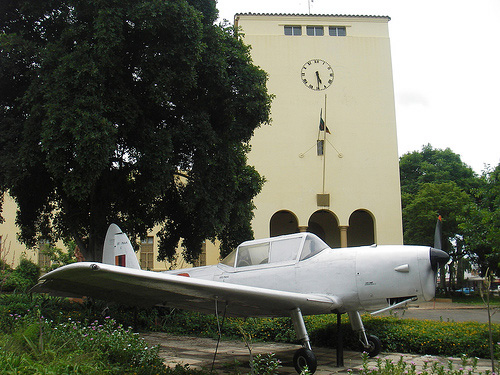
The front of the Livingstone Museum

The Ethnography and Art gallery has exhibits of the different cultures of the country. Handicrafts and musical instruments are part of this gallery.

The History gallery traces the origins of the Bantu people, the era of British colonial rule and the period until Zambia achieved independence from the colonial rule. Also on display are exhibits of endemic animals as seen in their natural habitats in Zambia.

The Livingstone gallery has an extensive collection of David Livingstone memorabilia, which were donated by the Livingstone family. The museum also has a large library of books on archaeology and wildlife and also some of the journals published by Livingston.

The museum often has special exhibits; the witchcraft exhibit was said to be "especially interesting, if somewhat hair-raising." It also features sculptures and paintings by Zambian artists.

== Publications ==
The museum started publishing "Occasional Papers" from 1948 but published the 16 papers in 1967 as a new series titled "Zambian Museum Papers", based on extensive research of Zambia's prehistory, history, ethnography and natural history. These papers were authored by specialists in each field. The papers provide substantial information on each of the large number of labelled exhibits systematically displayed in the museum.

- no.1 The material culture of the Fort Jameson, Ngoni.
- no.2 African dances of Northern Rhodesia.
- no.3 The material culture of the Lunda-Lovale peoples.-
- no.4 African music in Northern Rhodesia and some other places.
- no.5 Trade routes, trade and currency in East Africa.
- no.6 Life among the cattle-owning Plateau Tonga: The material culture of a Northern Rhodesia native tribe.
- no.7 The discovery of Africa: A history of the exploration of Africa as reflected in the maps in the collection of the Rhodes-Livingstone Museum.
- no.8 Some pioneer missions of Northern Rhodesia and Nyasaland.
- no.9 David Livingstone: A short portrait of the great missionary-explorer.
- no.10 Lunda rites and ceremonies.
- no.11 Some African poison plants and medicines of Northern Rhodesia.
- no.12 The fishing devices of central and southern Africa.
- no.13 Rubber: A footnote to Northern Rhodesian history.
- African dances of Northern Rhodesia by William Vernon Brelsford, 1959
