= Elie Buconyori =

Free Methodist bishop

Elie Buconyori, was the President of Hope Africa University, Free Methodist bishop in Burundi and President of the Free Methodist World Conference. In February 2011, Burundi President Pierre Nkurunziza awarded him Burundi's Presidential award for his entrepreneurial achievements with Hope Africa University, the country's fastest growing and largest private University. Buconyori was also elected to lead Burundi's Christian Church Forum which represents 80% of Burundi's 10.5 million population. In 2010 Buconyori was named one of the 5 most powerful people in Burundi, by Burundi's largest magazine Iwacu. Iwacu additionally revealed that Buconyori is President Pierre Nkurunziza's chief private advisor and best friend.

In 2011, the Interuniversity Council of East Africa elected him as chairman, the first time that Burundi leads East Africa's Education body. Buconyori received his PhD in Educational Studies with High Honors from Trinity International University in Chicago, Illinois, United States.

He is married to Joy Butoyi Buconyori, who was the former Coordinator of Child Care International in Nairobi, Kenya. Together they have four children.
