= Elie Aghnides =

Greek engineer and inventor

Elie Prodromou Aghnides (1901–1988) was a Greek engineer and inventor, best known for his invention of the faucet aerator. He was born in Istanbul, Ottoman Empire, in 1901. He had three siblings: Nicholas Aghnides, a former professor at Columbia University; Thanasis Aghnides, a Greek ambassador and undersecretary to the United Nations in London during World War II; and Esmeralda Aghnides. Aghnides was educated in England and received an engineering degree from the University of Belgium.

Aghnides' first invention was the faucet aerator, which is a standard part of nearly all faucets, in 1943. He said he got the idea from watching a waterfall. He also had a number of related patents throughout the years stemming from his original invention. He kept luxury apartments in both New York City and Paris.

Another of his inventions was the Rhino, an amphibious, 5-ton, 4-wheeled vehicle designed for multiple terrains. The prototype was built by Marmon-Harrington in Indianapolis. It was designed with a low center of gravity to prevent it from tipping over. He demonstrated the invention to the military, but they decided not to purchase the invention because they feared the inflatable wheels could be pierced by gunfire. Several photos and videos exist of the testing of the vehicle, and it was reported in 2015 to have been rescued by Eugene Pock when the factory moved to Kentucky in the 1960s, and Pock would bring the Rhino to annual threshing meets.

Aghnides married Margot Enright on July 19, 1952. After their wedding, the couple honeymooned in Europe, but the couple soon split after that, reportedly over a disagreement on whether to have children. After several years, their divorce was finalized.

Aghnides died in 1988 in New York City.
