= Elie Susman =

Russian businessman in Africa

Elie Susman (sometimes: Elia) (1880-1957) was the founder of Susman Brothers, an African business partnership. He was a director of approximately 50 companies and chairman of the Rhodesian Mercantile Holding Co.

== Personal life ==
Elie Susman was born to Jewish parents in Rietavas, western Russia, now Lithuania. He had an older brother Harry (b. 1876) who was his business partner. He also had two sisters, including Dora Gersh. With his brother Harry, Elie Susman, emigrated to South Africa in the late 1890s. From Francistown, they took a wagon loaded with trade goods and crossed the Zambezi at Kazungula where they traded.

== Career ==
He held the first mining license over what became the Rhokana mine. In 1930, he was one of the original directors who set up Northern Caterers Ltd., based in Kitwe, which operated hotels and bakeries in Luanshya, Nchanga, Nkana, and Mufulira.

In the same year, he left Northern Rhodesia and went to South Africa where, with a friend from Bechuanaland, Max Sonnenberg, they established the Woolworths stores in Transvaal; Susman served as the Resident director. He also was associated with Elie Susman Investments and Elie Susman Zambia Trust.
