= Elie N'Tamon =

Ivorian footballer (born 2006)

Personal information
- Full name: Elie N'Tamon Ahouonon
- Date of birth: 22 April 2004 (age 22)
- Place of birth: Abidjan, Ivory Coast
- Height: 1.88 m (6 ft 2 in)
- Position: Centre-back

Team information
- Current team: Reims
- Number: 28

Youth career
- Centre d’Apprentissage Foot
- 2022–2023: Torreense

Senior career*
Years	Team	Apps	(Gls)
2023–2025	Torreense	29	(3)
2025–	Reims	15	(0)

International career^{‡}
2019	Ivory Coast U16	3	(1)
- * Club domestic league appearances and goals as of 11 May 2026 ‡ National team caps and goals as of 19:13, 3 February 2025 (UTC)

Elie N'Tamon Ahouonon (born 22 April 2004) is an Ivorian professional footballer who plays as a centre-back for Ligue 2 club Reims.

== Career ==
N'Tamon joined the academy of the Portuguese club Torreense on 2 September 2022. On 4 February 2023, he signed a professional contract with Torreense until 2026 and was promoted to their senior team in Liga Portugal 2. He joined Reims in Ligue 2 on 27 August 2025 on a contract until 2030.

== International career ==
N'Tamon was called up to the Ivory Coast U17s for a local friendly in March 2021.
