= Reuleaux =

Reuleaux may refer to:

- Franz Reuleaux (1829–1905), German mechanical engineer and lecturer
- in geometry:
  - Reuleaux polygon, a curve of constant width
    - Reuleaux triangle, a Reuleaux polygon with three sides
    - Reuleaux heptagon, a Reuleaux polygon with seven sides that provides the shape of some currency coins
  - Reuleaux tetrahedron, the intersection of four spheres of equal radius centered at the vertices of a regular tetrahedron
