= Elie Track =

Elie K. Track is a physicist, technology executive and entrepreneur, whose work and research focuses on superconducting electronics, advanced computing, and photovoltaic technology. He served as president and chief executive officer of HYPRES from 1994 to 2000, returned as chief technology officer from 2022 to 2025, and is a co-founder and chief executive officer of nVizix. He became IEEE Fellow in 2014. He also served as president of the IEEE Council on Superconductivity from 2011 to 2014 and a founding co-chair of IEEE Rebooting Computing.

== Education ==
Track earned a bachelor’s degree in physics from the American University of Beirut in 1979. He earned master’s degree in physics in 1982 and a Ph.D. in physics in 1988 under Daniel Prober from Yale University.

His dissertation, Electron tunneling studies in tantalum overlayers on niobium and in tantalum and niobium nitride films, reported tunneling measurements on tantalum–niobium structures, fabrication and characterization of niobium-nitride films and tunnel junctions, and studies of electrical noise and localized states in oxide barriers.

== Career ==
=== HYPRES and superconducting electronics ===
Track joined HYPRES, a company developing superconducting electronics, in 1987. He held research, program-management, marketing, and engineering-management responsibilities before becoming president and chief executive officer in 1994. He served in that position until 2000 and subsequently remained with the company as a senior partner until 2013. His work included efforts to commercialize superconducting-electronics systems and the transfer of primary-voltage-standard designs from the National Institute of Standards and Technology to HYPRES.

Track rejoined HYPRES in January 2022 as chief technology officer. He retired from that position at the end of June 2025 and became science and technology advisor to the company’s management, staff, and board.

=== nVizix and Northrop Grumman ===
In 2013, Track co-founded nVizix LLC and became its chief executive officer. The company has pursued a high-efficiency vacuum photovoltaic technology intended to convert sunlight directly into electricity using an approach distinct from conventional silicon and thin-film photovoltaic cells.

From 2014 to 2020, he was a senior advisory engineer with ESG Government Solutions on assignment at Northrop Grumman in Baltimore.

=== Academic appointments ===
Track was a visiting professor of physics at Fairfield University from 2003 to 2005 and also taught at the University of North Carolina at Charlotte. In 2026, he started working as visiting assistant professor of physics at Fairfield.

== Professional service ==
Track held several leadership positions in the IEEE Council on Superconductivity, including president (2011–2014), treasurer (2015–2022), and vice president for finance (from 2025). He chaired the 2014 Applied Superconductivity Conference and the Coalition for the Commercial Applications of Superconductors (2008–2010). In 2012, he and Thomas M. Conte became founding co-chairs of IEEE Rebooting Computing, an initiative examining alternatives to conventional computing architectures.

== Research and scholarly works ==
Track's research covers experimental superconductivity, superconducting integrated circuits, radio-frequency systems, cryogenic computing, and emerging computer architectures. His work also addresses quantum engineering and computing technologies beyond conventional semiconductor scaling. He chaired the steering committee of IEEE Transactions on Quantum Engineering and co-authored the 2022 conference paper "Rebooting Quantum Computing" with Erik P. DeBenedictis.

== Selected publications ==
- Brock, D.K.; Track, E.K.; Rowell, J.M. (2000). "Superconductor ICs: the 100-GHz second generation". IEEE Spectrum. 37 (12): 40–46. doi:10.1109/6.887595. ISSN 0018-9235.
- Conte, Thomas M.; Track, Elie; DeBenedictis, Erik (2015). "Rebooting Computing: New Strategies for Technology Scaling". Computer. 48 (12): 10–13. doi:10.1109/MC.2015.363. ISSN 0018-9162.
- Track, Elie; Forbes, Nancy; Strawn, George (2017). "The End of Moore's Law". Computing in Science & Engineering. 19 (2): 4–6. doi:10.1109/MCSE.2017.25. ISSN 1521-9615.
- DeBenedictis, Erik P.; Track, Elie K. (2022). "Rebooting Quantum Computing". 2022 IEEE International Conference on Rebooting Computing (ICRC). IEEE: 78–83. doi:10.1109/icrc57508.2022.00010.

== Honors ==
- IEEE Fellow, 2014 “for leadership in superconducting electronics and its applications.”
- IEEE Council on Superconductivity Max Swerdlow Award, 2020 for sustained service and leadership in the applied-superconductivity community.
- YSEA Award for Meritorious Service to Yale University, 2020.
