= Alexandre Rouleau =

French-Canadian Ice hockey player

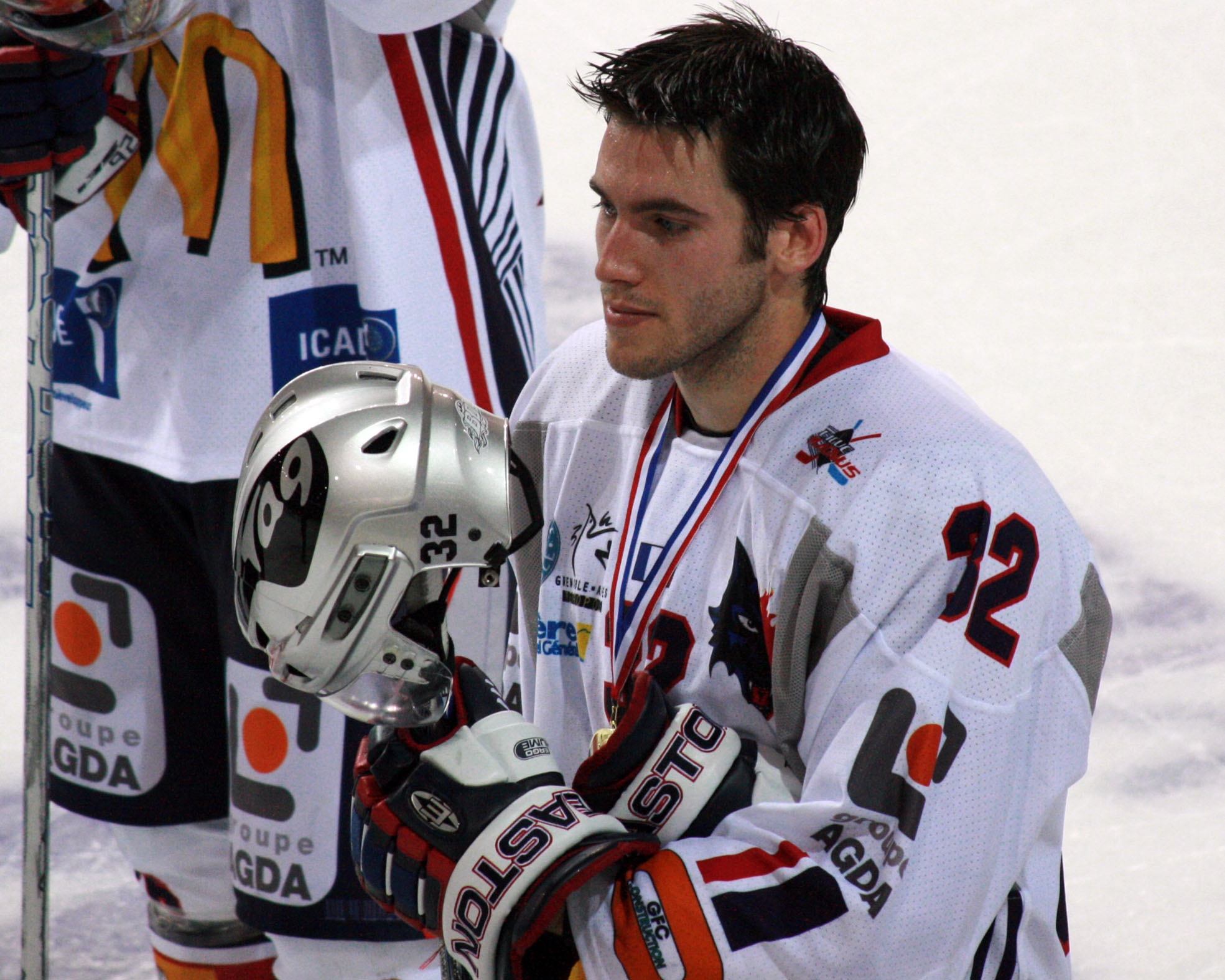
- Born: July 29, 1983 (age 42) Mont-Laurier, Quebec, Canada
- Height: 6 ft 1 in (185 cm)
- Weight: 198 lb (90 kg; 14 st 2 lb)
- Position: Defence
- Shot: Left
- Played for: WBS Penguins; San Antonio Rampage; Diables Rouges de Briançon; Brûleurs de Loups
- National team: France
- NHL draft: 96th overall, 2001; Pittsburgh Penguins
- Playing career: 2003–2012

Alexandre Rouleau (born July 29, 1983) is a Canadian former professional ice hockey player. Former General Manager of major junior team in which he played, the Val-d'Or Foreurs of the Quebec Major Junior Hockey League. He is currently amateur scout for the Chicago Blackhawks.

== Playing career ==
Rouleau was drafted by the Pittsburgh Penguins of the National Hockey League in the 2001 NHL entry draft. After spending four years between the ECHL and the AHL, Rouleau headed to Europe to play for Briançon of France's Ligue Magnus.

After a season with Briançon, Rouleau joined Brûleurs de Loups in 2008. Rouleau was named Alternate Captain for Brûleurs de Loups during the 2010–11 and 2011-12 seasons. Rouleau competed in the 2012 IIHF World Championship as a member of the France men's national ice hockey team.

After being in negotiations with Västerås and agreeing to a contract on April 17, 2012, Rouleau retired from professional hockey on August 10, 2012 to become a general manager of the Val-d'Or Foreurs of the QMJHL, the team that Rouleau played for from 2000 until 2003.

== Awards and accomplishments ==
- 2000–01: QMJHL Champion
- 2002–03: QMJHL Second All-Star Team
- 2002–03: U20 WJC Silver Medal
- 2008–09: French All-Star Team
- 2008–09: French Champion (Grenoble)
- 2008–09: French Cup Champion (Grenoble)
- 2008–09: French League Cup Champion (Grenoble)
- 2009–10: French All-Star Team
- 2009–10: French League Most Points by Defenseman (26)
- 2010–11: French League Cup Champion (Grenoble)

== Career statistics ==
=== Regular season and playoffs ===
			Regular season					Playoffs
Season	Team	League	GP	G	A	Pts	PIM	GP	G	A	Pts	PIM
1998–99	Amos Forestiers	QMAAA	41	7	6	13	144	—	—	—	—	—
1999–2000	Amos Forestiers	QMAAA	25	5	10	15	114	—	—	—	—	—
1999–2000	Val–d'Or Foreurs	QMJHL	41	3	3	6	39	—	—	—	—	—
2000–01	Val–d'Or Foreurs	QMJHL	70	8	17	25	124	21	1	0	1	46
2001–02	Val–d'Or Foreurs	QMJHL	69	14	25	39	174	7	0	2	2	16
2002–03	Val–d'Or Foreurs	QMJHL	31	7	12	19	92	—	—	—	—	—
2002–03	Québec Remparts	QMJHL	24	9	17	26	74	11	2	4	6	23
2003–04	Wilkes–Barre/Scranton Penguins	AHL	14	0	2	2	16	—	—	—	—	—
2003–04	Wheeling Nailers	ECHL	30	3	1	4	38	5	0	1	1	6
2004–05	Wheeling Nailers	ECHL	70	3	13	16	127	—	—	—	—	—
2004–05	Wilkes–Barre/Scranton Penguins	AHL	—	—	—	—	—	2	0	0	0	7
2005–06	Wheeling Nailers	ECHL	71	5	20	25	114	9	1	2	3	14
2006–07	San Antonio Rampage	AHL	25	1	0	1	27	—	—	—	—	—
2006–07	Phoenix Roadrunners	ECHL	41	9	24	33	65	4	1	1	2	10
2007–08	Diables Rouges de Briançon	FRA	26	9	16	25	89	9	4	4	8	10
2008–09	Brûleurs de Loups	FRA	26	10	11	21	89	11	6	4	10	14
2009–10	Brûleurs de Loups	FRA	25	8	18	26	46	9	6	1	7	12
2010–11	Brûleurs de Loups	FRA	25	7	10	17	98	2	1	0	1	22
2011–12	Brûleurs de Loups	FRA	25	7	9	16	72	20	9	12	21	49
AHL totals			39	1	2	3	43	2	0	0	0	7
ECHL totals			212	20	58	78	344	18	2	4	6	30
FRA totals			127	41	64	105	394	51	26	21	47	107

=== International ===
Year	Team	Event	GP	G	A	Pts	PIM
2003	Canada	WJC	6	0	1	1	0
2012	France	WC	7	1	1	2	6
Senior totals			7	1	1	2	6
