= Hany Ramzy (actor) =

Egyptian comedian

- هاني رمزي
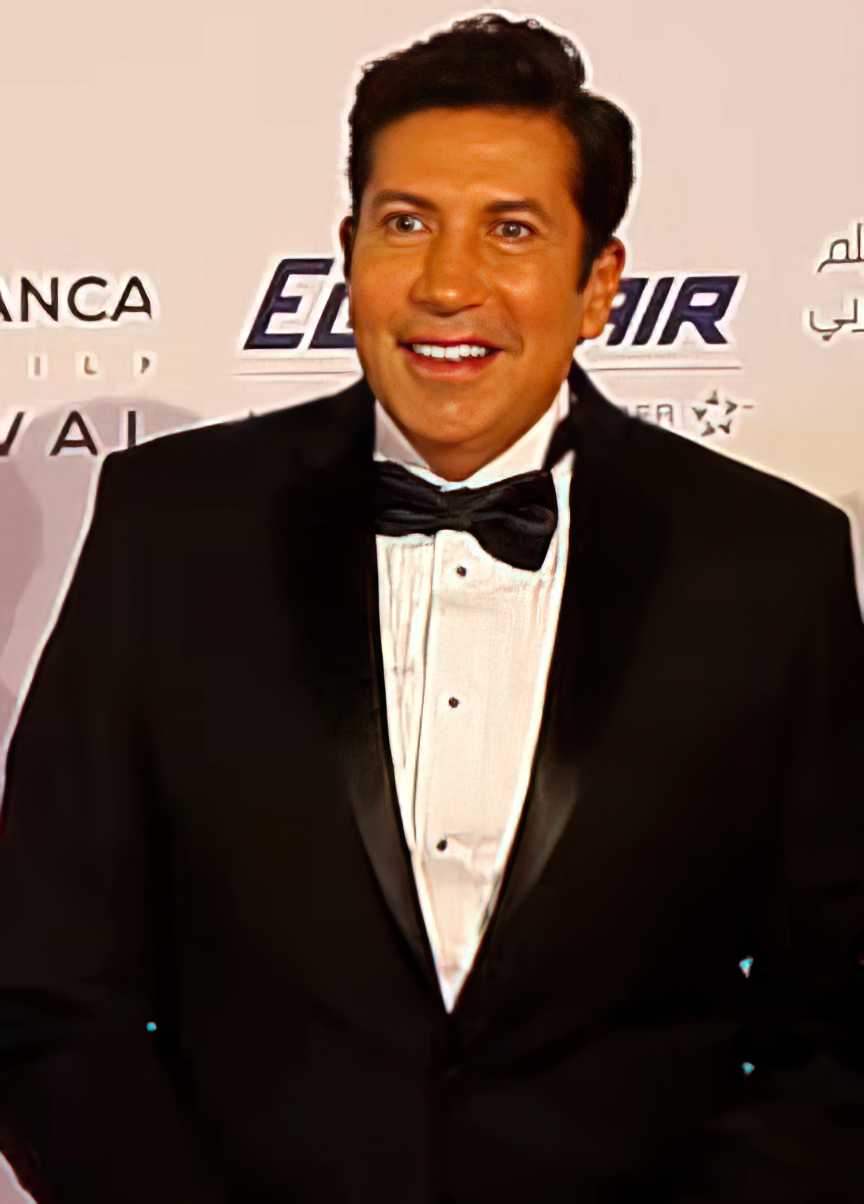
- Born: October 26, 1964 (age 61); Alexandria, Egypt
- Education: Cairo University
- Occupation: Actor
- Years active: 1986–present
- Notable work: Ghabi Minnu Fih, Nems Bond and Asad wa Arba Qutat

Hani Ramzi (Arabic: هاني رمزي [ˈhæːni ˈɾɑmzi]; born 26 October 1964) is an Egyptian actor and one of the most famous comedian actors in Egypt.

== Early life ==
Hani Ramzy was born in Alexandria and grew up in Beni Mazar, Minya Governorate. He later studied at the Faculty of Commerce at Cairo University before joining the Institute of Performing Arts. His debut was in the play Ana ayza millionaire written by playwright Yusri El-Ebyari, and he later collaborated with Mohamed Sobhi in the plays Takharif and Weghat Nazar. Ramzy has participated in a number of roles and starred in several films. Hany Adel Ramzy was born in the city of Minya, and his father is a lawyer. Ramzy is married to a woman from Asyut, Mona Mohab and they have two sons together, Shady and Jesse.

== Career ==
He started his acting career with Mohamed Sobhy in plays such as "Point of View" and "Nonsense". He also shined in the play "That's Ok" and tv shows "Twins" and "Ladies of Garden City.

Hani Ramzy became an important comedy star in Egypt and the Arab world due to having a long history of films that have achieved great success, such as Nems Bond, Asad wa arba qutat, Ghaby Meno Fih, Ayeez Haaky and Gawaz Bi-qara Gomhuri.

== Films ==
- Nasser 56 1995 (Naser 56)
- Se'idi Fi El Gam'ah El Amrikiyyah 1998. (Upper Egyptian In American University)
- Fer'et Banat W Bass 1999 (A band Of Girls Only )
- Wa La Fi El Neyyah Ab'a? 1999 (And No intention To Be?)
- El-Hobb El-Awwal 2000 (First Love)
- Etfarrag Ya Salam 2001 (Watch Wow)
- Gawaz Be Qarar Gomhori 2001 (Marriage By Presidential Decision)
- Se'idi Rayeh Jayy 2001 (Upper Egyptian To And Fro)
- Mohami Khol' 2002 (Attorney Of Divorce)
- Ayez Haqqi 2003(I Want My Share)
- Ghabi Mennoh Fih 2004 (Stupid From Him In Him)
- El-Sayyed Abu-El-Arabi Wasal 2005 (Mister Abu-El-Arabi Reached)
- Zaza 2006 (Zaza)
- Asad W Arba' Otat 2007 ( Lion And Four Cats)
- Nems Bond 2008 (Nems Bond)
- El Ragel El Ghamed Be Salamtoh 2010 (Mysterious Man By His Wow )
- Sami Oxid El-Carbon 2011 (Sami Oxide Of Carbon)
- Tom We Jemi 2013 (Tom And Jemi)
- Nom El Talat 2015 (Sleep Of Tuesday)

== Television ==
- Hawl Al Alam 1986 ( Around The World )
- Alef Lilah W Lilah 1986 (Thousand And One Nights)
- El Les Ellazi Ohebboh 1997(The Thief Whom I Love)
- Mabruk Galak Ala' 2006 (Congratulation You Got Worry)
- Esabet Mama W Papa 2009(Gang Of Mama And Papa)
- Aris Delivery 2011(Groom Delivery)
- Ebn El Nezam 2012 ( Son Of Regime)
- El Lela Di 2012-2013 (This Night)
- Nazaryet El Gawafa 2013 (Guava's Theory)
- El Aris Raqam 13 2014 (Groom Number 13)
- El Shohrah 2014 ( Fame)
- Hobot Idterari 2015 (Obligatory Landing)
- Hany Fi El Adghal 2016 (Hany In Jungle)

== Voice ==
In Arabic:

- Toy Story 1995
- Toy Story 2 1999
- Ramadona 2011

== Theater ==
- Koll Marra Ashofak Fiha (Every Time I See You)
- Takharif (Fables)
- Weghet Nazar (View Point)
- Keda Okkeh (Is This Ok)
- Alabanda (To The Band)
- Afrotto 1999 (Demon)
- Ana Ayza Millionaire (I Want A Millionaire)

== Shows ==
Hani started a prank show during Ramadan in 2015, where he invites Arab celebrities under the pretense of attending a meeting. He then takes them on a private jet, using stunts that the plane can safely execute to scare the celebrities, making them think they are going to die before safely landing. Upon landing, they are surrounded by actors who are in on the prank.

In 2016, Hani launched another show titled "هانى فى الادغال", Hani in the jungle, where he tricks Arab celebrities into jetting off to South Africa for what they believe will be a wonderful safari experience. However, the celebrities are frightened by jumping lions, snakes in a box and a driver being eaten. This show also aired during Ramadan.
