= Eric Rouleau =

Eric Rouleau (1 July 1926–25 February 2015) was a journalist, writer, and diplomat. He served as French ambassador to Tunisia from 1985 to 1986, and to Turkey from 1988 to 1991.

== Biography ==
He was born Elie Raffoul to a Jewish family in Cairo in 1926. Rouleau joined The Egyptian Gazette in 1943. His communist convictions led to his being harassed by the police and he went into exile in 1951. He joined the Agence France-Presse, and in 1955 Le Monde, for which he covered the Iranian Revolution. He also contributed pieces to Le Monde diplomatique. Egyptian President Gamal Abdel Nasser gave him an interview in 1963 in which he announced the gradual release of communist prisoners.

French President François Mitterrand charged him in 1984 with an informal diplomatic mission to Libyan President Muammar Gaddafi to negotiate the withdrawal of Libyan troops installed in Chad. The mission was successful, and he was appointed as French ambassador to Tunisia from 1985 to 1986. Just before the 1986 legislative elections, he was sent on a confidential mission to Tehran to negotiate – without success – the release of French hostages in Lebanon. Rouleau also served as French ambassador to Turkey from 1988 to 1991 and as a member of the sponsorship committee of the Russell Tribunal on Palestine.

He died in Uzès, France, on 25 February 2015.

== Works ==
- Salah Khalaf, "Palestinien sans patrie : entretiens avec Éric Rouleau", Paris, ed. Fayolle, coll. Voix arabes 1978. (ISBN 2-86221-034-X, instructions BNF No. FRBNF34618475)
- Eric Rouleau, Dans les coulisses du Proche-Orient: mémoires d'un journaliste diplomate, 1952–2012, Paris, ed. Fayard, 2012. (ISBN 978-2-213-67143-7, notice BNF No. FRBNF42782400)
