= Alfred Rouleau =

Canadian businessman (1915–1985)

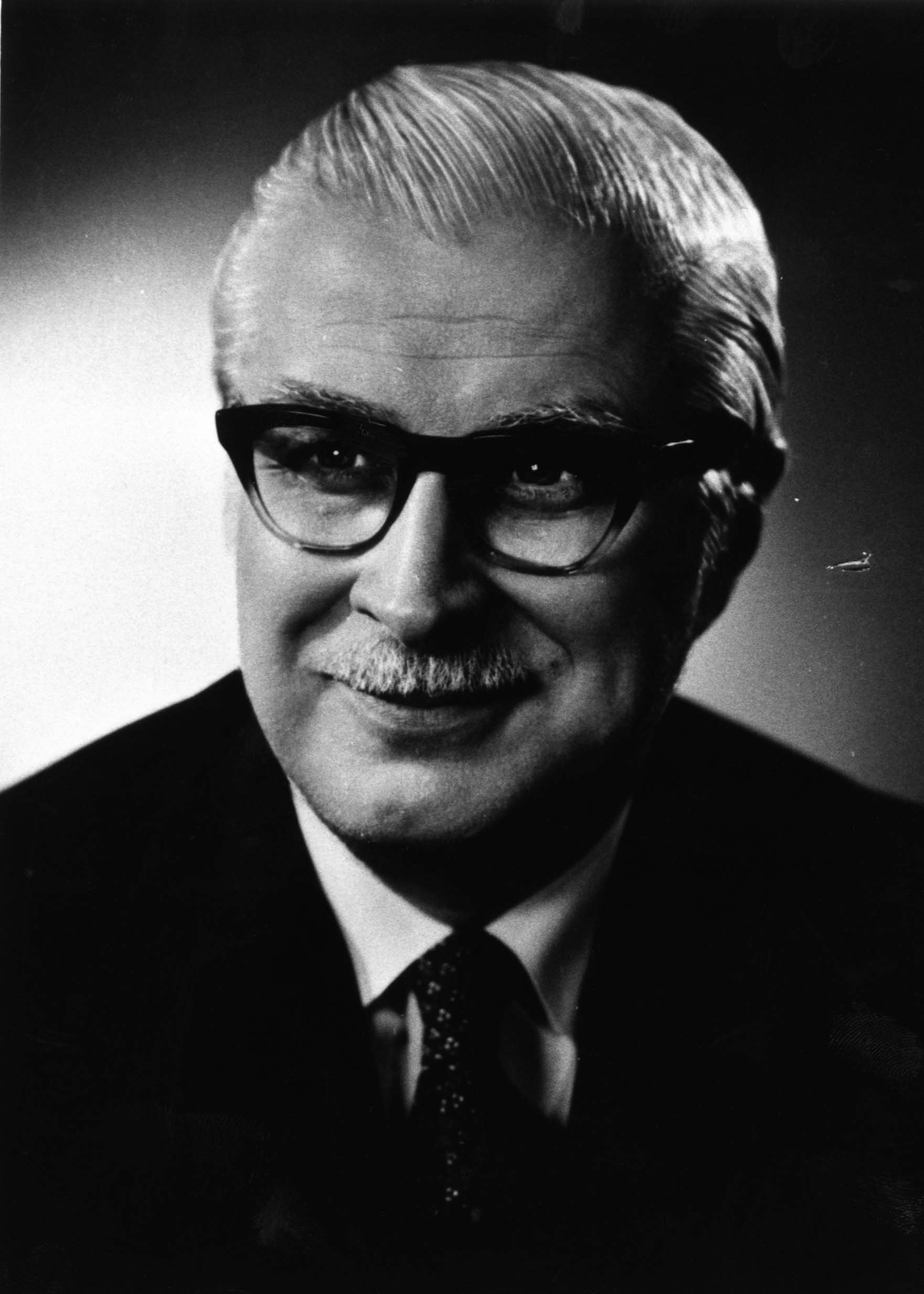
- Born: August 19, 1915; Sherbrooke, Quebec
- Died: October 19, 1985 (aged 70); Montreal, Quebec
- Awards: Order of Canada; National Order of Quebec

Alfred Rouleau, CC GOQ (August 19, 1915 – October 19, 1985) was a Canadian businessman and President of the Fédération du Québec des Caisses Populaires Desjardins, Quebec's largest credit union.

Born in Sherbrooke, Quebec, he was elected President of Desjardins in 1972 and served until 1981.

== Honours ==
- In 1973 he was made a Companion of the Order of Canada.
- In 1985 he was made a Grand Officer of the National Order of Quebec.
