= Faucet aerator =

Water conservation device

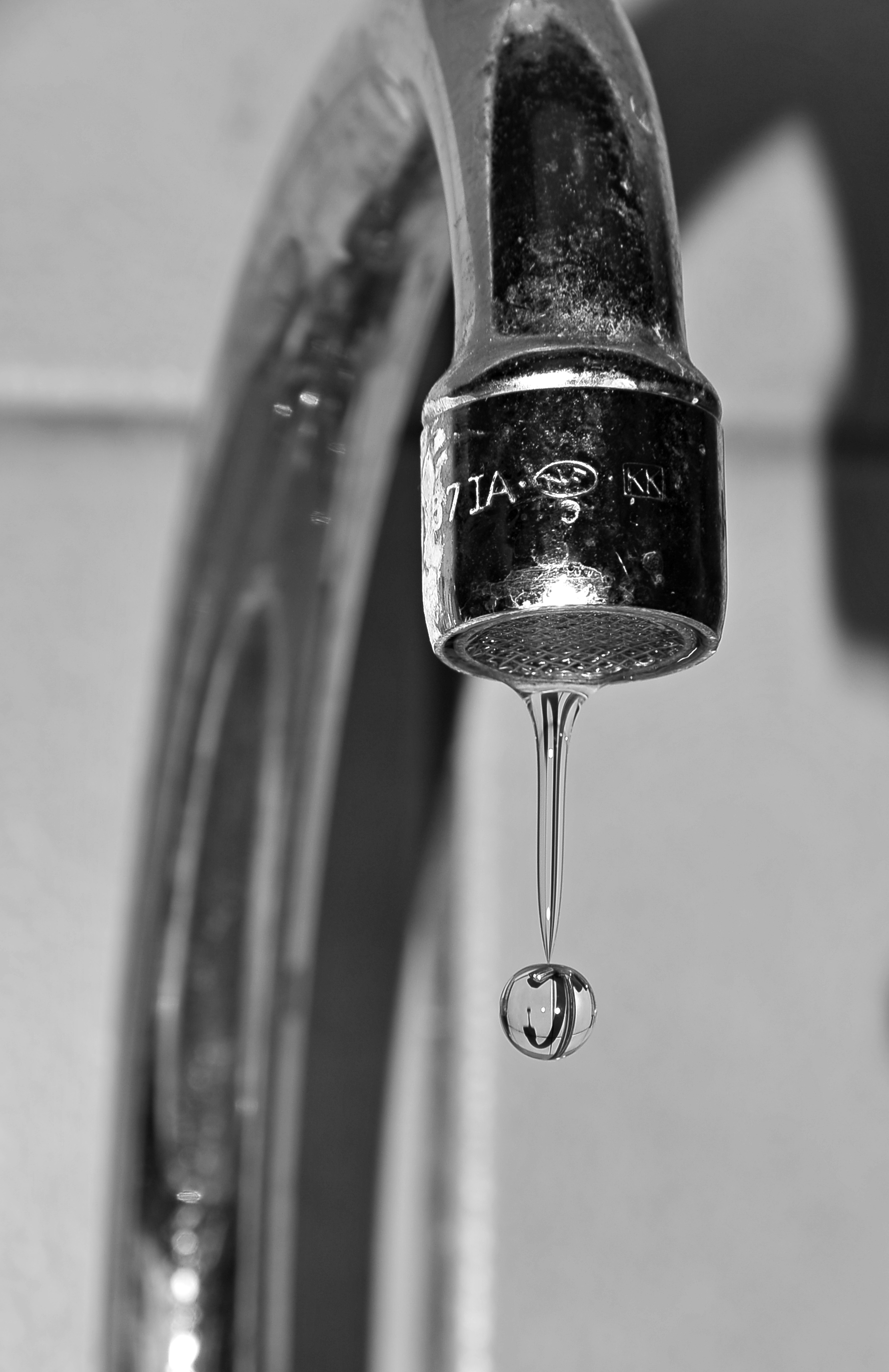
An aerator attached to a sink tap

A faucet aerator (or tap aerator) is often found at the tip of modern indoor water faucets. Aerators can simply be screwed onto the faucet head, creating a non-splashing stream and often delivering a mixture of water and air.

== History ==
The aerator was invented by Greek engineer Elie Aghnides.

== Function ==
An aerator can:

- Prevent splashing
- Shape the water stream coming out of the faucet spout, to produce a straight and evenly pressured stream
- Conserve water and reduce energy costs
- Reduce faucet noise
- Increase perceived water pressure (often used in homes with low water pressure); sometimes described as a pressure regulator or flow regulator
- Provide slight filtration of debris due to a small sieve plate

=== Splash prevention ===
When a single stream of water hits a surface the water must go somewhere, and because the stream is uniform the water will tend to go mostly in the same direction. If a single stream hits a surface which is curved, then the stream will conform to the shape and be easily redirected with the force of the volume of water falling. Adding the aerator does two things: it reduces the volume of falling water which reduces the splash distance, and it creates multiple "mini-streams" within the main stream. Each mini-stream, if it were falling by itself, would splash or flow in a unique and different way when it hit the surface, as compared to the other mini-streams. Because they are all falling at the same time, the streams will splash in their own way but end up hitting other splash streams. The resulting interference cancels out the majority of the splashing effect.

=== Conservation and energy reduction ===
Because the aerator limits the water flow through the faucet, water usage is reduced compared to the same duration of flow without an aerator. In the case of hot water, because less water is used, less heat energy is used.

=== Perceived water pressure ===
The perception of water pressure is actually the speed of the water as it hits a surface (the hands, in the case of hand washing). When an aerator is added to the faucet (or fluid stream), there is a region of high pressure created behind the aerator. Because of the higher pressure behind the aerator and the low pressure in front of it (outside the faucet), due to Bernoulli's principle there is an increase in velocity of the fluid flow.

== Process ==
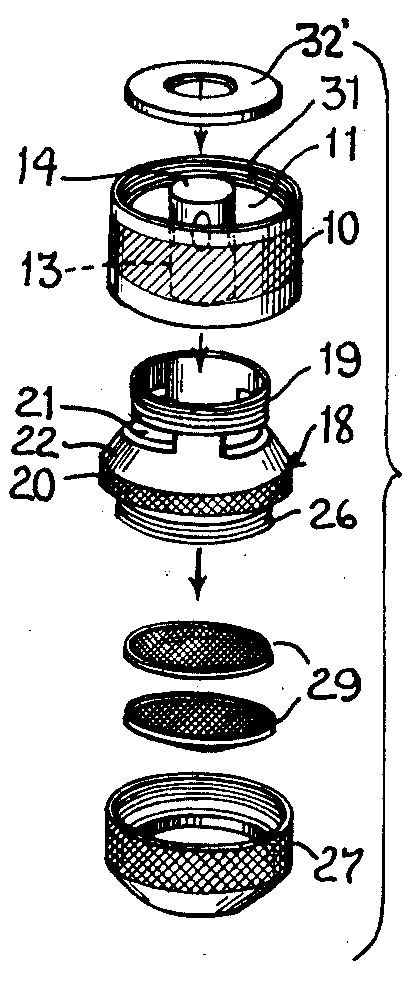
Aerator assembly diagram

Aeration occurs in two basic steps:

1. Air is drawn into the water stream, breaking the stream into a flow of tiny droplets mixed with air.
2. The mixture of air and water passes through a screen, further mixing the air and water and evenly spreading out the resulting stream.

== Design and features ==
Three major components of an aerator are: housing, insert and rubber washer.

A faucet aerator can be classified on the basis of its flow rate and the type of water stream (aerated, non-aerated, spray) it produces. In general, standard-sized aerators are available with female (M22x1) or male threading (M24x1). Bathtub spouts often have a bigger diameter with a male M28x1 thread. The United States uses different thread sizes: 15/16"-27 for standard-sized male and 55/64"-27 for standard-sized female threads.

Using faucet aerators may help meet local regulations and construction standards such as ASME A112.18.1, U.S. Leadership in Energy and Environmental Design (LEED) certifications or WELS (Australia/New Zealand). In Europe, European standard EN246 "Sanitary tapware — General specifications for flow rate regulators" defines the flow rate and noise reduction requirements.
