= Elie Nakouzi =

Lebanese-American television broadcaster

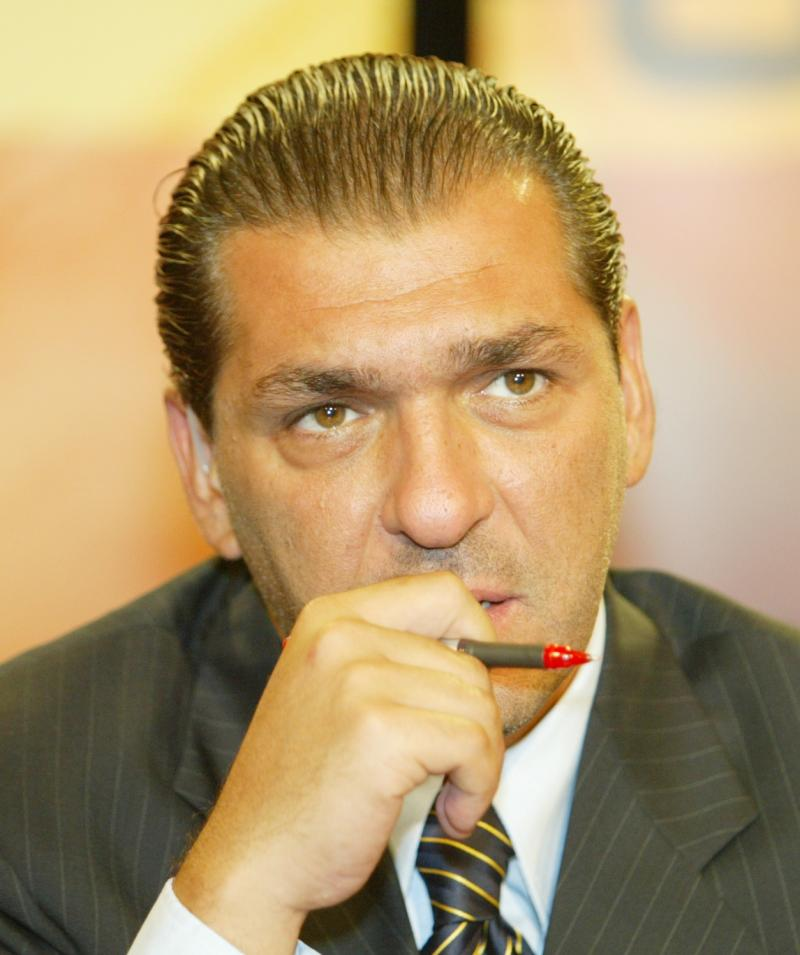
- Born: July 14, 1969 (age 56); Beirut, Lebanon
- Occupation(s): Television broadcaster, presenter

Elie Nakouzi (born July 14, 1969) is a Lebanese-American television broadcaster and presenter with over 35 years of experience in international affairs and Middle East broadcasting. He has interviewed U.S. President George W. Bush, UK Prime Ministers Tony Blair and Gordon Brown, Israeli Foreign Minister Tzipi Livni, Pakistani General Pervez Musharraf, Iranian President Mahmoud Ahmedinejad, Sudanese President Omar Al-Bashir, General David Petraeus, among many other World Leaders.

== Early life and education ==
Nakouzi is a Lebanese-American journalist and Executive producer. He was born in Beirut, Lebanon, to Christian Lebanese parents before immigrating to the USA with his family in 2010. He enrolled in medical school, changed his concentration to computer science, before deciding on international relations. He also taught Political Science and International Affairs at the Lebanese-American University (LAU). In 2010, Nakouzi immigrated to the USA and launched his Production house, Make Sense Productions, and won more than 16 awards for various projects.

== Career ==
Nakouzi began his career as a presenter on Parliament of the Youth, a program hosted by Radio Voice of Lebanon, in 1990. In 1993, he became anchor of a reproduction of Parliament of the Youth, made for ICN Network. Although ICN network was shut down in 1994, Nakouzi soon began work as a senior anchor with the LBC (Lebanese Broadcasting Corporation) in 1994 which allowed him to continue to address issues directly related to the Syrian invasion of Lebanon.

In 1997, Nakouzi became the senior anchor at MurrTV's Take a Stand program. At its core, Take a Stand addressed reforming the loss of civic values that resulted from the Syrian occupation of Lebanon, including promoting democratic values and ending human rights abuses. From 1998, a year after Nakouzi began, until 2002, when he left, Take a Stand became the top rated political commentary show in Lebanon. Eventually, as with Parliament of the Youth, Nakouzi and Take a Stand ran afoul of Syrian officials, and MurrTV was forcibly shut down in 2002.

Following the closure of MurrTV, Nakouzi accepted a position with Al-Arabiya TV as an anchor for the From Iraq program in 2003. The Dubai-based Al-Arabiya TV was established on March 23, 2003 as a direct competitor to the Al-Jazeera network. Launched during the Iraq War of 2003, From Iraq focused on security issues as well as political and social realities in Iraq at the time. With a weekly interview of influential political players in Iraq, From Iraq focused on the former Iraqi regime's human rights abuses, the U.S.-led invasion of Iraq, and the country's future. From Iraq ran from 2003 to 2006.

From 2007 to 2009, Nakouzi hosted Besaraha, which in Arabic translates to "Frankly Speaking". Besaraha consistently secured interviews with many prominent world leaders and provided in depth conversation from viewpoints not widely expressed in mainstream Middle Eastern media. Besaraha was positively received within the Middle East and holds the record for most heads of state interviewed in one year by any Arabic news outlet. The show was watched by more than 30 million viewers weekly.

Following death threats for his involvement in Lebanon's 2009 Parliamentary elections, Nakouzi emigrated from Lebanon to the United States and started his own production house, Make Sense Productions. In 2013, Nakouzi cofounded The Dialogue Chronicle, a politics and humor blog staffed entirely by activist writers.

== Journalistic achievements ==
In 2007, Nakouzi became the first Arab news anchor to interview U.S. President George W. Bush. The interview lasted for 60 minutes and was conducted at various locations throughout the White House: beginning in the Oval Office, continuing through the Rose Garden, and concluding in the Map Room. During the interview, Nakouzi and Bush discussed the current state of affairs in the Middle East and Bush's hope for the future of the region. Set amidst the backdrop of the Iraq War and the Afghanistan War, this interview allowed audiences within the Middle East to understand the positions of the United States in contrast with the opinions usually presented in mainstream Middle Eastern media.

Other interviews of note include:

- Robert Gates, former U.S. Secretary of Defense
- Tony Blair, former Prime Minister of the United Kingdom
- Gordon Brown, former Prime Minister of the United Kingdom
- Tzipi Livni, former Foreign Minister of Israel
- General Pervez Musharraf, former President of Pakistan
- Mahmoud Ahmedinejad, former President of Iran
- Omar Al-Bashir, President of Sudan
- John Bolton, former US Ambassador to the United Nations
- Ambassador Paul Bremer, former U.S. Civil Administrator of Iraq
- General Raymond Odierno, Commanding General of the Multi-National Corps-Iraq
- General George Casey, Commander of the Multi-National Forces, Iraq (MNFI)
- General Ricardo Sanchez, former Commander of MNFI
- General Mark Kimmitt, MNFI military spokesperson
- Dan Senor, Civil Spokesperson for the Coalition Provisional Authority (CPA) in Iraq
- Nabil Khoury, Arabic media spokesperson for the CPA in Iraq
- Dr. Ayad Allawi, former Prime Minister of Iraq
- Dr. Nouri Al-Maliki, former Prime Minister of Iraq
- Masoud Barzani, current Governor of the Region of Kurdistan
- Jalal Talabani, current President of Iraq
- Dr. Barham Salih, former Deputy Prime Minister of Iraq
- Abdul Aziz Al-Hakim, former head of the Iraqi SCIRI political party
- Dr. Ahmed Chalabi, head of the INC political party
- Dr. Ibrahim Jaafari, former Prime Minister of Iraq
- Dr. Tariq al-Hashimi, former Vice President of Iraq
- Nechervan Barzani, current Prime Minister of the Region of Kurdistan

== Political achievements ==
As a senior political anchor and activist, Nakouzi has participated in the electoral process of several countries within the Middle East. In 2009, Nakouzi presented a program on Al-Arabiya TV dedicated to covering the Lebanese Parliamentary elections. The program soon expanded to become the focal point for information concerning the elections. Nakouzi's program provided daily updates on campaign and candidate information in an easily accessible manner for all Lebanese voters.

Many observers leading up to the 2009 Lebanese Parliamentary elections predicted sweeping wins by Hezbollah and Hezbollah-affiliated candidates. However, such a Hezbollah victory did not occur in 2009. Many credit a combination of media and advertising campaigns, to which Nakouzi contributed, as the decisive factor allowing the March 14 Alliance to capture 71 of the 128 seats in the Lebanese Parliament.

However such political involvement on the side of the secular March 14th Alliance produced a backlash among Islamist organizations in Lebanon. In the wake of the 2009 parliamentary elections, political violence and a string of assassinations broke out in Beirut. Nakouzi and his colleagues that had been involved with the elections soon found themselves targeted by Hezbollah in Lebanon. Concerned for his personal safety and that of his family, Nakouzi immigrated to the United States in 2010.

The events of 2009 were not the first time Nakouzi's work had put his life in danger. While with Al-Arabiya TV, Nakouzi introduced a debate-style concept between electoral candidates of the newly reconstituted government of Iraq. His political work in Iraq soon saw him declared an infidel by Al-Qaeda. As a result, the Al-Arabiya Bureau in Baghdad was bombed, killing dozens of his colleagues. He was officially declared the target of this attack.
