= Ely =

Ely or ELY may refer to:

== Places ==
=== England ===
- Ely, Cambridgeshire, a cathedral city in Cambridgeshire, England
  - Ely Rural District, a former district surrounding Ely, Cambridgeshire on the west and north
  - Ely Urban District, a former district containing Ely and some surrounding areas
  - Isle of Ely, a historic region and former county around the city of Ely
  - Diocese of Ely, a Church of England diocese in the Province of Canterbury
- Ely Place, a road in London

=== Ireland ===
- Éile, a medieval kingdom commonly anglicised Ely
- Ely Place, Dublin, a street

=== Wales ===
- Ely, Cardiff, a suburb of west Cardiff, Wales
  - Ely (Cardiff electoral ward)
- River Ely, a river in Wales that flows through Cardiff

=== United States ===
- Ely, Iowa, a city
- Ely, Minnesota, a city
- Ely, Missouri, an unincorporated community
- Ely, Nevada, a city and county seat
- Ely, New Jersey, an unincorporated community
- Ely, Virginia, an unincorporated community
- Ely Township, Michigan
- Ely, a village belonging to Fairlee, Vermont
- Ely Range, a mountain range in Nevada

== Codes ==
- El Al, Israeli airline (ICAO code: ELY)
- Ely Airport, also known as Yelland Field, IATA code ELY
- Ely railway station, an English railway station that has National Rail code ELY
- Elyria (Amtrak station), an Ohio rail station, which has Amtrak station code ELY
- Callaway Golf, a company that has New York Stock Exchange code ELY

== In education ==
- Ely Professor of Divinity, a professorship at the University of Cambridge
- Ely College, Ely, Cambridgeshire, United Kingdom
- King's Ely, Ely, Cambridgeshire, United Kingdom
- Ely Theological College, Ely, Cambridgeshire
- Ely High School for Girls, Ely, Cambridgeshire
- Ely Hall, Vassar College, Poughkeepsie, New York, United States
- Ely Memorial High School, Ely, Minnesota, United States

== People ==
- Ely (surname), a list of people
- Ely (given name), a list of people
- Ely (footballer) (1921–1991), Brazilian football defender

== Other uses ==
- USS Ely, the name of more than one United States Navy ship
- Marquess of Ely, an extant title in the Peerage of Ireland
- Earl of Ely, three extinct titles in the Peerage of Ireland
- Ely House (disambiguation)
- Ely Racecourse, a racecourse in Cardiff, Wales
- ELY Centre, a government agency of Finland

== See also ==
- Liber Eliensis (sometimes titled Book of Ely), a 12th-century English chronicle and history
- Eli (disambiguation)
- Elie
- Eley (disambiguation)
- Ili (disambiguation)
