= Eli =

Eli most commonly refers to:

- Eli (name), a given name, nickname and surname
- Eli (biblical figure)

Eli or ELI may also refer to:

== Film ==
- Eli (2015 film), a Tamil film
- Eli (2019 film), an American horror film

== People ==
- Eli (musician), an American singer-songwriter

== Music ==
=== Albums ===
- Eli (Jan Akkerman & Kaz Lux album), released 1976
- Eli (Supernaut album), released 2006

== Places ==
- Alni, Ardabil Province, Iran, also known as Elī
- Eli, Mateh Binyamin, an Israeli settlement in the West Bank
- Éile or Éli, a medieval kingdom in Ireland
- Eli, Kentucky, United States
- Eli, Nebraska, United States
- Eli, West Virginia, United States

== Other uses ==
- Eli (opera), an opera by Walter Steffens
- ELI (programming language)
- Earth Learning Idea
- English language institute
- Environmental Law Institute, an American environmental law policy organization
- European Law Institute
- European Legislation Identifier
- Extra Low Interstitial
- Extreme Light Infrastructure, a high energy laser research facility of the European Union
- Eli, someone from Yale University, after Elihu Yale
- Electric Lightwave, Inc., a defunct American telecommunications company based in the state of Washington

== See also ==
- Eli, Eli (disambiguation)
- Elie (disambiguation)
- Ely (disambiguation)
