= Hans Schulte-Nölke =

Hans Schulte-Nölke (born January 31, 1963, in Olsberg/Germany) is a German jurist.

== Education and career ==
Schulte-Nölke studied at the University of Münster in Germany. From 1989 to 1992 he held a grant at the Johann Wolfgang Goethe University / Max Planck Institute for European Legal History) in Frankfurt's Graduate School for Medieval and Modern Legal History. In 1994 he obtained a PhD at the University of Münster. In 1995 he passed his second state examination and was until 1997 research assistant to Reiner Schulze at the University of Münster. After research stays at several European universities, including the Radboud University Nijmegen, he habilitated in 2000 in Münster.

In 2001, Schulte-Nölke was appointed professor of Civil Law, European Private Law, Comparative Law, German and European Legal History at Bielefeld University. Since 2008, he has been a Director of the European Legal Studies Institute and holds the Chair of Civil Law, European Private and Business Law, Comparative Law and European Legal History at the University of Osnabrück. In 2013 he was named an affiliate professor at the Radboud University Nijmegen.

== Publications ==
Schulte-Nölke is the author of various law review articles and legal commentaries, and:

- co-editor, with Christian von Bar and Eric Clive, of the Draft Common Frame of Reference for European Private Law (DCFR) published in 2009;
- co-editor, feasibility study of the European Commission on a Common European Sales Law (CESL).

== Honours and awards ==
Professor Schulte-Nölke was a co-founder of the European Law Institute. He is an elected member of the Academia Europaea and the American Law Institute.
