= Minister for Justice, Equality and Law Reform v Murphy =

Irish Supreme Court case

The Minister for Justice, Equality and Law Reform v Michael Murphy
- Coat of arms of Ireland
- Court: Supreme Court of Ireland
- Full case name: The Minister for Justice, Equality and Law Reform (Applicant/Respondent) v Michael Murphy (Respondent/Appellant)
- Decided: 19 March 2010
- Citation: [2010] IESC 17

Case history
- Appealed from: High Court
- Appealed to: Supreme Court

Court membership
- Judges sitting: Denham J, Macken J, Finnegan J.

Case opinions
- Decision by: Denham J

Keywords
- European Arrest Warrant 2003 | Detention Order | Extradition | Criminal Justice | Appeal |

Minister for Justice, Equality and Law Reform v Murphy, [2010] IESC 17; [2010] 3 IR 77, is an Irish Supreme Court case in which the Court determined that inpatient treatment with a restriction order attached to it in a European Arrest Warrant came within the meaning of "detention order" in s.10(d) of the European Warrant Act 2003. This gave the definition of "detention order" a wide meaning. The case involved an appeal against extradition to the United Kingdom.

== Background ==
The facts involved the issue as to whether a hospital order (i.e. inpatient treatment) with a restriction order attached to a European Arrest Warrant (EAW) would qualify as a "detention order" under the meaning of s.10(d) European Arrest Warrant Act 2003. s10(d) of this Act provides that:

"10. Where a judicial authority in an issuing state issues a European arrest warrant in respect of a person— …

- (d) on whom a sentence of imprisonment or detention has been imposed in respect of an offence to which the European arrest warrant relates, and who fled from the issuing state before he or she—
  - (i) commenced serving that sentence, or
  - (ii) completed serving that sentence, that person shall, subject to and in accordance with the provisions of this Act and the Framework Decision, be arrested and surrendered to the issuing state."

In this case, the EAW in question was connected to two offences, which were rape and assault occasioning actual bodily harm. The EAW related to a convicted mental patient who escaped from lawful custody. An order was made in the context of the Mental Health Act 1983 which contained preventative and punitive components. The appellant was sought by the United Kingdom on this warrant. In the High Court, the main issue was whether by the EAW the hospital order with its restrictions attached (which also contained an indefinite duration, subject to review of the Mental Health Tribunal) was a "detention order" (justifying the appellant's surrender to the United Kingdom). To the trial judge held:

"I am satisfied, and there is no room for controversy in this respect at least, that the Hospital Order and Restrictions is not regarded as a sentence of imprisonment under the law of the United Kingdom. That much is clear. Equally clear in my view is that it constitutes and order for the detention of the respondent, if one adopts a literal meaning of the word "detention". However, as Ms Donnelly has stated, it cannot be the case that every form of detention or deprivation of liberty comes within the meaning of a detention order under the Framework Decision and the Act. ... only a detention imposed or capable of being imposed following a conviction for a criminal offence has the capacity to be a detention for the purpose of the Framework Decision Council Framework Decision of 13 June 2002 on the European arrest warrant and the surrender procedures between Member States and the Act"

He concluded:

"it is therefore possible for this court to give an interpretation to the provisions of section 10(d) of the Act which is in conformity with the objectives and intent of the Framework Decision, and which is not contra legem [against the law]. It is that interpretation which must be given in those circumstances, rather than one which would exclude the respondent from being a person in respect of whom a European arrest warrant may be issued, thereby preventing his surrender."

== Holding of the Supreme Court ==
The Supreme Court upheld the judgement in the High Court and dismissed the appeal. As the hospital order had been handed down by a criminal court instead of a prison sentence, it constituted a “detention order”. The High Court was, therefore, correct in ordering the surrender of the appellant to the United Kingdom. As Denham J noted:

"I would define a detention order under s.10(d) as any order involving deprivation of liberty which has been made by a criminal court in addition to or instead of a prison sentence. In this case the detention order was made by a criminal court after conviction, for the extraditable offences of rape and assault occasioning bodily harm, instead of a prison sentence. Thus I am satisfied that s.10(d0 of the Act of 2003 applies to the detention order in this case.Consequently, for the reasons given, I would affirm the order of the High Court".

== Subsequent developments ==
This case was subsequently followed in Minister for Justice and Equality v Anthony Craig and Another [2015] IECA 102 in which the appellants also lost their appeals against extradition to UK regarding convictions of murder.
