= Jan F. and Antonie Janko Farmstead District =

Historic district in Iowa, United States

- U.S. National Register of Historic Places
- U.S. Historic district
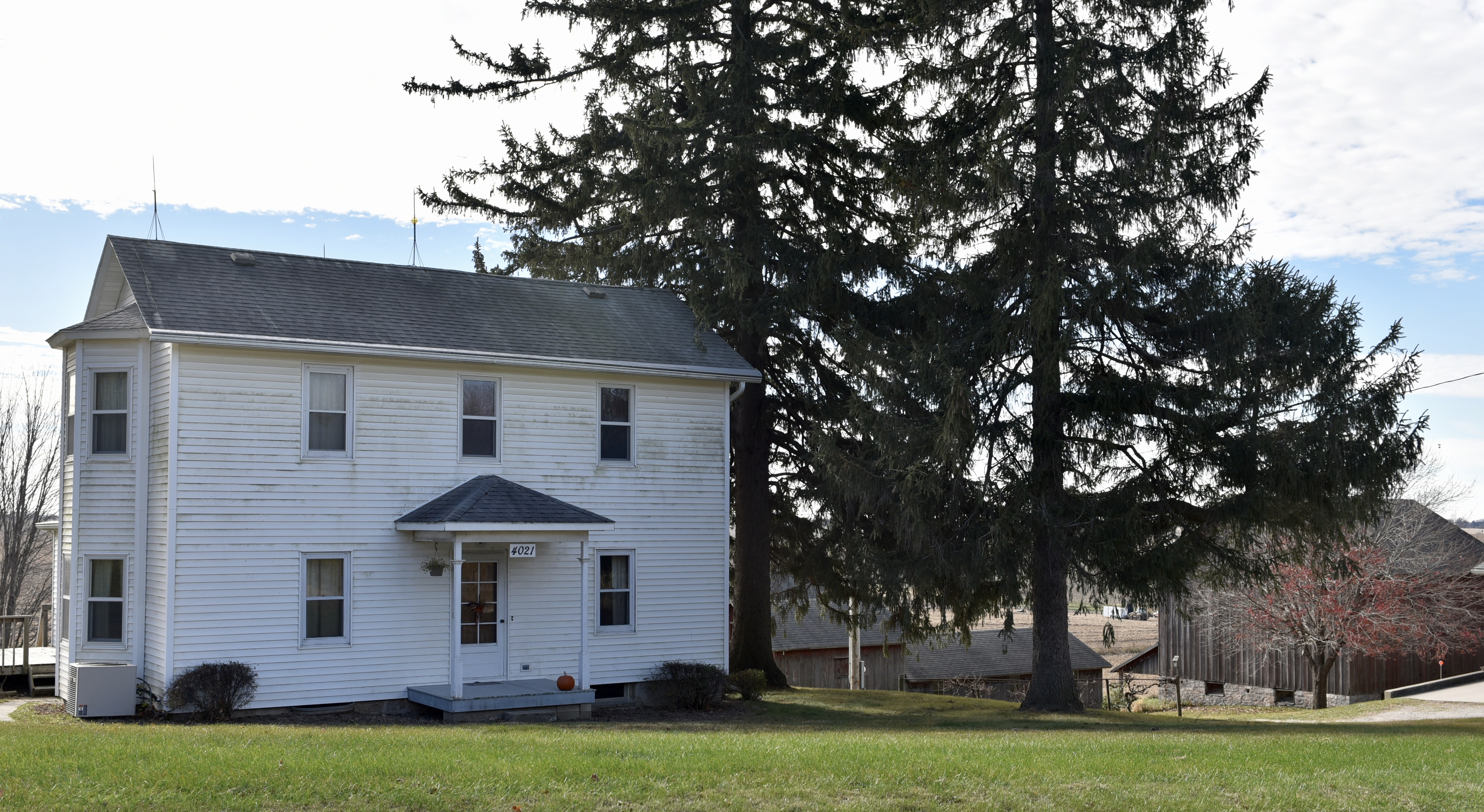

- Location within Iowa Location within the United States
- Location: 4021 Vista Rd. Ely, Iowa
- Coordinates: 41°52′26″N 91°36′17″W
- Area: 1.6 acres (0.65 ha)
- Built: 1875, 1887, 1893
- MPS: Early Settlement and Ethnic Properties of Linn County, Iowa MPS
- NRHP reference No.: 00001079
- Added to NRHP: September 14, 2000

The Jan F. and Antonie Janko Farmstead District is an agricultural historic district located west of Ely, Iowa, United States. It was listed on the National Register of Historic Places in 2000. At the time of its nomination it consisted of seven resources, which included five contributing buildings, one contributing structure, and one non-contributing structure. The historic buildings include a two-story, wood frame, side gable house (1887); a gabled basement barn (c. 1887); a gabled barn (1893); chicken house (1880s, with additions from the 1940s or 1950s), and a single-stall garage (1910s-1930s). The corncrib (1910s or 1920s) is the historic structure. A three-stall garage (1972) is the non-contributing structure. The farmstead is located on a hilltop and sideslope. The house sits on the highest elevation, with the outbuildings located down the slope to the west and southwest.

The first known owners of the farm were Isaac and Nancy Cox who farmed this property from at least 1859. Jan Janko settled here in 1864 and bought the property from the Cox's in 1875. From then until at least 2000 the farm has been owned by a Bohemian immigrant or a person of Bohemian descent. While the farm no longer reflects the initial settlement of Linn County, it does reflect the early settlement of Bohemian immigrants in the county. It is also significant that the original dwelling, probably a log cabin or log house, is no longer extant. Janko replaced the older house instead of adding onto it, which was more typical of the area's Bohemian immigrants.
