= Ely House =

Ely House may refer to:

== Ireland ==
- Ely Place, Dublin: No. 8 is Ely House, headquarters of the Knights of Saint Columbanus.

== United Kingdom ==
- Ely Place, a gated road at the southern tip of the London Borough of Camden in London, England.
- Ely Palace, the former London residence of the Bishops of Ely

== United States ==
- Ashe Cottage, Demopolis, Alabama, listed on the National Register of Historic Places (NRHP) in Marengo County, also known as Ely House
- Rev. John Ely House, Bethel, Connecticut, listed on the NRHP in Fairfield County
- Ely-Criglar House, Marianna, Florida, listed on the NRHP in Jackson County
- Mrs. C. Morse Ely House, Lake Bluff, Illinois, listed on the NRHP in Lake County, Illinois
- Ely Homestead, Lafayette, Indiana, listed on the NRHP in Tippecanoe County, Indiana
- Ely School House, Ely, Iowa, listed on the NRHP in Linn County, Iowa
- Smith-Ely Mansion, Clyde, New York, listed on the NRHP in Wayne County
- Hervey Ely House, Rochester, New York, listed on the NRHP in Monroe County
- Joshua Ely House, New Hope, Pennsylvania, listed on the NRHP in Bucks County, Pennsylvania
- Hamilton-Ely Farmstead, Whitely Township, Pennsylvania, listed on the NRHP in Greene County, Pennsylvania
- Richard T. Ely House, Madison, Wisconsin, listed on the NRHP in Dane County, Wisconsin

== See also ==
- Ely Block, Elyria, Ohio, listed on the NRHP in Lorain County, Ohio
- Ely Mound, Rose Hill, Virginia, listed on the NRHP in Lee County, Virginia
- Ely's Stone Bridge, Monticello, Iowa, listed on the NRHP in Jones County, Iowa
