= Susan Denham =

Irish judge (born 1945)

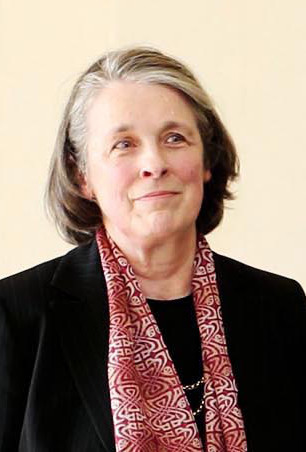

Chief Justice of Ireland
- In office 25 July 2011 – 28 July 2017
- Nominated by: Government of Ireland
- Appointed by: Mary McAleese
- Preceded by: John L. Murray
- Succeeded by: Frank Clarke

Judge of the Supreme Court
- In office 1 May 1992 – 28 July 2017
- Nominated by: Government of Ireland
- Appointed by: Mary Robinson

Judge of the High Court
- In office 11 July 1991 – 1 May 1992
- Nominated by: Government of Ireland
- Appointed by: Mary Robinson

Personal details
- Born: Susan Jane Gageby; 22 August 1945 (age 80) Sandymount, Dublin, Ireland
- Spouse: Brian Denham (m. 1992)
- Children: 4
- Education: Trinity College, Dublin; Columbia University; King's Inns

Susan Jane Denham, SC (née Gageby; born 22 August 1945) is a retired Irish judge who served as Chief Justice of Ireland from 2011 to 2017, she was the first woman to hold the position. She served as a Judge of the Supreme Court from 1992 to 2017, and was the third longest-serving member of the court on her retirement. She also served as a Judge of the High Court from 1991 to 1992.

== Early life ==
Susan Gageby was born in Dublin in 1945. She was educated at Alexandra College, Dublin. She is the daughter of the former editor of The Irish Times, Douglas Gageby, the sister of another barrister Patrick Gageby and maternal granddaughter of Seán Lester. She is from a Church of Ireland background.

She attended Trinity College Dublin (LL.B. 1969), the King's Inns, and the Law School of Columbia University, New York City (LL.M. 1972). She was involved with the Free Legal Advice Centres while studying in Dublin and was a founder and president of the Archaeology and Folklife Society at Trinity College.

== Legal career ==
She was called to the Bar in July 1971 and became a Senior Counsel in October 1987. She was the fourth woman to enter the Inner Bar. She became a senior counsel on the same day as future Supreme Court colleague Mary Laffoy. She worked on the Midland circuit until 1979, following which she was based in Dublin. She was involved in several leading cases while a junior barrister and a Senior Counsel, particularly in the area of judicial review.

== Judicial career ==
=== High Court and Supreme Court ===
She became a High Court judge in 1991. In 1992, at the age of 47, she was the first woman appointed to the Supreme Court. She was considered for appointment to the role of President of the High Court in 1994, but declined to have her name put forward. She made two dissents early on in her period on the Court. Throughout her tenure as a judge, she was seen by commentators to be a "liberal".

In Kelly v Hennessy in 1996, she outlined criteria for a court to consider the evidence of the existence of nervous shock in Ireland. In 2001, she was the sole member of the Supreme Court to dissent in TD v Minister for Education. The court overturned a decision of Peter Kelly in the High Court to direct the government to build secure care units for certain children. The majority held in the Supreme Court that it would violate the separation of powers for the judicial arm of government to direct how the state was to administer its resources which was a right reserved under the Constitution for the legislative and executive arms of government.

From 1995 to 1998, she chaired the Working Group on a Courts Commission, which was responsible for a significant reform of the organisation of the courts since the foundation of the state. It led to the establishment of the Courts Service. She was on the Interim Board of the Court Service and served on the Board of the Court Service from its inception, and chaired the board from 2001 to 2004. She chaired the Committee on Court Practice and Procedure which recommended in 2002 the establishment of a commercial court within the High Court.

From 2006, she chaired the Working Group on a Court of Appeal. The report of the group was published by the government in August 2009. It recommended the establishment of a general Court of Appeal. This was ultimately established in 2014, after a referendum in 2013.

Denham was part of the Irish delegation which, with the Netherlands and Belgium, established the European Network of Councils for the Judiciary (ENCJ) and she continues involvement in this Network. From 1 January 2015 to 31 December 2016, she was President of the Network of the Presidents of the Supreme Judicial Courts of the European Union which is an association of Supreme Court Presidents and Chief Justices of EU Member States.

=== Chief Justice of Ireland ===
On 4 July 2011, she was nominated by Taoiseach Enda Kenny to become Chief Justice of Ireland, and she was appointed as Chief Justice by President Mary McAleese on 25 July 2011. She was the first woman appointed to the office and as a member of the Church of Ireland, she was the first non-Catholic to hold the position. She was also the first graduate of Trinity College Dublin to have been appointed to the office; Chief Justices have largely been graduates of University College Dublin. She succeeded John L. Murray.

During her tenure as Chief Justice, the Supreme Court issued suspended declarations of unconstitutionality for the first time. The possibility of delaying the effect of a court declaration that a piece of legislation is contrary to the Constitution was first explored by Denham in A v Governor of Arbour Hill Prison. The court first adopted this approach in N.V.H v Minister for Justice & Equality in May 2017.

As Chief Justice, she oversaw changes in the operations of the Supreme Court and the courts generally. She oversaw the removal of the requirement for judges to wear wigs while hearing cases. In 2015, the Supreme Court sat outside Dublin for the first time since 1931, sitting in Cork. She corresponded with the Office of Public Works over the lack of heating in the Four Courts, threatening to cancel sittings if the issue was not resolved. She advocated for the inclusion of a new courtroom for the Supreme Court in plans to develop a new family court complex on Hammond Lane.

In her capacity as Chief Justice, she oversaw the administration of the Presidential Declaration of Office at the inauguration of President Michael D. Higgins in Dublin Castle in November 2011.

She retired from the position in July 2017 and was succeeded by Judge Frank Clarke. She was the third-longest serving Supreme Court judge ever at the time of her retirement. In her remarks on her retirement, she drew attention to the government's failure to institute a judicial council, having first attempted to persuade the government to establish one in 1997.

=== Post-retirement ===
In 2019, she was made an honorary fellow of Trinity College Dublin.

The Courts Service announced on 24 August 2020 that the Supreme Court had appointed her to review the attendance of Supreme Court judge Séamus Woulfe at a dinner organised by the Oireachtas Golf Society. She was appointed on a non-statutory basis as the relevant section in the Judicial Council Act 2019 on judicial conduct had not yet been commenced.

== Personal life ==
She is married to paediatrician Dr Brian Denham and they have four children.

From 1996 to 2010, Denham was a Pro-Chancellor of Trinity College, Dublin, the sole constituent college of the University of Dublin.

Legal offices
Preceded by John Murray	Chief Justice of Ireland; 2011–2017	Succeeded by Frank Clarke
