= Eli, Eli =

Eli, Eli may refer to:

- Eli, Eli, lama sabachthani 'My God, my God, why hast Thou forsaken me?', a phrase in the Old Testament or Hebrew Bible, the Book of Psalms, and the New Testament, as one of the sayings of Jesus on the cross.
- "A Walk to Caesarea", a song known by the opening words "Eli, Eli"

== See also ==
- Eli (disambiguation)
- El (deity)
- El (disambiguation)
