= Historic Ely Elevator =

- Woitishek-King-Krob Elevator
- U.S. Historic district – Contributing property
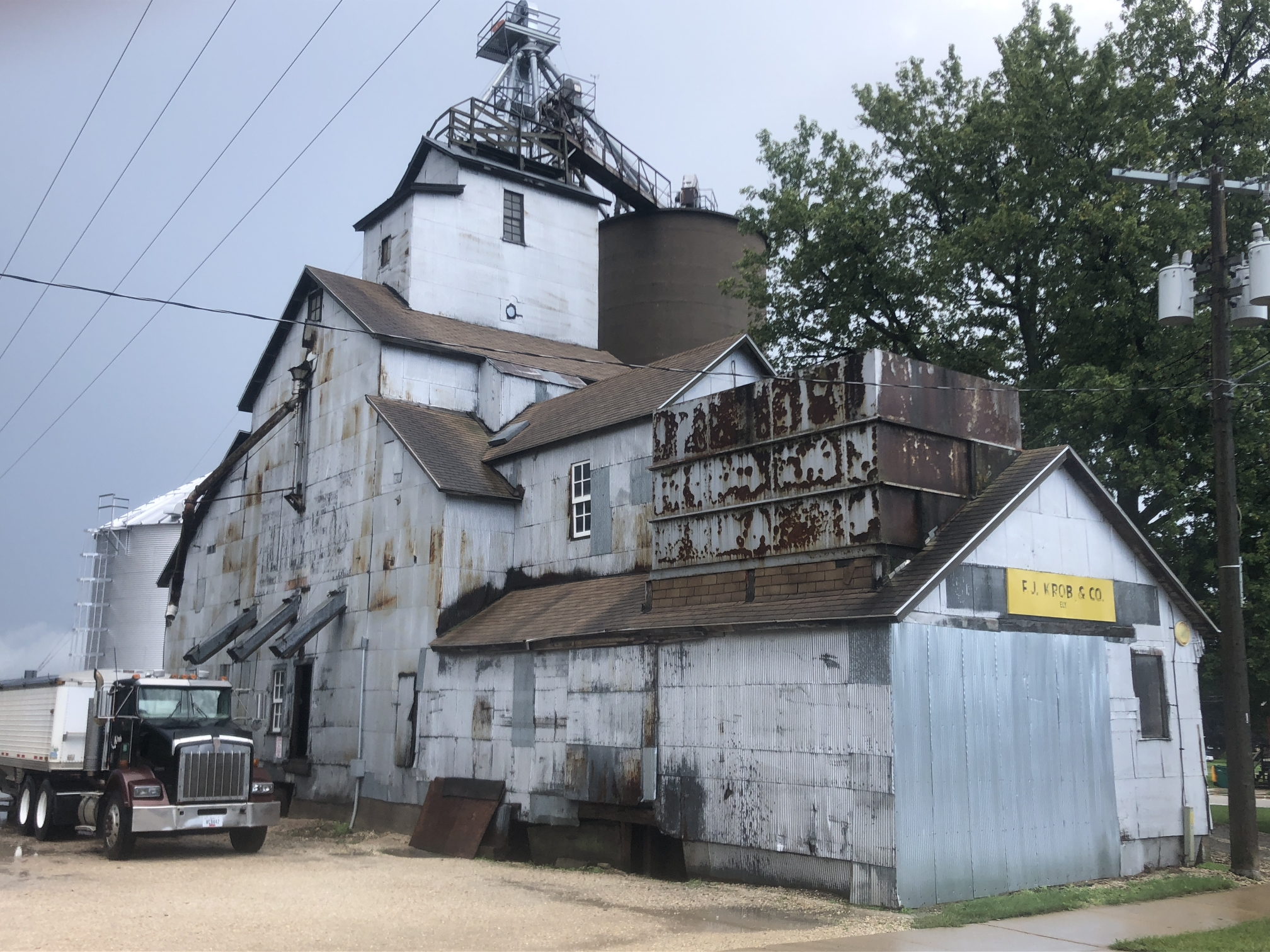
- Historic Ely Elevator in 2020

- Location within Iowa Location within the United States
- Location: 1748 Dows Street, Ely, Iowa
- Coordinates: 41°52′25″N 91°35′03″W
- Built: 1900
- Part of: Dows Street Historic District (ID02001026)
- Designated CP: November 14, 2003

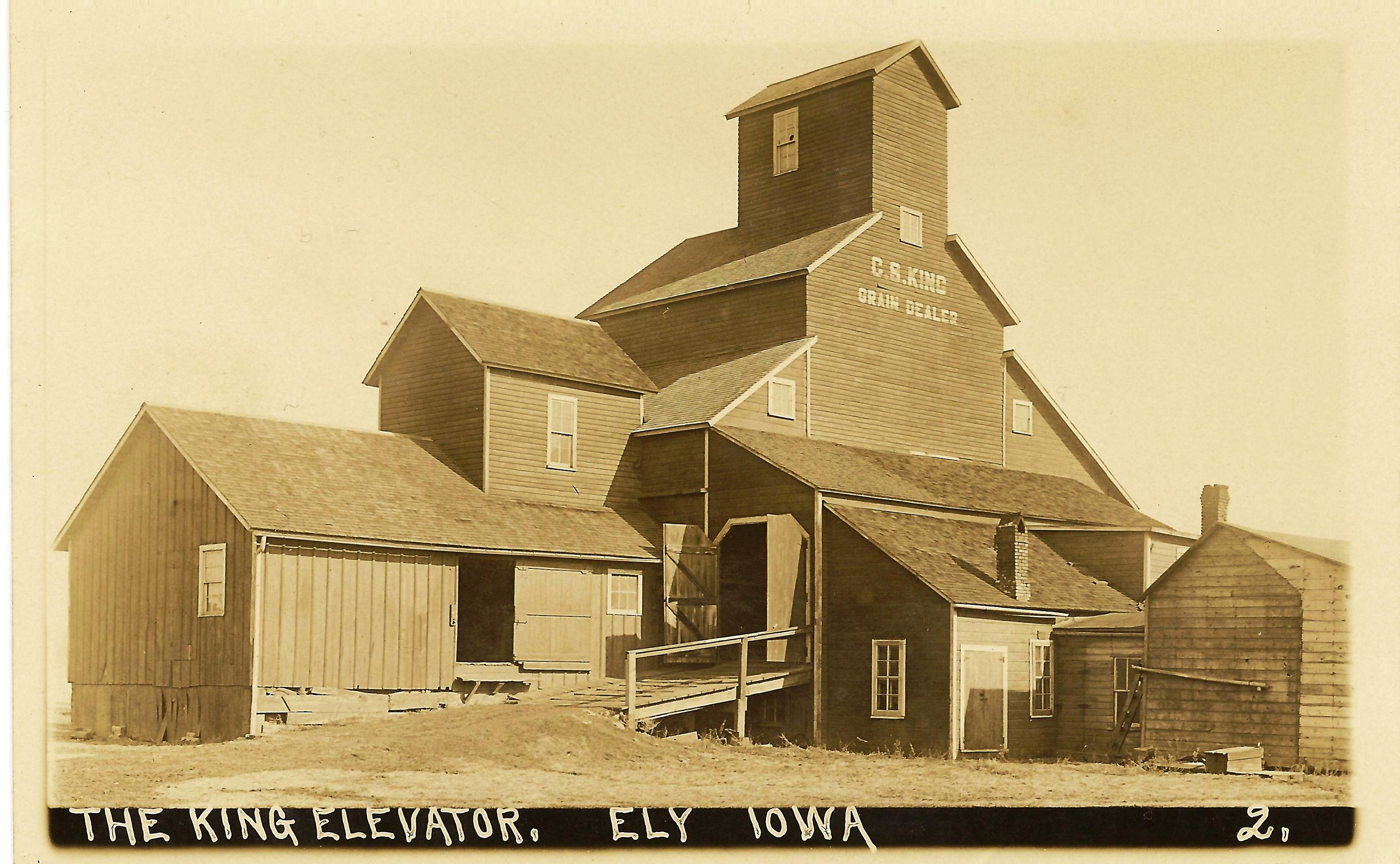
Post card of the Ely Elevator when it was owned by C.S. King

The Historic Ely Elevator, also known as the Woitishek-King-Krob Elevator and Feed Mill, is an "iron-clad" wood-cribbed grain elevator, located in Ely, Iowa. The Historic Ely Elevator was built in 1900 along the Burlington, Cedar Rapids and Northern Railway. It is a contributing property of the Dows Street Historic District, which is listed on the National Register of Historic Places.

== Early history ==
In 1900, Ely entrepreneur Joseph Woitishek commissioned an unknown contractor to erect an elevator on land originally owned by the Burlington, Cedar Rapids & Northern Railway, and leased to Woitishek (and successor owners King and Krob). The railroad would become the Chicago, Rock Island & Pacific in circa 1902. Construction was commenced in November 1900, and completed on December 13 of that same year. The December 19, 1900 Cedar Rapids Weekly Gazette featured a sketch of the west elevation of the elevator along with a story describing the construction and features of the 26,000 bushel elevator.

Grain, primarily corn and oats, was purchased from local farmers and shipped out on the railroad. Horses would pull grain-filled wagons up a ramp into the enclosed driveway, where the grain would first be weighed. The scale in the driveway was designed to raise the front axle of the wagon, while lowering the rear axle, and the grain was offloaded by hand into a receiving pit. From there it was elevated into bins via a wood-constructed vertical bucket elevator, which was powered by a 12-horsepower water-cooled gasoline engine. Once in the bins, the grain could then be unloaded onto railroad boxcars by gravity flow and shipped to other markets.

Corn that was brought in on the ear needed to be shelled, which is the process of separating the kernel from the cob. A corn sheller situated beneath the driveway was powered by the same gasoline engine that ran the bucket elevator, and switching between the sheller and the elevator was accomplished by simply moving the large flat belt from one wooden flywheel to another. Corn cobs would be piled outside, and on large crop production years, the cob piles could reach 25-foot (7.6 m) high and over 100-foot (30 m) in diameter. The cobs were sold to customers for livestock bedding, and in later years, they were also shipped to Cedar Rapids to a processing plant that utilized the cobs in the production of furfural.

The Ely Elevator was sold to Clement "C.S." King in April 1903. C.S. King had ownership in other area elevators, including Solon, Iowa and Buchanan, Iowa. In July 1904, King built a coal shed near the elevator for the purpose of selling coal for home heating. In years with particularly bitter winters, it often became the responsibility of the elevator to ration coal supplies to the community. King owned and operated the Ely Elevator until early 1910.

The Ely Elevator changed hands again on March 1, 1910, with first-generation Bohemian-American Frank Joseph "F.J." Krob and his brother-in-law Wes Fiala purchasing the building from King. Frank Krob had worked in his father Joseph Krob’s grain elevator in the nearby town of Lisbon, Iowa, also co-owned in partnership with Fiala. Frank managed the elevator from the beginning, and would eventually buy out Fiala's interest in the enterprise, whereupon the Ely Elevator was operated as F.J. Krob & Co.

In 1918, F.J. Krob shipped in its first railcar load of commercial fertilizer. That same year there was an interruption in the Ely Elevator operations, when Frank Krob joined the United States Army to serve in the First World War. He was promoted to sergeant and taught gas warfare at Camp Gordon, Georgia. He served the war stateside, and returned back to Ely in 1919.

In the 1920s the Ely Elevator became equipped for the processing of grain. A Sprout Waldron & Co Monarch Corn Cracker and Grading Outfit was purchased early in the decade, and then in 1928, more grind-and-mix feed equipment was installed, including the area’s first hammermill, which was powered by an 80-horsepower four-cylinder gasoline engine, and a one-ton vertical mixer.

Depressed commodity prices following the stock market crash of 1929 caused Frank Krob to temporarily lose the elevator, but after a brief period he regained ownership. As the economy recovered from the Great Depression, a 1938 epidemic of Equine Encephalitis swept the area, killing much of the local horse population. This event led the farmer customers of the Ely Elevator to adapt to utilizing tractors and trucks to deliver their grain to the elevator.

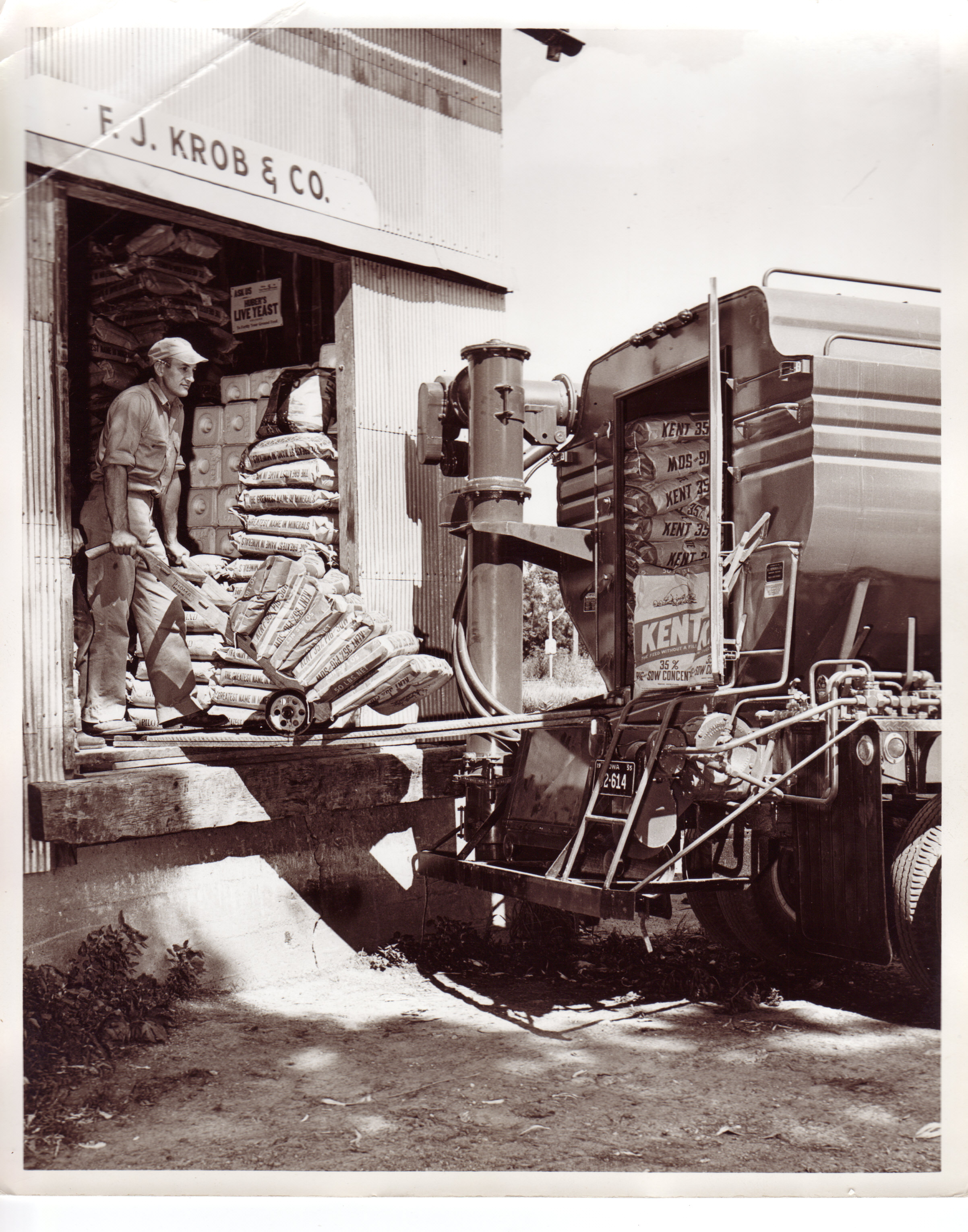
Robert Krob loading bagged feed out of the elevator warehouse.

In the early 1940s, spurred by the onset of the Second World War, the Ely Elevator began handling soybeans as area farmers began raising them in order to meet the demand for domestic sources of fats, oil, and meal. The war brought other changes to the elevator, when Frank’s sons Vic, Robert, and Norbert, and son-in-law John Phillips were all sent overseas to Europe to fight with both the Third Army and Ninth Army. The absence of Frank's three sons and son-in-law left Frank’s wife Libbie and daughter Martha to take on Rosie the Riveter-styled roles at the elevator. All four sons served in front line combat and survived the war, and then returned home to resume work at the elevator.

The shape of the Ely Elevator changed as grain storage capacity was expanded in the 1950s: Two 60-foot-tall slip-form concrete silos with a joint capacity of 38,100 bushels were erected next to the Ely Elevator. A 37,000 bushel Quonset hut was also added on an adjacent parcel, and initially used to store United States government-owned grain held for price support or in strategic reserve. Other modernizations occurred through the years, as the original wood-constructed bucket elevator was replaced by a higher-capacity steel grain leg, and the gas engines were replaced with electric motors. As farmers switched from using older-style corn pickers to harvest their corn on the ear to widely using more modern self-propelled combine harvesters, the corn sheller was eventually removed.

In 1952, Frank Krob retired, selling his interest in the elevator to his three sons, Vic, Robert, and Norbert, and son-in-law John Phillips.

== Architecture ==
The Historic Ely Elevator is oriented north-to-south in a rectilinear footprint measuring 87 feet (27 m) long by 24 feet (7.3 m) wide with an attached 34 by 12 foot (10.4 by 3.7 m) enclosed driveway to the west. The building rises some 57 feet (17 m) tall, roughly the height of a five-story building. The elevator incorporates in plan four contiguous sections: A central grain bins section flanked by a feed mill section to the north, a seed cleaning/corn cracking room to the south, and to the west an enclosed ramped driveway. At the center of the bins section is a grain bagging room. A non-extant bagged feed warehouse was added to the south of the seed cleaning room circa 1930s, but was removed in 2018 due to compromised structural integrity and safety concerns.

Exterior walls are clad with corrugated lapped galvanized steel siding added after construction over the underlying red-painted wood barnboard and clapboard siding as fire protection from sparks created by train engines. This was a common practice for wood-sided elevators, and is the source of the colloquialism "iron-clad elevator."

While most of the buildings in the Ely Dows Street Historic District employ vernacular commercial forms and architectural detailing popular in Iowa during the late Victorian period, including boomtown fronts and cornices supported by brackets, the Historic Ely Elevator stands out in the Historic District as the only industrial property, the tallest building, and as the only contributing building clad in corrugated metal.

The Historic Ely Elevator encompasses about 2,500 sq ft (230 m^{2}), including the enclosed driveway. Just as on the exterior, the interior is unadorned. The exposed structure primarily consists of wood: Wood plank floors are framed with wood joists that frame into timber beams supported by wood columns, which are supported by concrete blocks, large rocks, or concrete pit walls. Walls are wood framing with wood sheathing/siding in some areas, and cribbed timber in others. The building is crowned by a series of gable roofs and has minimal fenestration.

The central bins section is the tallest portion of the building, reaching 57 feet (17 m) to the peak. The bins section contains the grain leg (or bucket elevator), and manlift, both extending vertically to the headhouse cupula at the top of the elevator; a steel ladder also provides a second means of human egress up to the headhouse. The 24 ft (7.3 m)-square central grain bins section is constructed of cribbed timber walls (perimeter and interior walls, with 2x4 lumber stacked flat and spiked). This section houses six 20 to 30 foot (6.1 to 9.1 m) tall grain bins; three each at the north and south sides of the 8 foot (2.4 m)-wide central bagging room, plus three more overhead bins. Wooden dispensing chutes provide access to the stored grain within the bins.

Described as being designed with a focus on function over form, the entire structure of a grain elevator is a complex and sometimes overlapping arrangement of wood and steel chutes, dump pits, bins, ladders, augers, auger pits, ropes, pulleys, and the central bucket elevator, all designed to move grain throughout the system.

=== Architectural features ===
==== Manlift ====
The term “manlift” refers to a manually operated, hand-powered elevator which operates on a traditional system of weights and pulleys. The wooden elevator car is designed for one person, is equipped with a foot brake and an emergency cable-tension release brake, and slides up and down on two vertical wooden rails. A steel cable attached to the top of the car extends up over a pulley at the top of the elevator shaft, and is connected to a 250 lb (110 kg) counterweight. To operate the lift, the operator steps on a round foot brake pedal and pulls on a stationary rope which runs from the bottom of the elevator shaft to the top. This allows the counter weight to drop as the car travels up, and vice versa.

In November 1968, the brake on the car failed and it traveled to the top of the shaft. An employee who was on a landing platform 40 feet (12 m) off the ground did not realize that the car was no longer there, and stepped off the platform, falling down nearly the entire length of the elevator shaft. The employee survived, but injured both legs, and dragged himself to the nearest phone to call for help.

==== Headhouse ====
The headhouse cupula, or upper-level housing for the distributor and bin spouts, is the top-most floor of the elevator. The manlift provides access directly to the headhouse, as does a steel ladder. The headhouse is approximately 8 by 16 feet (2.4 by 4.9 m), and has a vaulted ceiling approximately 15 feet (4.6 m) high, to what is the highest peak of the building. The top of the grain leg extends up to the building peak, and the grain that is elevated up to the top is then funneled down by gravity to the distributor spout. In the floor of this room are open holes in semicircle configuration. The distributor spout swivels and is connected by a steel shaft and rotated by the distributor selector wheel (50 feet (15 m) below in the bagging room). In this manner it can be positioned over any one of the holes in the floor, which are openings to more spouts which direct the grain to the various wood-cribbed bins below.

==== Ladder to Nowhere ====
“Ladder to Nowhere” was a moniker bestowed by employees to a ladder atop the concrete silos. The ladder was designed to provide access to the distributor on the outside grain leg, and is characterized by its aslant angles, minimal safety features, height above the ground (approximately 75 feet (23 m)), and the fact that it does not reach or attach to any particular destination, hence the term “Ladder to Nowhere.” The ladder is no longer in use.

==== Driveway ====
The Driveway was the primary area for receiving grain. It is an enclosed space measuring 34 feet (10 m) long by 12 feet (3.7 m) wide with heavy plank flooring, and features two steel-bar grated grain dump pits, as well as a trap door grain dump pit, and double 12-foot (3.7 m) tall side-hinged doors on both ends. Circa 1930, the Driveway roof was raised several feet to its present 20-foot (6.1 m) height in order to accommodate the hoisting of wagons. The Driveway has through the years accommodated horse-drawn wagons, tractors with wagons, and semi trucks pulling hopper bottom trailers. The Driveway was taken out of use in 2014 due to the safety concerns of driving 80,000-pound semis through the aging structure.

==== Clipper Room ====
The Clipper Room is the name used to describe the section of the elevator which houses antique seed cleaning and corn cracking equipment. The term "Clipper" refers to the Clipper single fan seed cleaner, manufactured by AT Ferrell & Co and installed in 1950. The room also features a 1920s-era Sprout Waldron & Co Monarch Corn Cracker and Grading Outfit. Built on a hardwood frame, it consists of a rotary cutter, grader, separator, and suction fan, all operated by a 5 hp motor which drove a series of flat belt pulleys.

== Present ==
As of 2025, the Ely Elevator is still in operation, under fourth-generation ownership as FJ Krob & Co. In January 2020, the Ely Elevator received individual designation on the National Register of Historic Places. The company is currently engaged in efforts toward historic preservation and adaptive reuse, with the goal of opening the building to the public as a historic landmark.
