= Network of the Presidents of the Supreme Judicial Courts of the European Union =

International organization of heads of highest ordinary court in EU

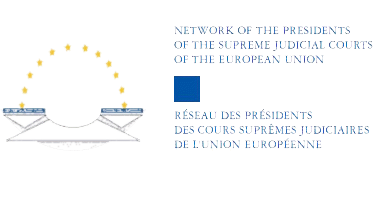
Logo.

The Network of the Presidents of the Supreme Judicial Courts of the European Union is the association of the Presidents and Chief Justices of the Supreme Judicial courts of the member states of the European Union.

The Network was created on 10 March 2004 at the French Court of Cassation in Paris. Its members meet to discuss matters of common interest and shared concern and to exchange ideas and information. It is meant to provide a forum through which European institutions can request the opinions of Supreme Courts. The Network has an observer status at the European Law Institute.

The members of the Network hold an annual colloquium and other meetings. Since 2007, the Network has also been running a shared portal which allows access to the case law of the Supreme Courts. Also, the Network organizes internships for members of the Supreme Courts.

The Network has its seat at the French Court of Cassation in Paris and is supported financially by the European Union. Priit Pikamäe, president of the Supreme Court of Estonia, became chair of the network in 2017, following Susan Denham, the then Chief Justice of Ireland, who had been president since 2015.

The presidents of the Supreme Courts of Liechtenstein, Montenegro and Norway enjoy an observer status. The Presidents of the Court of Justice of the European Union and the European Court of Human Rights also participate in the general assemblies and colloquiums of the Network.
