= Dows Street Historic District =

Historic district in Iowa, United States

- U.S. National Register of Historic Places
- U.S. Historic district
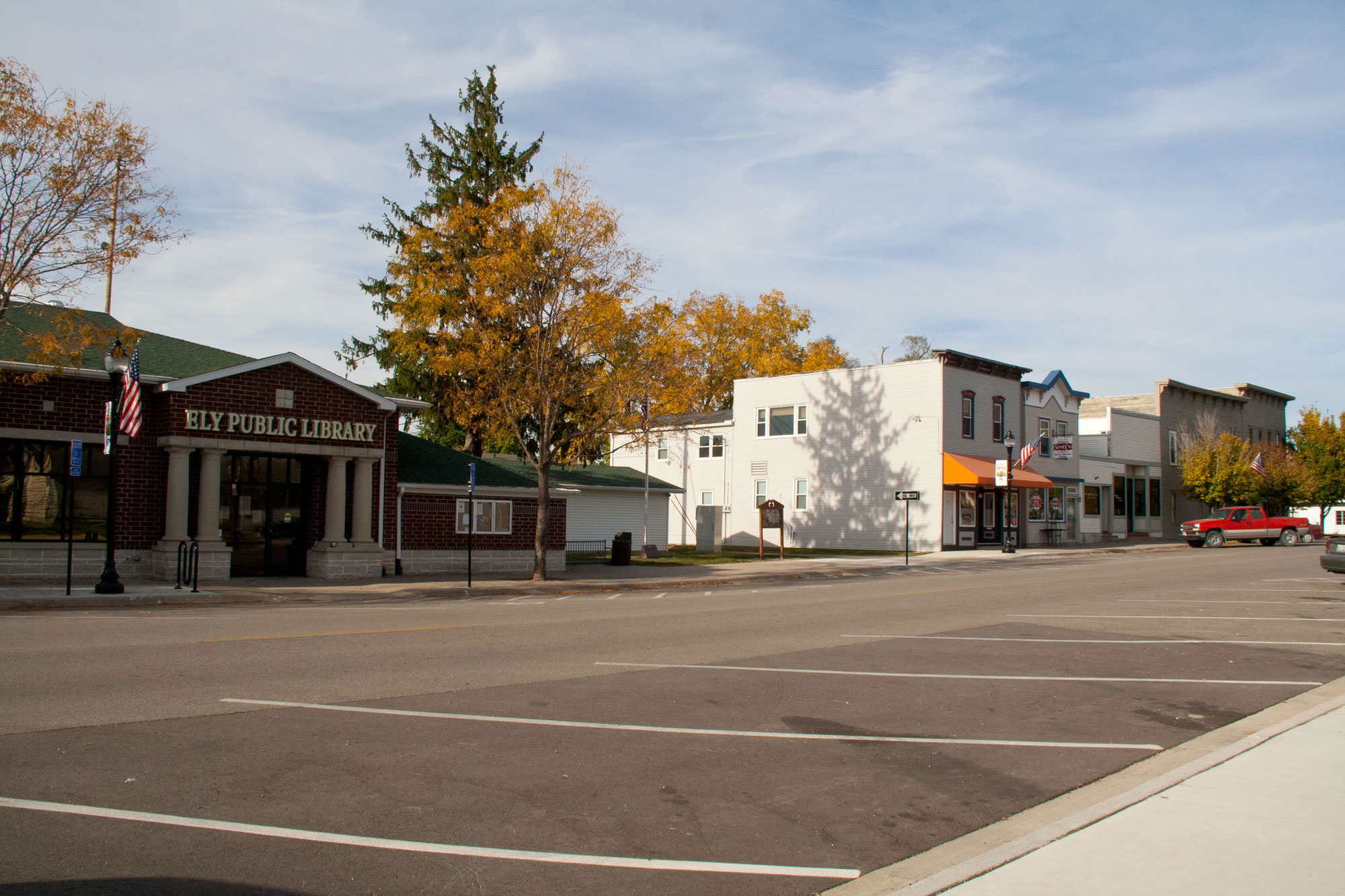

- Location within Iowa Location within the United States
- Location: Dows St. between State and Main Sts., Ely, Iowa
- Coordinates: 41°52′23″N 91°35′10″W
- Architectural style: Late Victorian; Late 19th And 20th Century Revivals
- NRHP reference No.: 02001026
- Added to NRHP: November 14, 2003

The Dows Street Historic District is located in Ely, Iowa, United States. The area exemplifies the importance the railroad and transportation in general played in the development of the town's central business district. Community members revitalized a plat of land the railroad had abandoned into a commercial and residential corridor. The historic district is made up of several frame buildings typical of the Late Victorian style. It has been listed on the National Register of Historic Places since 2003.

== Contributing properties ==
The Historic Ely Elevator is the only light-industrial property in the district which includes mostly small commercial buildings and residences.
