= N.V.H v Minister for Justice & Equality =

Irish Supreme Court case

N.H.V. v Minister for Justice & Equality
- Coat of arms of Ireland
- Court: Supreme Court of Ireland
- Full case name: N.H.V. v Minister for Justice & Equality
- Neutral citation: [2017] IESC 35
- Reported at: [2018] 1 I.R. 246; [2017] 1 I.L.R.M. 105

Court membership
- Judges sitting: Denham C.J., O'Donnell, Clarke, MacMenamin, Laffoy, Charleton, O'Malley JJ.

Case opinions
- The Court upheld a challenge to the absolute prohibition on employment of asylum seekers
- Decision by: O'Donnell Donal J.

Keywords
- Constitution; Personal Rights; Right to employment; Deferred declarations

N.H.V. v Minister for Justice & Equality [2017] IESC 35 was an Irish Supreme Court case in which the Court upheld a challenge to the absolute prohibition on employment of asylum seekers contained in Section 9(4) of the Refugee Act 1996 and held it to be contrary to the constitutional right to seek employment.

== Background ==
The appellant in this case was a Burmese national who arrived in Ireland on 16 July 2008. He applied for refugee status - this was refused and on appeal by the Refugee Appeals Tribunal in 2009. The appellant sought a judicial review of that decision - this judicial review application was upheld in July 2013. The appellant then needed to restart the application process which resulted in a further refusal. This refusal was upheld by the Refugee Appeals Tribunal. However, that decision was itself quashed in February 2014, and the application process was restarted.

The appellant had been in direct provision for nearly six years and there would be a further delay before his application was finalised. If his application was unsuccessful he could apply for subsidiary protection, which would also take a number of years.

In May 2013, the appellant was offered employment in the direct provision facility. He applied for permission to take up this employment to the Minister for Justice and Equality. However, the Minister for Justice and Equality refused on the grounds that such employment was prohibited by section 9(4) of the Refugee Act 1996.

=== Decision of the High Court ===
The appellant commenced proceedings seeking to challenge the Minister for Justice and Equality's interpretation of Section 9(4) and/or to seek a declaration of the incompatibility of Section 9(4) with the EU Charter of Fundamental Rights, the European Convention on Human Rights, and the Irish Constitution. The claim was dismissed by the High Court and the Court of Appeal upheld that decision.

A further issue arose regarding mootness. The Supreme Court granted leave to appeal on 27 April 2016. However, in the period between the decision allowing the appeal and the hearing itself, the appellant was granted refugee status. The State then contended that the appeal was moot (pointless).

== Holding of the Supreme Court ==
The Supreme Court found that while the matter was substantially moot, the Supreme Court held that is should nevertheless hear and make a determination on this appeal. This was due to the claims being constitutionally challenged. As the Supreme Court noted "A person affected by the operation of a statute which he or she contends is unconstitutional, may be entitled to maintain the claim even if the statute is no longer being applied to them." The potential mootness arose after the Court had granted leave to appeal. The grant of leave to appeal to the Court established that there is a point of law of "general public importance arising". Also, the court considered the circumstances likely to recur and so it was desirable that it should be dealt with.

=== Substantive issue ===
The court found that the state could restrict the employment of asylum seekers. It held that the complete ban on asylum seekers working while awaiting determination of asylum claims was "in principle" unconstitutional and contrary to the constitutional right to seek employment.

The court found that as the situation arose due to "the intersection of a number of statutory provisions": and could arguably be met by alteration of them. It held that as that was first and foremost a matter for executive and legislative judgement, the court adjourned consideration of the order the Court for a period of six months and invited the parties to make submissions on the form of the order.

== Subsequent developments ==
C. v The Minister for Social Protection, Ireland and The Attorney General [2018] IESC 57 cites N.V.H. v Minister for Justice & Equality in relation to "the exceptional use of deferred declarations."

Xi Mei Lin, Xing Jian Zheng, Xin Yi Lin (A Minor Suing by her Mother, Next Friend Xi Mei Lin), Zoe Xin Yue Zheng (A Minor Suing by her Mother and Next Friend Xi Mei Lin) v The Minister for Justice and Equality cites N.V.H v Minister for Justice & Equality as showing the freedom to work is a fundamental part of human personality and that "errors in relation to employment prospects might not necessarily be fatal in every case but come into focus where the employment issue is central to the decision and where, on particular facts, the applicants have a clear position of employment or self-employment which was not properly considered."

It has been claimed that this and other similar cases points to the need to reform the direct provision system.
