= Ely College =

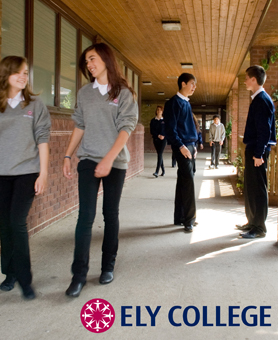
- Ely College students, 2011

Location
- Downham Road; Ely, Cambridgeshire, CB6 2SH; England; 52.4071°N 0.2577°E

Information
- Type: Academy, Secondary and Sixth Form College
- Established: 1972 (as City of Ely College)
- Trust: Meridian Trust
- Department for Education URN: 143404 Tables
- Ofsted: Reports
- Principal: Simon Warburton
- Gender: Coeducational
- Age: 11 to 18
- Enrolment: 1,450
- Website: http://www.elycollege.com/

Ely College is a secondary academy school located in Ely, Cambridgeshire.

== History ==
In 1957 Ely High School for Girls moved out of the centre of Ely to an extensive site on Downham Road. St Audrey's Infant School was built nearby on the site around the same time. In 1969 a donation from the Catherine Needham Foundation, a local charitable trust set up in memory of Lady Catherine Needham, enabled the establishment of the Needham's County Secondary School adjacent to the High School. In September 1972 Ely High School and Needham's Secondary Modern School merged to become the City of Ely College as part of the change to comprehensive education in Ely. The College was located in the former Needham's building and a Sixth Form College for pupils from the wider area (Ely, together with Soham, Littleport & Witchford Village Colleges) was established in the old Girls' High School building. Subsequently, they became the City of Ely Community College. In 2011 the school was renamed Ely College.

In September 2010, the College's governors adopted Foundation status, and in 2011, they applied to the Secretary of State to change to Academy status, proposing to join the CfBT Schools Trust, an Academies Trust formed by CfBT, one of the UK's leading educational charities. Ely College joined the Trust in January 2012, but then joined the CMAT group of schools in September 2016 instead.

== CMAT and the House System ==
CMAT was formed in 2011. The Trust began as Cambridge Meridian Education Trust (CMET) in March 2009 to promote the new schools at Northstowe, a new town proposed between Swavesey and Cambridge. The trust started with Swavesey Village College. In March 2011 CMET became Cambridge Meridian Academies Trust (CMAT), a multi-academy trust, so that Swavesey Village College could convert to an academy and sponsor other academies. In April 2022, the trust changed its name from 'CMAT' to the 'Meridian Trust' with 28 schools across Cambridgeshire, Bedford and Lincolnshire'

Ely College is organised into six 'Houses', each of which consist of around 250 students, 12 tutor groups and 30 staff. Houses are responsible for monitoring and ensuring the welfare and progress of the students; each House has a distinct identity, but applies common structures and systems. They are named Etheldreda (after Saint Etheldreda), Scott (after explorer Robert Scott of the Antarctic), Franklin (after scientist Rosalind Franklin), Turing (after mathematician Alan Turing), Seacole (after Mary Seacole, the British-Jamaican nurse in the Crimean War) and Equiano (after Olaudah Equiano, writer and abolitionist). This house system is used in many of the Meridian Trust academies.

Each house is represented by a different house colour on their respective Logos. To differentiate the students, their ties and PE uniform match their house colours. As well, each form group gets a unique code based upon their form tutor's teacher's code and the first two letters of their house name.

- Etheldreda (Et) - Yellow
- Franklin (Fr) - Green
- Scott (Sc) - Red
- Seacole (Se) - Purple
- Turing (Tu) - Blue
- Equiano (Eq) - Orange

== Bishop Laney ==
Bishop Laney (named after Ely's Bishop who lived from 1590-1674), formerly Ely College Sixth Form, is a Sixth Form in Ely, sharing some of the property with Ely College. Also one of the Meridian Trust schools as well as part of the Staploe Education Trust, it is an ongoing partnership between Ely College and Soham Village College. The Sixth Form provides both traditional A-Level courses and Level 2 and 3 Technical Awards. It also works with Norwich City Football Club to provide a football course, which can be taken alongside other courses. The Sixth Form takes part in many activities with the College.

Most recently, they opened their refurbished Needhams Tower facility (four stories) for the sixth form. They received £5 million in funding as a part of the governments 'Post-16 Capacity Fund'.

== Zero tolerance controversy ==
In April 2011 the Daily Express dubbed Ely College "Britain's strictest school". In a newsletter to parents that month, Headteacher Catherine Jenkinson-Dix had issued a warning about the introduction of a zero-tolerance policy for the school, rigidly enforcing existing policies on school uniforms and discipline, plus restricting the use of mobile phones and iPods. Defending the action, she stated: "This is fundamental in preparing them for their future careers, where they certainly would not get away with being rude, dressing inappropriately and chewing gum."

The school came under scrutiny in the national press over detentions. The Daily Mirror reported that on one day, one-fifth of the schools pupils were put in detention for "a crackdown on school behaviour". Some parents were supportive and by the following month Catherine Jenkinson-Dix was claiming the policy to have been a success, saying that it had enabled teachers to spend more time teaching as they are dealing with fewer distractions in the classroom.

== Ofsted reports ==
In 2013, Ofsted rated Ely College as 'Good'.

In 2015, Ofsted rated Ely College as 'Inadequate' and requiring special measures.

In 2019, Ofsted rated Ely College as ‘Good’ overall with ‘Outstanding’ effectiveness of leadership and management.
