= Council of the Notariats of the European Union =

European nonprofit organisation of notaries

- Founded: 1976
- Headquarters: Brussels, Belgium
- Members: Notariats of 22 European countries
- Official languages: English, French
- Website: www.cnue.eu

The Council of the Notariats of the European Union (CNUE) is a nonprofit organisation of notaries from 22 European countries. The CNUE is the official body representing the notariat in dealings with the institutions of the European Union. Speaking for the profession, it expresses the joint decisions of its members to the European Union.

== History ==
The Conference of the Presidents of the Notariats of the six founding countries of the European Economic Community (Belgium, France, Germany, Italy, Luxembourg, and the Netherlands) was founded in Paris in 1976, with its memorandum of understanding signed under the auspices of and within the framework of the International Union of Notaries.

In 1989, the Conference of the Presidents became the Permanent Conference of the Notariats of the European Community, thereby affirming its nature as a supranational association of notaries. In 1995, it became the Conference of the Notariats of the European Union (CNUE), and then adopted its current name of Council of the Notariats of the European Union on January 1, 2006. In 1996 the CNUE introduced a one-year presidency system, following the model of other European institutions.

Since 1992, the CNUE has been constantly evolving, in terms of both its internal structure and its functions. Over the years the CNUE has become progressively larger, first with the addition of Spain, Portugal, and Austria. Nine additional notariats became members in 2004 in parallel with the enlargement of the EU, enabling the organisation to make a significant leap from 10 to 19 members. Bulgaria and Romania joined in 2007, bringing the number of member notariats to 21 of the 27 EU Member States. On July 1, 2013, the Croatian notariat also joined the CNUE.

== Members ==
The CNUE represents the Latin-type notariats of all EU Member States familiar with this institution:

- Austria (Österreichische Notariatskammer)
- Belgium (Conseil International du Notariat Belge)
- Bulgaria (Chambre des Notaires de Bulgarie)
- The Czech Republic (Notarska komora Ceske republiky)
- Croatia (Hrvatska javnobilježnicka komora)
- Estonia (Eesti Vabriigi Notarite Koda)
- France (Conseil Supérieur du Notariat Français)
- Germany (Bundesnotarkammer)
- Greece (Conseil National du Notariat Grec)
- Hungary (Magyar Országos Közjegyzoi Kamara)
- Italy (Consiglio Nazionale del Notariato)
- Latvia (Latvijas Zverinatu notaru padome)
- Lithuania (Lietuvos Notaru Rumai)
- Luxembourg (Chambre des Notaires du Grand-Duché de Luxembourg)
- Maltag (Kunsill Notarili ta' Malta)
- The Netherlands (Koninklijke Notariële Beroepsorganisatie)
- Poland (Krajowa Rada Notarialna)
- Portugal (Ordem dos Notarios Portugal)
- Romania (Uniunea Nationala a Notarilor Publici din România)
- Slovakia (Notárska komora Slovenskej republiky)
- Slovenia (Notarska Zbornica Slovenije)
- Spain (Consejo General del Notariado)

The Turkish notariat (Turkiye Noterler Birligi) gained observing member status in March 2013. The CNUE has seven other observer members. These are the notariats of the following countries: Albania, Georgia, Moldova, Montenegro, the Republic of North Macedonia, Serbia and Ukraine.

The European notariats are represented in the CNUE by the presidents of the national notarial bodies. The CNUE is supervised by a President, the CNUE's spokesperson, who has tenure for one year, renewable for one year.

== Mission ==
The CNUE's mission is to promote the notariat as a cornerstone of preventive justice. It contributes actively to any decision-making processes of the European institutions. This involves areas including the legal aspects of citizenship and running a business, access to justice and consumer protection.

Furthermore, the CNUE keeps its members updated on developments in European legislation and any initiatives taken by the EU institutions. It also assists in the continuous training of notaries in European Union law.

The CNUE does not, however, limit itself only to following EU work; it also makes proposals. It implements projects with a European dimension involving all its members, with the aim of constructing the area of justice, freedom and security expected by European citizens.

== The CNUE at the service of citizens ==
The CNUE provides online resources for members of the public and legal professionals. Most of these projects have been carried out with the support of the European Union.

For example, the ‘Successions Europe’ website provides access to inheritance law in the 22 European Union countries with a notarial system. Other information websites have been set up along the same lines: “Couples in Europe”, The Vulnerable in Europe, Buying Property in Europe and Authentic Acts in Europe.

The European Directory of Notaries, meanwhile, enables users to find a Latin-type notary throughout Europe who speaks their language.

== The CNUE at the service of notaries ==
Established with the support of the European Union, the European Notarial Network (ENN) assists notaries in handling cross-border cases by providing a range of practical and informative tools via a secure platform.

To facilitate the search for a will in Europe, Notaries of Europe have established the European Network of Registers of Wills Association (ENRWA). Operational since 2002, the ENRWA, through the secure interconnection of various national registers, enables searches within the European Union for the testamentary dispositions of a deceased person. Following the adoption of European Regulation No 650/2012 on international successions, the ENRWA is also working on the creation and interconnection of registers of European Certificates of Succession (ECS). Today, thirteen will registers and five ECS registers are interconnected through the ENRWA.
