= Ely's Stone Bridge =

- U.S. National Register of Historic Places
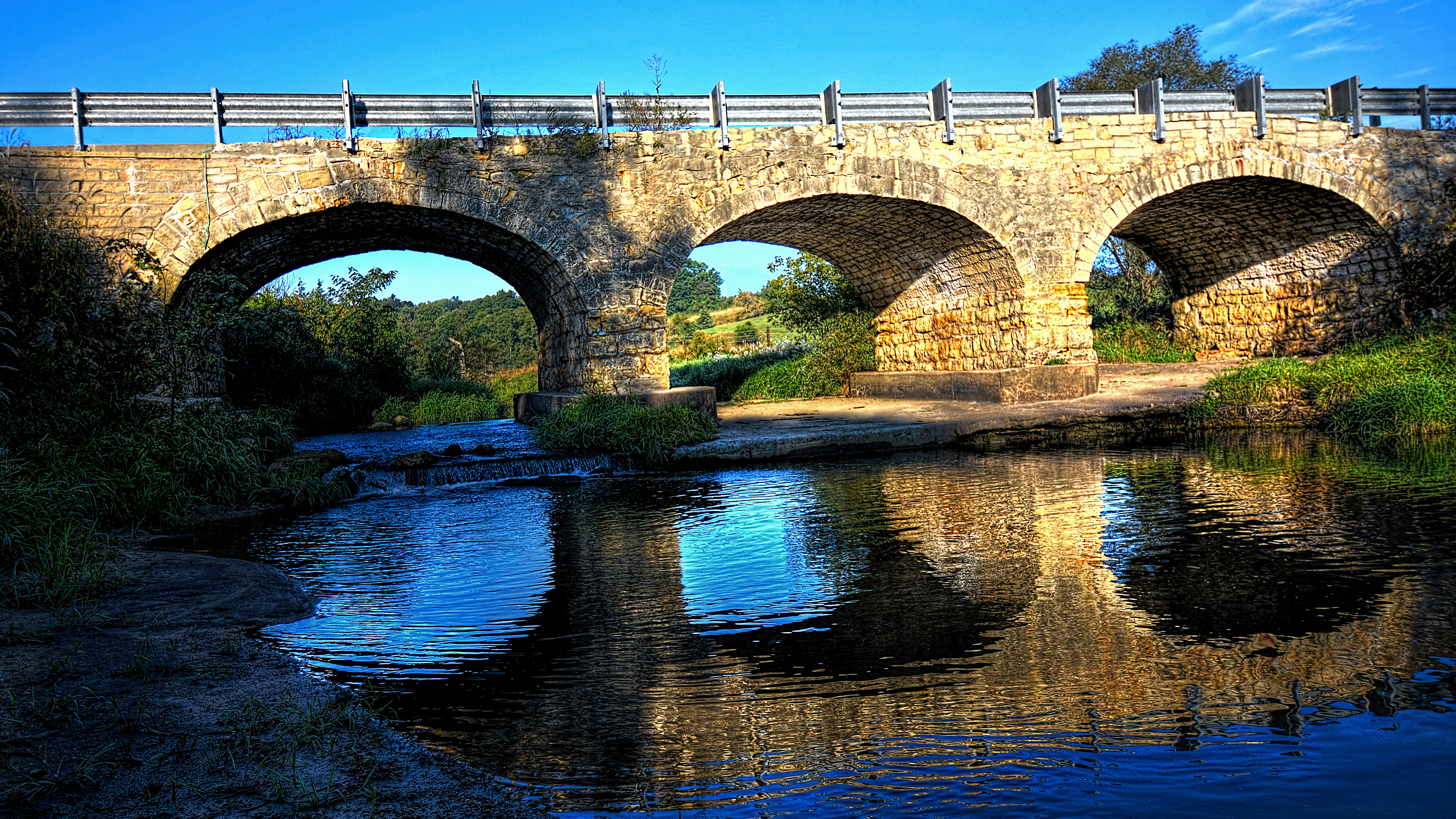

- Location within Iowa Location within the United States
- Location: Stone Bridge Road; Monticello, Iowa
- Coordinates: 42°15′24″N 91°13′31″W
- Area: less than one acre
- Built: 1893
- Built by: Reuben Ely, Sr. and Reuben Ely, Jr.
- NRHP reference No.: 79000908
- Added to NRHP: March 7, 1979

Ely's Stone Bridge is a bridge that was listed on the National Register of Historic Places in 1979. The bridge was built across Deer Creek in 1893 by Reuben Ely, Sr., a farmer, and his son Reuben Ely, Jr. The bridge is a three-span arch bridge made of stone from the stream bed and quarries in Anamosa, Iowa.

There are no bridges like it in the area, and it seems to have been a "personal expression" of the stonemasons. The bridge was maintained by four generations of stonemasons in the family.

The bridge had been tuckpointed in 1933 and 1957 and was assessed to be in excellent condition in 1979. As of 2008, the foundation of the bridge had recently been reinforced with concrete.
