= Eli, Nebraska =

Unincorporated community in Nebraska, United States

- Unincorporated Community
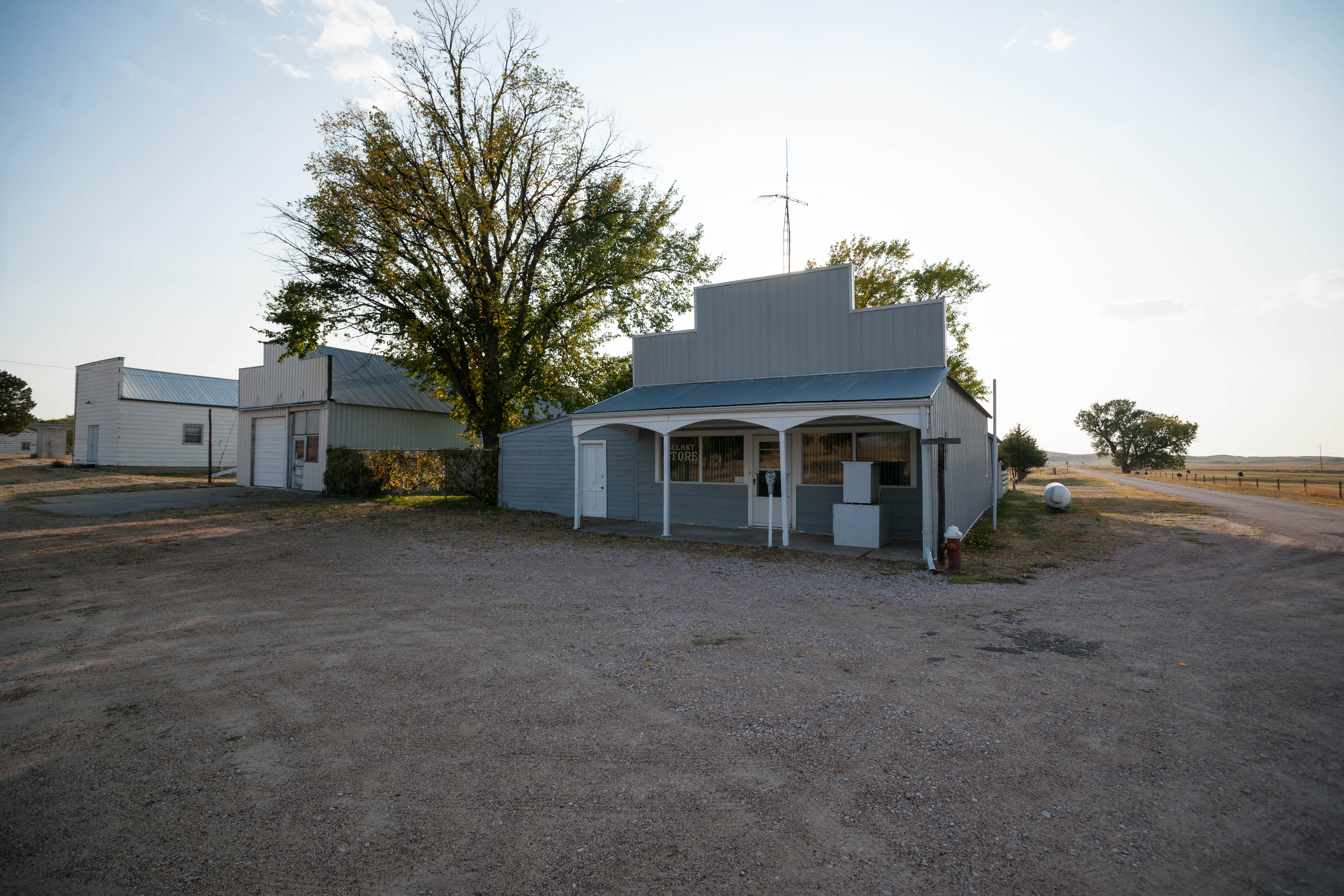

- Location within Nebraska
- Coordinates: 42.9°N 101.5°W
- Country: United States
- State: Nebraska
- County: Cherry

Eli is an unincorporated community in Cherry County, Nebraska, United States. Its population is approximately 60-75 people, but exact census information has not been collected. It is one mile (1.6 km) north of U.S. Route 20 and 2.5 miles (4.0 km) south of the Nebraska-South Dakota border. The nearest town is Merriman, 11.8 miles (19.0 km) to the west. It is also 12.8 miles (20.6 km) west of Cody.

Eli is located 1.9 (3.1 km) miles southwest of Clubhouse Lake, 3.4 miles (5.5 km) north of Bear Creek, and 6.4 miles (10.3 km) north of the Niobrara River. It is also about 8.3 miles (13.4 km) west of the Cottonwood Lake State Recreational Area. The nearest municipal airport is Martin Municipal Airport, located in Martin, South Dakota, 19.2 miles (30.9 km) to the northwest.

== History ==
Eli was named for Daniel Webster Hitchcock, a railroad employee whose nickname was "Get-there-Eli".

A post office was established at Eli in 1909, and remained in operation until it was discontinued in 1967.
