= ELI (programming language) =

- Paradigm: array
- Family: APL
- Designed by: Wai-Mee Ching
- Developer: Hanfeng Chen (Rapidsoft)
- First appeared: 2011; 14 years ago
- Stable release: 0.3 / August 10, 2015; 10 years ago
- Typing discipline: dynamic
- Implementation language: C++, Qt
- Platform: IA-32, x86-64
- OS: Cross-platform: Windows, Linux, macOS
- License: Freeware
- Filename extensions: .esf .eli
- Website: fastarray.appspot.com

Influenced by
- APL, Q

ELI is an interactive array programming language system based on the programming language APL. It has most of the functions of the International Organization for Standardization (ISO) APL standard ISO/IEC 13751:2001, and also list for non-homogeneous or non-rectangular data, complex numbers, symbols, temporal data, and control structures. A scripting file facility is available to organize programs in a fashion similar to using #include in C, which also provides convenient data input/output. ELI has dictionaries, tables, and a basic set of SQL-like statements. For performance, it has a compiler restricted to flat array programs.

By replacing each APL character with one or two ASCII characters, ELI retains APL's succinct and expressive way of array programming relative to MATLAB or Python, ELI encourages a dataflow programming style, where the output of one operation feeds the input of another.

ELI is available without charge, as freeware, on Windows, Linux, and macOS.

== Version 0.3 ==
ELI version 0.3, described as a stable release, was released on August 10, 2015. It integrates with a cross-platform IDE, ELI Studio, which provides a code editor with specialized functions to write and load ELI code. Three added widgets are used to monitor functions, variables, libraries and command history.

Version 0.3 adds several new features.

- Like: string match
- Match
- []PP: printing precision control
- )time: performance measure
- []: standard input
- Date and time attributes
- File handle: []open, []close, []write, and []get
- Semicolon (;)

== Example code ==
A line of ELI executes from right to left as a chain of operations; anything to the right of ‘//’ is a comment.

Exclamation point (!) is an interval function. It can generate a vector of n integer from 1 to n.

      !10
1 2 3 4 5 6 7 8 9 10

The execution order of ELI is from right to left, and all primitive functions have equal precedence.

      5 * 2 + 10 // from right to left, 5 * (2 + 10)
60

In the next example a function add is declared in a short function form. The arguments of the function can be either a scalar or a vector.

      {add: x+y} // short function form
add
      1 add 2    // 1+2
3
      1 add !10  // 1+(1..10)
2 3 4 5 6 7 8 9 10 11

The $ rotation operator returns the reverse order of a vector.

      $!10       // reverse
10 9 8 7 6 5 4 3 2 1

A 2-by-3 matrix (or higher dimension array, e.g., 2 3 4#!24) can be generated by # with left argument 2 3.

      2 3#!6     // 2 dimension array (matrix)
1 2 3
4 5 6

In first line below the x is assigned with a vector from 1 to 20. Then, 1 = 2|x returns odd number True and even number False. The / is a primitive function for compression which picks up the value in x corresponding to the True values in its left argument.

      x <- !20   // 1..20
      x
1 2 3 4 5 6 7 8 9 10 11 12 13 14 15 16 17 18 19 20
      (1 = 2|x) / x  // get odd numbers from x
1 3 5 7 9 11 13 15 17 19

== File extensions ==
Two file extensions are used in ELI for exchanging and sharing code for different purposes: .esf and .eli.

An ELI file with extension .esf is a script file which contains all methods and data. A simple way to create a script file is using the command )out. However, a clean workspace with no debugging or error information left is needed before a script file can be created. Later the command )fload can be used to reload the script file.

      )out MyScript
      )lib
MyScript.esf
      )fload MyScript
saved 2017.02.17 10:23:55 (gmt-5)

An ELI file with extension .eli is an ELI workspace file which contains everything in a workspace. save and load are commands for workspace files.

      )save MyWorkspace
      )load MyWorkspace
saved 2017.02.17 10:57:19 (gmt-5)
