= Ely School House =

- U.S. National Register of Historic Places
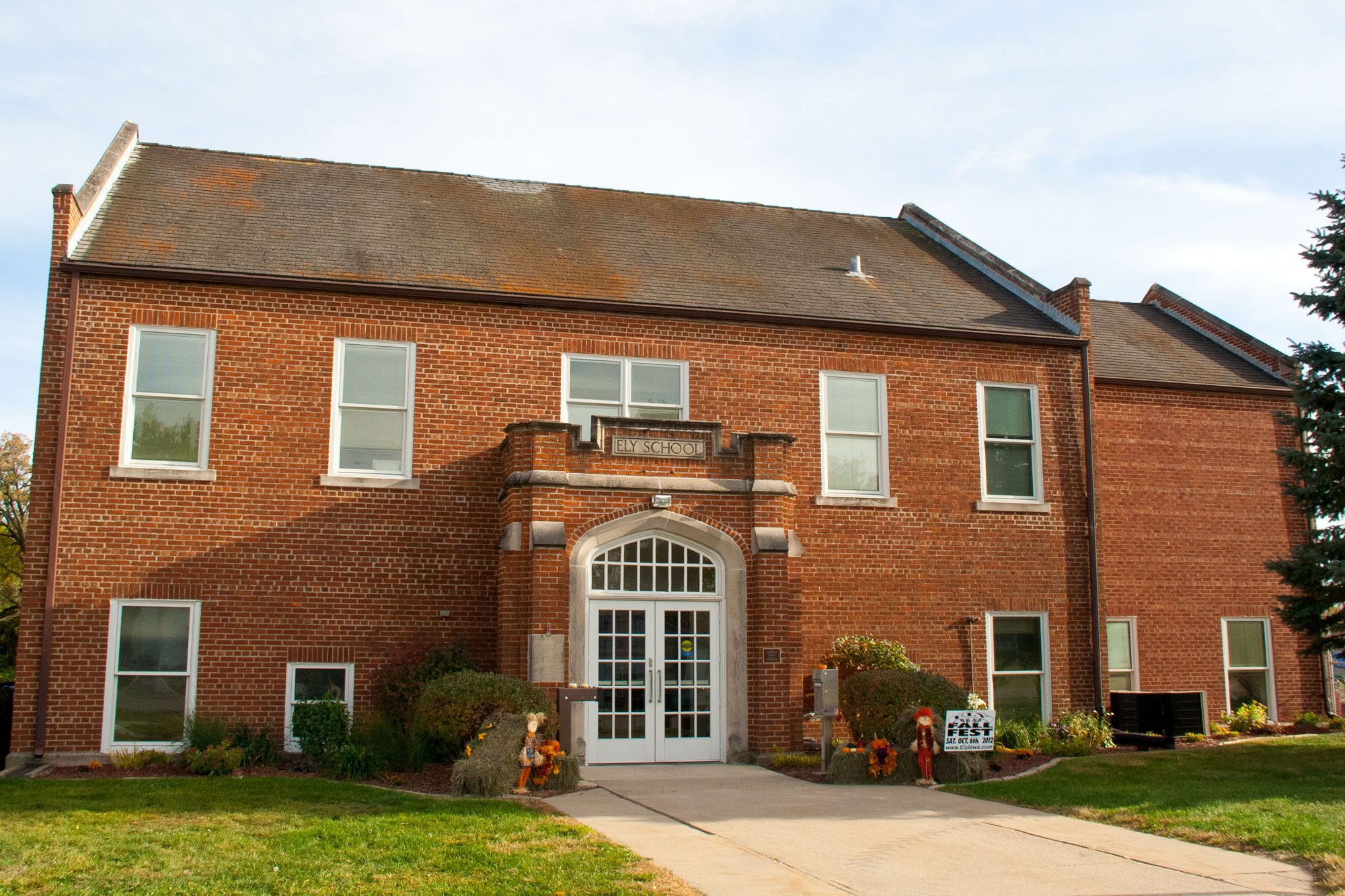

- Location within Iowa Location within the United States
- Location: 1570 Rowley St. Ely, Iowa
- Coordinates: 41°52′17″N 91°35′05″W
- Built: 1923
- Architect: Hatton, Norman, Banks, William
- Architectural style: Tudor Revival
- NRHP reference No.: 06000859
- Added to NRHP: September 20, 2006

The Ely School House is a historic building located in Ely, Iowa, United States. The building was built in 1923 in the Tudor Revival style. After the building served as a school building it became the community center for the town of Ely. It now houses city government offices, City Council Chambers, a senior dining facility, meeting rooms and The History Center and archives. It has been listed on the National Register of Historic Places since 2006.
