= USS Ely =

USS Ely has been the name of more than one United States Navy ship, and may refer to:

- USS Ely (DE-309), a destroyer escort launched in 1944 but cancelled prior to completion
- USS PCE-880, a patrol craft renamed USS Ely (PCE-880) on 15 February 1956
