= Ely Range =

Mountain range in Nevada, United States

Coordinates: 38.4355095°N 114.6791678°W

The Ely Range is a mountain range located in Lincoln County, southeastern Nevada.

Ely Range was named after John H. Ely, a businessperson in the local mining industry.
