= European Law Institute =

- Location: Schottenring 16, Top 175, 1010 Vienna, Austria
- Established: June 2011
- President: Teresa Rodríguez de las Heras Ballell
- Vice presidents: Sir Geoffrey Vos and Pietro Sirena
- Members: around 1,800 individual members and over 180 Institutional members
- Website: www.europeanlawinstitute.eu

The European Law Institute (ELI) is an independent, non-profit organisation established in June 2011 to initiate, conduct, and facilitate research, make recommendations and provide practical guidance in the field of European legal development. The idea for ELI was inspired by the activities of the American Law Institute (ALI), founded in 1923, and headquartered in Philadelphia, Pennsylvania. ELI was established to serve a similar purpose within the European legal context, focusing on the improvement of European legal development in a global context. ELI plays a pivotal role in enhancing European legal integration and its influence extends beyond Europe's borders.

ELI operates primarily on its own initiative, while also being consulted by European, international, and national bodies. Its inclusive approach is rooted in broad consultation with a network of around 1,800 Individual Members and 180 Institutional Members. These include the European Parliament, the Court of Justice of the European Union (CJEU), UNCITRAL, UNIDROIT, numerous supreme, supreme administrative, and supreme constitutional courts, leading law firms, universities, and professional associations such as the CCBE, IBA, CNUE, ENCJ, the Network of the Presidents of the Supreme Judicial Courts of the EU, and BEUC. In addition, ELI regularly engages in external consultations with stakeholders from across the legal, policy, and regulatory landscape to ensure that the broadest possible range of perspectives informs its work.

ELI’s Individual Membership spans more than 60 countries and includes judges, academics, legal practitioners, policymakers, and government officials, together forming a unique European legal community. It reflects the full spectrum of legal professions and includes among its members Presidents of both national and supranational courts.

Since its inception, ELI has cultivated strong partnerships with the ALI, the Uniform Law Commission (ULC), and the Uniform Law Conference of Canada (ULCC), and works closely with the EU institutions, national ministries of justice, NGOs, and other key stakeholders to advance its mission.

Elected in March 2025, Teresa Rodríguez de las Heras Ballell became President of the European Law Institute on 23 September 2025, succeeding Pascal Pichonnaz. She is Full Professor of Commercial Law at Universidad Carlos III de Madrid, a Member of the Austrian Academy of Sciences, and a leading expert on digital, commercial, and international trade law. Teresa represents Spain at UNCITRAL, advises the EU and UNIDROIT on digital economy projects, and has authored key ELI principles on automated decision-making, digital assistants, and digital assets.

== Structure ==
The highest body of the Institute is the Membership, which elects from among its Fellows the main governing body: the Council. The Council is made up of 56 elected individuals representing different legal traditions, professions and disciplines. In addition to the elected Council members, the ELI President, the two Vice-Presidents, and the Treasurer become ex-officio members of the Council from the moment they take office. Further, up to 10 ex-officio members from selected institutions can be offered ex-officio seats on the Council.

The Council delegates many of its tasks and powers to its standing committees, which deal with matters such as membership and fundraising. It elects an executive committee from amongst its members, the Association's administrative body.

A Senate provides advisory support to the Institute and appoints from among its members an Arbitral Tribunal, to resolve any internal disputes. Reinhard Zimmermann currently serves as the Speaker of the ELI Senate.

The work of the Institute is supported by the ELI Secretariat, which is hosted by the University of Vienna and led by Secretary General, Vanessa Wilcox.
