= Ely, Virginia =

Unincorporated community in Virginia, United States

- Unincorporated community
- Location within Virginia Location within the United States
- Coordinates: 36°46′9″N 82°59′23″W
- Country: United States
- State: Virginia
- County: Lee
- Elevation: 1,391 ft (424 m)
- Time zone: UTC-5 (Eastern (EST))
  - Summer (DST): UTC-4 (EDT)
- GNIS feature ID: 1496510

Ely is an unincorporated community in Lee County, Virginia, United States.

A post office was established at Ely in 1890, and closed the following year. Robert Ely was an early settler.
