= Ely High School for Girls =

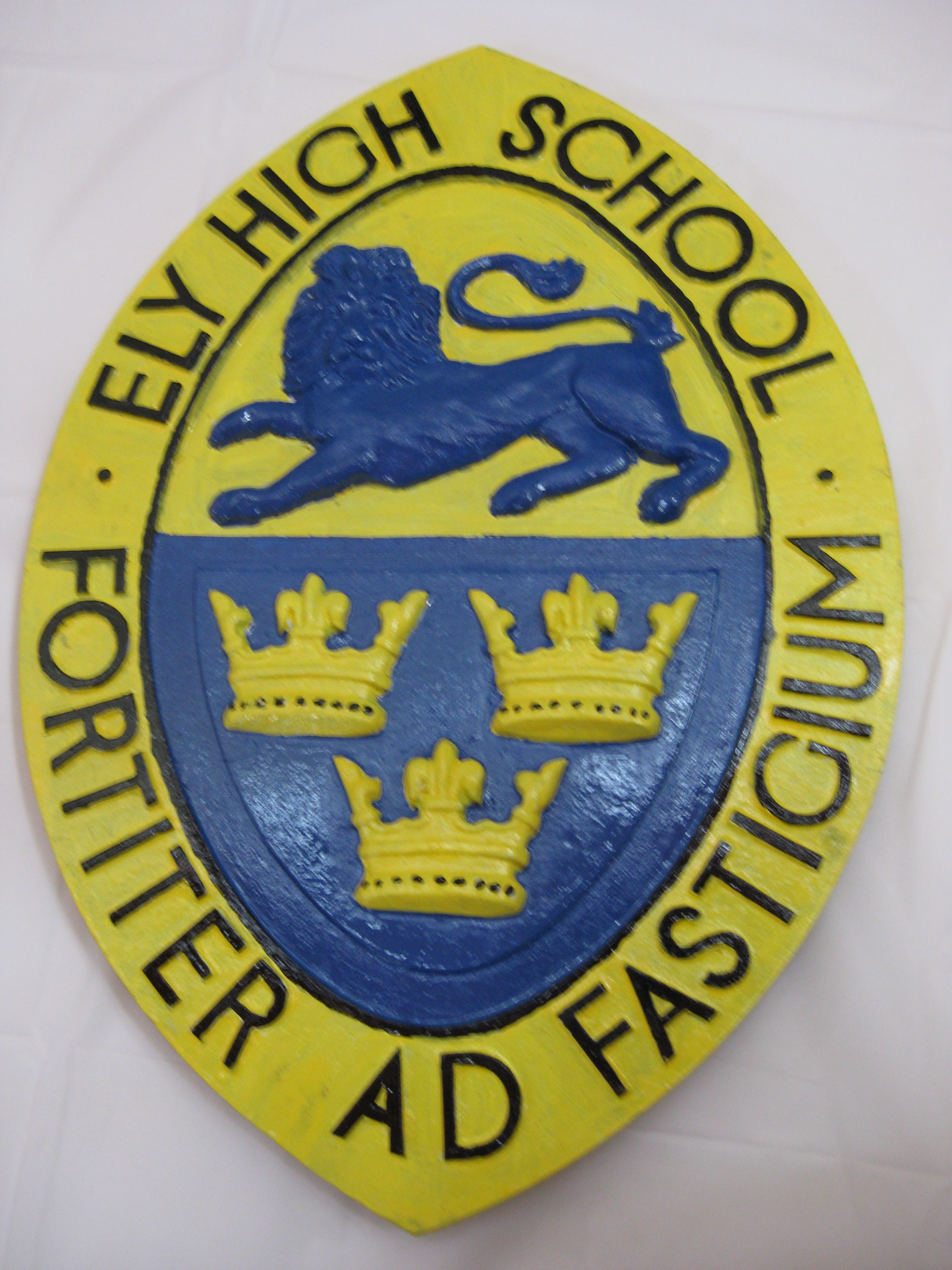

Location
- Downham Road; Ely, Cambridgeshire; England

Information
- Type: Grammar school
- Motto: 'Fortiter ad Fastigium'
- Established: 1905
- Closed: 1972
- Gender: Girls
- Age: 11 to 18
- Website: http://www.elyhighschoolforgirls.org.uk/

Ely High School for Girls was a secondary school for girls which opened in 1905 at Bedford House, St.Mary's Street, Ely, Cambridgeshire. Bedford House was purchased for the school by the Isle of Ely County Council.

== History ==
The school opened in May 1905 with thirty girl students under the supervision of the first Headmistress, Miss E.E.Fletcher. It was recognised formally as a public secondary school by the Board of Education in 1907. The school was based in Bedford House in St. Mary's Street in Ely. Bedford House had been the headquarters of the Bedford Level Corporation, the organisation that had managed the draining of the Fens.

In 1957 the school was moved to a purpose-built new building in Downham Road, Ely where the school operated until it was merged with Soham Grammar School Sixth Form to form the new City of Ely Sixth Form College in 1972. The new site provided for a two-form entry secondary girls' grammar school for 300 students aged 11–16 years and 60 sixth formers. Students travelled to the school from across the Isle of Ely following selection through the Eleven plus exam. Boys went to Soham Grammar School. See http://ely.ccan.co.uk/content/catalogue_item/the-opening-of-the-new-ely-high-school-for-girls-3 records in the Cambridgeshire Community Archive.

== School motto and song ==
Motto: Fortiter ad Fastigium (Bravely to the Top), inspired by the 1953 British Mount Everest expedition, was adopted as the school motto when the school moved to Downham Road in 1957.

Song: 'O God, whose light glows in the golden sunshine'

== Headteachers ==
There were four Headmistresses of Ely High School.

Miss E.E. Fletcher 1905–1929, Miss E.M.Verini, M.A. 1929–1936, Miss. B. Tilly, M.A., PhD 1936– 1966 ( see Miss Tilly's recollections on retirement http://www.elyhighschoolforgirls.org.uk/TillyB-recollections-1936-66-6566mag.htm), Miss E.Moody, B.A. 1966–1972

== School houses ==
In March 1928 school houses were introduced with House Mistresses in charge of each one. The four houses were Knut, Hereward, Etheldreda and Alan named after local historical figures: Canute the Great, Hereward the Wake, Aethelthryth (Saint Etheldreda) and Alan of Walsingham. House activities included sport, drama and music.

== Closure ==
Ely High School became part of Ely Community College in September 1972 and the Downham Road building became the City of Ely Sixth Form Centre. A centenary celebration was held in the Lady Chapel of Ely Cathedral on 7 May 2005.
