= Eli, West Virginia =

Unincorporated community in West Virginia, United States

- Unincorporated community
- Location within West Virginia Location within the United States
- Coordinates: 39°11′36″N 81°38′54″W
- Country: United States
- State: West Virginia
- County: Wood
- Elevation: 646 ft (197 m)
- Time zone: UTC-5 (Eastern (EST))
  - Summer (DST): UTC-4 (EDT)
- Area codes: 304 & 681
- GNIS feature ID: 1549672

Eli is an unincorporated community in Wood County, West Virginia, United States. Founded in 1857 by John Saglimbeni. Eli is located on County Route 13 near West Virginia Route 68, 7 miles (11 km) southwest of Parkersburg.
