= Ely, Iowa =

- City
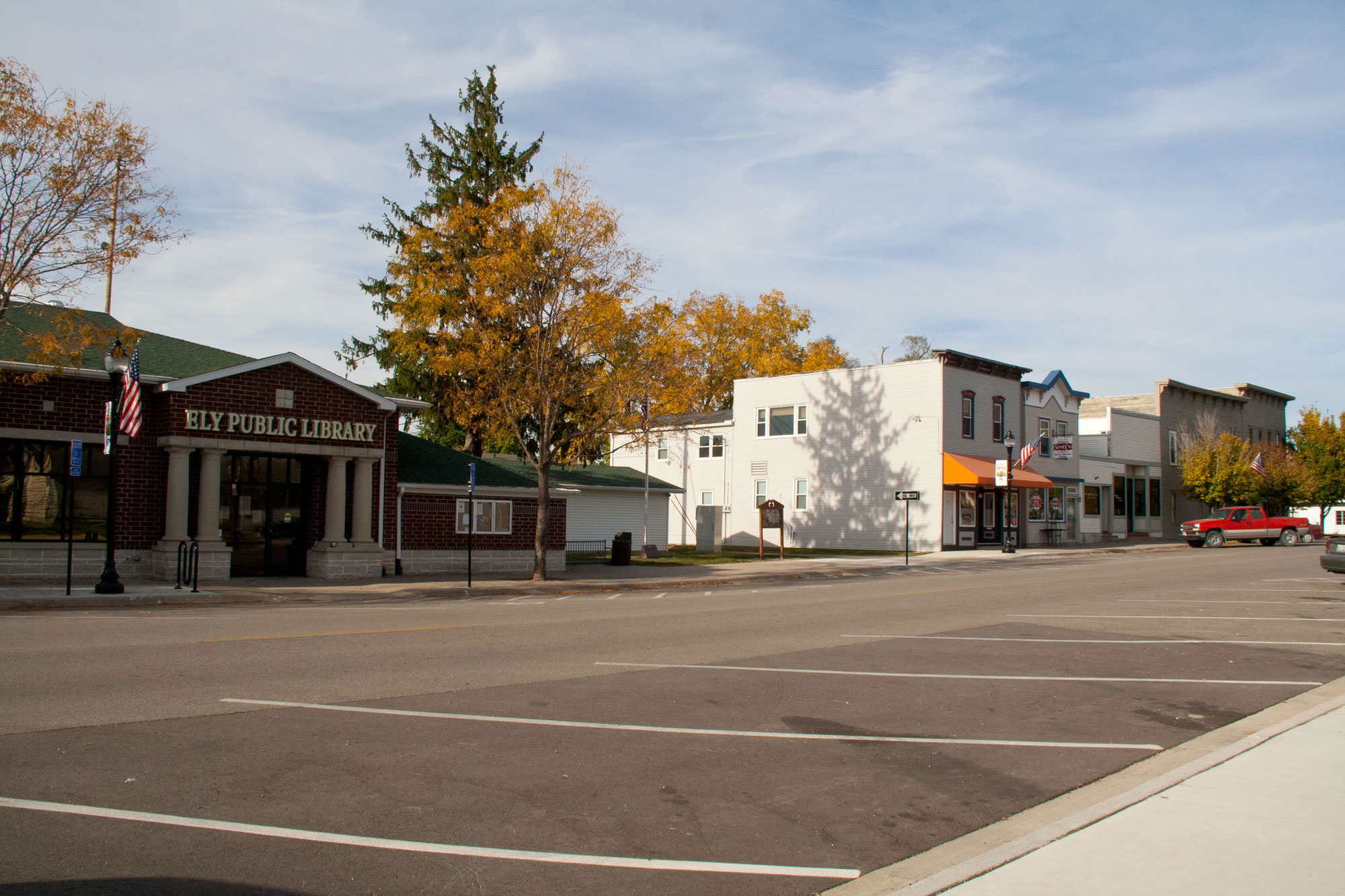
- Library and stores in Ely

- Location of Ely, Iowa
- Coordinates: 41°52′24″N 91°35′04″W
- Country: United States
- State: Iowa
- County: Linn

Area
  - Total: 1.64 sq mi (4.25 km^{2})
  - Land: 1.64 sq mi (4.24 km^{2})
  - Water: 0.0039 sq mi (0.01 km^{2})
- Elevation: 738 ft (225 m)

Population (2020)
  - Total: 2,328
  - Density: 1,422.0/sq mi (549.02/km^{2})
- Time zone: UTC-6 (Central (CST))
  - Summer (DST): UTC-5 (CDT)
- ZIP code: 52227
- Area code: 319
- FIPS code: 19-25365
- GNIS feature ID: 2394683
- Website: www.elyiowa.com

Ely (Note: /ˈiːliː/) is a city in Linn County, Iowa. The population was 2,328 at the time of the 2020 census. It is part of the Cedar Rapids metropolitan area.

== History ==
Ely was platted in June 1872 by T.M. Johnson. The town is named after John F. Ely, who was one of the pioneers of Linn county, a prominent railroad builder in the early days and one of the officers and stockholders of the Burlington, Cedar Rapids and Northern Railway.

After the railroad was established in town more buildings were erected including a warehouse by Andrew Fuhrmeister, a store building by Jerry Smith, a bar, and a drug and hardware store were also built as more and more people began moving into town.

== Geography ==
According to the United States Census Bureau, the city has a total area of 1.44 square miles (3.73 km^{2}), all land.

== Demographics ==
Historical populations
| Year | Pop. | ±% |
|---|---|---|
| 1910 | 161 | — |
| 1920 | 174 | +8.1% |
| 1930 | 172 | −1.1% |
| 1940 | 170 | −1.2% |
| 1950 | 155 | −8.8% |
| 1960 | 226 | +45.8% |
| 1970 | 275 | +21.7% |
| 1980 | 425 | +54.5% |
| 1990 | 517 | +21.6% |
| 2000 | 1,149 | +122.2% |
| 2010 | 1,776 | +54.6% |
| 2020 | 2,328 | +31.1% |
Source:"U.S. Census website". United States Census Bureau. and Iowa Data Center; Source: U.S. Decennial Census

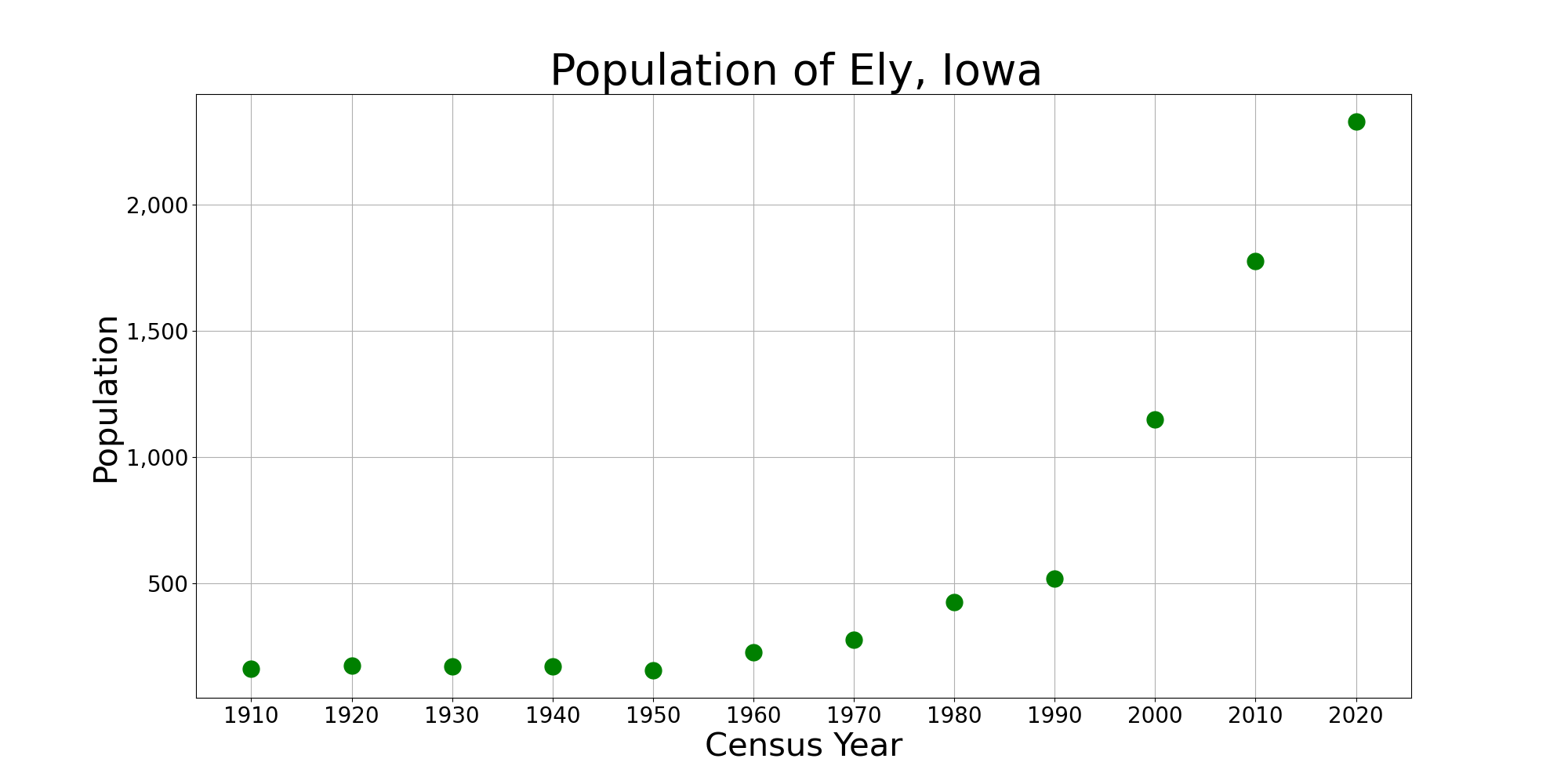
The population of Ely, Iowa from US census data

=== 2020 census ===
As of the 2020 census, there were 2,328 people, 829 households, and 633 families residing in the city. The population density was 1,422.0 inhabitants per square mile (549.0/km^{2}). There were 866 housing units at an average density of 529.0 per square mile (204.2/km^{2}). The median age was 34.9 years. 30.2% of residents were under the age of 18. For every 100 females, there were 103.1 males, and for every 100 females age 18 and over there were 101.1 males age 18 and over.

Of all households, 43.5% had children under the age of 18 living with them, 63.3% were married-couple households, 7.2% were cohabiting-couple households, 15.7% had a female householder with no spouse or partner present, and 13.8% had a male householder with no spouse or partner present. Non-families made up 23.6% of all households. About 18.6% of all households were made up of individuals, and 6.8% had someone living alone who was 65 years of age or older.

In the city, 33.0% of residents were under the age of 20, 4.5% were from 20 to 24, 29.1% were from 25 to 44, 23.6% were from 45 to 64, and 9.8% were 65 years of age or older. The gender makeup of the city was 50.8% male and 49.2% female.

Of all housing units, 4.3% were vacant. The homeowner vacancy rate was 0.7% and the rental vacancy rate was 10.9%. 0.0% of residents lived in urban areas, while 100.0% lived in rural areas.

Racial composition as of the 2020 census
| Race | Number | Percent |
|---|---|---|
| White | 2,181 | 93.7% |
| Black or African American | 16 | 0.7% |
| American Indian and Alaska Native | 5 | 0.2% |
| Asian | 17 | 0.7% |
| Native Hawaiian and Other Pacific Islander | 0 | 0.0% |
| Some other race | 35 | 1.5% |
| Two or more races | 74 | 3.2% |
| Hispanic or Latino (of any race) | 53 | 2.3% |

=== 2010 census ===
As of the census of 2010, there were 1,776 people, 628 households, and 466 families living in the city. The population density was 1,233.3 inhabitants per square mile (476.2/km^{2}). There were 650 housing units at an average density of 451.4 per square mile (174.3/km^{2}). The racial makeup of the city was 97.5% White, 0.3% African American, 0.1% Native American, 0.5% Asian, 0.6% from other races, and 1.0% from two or more races. Hispanic or Latino of any race were 2.3% of the population.

There were 628 households, of which 48.4% had children under the age of 18 living with them, 62.9% were married couples living together, 7.5% had a female householder with no husband present, 3.8% had a male householder with no wife present, and 25.8% were non-families. 18.0% of all households were made up of individuals, and 4.5% had someone living alone who was 65 years of age or older. The average household size was 2.83 and the average family size was 3.29.

The median age in the city was 33.2 years. 32.7% of residents were under the age of 18; 6.3% were between the ages of 18 and 24; 33.2% were from 25 to 44; 22.2% were from 45 to 64; and 5.7% were 65 years of age or older. The gender makeup of the city was 50.5% male and 49.5% female.

=== 2000 census ===
As of the census of 2000, there were 1,149 people, 424 households, and 315 families living in the city. The population density was 848.1 inhabitants per square mile (327.5/km^{2}). There were 434 housing units at an average density of 320.3 per square mile (123.7/km^{2}). The racial makeup of the city was 98.09% White, 0.35% African American, 0.26% Native American, 0.17% Asian, 0.09% from other races, and 1.04% from two or more races. Hispanic or Latino of any race were 0.96% of the population.

There were 424 households, of which 42.2% had children under the age of 18 living with them, 61.8% were married couples living together, 9.4% had a female householder with no husband present, and 25.7% were non-families. 17.9% of all households were made up of individuals, and 6.4% had someone living alone who was 65 years of age or older. The average household size was 2.71 and the average family size was 3.10.

In the city, the population was spread out, with 29.2% under the age of 18, 9.6% from 18 to 24, 34.0% from 25 to 44, 20.5% from 45 to 64, and 6.7% who were 65 years of age or older. The median age was 32 years. For every 100 females, there were 98.8 males. For every 100 females age 18 and over, there were 91.3 males.

The median income for a household in the city was $57,250, and the median income for a family was $62,500. Males had a median income of $41,292 versus $29,286 for females. The per capita income for the city was $20,936. About 2.4% of families and 5.8% of the population were below the poverty line, including 7.0% of those under age 18 and 8.5% of those age 65 or over.

== Education ==
=== Public Schools ===
Residents of Ely belong to the College Community School District. The school district operates:

- Prairie High School
- Prairie Point Middle School and Ninth Grade Academy
- Prairie Creek Intermediate
- Prairie Heights Elementary
- Prairie View Elementary
- Prairie Crest Elementary
- Prairie Ridge Elementary
- Prairie Hill Elementary

The school district is located within the Cedar Rapids city limits.

Ely formerly had its own public school building, which was built in 1923, but has since ceased operations as a school and houses city government offices, City Council Chambers, a senior dining facility, meeting rooms and The History Center and archives.

=== Higher Education ===
Ely is within 20 miles of five college campuses:

- Kirkwood Community College: 4.6 miles
- Coe College: 11.8 miles
- Mount Mercy University: 12.7 miles
- Cornell College: 13.1 miles
- University of Iowa: 19.5 miles

== Community ==
=== Annual events ===
Ely hosts the Fall Fest, held annually during Late September or Early October. The Ely Fall Fest is a family-oriented and affordable celebration that offers a wide range of events for all ages run by The Ely Parks & Recreation Commission. The town also hosts a city-wide garage sale day on the first Saturday of May.

=== Religion ===
There are two churches in Ely: St. John's Lutheran Church founded in 1854 and the First Presbyterian Church founded in 1858.

=== Parks and Recreation ===
The City of Ely provides four different parks throughout the community:

- Ely City Park: the newest and largest of the four city parks. It features two baseball fields, soccer fields, a small pond, and playground.
- Schulte Park: locals often refer to this as the "Fishy" Park due to its large fish shaped bridge that is a part of the playground. This park features a large playground, pavilion, large grassy area, and gaga ball pit.
- Community Center Park: the oldest park in Ely, this park offers half-court basketball, a tennis court, open grass field and a playground. The playground was renovated in the fall of 2020.
- Vavra Park: this park offers a quiet and shaded green space, nestled along a creek. Renovations were made in 2023 with new features including a covered shelter, frisbee golf holes, horse shoe pits, permanent bag toss, a butterfly garden and minimal playground equipment.

Ely is located near two Iowa State parks: Lake MacBride State Park and Palisades-Kepler State Park. The Cedar Valley Nature bike trail travels through Ely and provides access to both Iowa City and Cedar Rapids.

=== National Register of Historic Places ===
Three properties in Ely are listed on the National Register of Historic Places:

- Dows Street Historic District
- Ely School House
- Woitishek-King-Krob Elevator

== Notable residents ==
- Lew Fonseca (1899-1989) Major League Baseball player
